= Park Glienicke =

- Park Klein-Glienicke or Glienicker Park
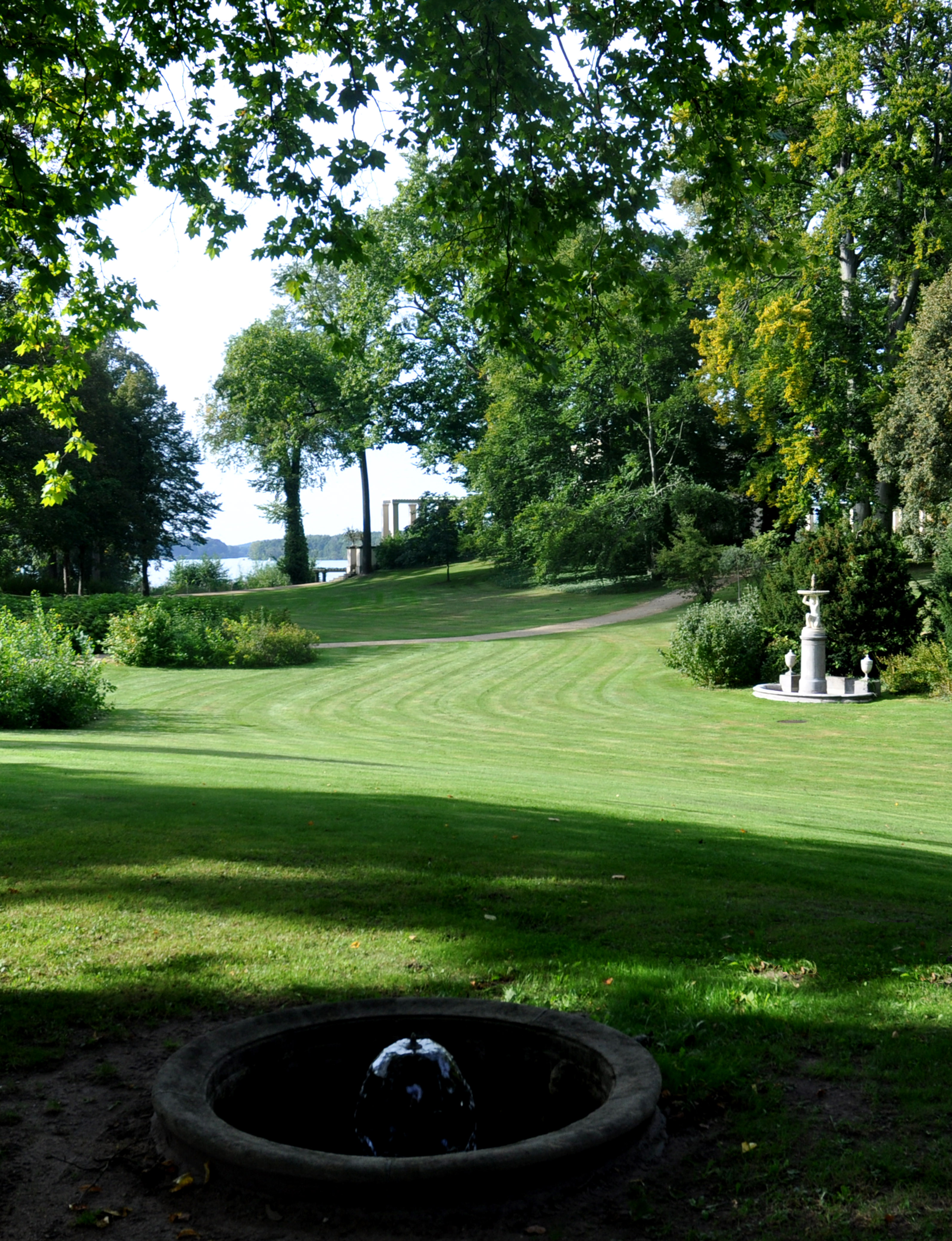
- Pleasure ground, view from Lenné Hill towards Jungfernsee(River Havel)

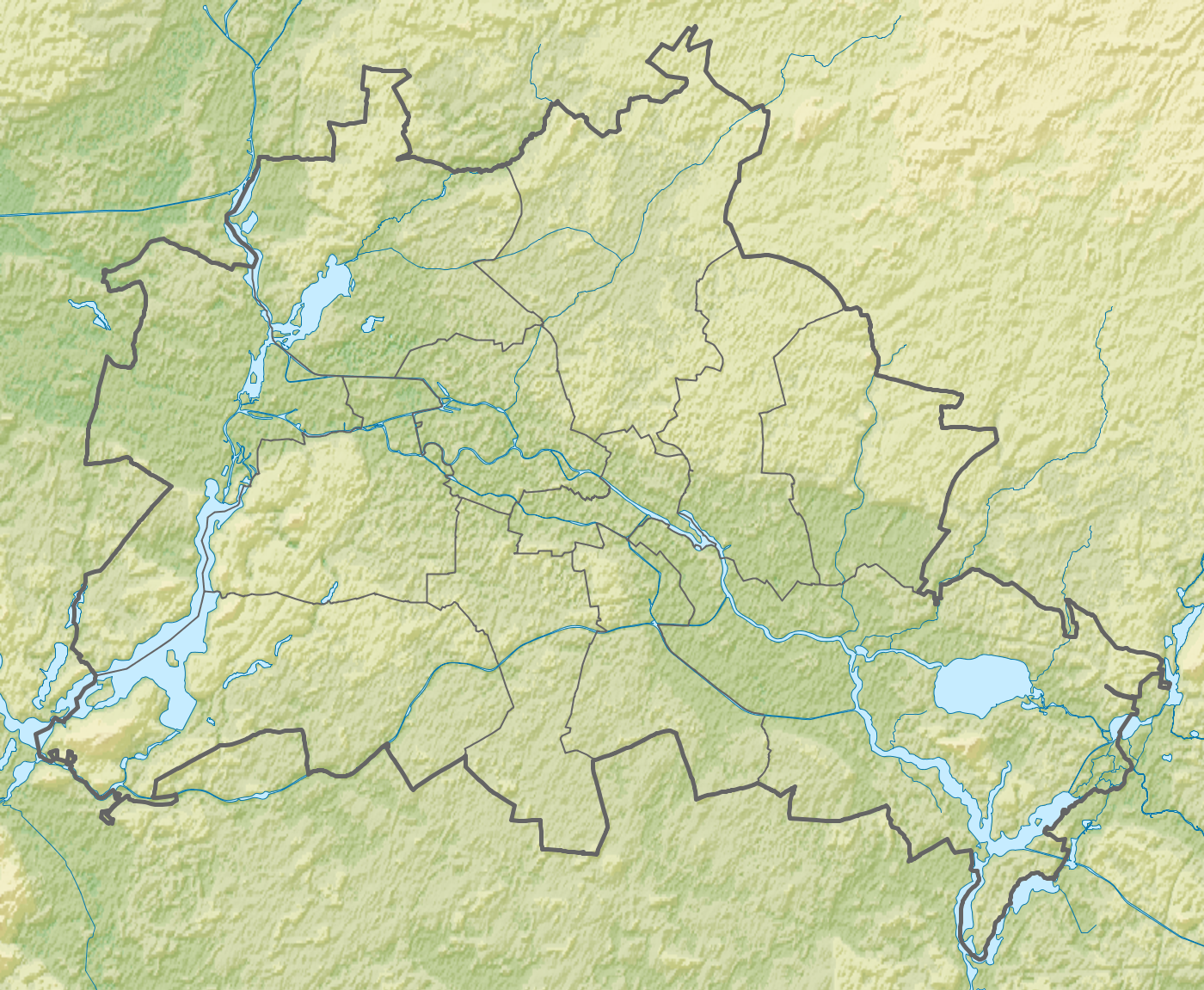
- Location within Germany Location within Berlin
- Type: English landscape garden
- Location: Wannsee, Berlin
- Coordinates: 52°25′0″N 13°6′0″E
- Area: 116 ha (290 acres)
- Created: 1816-1870
- Status: Open year-round

UNESCO World Heritage Site
- Part of: Palaces and Parks of Potsdam and Berlin
- Criteria: Cultural: (i)(ii)(iv)
- Reference: 532ter
- Inscription: 1990 (14th Session)
- Extensions: 1992, 1999

Park Glienicke (German: Park Klein-Glienicke or Glienicker Park) is an English landscape garden in the southwestern outskirts of Berlin, Germany. It is located in the locality of Wannsee in the Steglitz-Zehlendorf borough. Close to Glienicke Bridge (known as Bridge of Spies) the park is open to the general public. The park is part of the UNESCO World Heritage Site Palaces and Parks of Potsdam and Berlin (Potsdam cultural ensemble). Within the ensemble it is one of the five main parks, the others being Sanssouci Park, New Garden (Neuer Garten), Babelsberg Park and Peacock Island (Pfaueninsel). Regarding diversity in gardening styles within the Potsdam park ensemble Park Glienicke is only superseded by Sanssouci Park. Furthermore, it is a park especially characterized by one personality due to the intense involvement of Prince Charles of Prussia. The park covers approximately 116 hectares (290 acres)

== History ==
In 1682 Frederick William of Brandenburg, the Great Elector, commissioned the first hunting lodge Jagdschloss Glienicke next to the uninhabited village Klein-Glienicke which suffered badly in the Thirty Years' War. The lodge had a garden with four carp ponds. South of the lodge was an enclosed wildlife park; north a tree garden and two vineyards. Already since 1660 the first wooden Glienicke Bridge linked the area to Potsdam. In 1715 under Frederick William, the Soldier King, the lodge became a military hospital for soldiers to be quarantined. In 1747 the hospital head Dr. Mirow bought the tree garden and the new vineyard which were neglected since the Soldier King's death and established there an estate where besides farming kilns for bricks and lime were operated. In 1758 the lodge itself was turned into a wallpaper factory which became an orphanage in 1827. From 1789 on the Berlin-Potsdam chaussee (de) was built distinctly separating former lodge and new estate. The Mirow estate had different owners until the Prussian lieutenant general and head equerry Count Carl von Lindenau (de) bought it in 1796 and converted it into an ornamented farm./

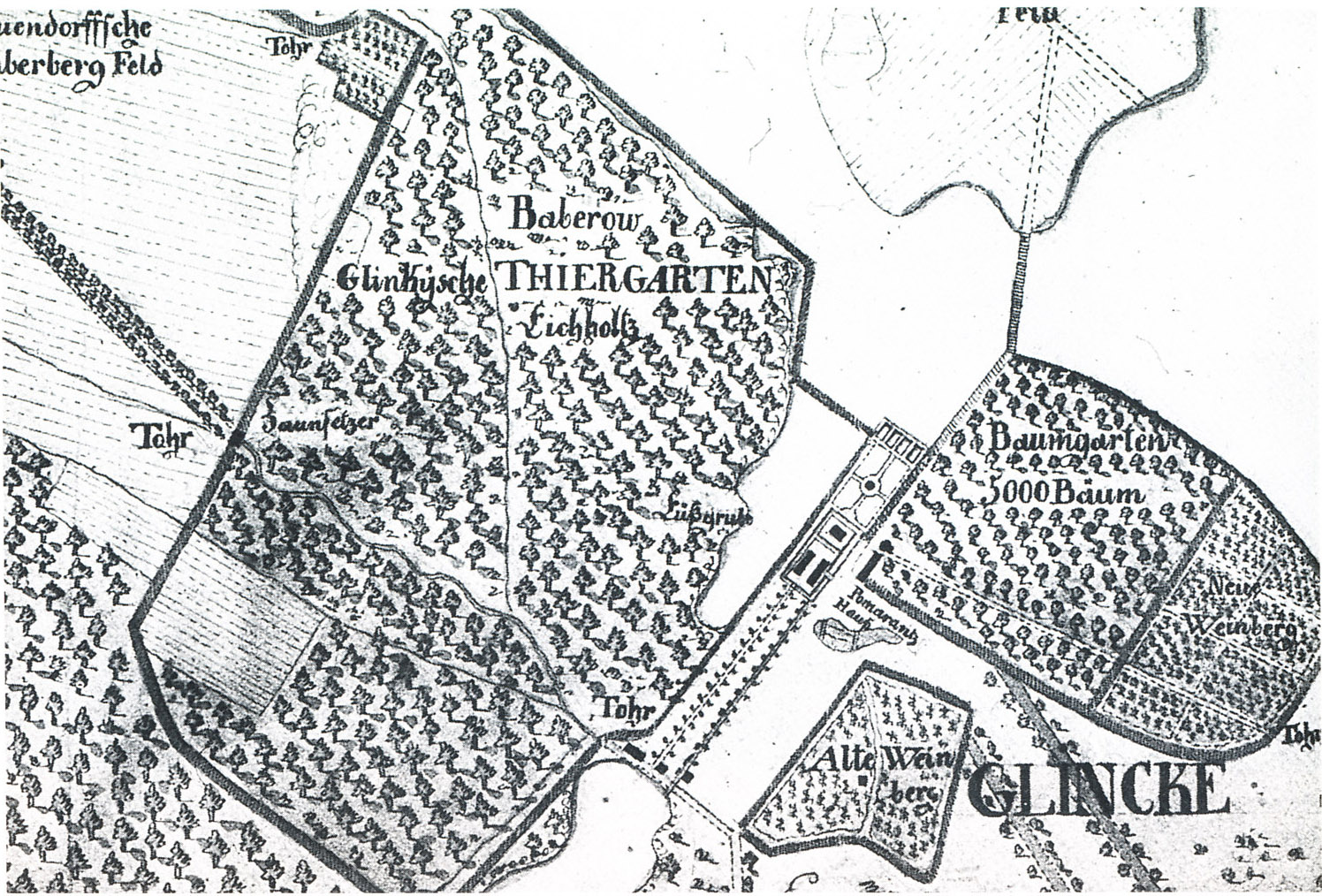
Map of the first Hunting Lodge Glienicke, North to the right (Samuel de Suchodolec, 1683)

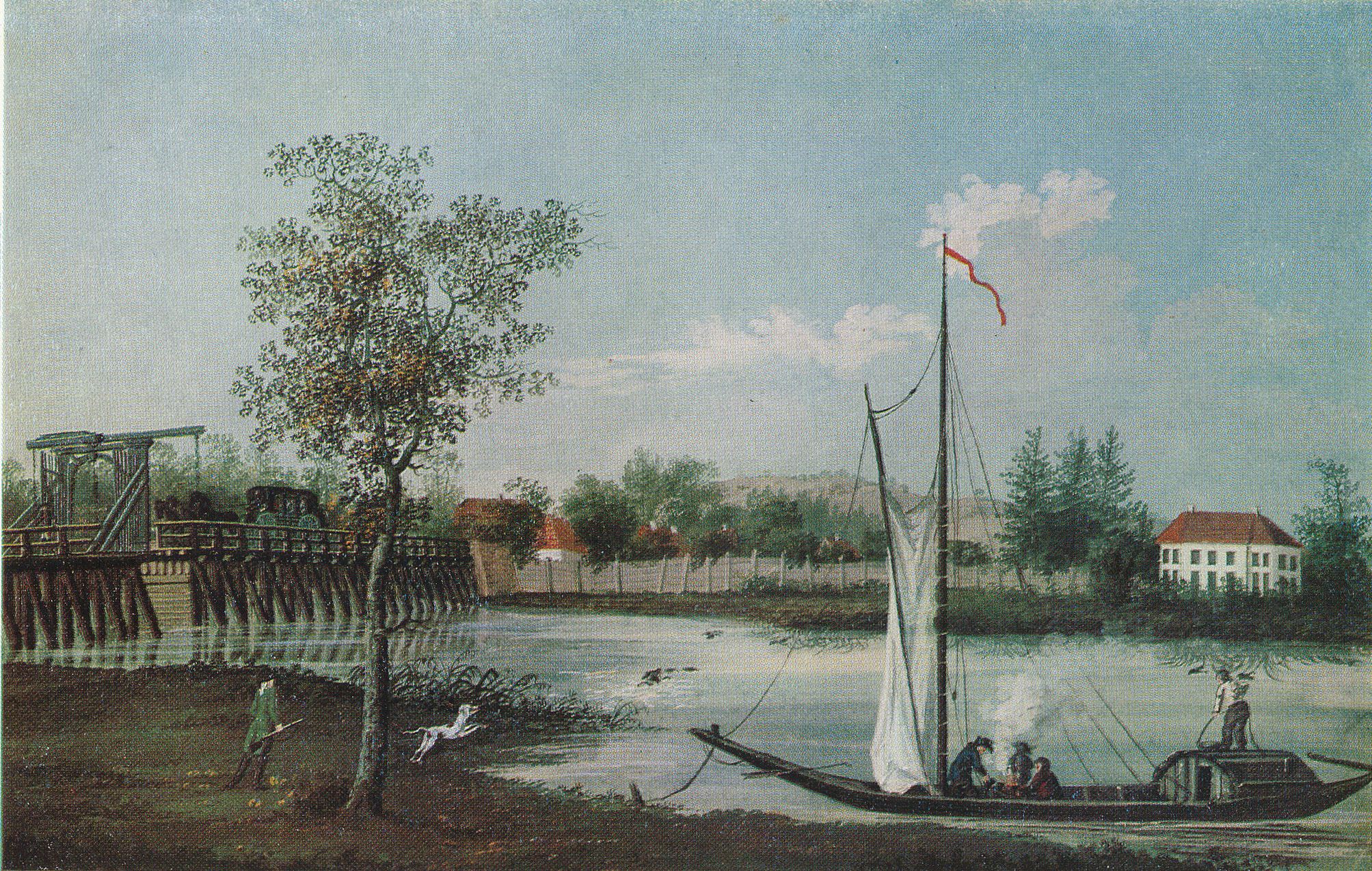
Second wooden Glienicke Bridge and first Hunting Lodge Glienicke (Johann Friedrich Nagel, 1788)

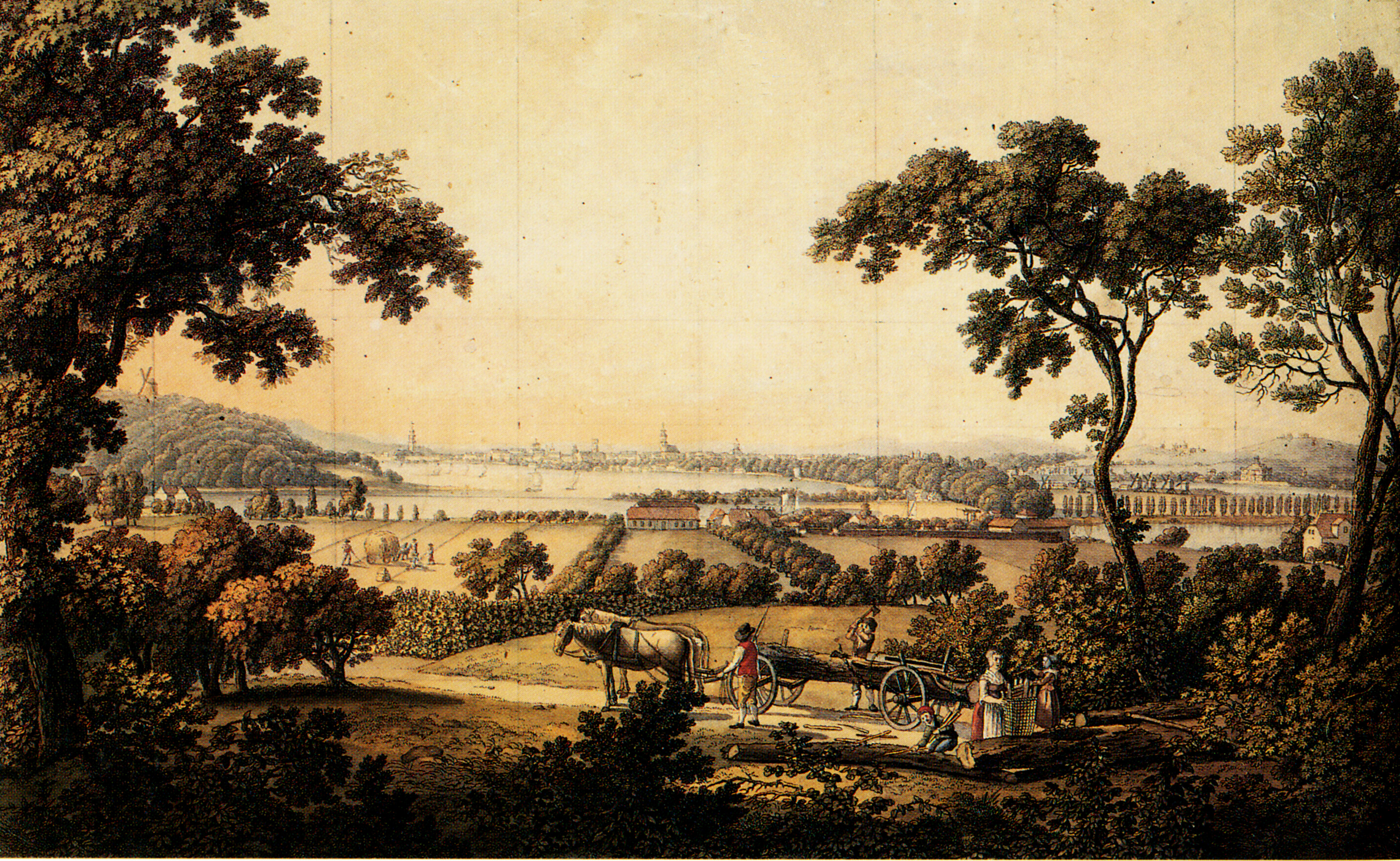
View from vineyard (later site of Roman Bench) across estate towards Potsdam (Berger following Lüdtke, 1796)

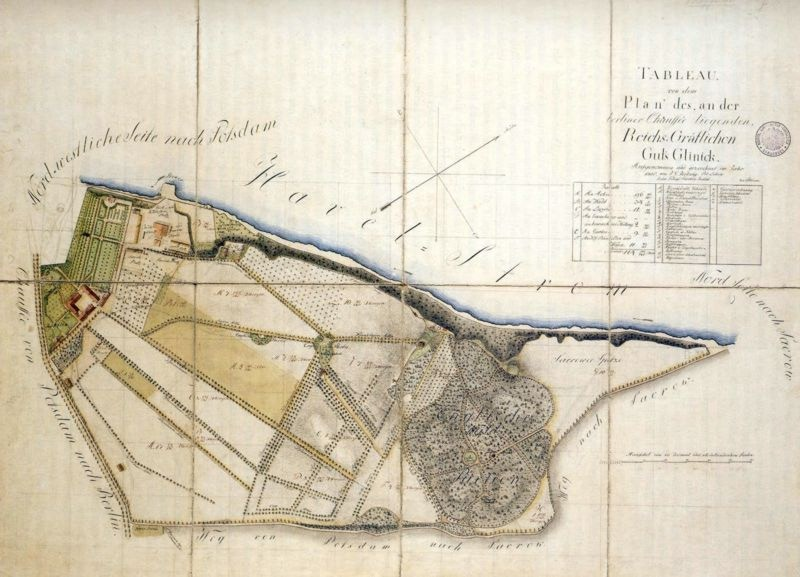
Map of Lindenau's Ornamental Farm, North to the right (J. G. Hellwig, 1805)

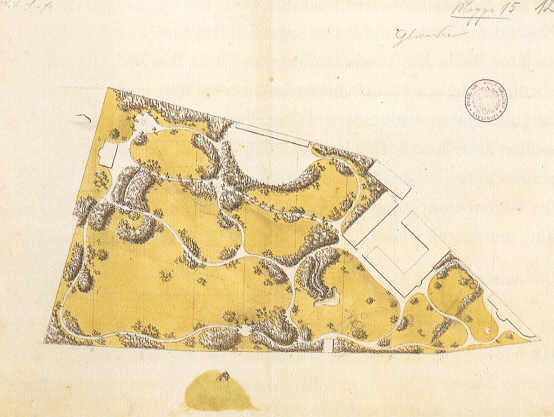
Map of Pleasure Ground Glienicke (P. J. Lenné, 1816)

After the Prussian Chancellor Karl August von Hardenberg had purchased the estate in 1814, he commissioned the Prussian gardener Peter Joseph Lenné to design a park in 1816. The first part was the pleasure ground inspired by English landscape gardening. In 1822 Germany's renowned landscape gardener Prince Hermann von Pückler-Muskau brought the English architect John Adey Repton(son of the great English landscape designer Humphry Repton) to Glienicke. After his return to England J.A. Repton designed a Hardenberg basket supposedly inspired by a wooden basket containing a bed of roses in Glienicke.

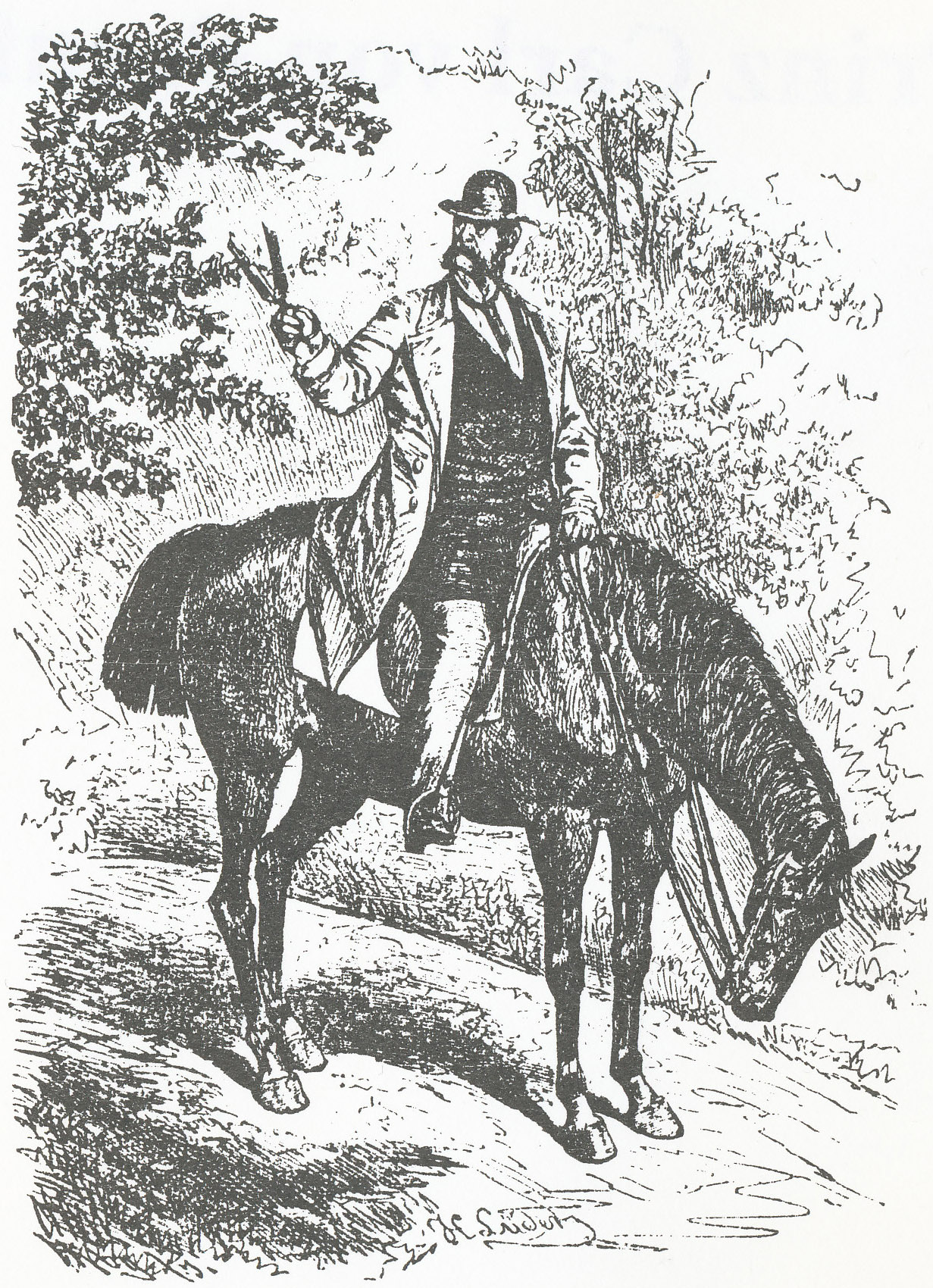
Prince Charles tending trees in Park Glienicke (H. Lüdeke, around 1880)

In November 1822 Chancellor Hardenberg died. In 1824 the estate was sold to Prince Charles of Prussia. It has remained a mystery why the unmarried third-born son of the Prussian king was the first son to get his own estate. While the mansion was converted into Glienicke Palace, designed by Karl Friedrich Schinkel, Prince Charles developed the park together with Lenné and other gardeners in the following decades to the extent which is still visible today. Being a particular anglophile he had the nickname „Sir Charles Glienicke“ within the Prussian royal family. Yet he never travelled to England as he was opposed to British politics like his anglophile sister Charlotte, the wife of Russian Emperor Nicholas I. Visiting his sister Prince Charles travelled several times to Saint Petersburg, where he was especially fascinated by Pavlovsk Park, which was designed as a classic English landscape garden. Park Glienicke was well known to the European aristocracy as the protocol for state visits to the Prussian capital required to pay also a visit to Prince Charles in Glienicke. On 14 August 1858 Queen Victoria and Prince Consort Albert visited Palace and Park Glienicke. Earlier that year their daughter Victoria had married Charles' nephew Crown Prince Frederick William of Prussia.

After the park had been officially called Prince's Charles of Prussia Park(Park des Prinzen Carl von Preußen) since 1824 it was renamed to Prince's Friedrich Leopold of Prussia Park(Park des Prinzen Friedrich Leopold von Preußen) in 1885. As Charles' son Friedrich Carl of Prussia survived him by only two years the grandson Friedrich Leopold inherited Palace and Park Glienicke. Despite the instruction in Charles' will that the heirs should spend each year 30,000 Mark on the park Friedrich Leopold neglected the park. When Germany became a republic in 1919 Palace and Park Glienicke remained part of the Prince's property. Palace and park suffered further neglect as Friedrich Leopold moved to Lugano in Switzerland and took several pieces of art with him to pay off his debts. In 1924 the Prussian state bought the part of Böttcherbergpark. A development plan of 1928 for that area was not carried out. Friedrich Leopold's intention to sell off the areas of the 1841 park extension was blocked by the Prussian state resulting in a lawsuit which ended with the Prince's death in 1931.

After the Nazi seizure of power in 1933 the City of Berlin bought most of the park in 1934 and 1935. Julius Lippert, Reichskommissar of Berlin pressed the legal guardian of the heir(a minor) to sell and used the confiscated assets of the German bank manager and art collector Herbert M. Gutmann to pay. The Prince's family kept a triangular area in the southwest of the park including palace and pleasure ground. The park was opened to the public and named Volkspark Glienicke(People's Park Glienicke) indicating Lippert's populist intention. The official opening was on Adolf Hitler's birthday. The following years the park suffered e.g. from the changes to the Berlin-Potsdam chaussee which became part of the Reichsstraße 1. After being appointed mayor of Berlin in 1937 Julius Lippert planned to have Glienicke as his official residence and let acquire the remaining part which was not owned by the city. In 1940 Lippert lost his office and the palace became a military hospital afterwards.

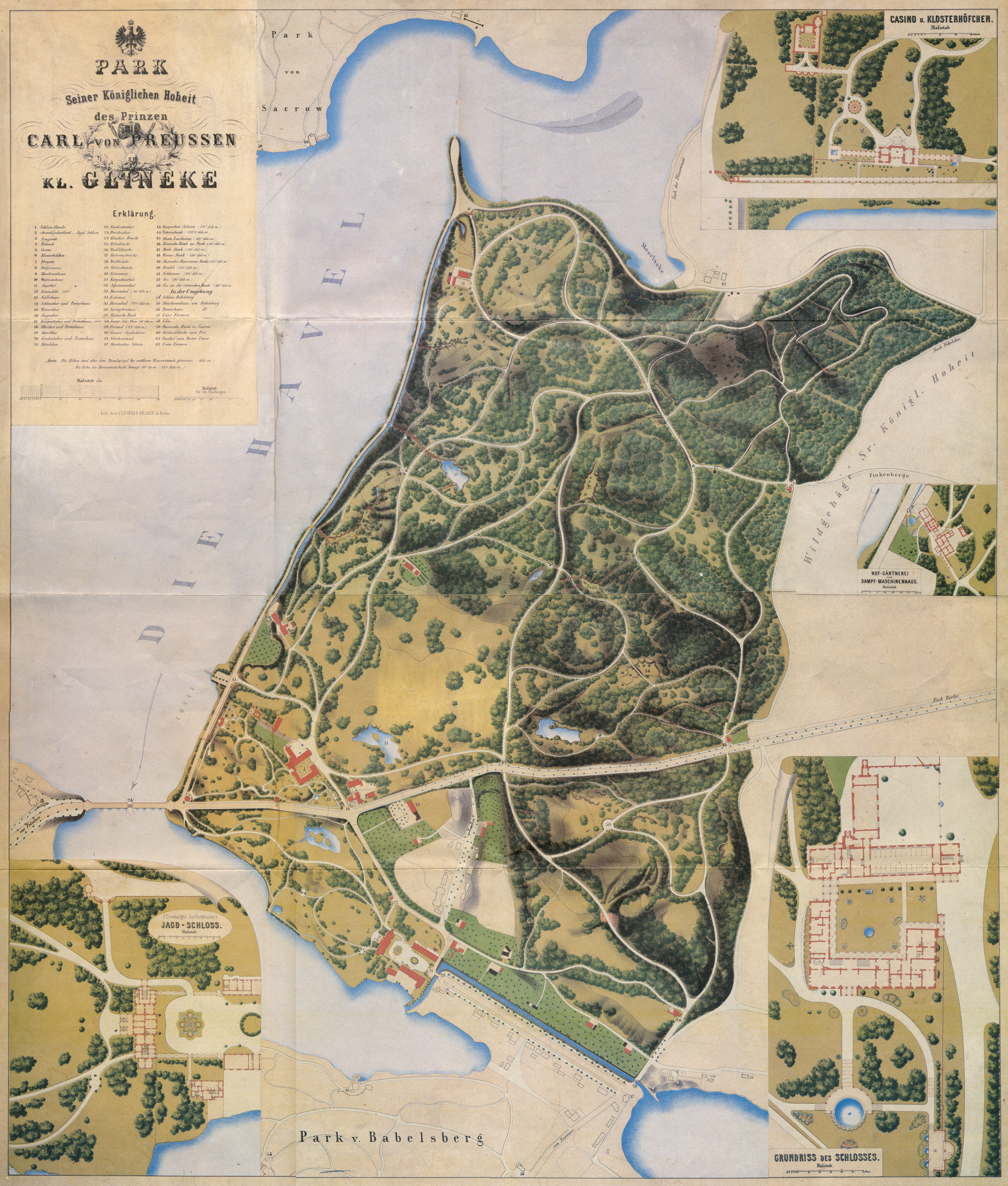
Lithographic map of Park Glienicke after last extensions, around 1862

After World War II early ideas to convert the park into a huge West Berlin sports complex close to the border to the Soviet occupation zone were dropped. In 1952 the park became a nature reserve. Besides the restoration of Palace Glienicke and some other buildings by Karl Friedrich Schinkel and his students since the 1950s it took until 1969 for the park itself being regarded as a work of art by the West Berlin city administration. Since 1978 a special department for the conservation and restoration of historic gardens focused on Tiergarten and Park Glienicke. In 1981 the "Schinkel Year" provided further public funding and in 1982 the whole ensemble of Palace and Park was registered as historic monument and historic garden respectively. The Berlin Wall along the Berlin-Potsdam Chaussee on the one hand caused the demolition of some Swiss chalets in the part of the Böttcherbergpark south of the chaussee, but on the other hand brought about the rebuilding of the chaussee to its original dimension.

After the German reunification the Palaces and Parks of Potsdam and Berlin were registered as UNESCO World Heritage Site on 1 January 1991. Since 1992 the park is part of the EU special protection area for wild birds "Western Düppel Forest" (Westlicher Düppeler Forst). In 2000 the Foundation for Prussian Palaces and Gardens in Berlin-Brandenburg, formed in 1995, took over permanently the pleasure ground and the gardens near the palace. The rest of the park has remained with the Borough of Steglitz-Zehlendorf.

== Garden areas around the Palace ==
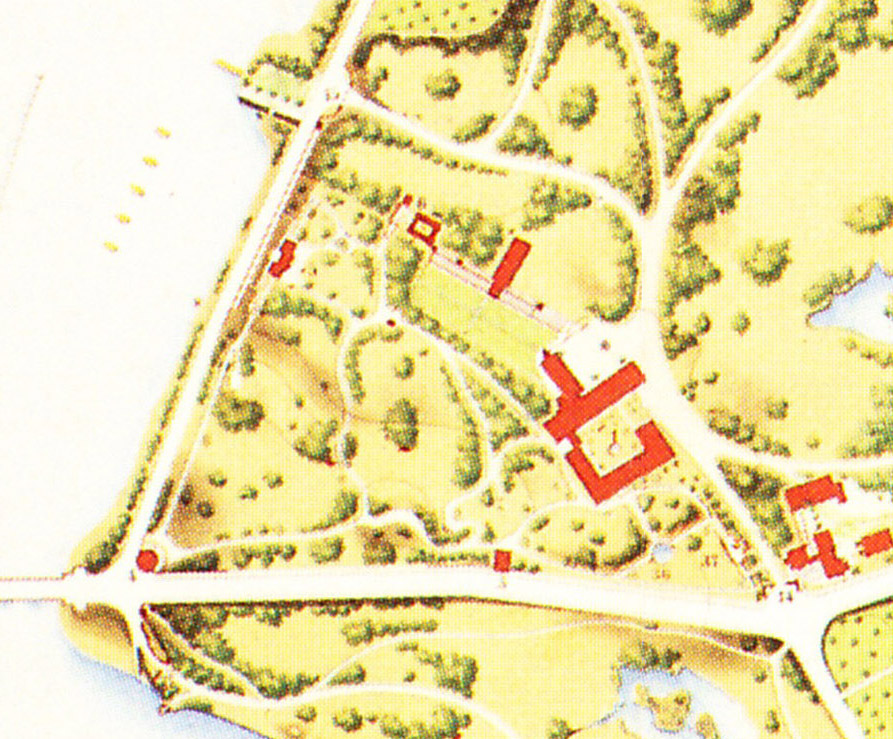
Pleasure ground, detail of map of 1862

Following the design guidelines by Humphry Repton for the classic English landscape garden Park Glienicke has the flower garden at the palace in the specific form of a garden courtyard. From 1816 on Lenné created the adjacent house garden, the pleasure ground, one of his early works and one of his masterpieces. The pleasure ground has seemingly a natural landscape, yet Lenné's whole design is artificial and artistic. The area was developed between palace, chaussee and bridge keeper's house. Lenné persuaded Hardenberg to buy a small farm estate, a so-called Büdnerei (de), on a flat terrain at the chaussee. The topography of the “Büdnerei” and of four terraces for growing fruit and wine(north of “Büdnerei”) vanished with the landscaping.

=== Flower beds ===
Elliptical and round flower beds with terracotta palmette borders are typical for garden courtyard and pleasure ground. The restoration was supported by discovering original border stones in the cellar of the Curiosity pavilion. In the underground the beds are walled in allowing for specific irrigation, therefore the pleasure ground has been crisscrossed with water pipes. As the clay pipes on Peacock Island lasted only ten years after being installed in 1824 expensive iron pipes supplied by the Prussian industrial pioneer F.A. Egells (de) were installed in Glienicke when in 1838 the pumping station started operating with a steam engine, a gift by Charles’ father which was also manufactured by F.A. Egells. The beds were filled with a loose subsoil which facilitated the quick replacement of plants. There are some figurative designed beds bordered with buxus which add to the pleasure ground an artificial aspect, e.g. the Oak Leaf bed near the Lions Fountain and the Diana(Greek:Artemis) or Pliny bed at the Casino. An Athena statue, which is now at the British Museum, stood in a niche on the northside of the Casino characterizing it as a place of art. Most striking is the Lilies bed beneath Charles' bedroom windows at the western facade of the palace. It is a heraldic sign referring to Charles' younger sister Louise who was married to Prince Frederick of the Netherlands. She was very supportive sending bulbs to Charles. In Glienicke planting of roses has been almost non-existent in contrast to Babelsberg Park and Peacock Island. The pleasure ground in Glienicke is rather a portrayal of an antique villa complex as described by Pliny the Younger than a reflexion on a longing for Italy(Italiensehnsucht).

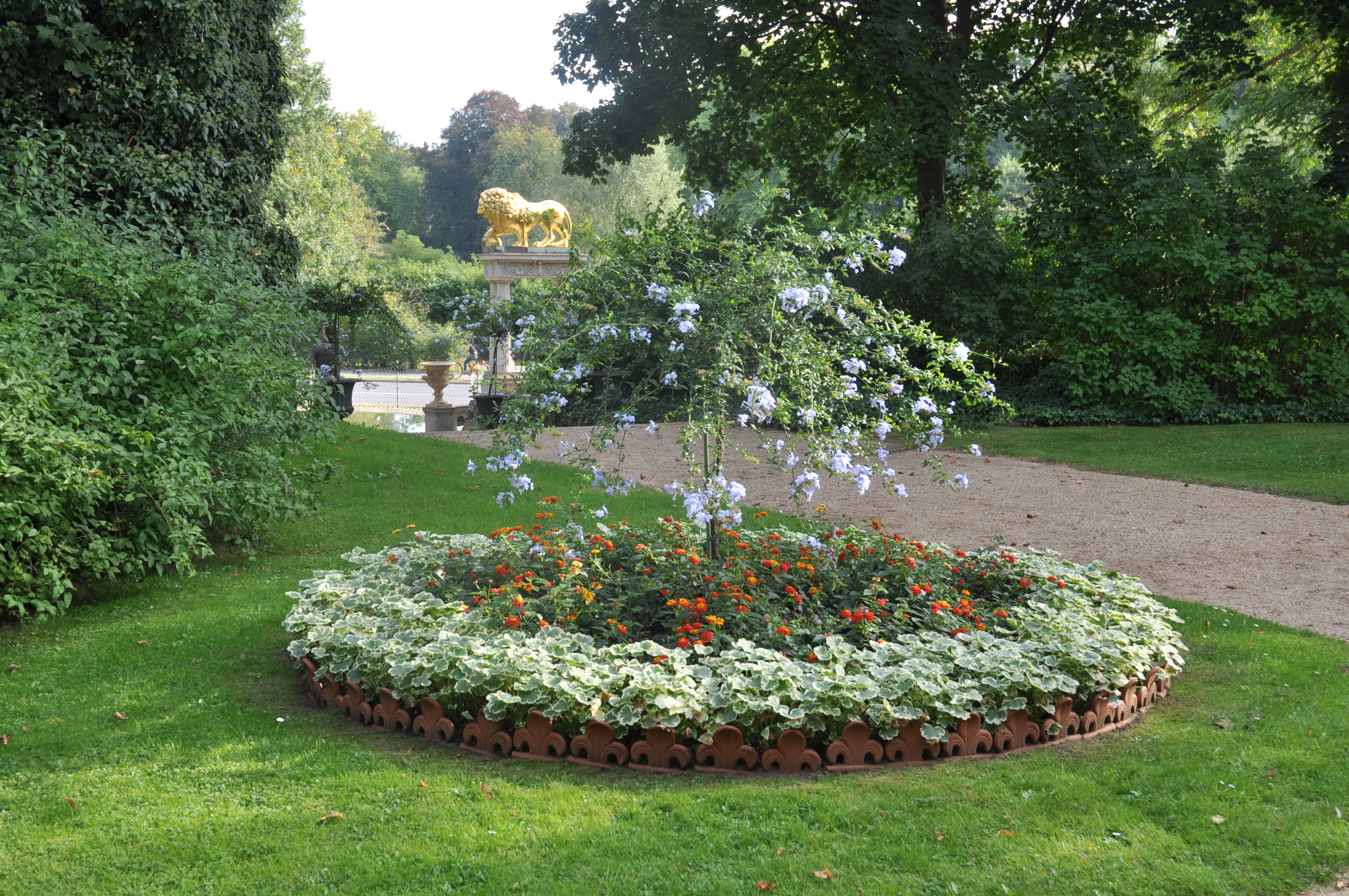
Flower bed with Plumbago and Lily-shaped border stones

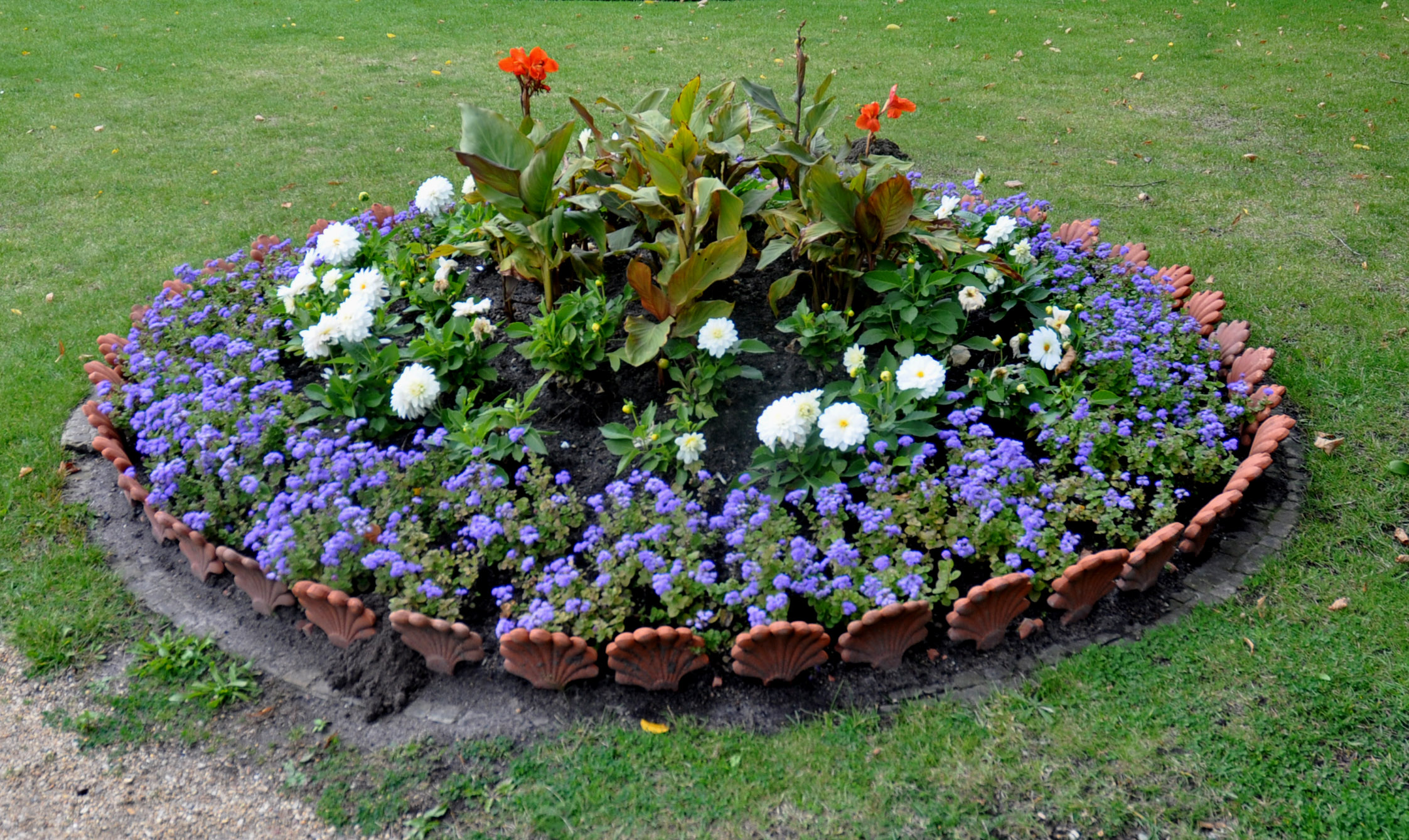
Flower bed with Canna near Lions Fountain

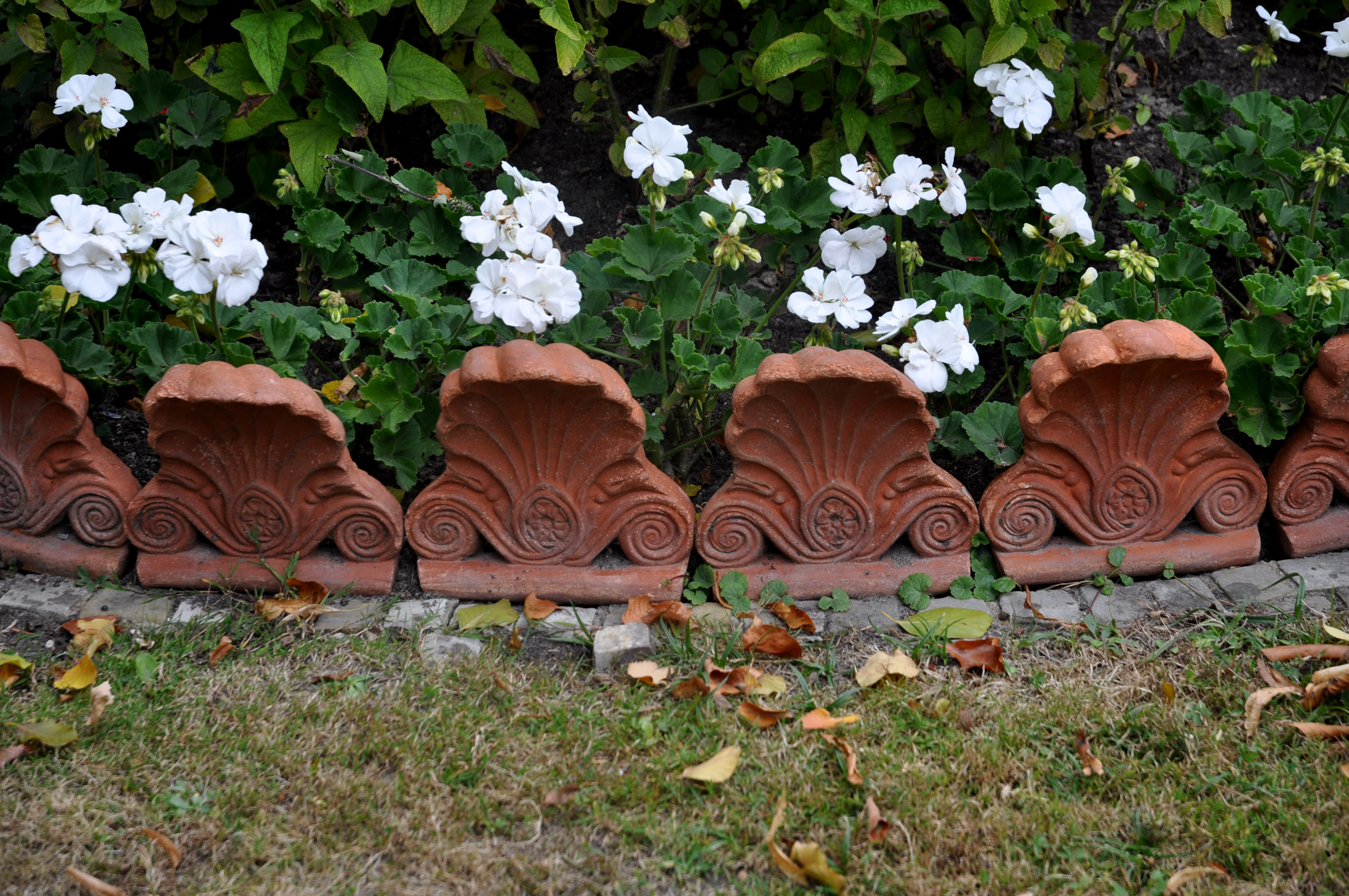
Palmette style border stones

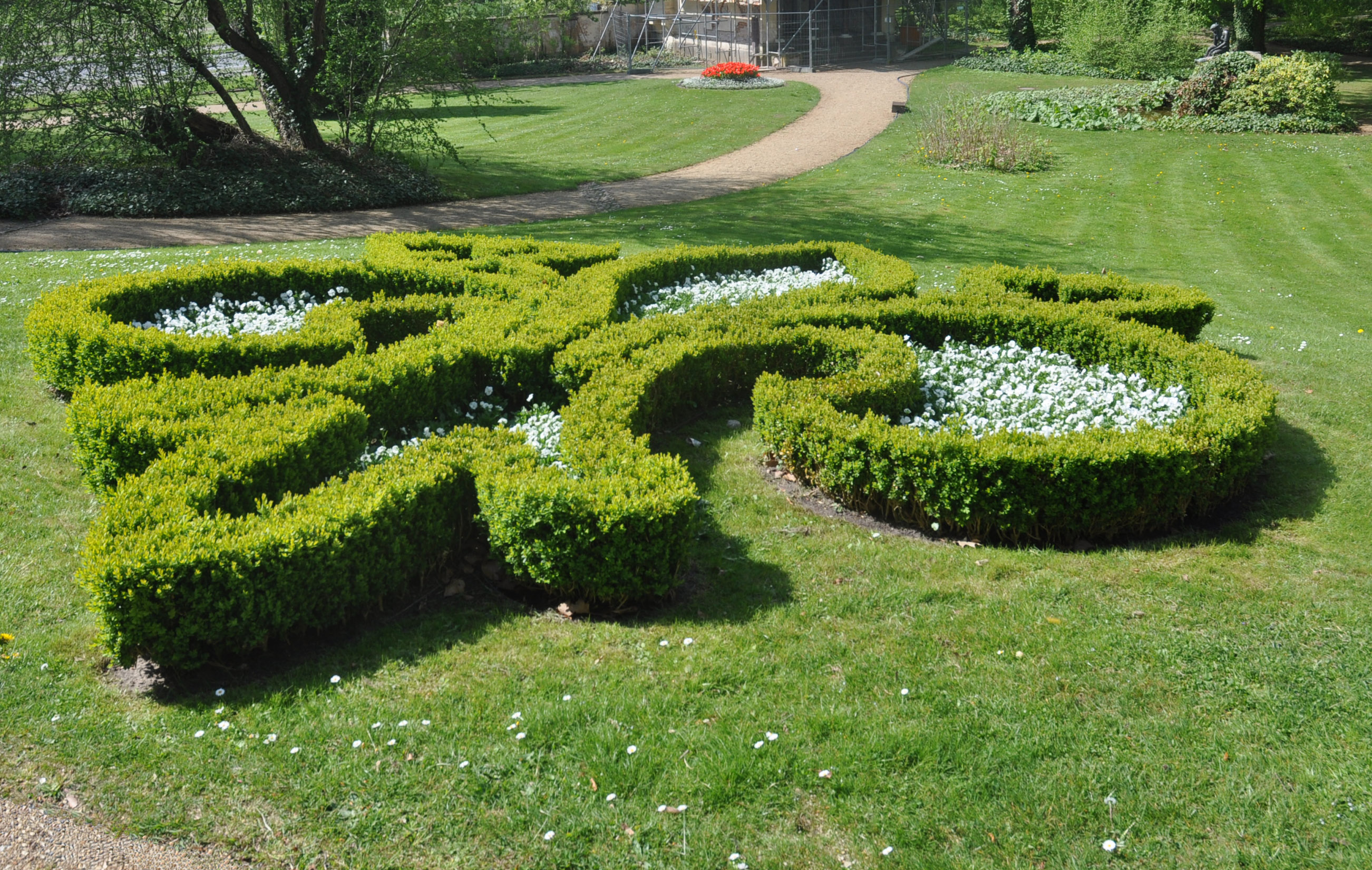
Lilies bed

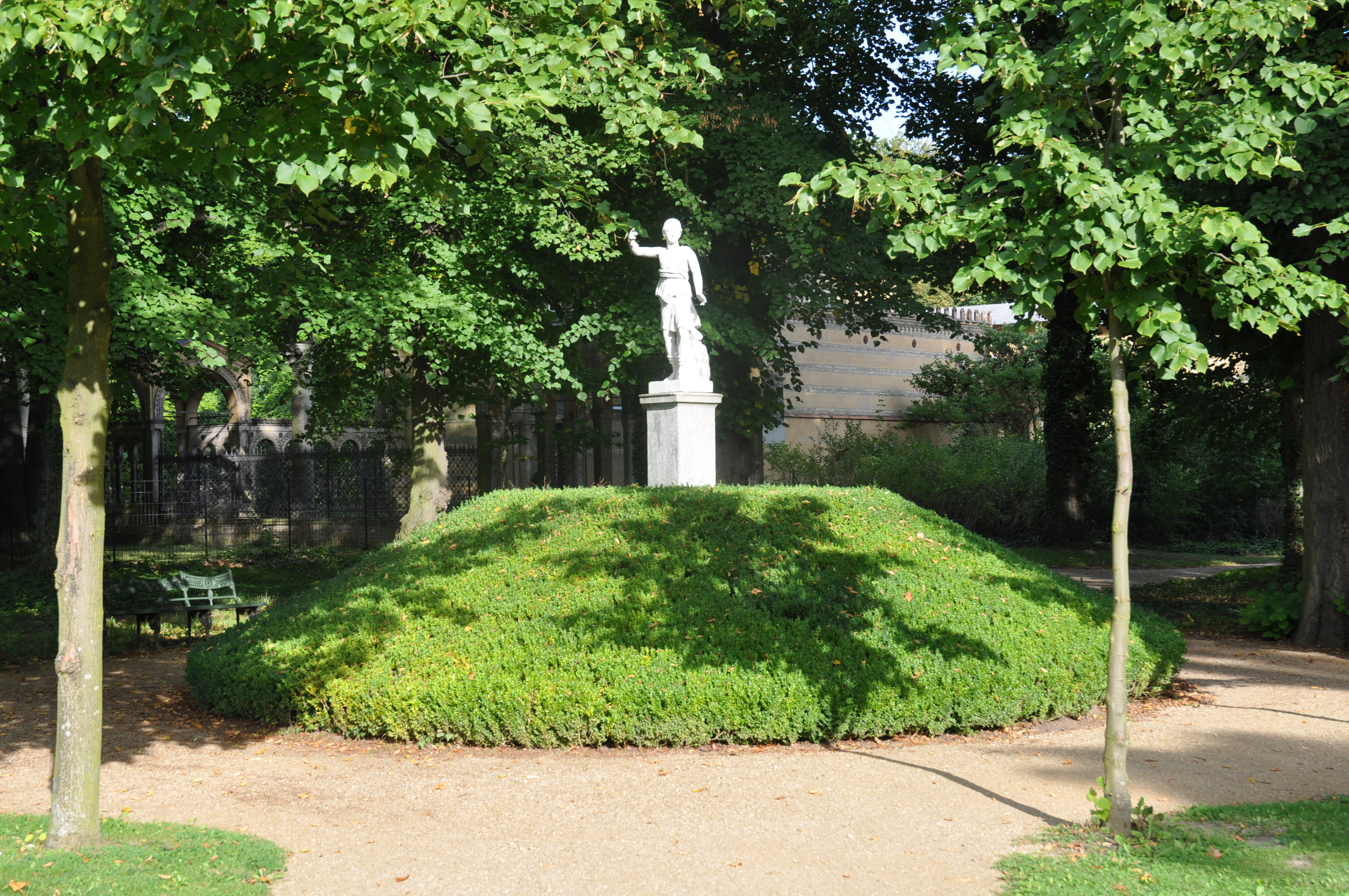
Diana/Pliny bed

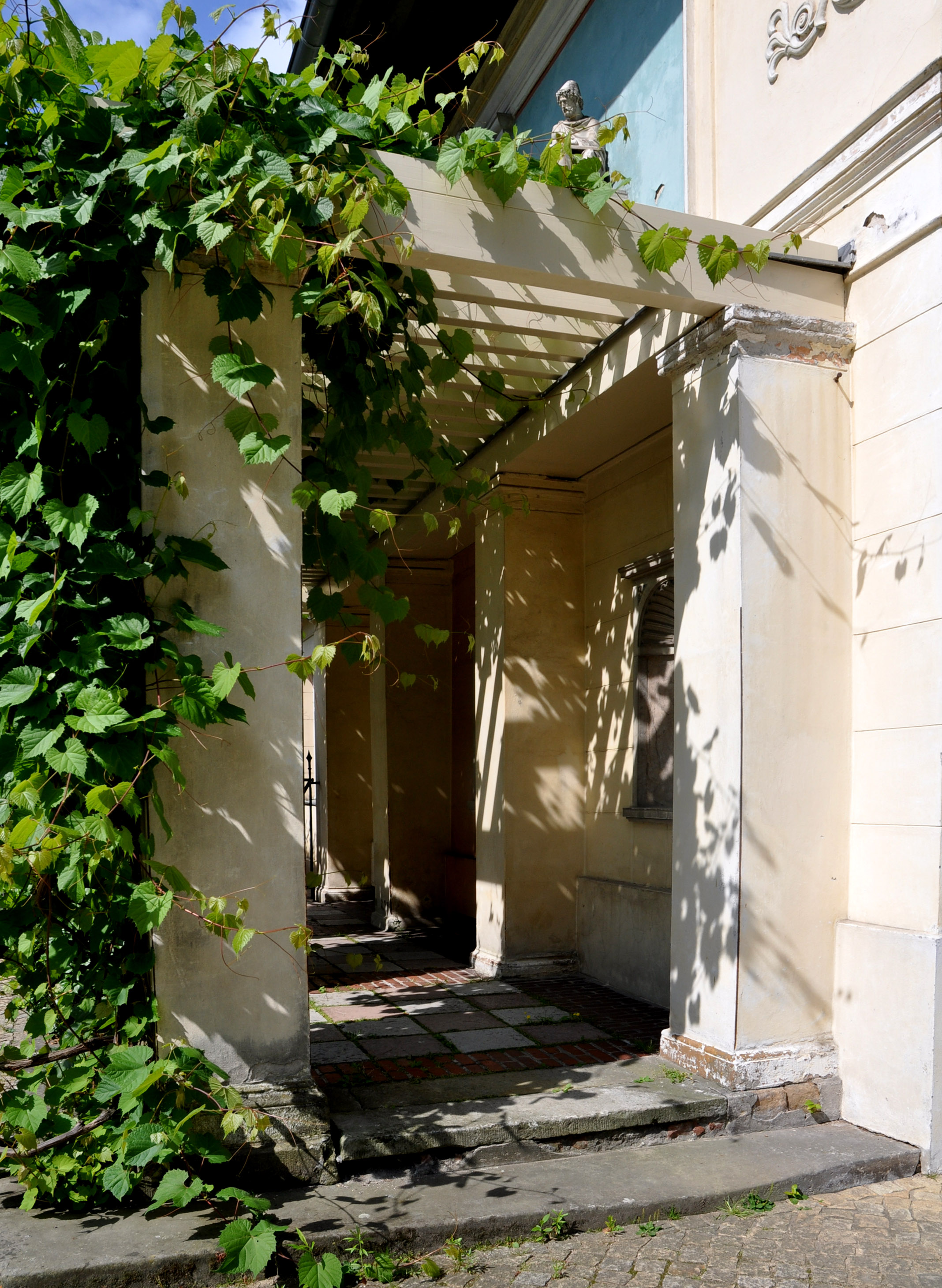
Vine Pergola covered with common grape vine

Vine Pergola and Adjutants’ Peristyle are the architectural links between garden courtyard and pleasure ground.

The pleasure ground itself has several architectural elements:

=== Lions Fountain ===
The planning for a big new fountain started after the construction of the pumping station began in 1836. On 23 October 1837 Prince Charles, Schinkel, Persius and Lenné met in Glienicke to discuss the fountain near the greenhouse which Count von Lindenau commissioned at the end of the 18th century. Schinkel drafted the fountain and a new greenhouse which never got beyond the design stage as on its site Persius build the Stibadium in 1840. The Lions Fountain has two gilded cast-iron sculptures of Medici lions which were a present by Charlotte to her brother Charles on his 30th birthday in 1831. The lions were placed on two high, zinc cast pedestals, which flank the fountain, each resting on four zinc cast Doric columns concealing the iron supporting structure. Charlotte and her husband, the Russian Emperor, were present at the official opening of the fountain on 2 June 1838. On the balustrade at the rear of the fountain, which is divided by the flight of steps from the palace, were placed four allegorical terracotta statues (created around 1855) describing both commerce, science, art and military as the cornerstones of the state and the four seasons. The creator of the statues was probably Christian Daniel Rauch's student Alexander Gilli (de) who was “court sculptor” in Glienicke. Through the years the jet of water changed. At first a simple jet of water was projected vertically from a triton statue. Later that changed to aigrette and bell shapes. Also the Lions sculptures spouted water. The Lions Fountain has become a symbol for Park Glienicke. The view from the chaussee to the fountain with the palace in the background was the most common subject of the numerous vedute of Park Glienicke. After World War II the whole fountain was in a ruinous state. During the restoration from 1960 to 1964 most of the parts above ground had to be renewed. Fifty years later the fountain had again serious construction defects. After the fall of a tree on the fountain the restoration could not be delayed anymore. As in 2009 the work started more defects were discovered and investigated. Financed by considerable private donations the restoration was completed in August 2010.

=== Curiosity Pavilion ===
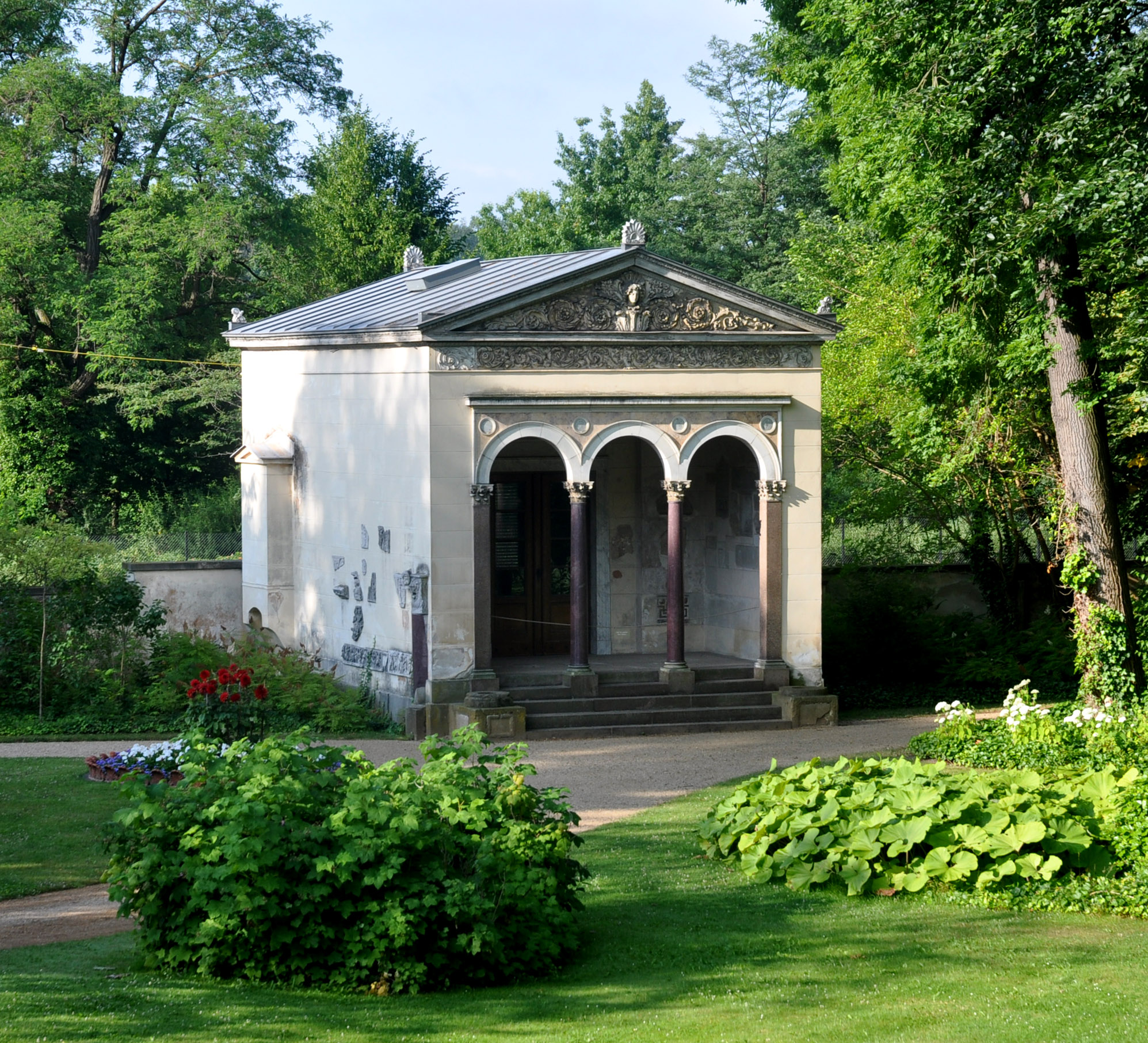
Curiosity Pavilion, view from garden

The pavilion named Curiosity dates back to 1796 and was rebuilt in strict Doric order by Schinkel in 1825. It has a cellar. Its name derives from the fact that it could be used to watch the traffic on the adjacent Berlin-Potsdam chaussee through the shutters while being invisible to passers-by. Around 1848 the pavilion became a place for arts collection. Spolia were inserted in the entrance hall. At the same time a Florentine Renaissance arcade was installed as a cover on the garden façade. Already in 1842 the arcade was bought from the Russian arts collector Anatoly Demidov who lived in Florence.

=== Stibadium ===
The Stibadium was designed by Friedrich Ludwig Persius and built on the site of a neoclassical greenhouse with a garden room(built after 1796) in 1840. The semi-circular Tholos structure with a wooden half-cone roof was the main place for having tea. On the underside of the roof a twelve deities programme is painted. As there are 14 fields the Twelve Olympians were supplemented with Bacchus and Amphitrite. The middle pillar had originally a zinc-cast Kore designed by August Kiss which later was replaced with a marble copy of the Felicitas Publica in the monument Max-Joseph Denkmal by Christian Daniel Rauch in Munich. On the terrace stands a granite bowl by Christian Gottlieb Cantian which Charles inherited after his father died in 1840. The Stibadium had the function to be a shield between pleasure ground and Drive. It had also the opposite purpose of the Curiosity pavilion. While looking on the common people from such an elevated and prestigious building the Prince's tea party was on show to the people at the same time. The paintings of the Twelve Olympians may seem presumptuous, yet they are an artistic expression of how Prussian aristocrats saw themselves in the age of European Restoration.

=== Rotunda ===
After Glienicke Bridge was rebuilt in stone in 1834 Prince Charles asked for a round summerhouse at the new corner of the garden. Based on ancient examples Schinkel designed a Rotunda in which the first tea party took place on 2 July 1835. At Prince Charles’ instigation the pavilion was crowned with the reproduction of the Choragic Monument of Lysicrates. The completed rotunda was opened with a big party on 16 August 1837. Rotunda, stone bridge and the residence Villa Schöningen on the opposite bank of the river Havel formed a little architectural ensemble on its own. This was destroyed when the stone bridge was replaced by the steel bridge in 1907. In 1935 the Rotunda was moved furthermore when the Berlin-Potsdam chaussee was expanded and became part of the Reichsstraße 1.

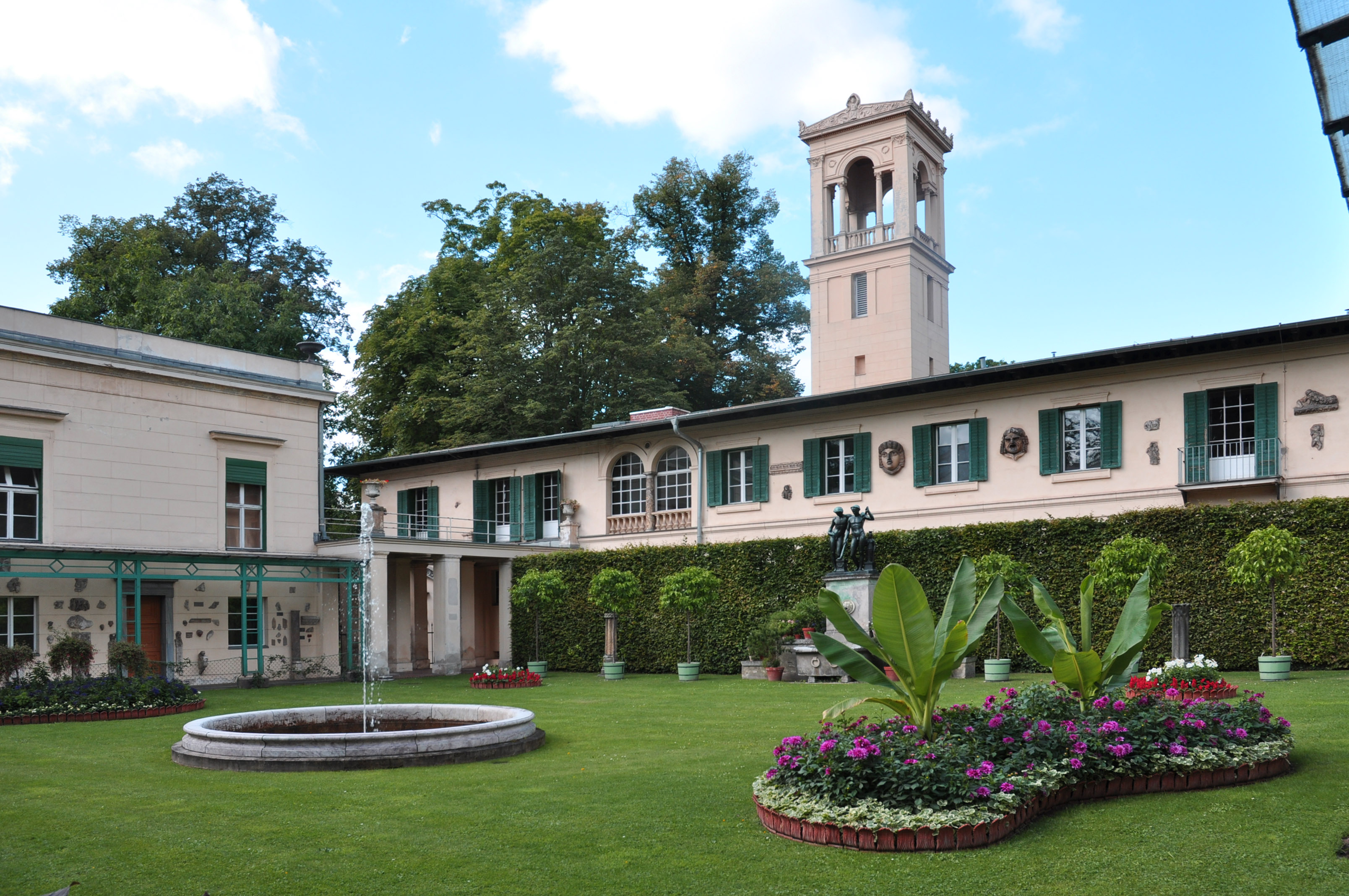
Garden courtyard

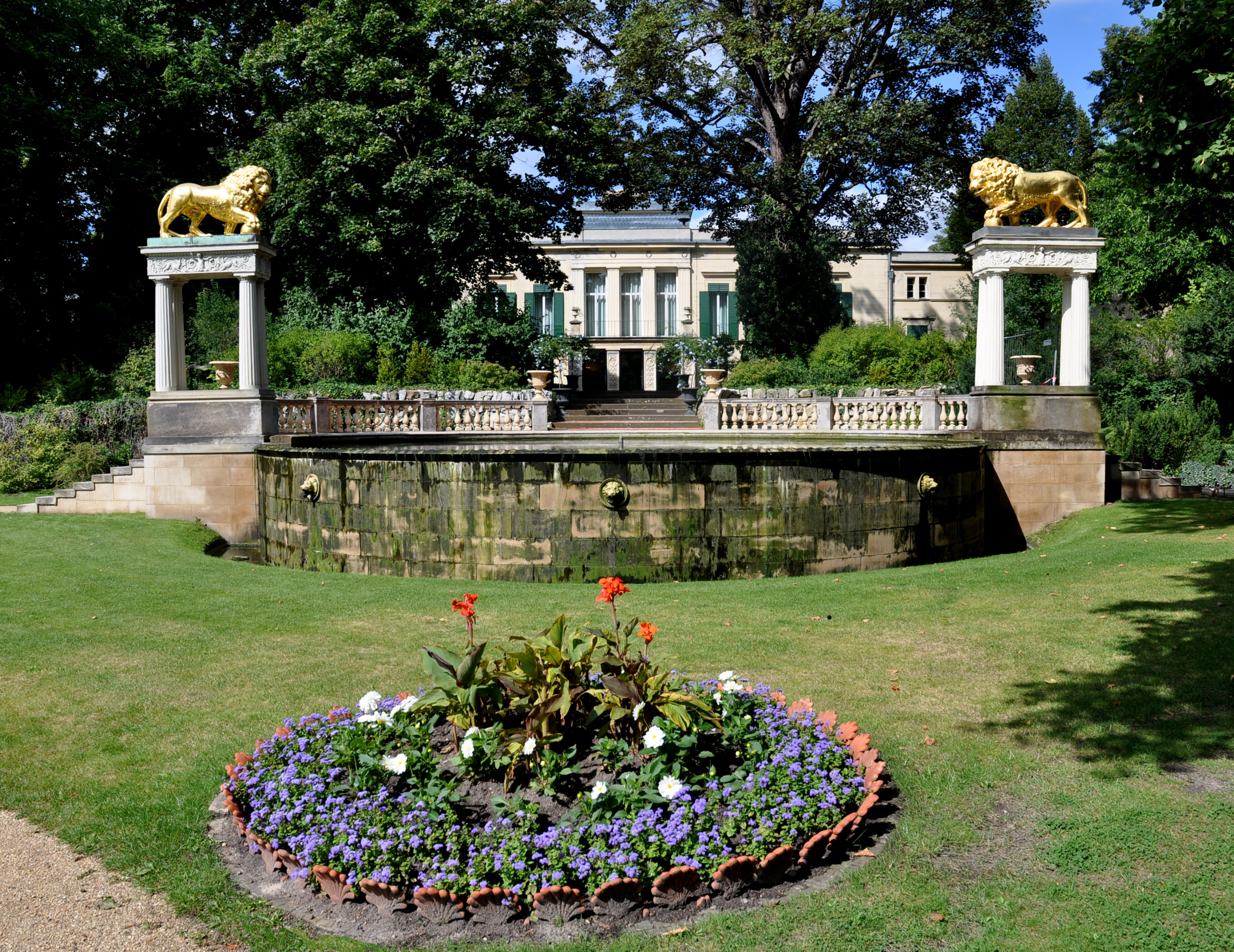
Lions Fountain, view from south, in the back the Palace

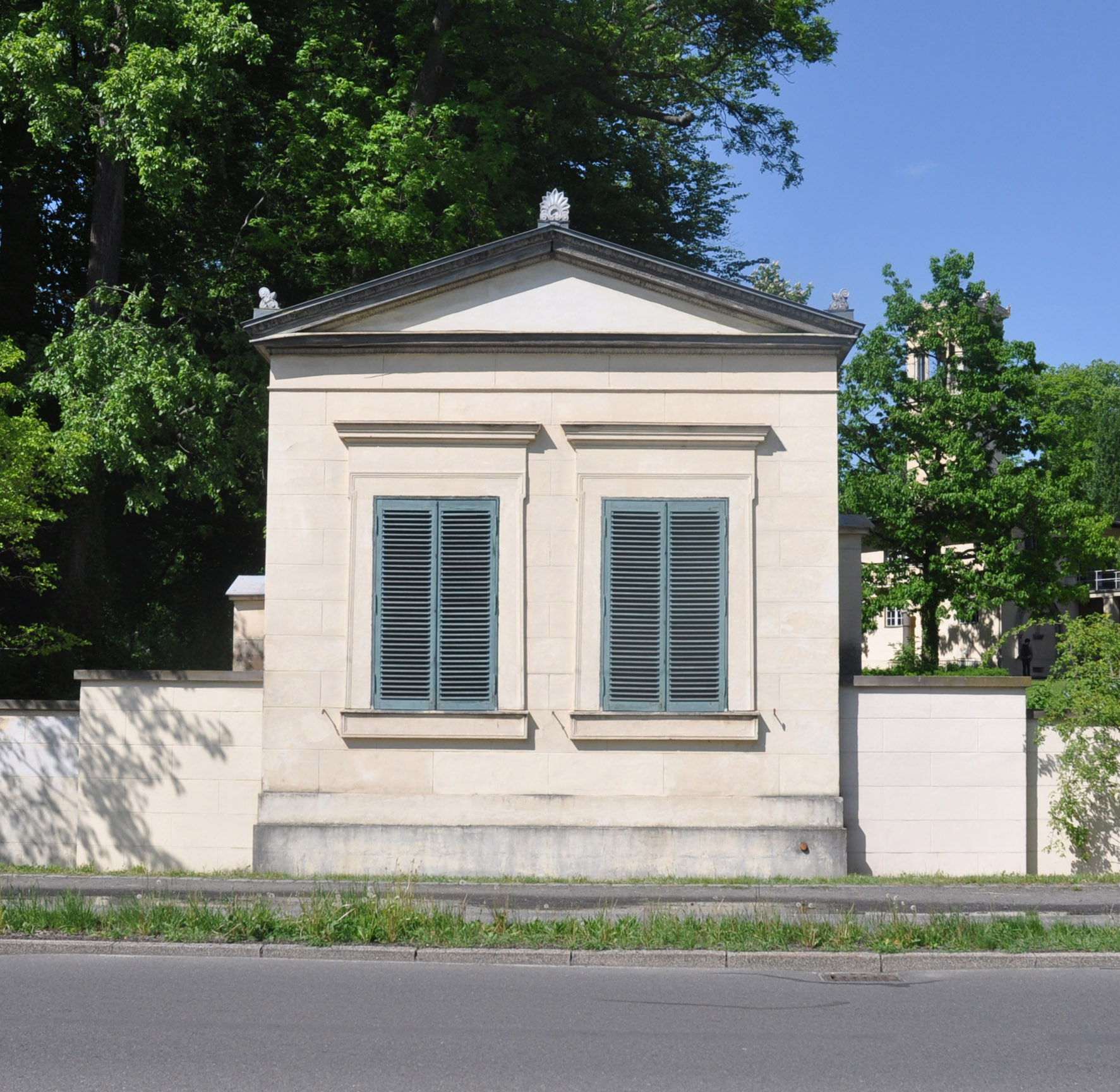
Pavilion Curiosity, southside facing chaussee

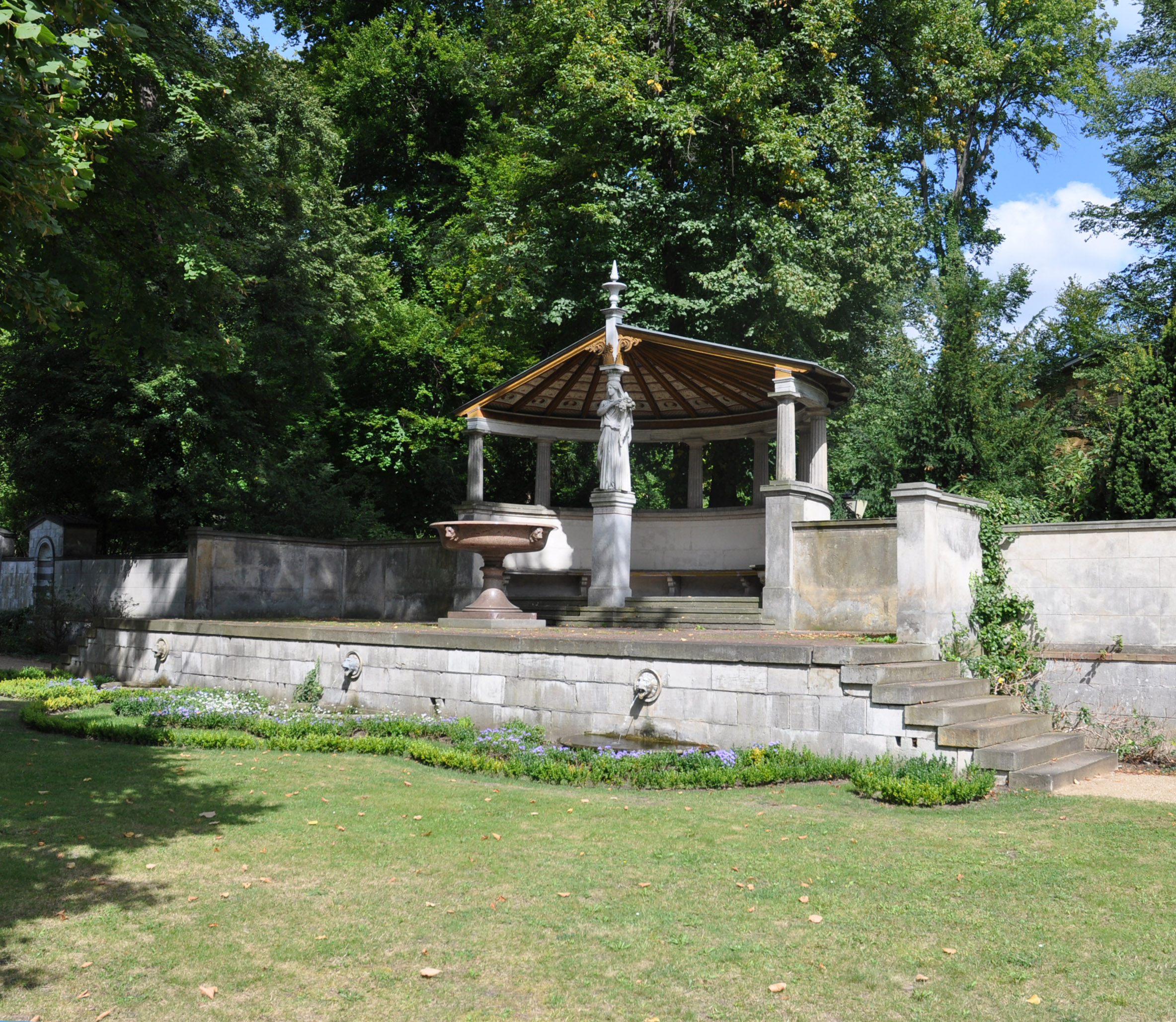
Stibadium, view from southwest

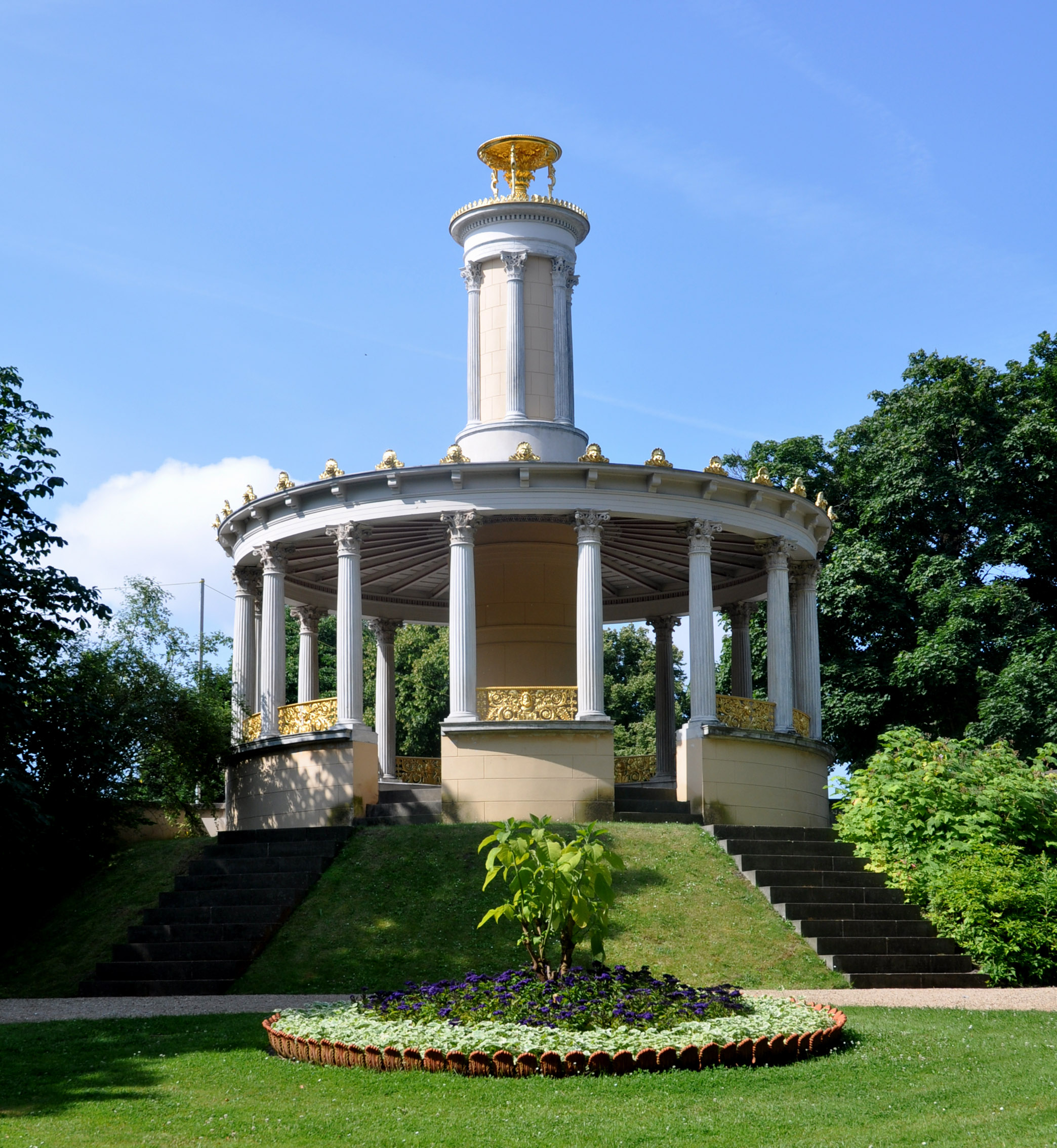
Rotunda, view from garden

=== Casino ===
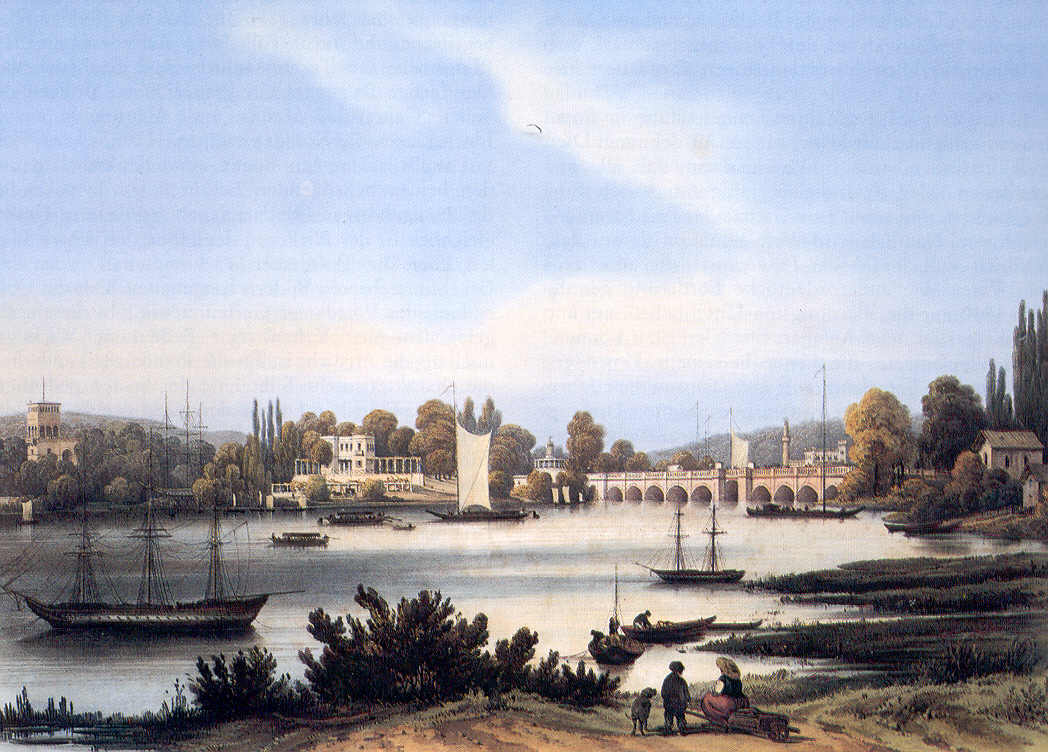
Glienicke waterfront, from left: Water tower/Pumping station, Dummy Frigate, Casino, Rotunda, Bridge; foregrund left on river: miniature frigate Royal Luise(2nd, 1831) (F. X. Sandmann, 1845)

North of the Rotunda at the shore of Jungfernsee lies the two-storey Casino from 1824. Its terrace, overlooking the lake, was the most beautiful place for having tea. It was the first building Schinkel designed for Prince Charles. On the one hand its name refers to a one-storey building previously used to play billiards in it, which Schinkel redesigned; on the other hand there is the Italian origin of the word "Casino" and that the building resembles country houses at the Gulf of Naples. In autumn and winter 1822/23 Charles had accompanied his father and his brother William on a four and a half month journey to Italy, where they spent four weeks in the Naples region visiting the excavation sites of Herculaneum and Pompeii.

=== Dummy Frigate ===
Just north of the Casino was a dummy frigate, designed by Schinkel, on an artificial peninsula which presumably was thrown up as a bank of earth only in the 18th century serving as wharf for the ships transporting bricks and limestone. After the kilns were closed down in 1824 the peninsula became a mooring and was included in the garden design. The wooden construction of the frigate with three tall masts was used as a toolshed for the sailors who operated the Prince's miniature fleet. The dummy frigate was singular in the German landscape architecture. Presumably the Prince was inspired to having such a construction by travelling as a 13-year-old aboard the miniature frigate (first Royal Luise) which in 1814 the Prussian King Frederick William III received as present from the British King George III, a coalition partner in the Napoleonic Wars.

=== Orangery and Greenhouses ===
After the pumping station at the shore was finished in 1838 Persius designed and built up-to-date greenhouses and an orangery in 1839. The buildings were erected to the west of the coach house at the edge of the pleasure ground where three little greenhouses stood previously. The arcade of the orangery referred to the adjacent coach house. The greenhouses, flanked by little water towers, were aligned to the south at the southern gable end of the orangery. Figs, peaches, pineapple, prunes and strawberries were grown in the greenhouses. The area in front of the greenhouses was used for extensive seedbeds. Orangery and one part of the greenhouses were demolished in 1940 and reconstructed in 1981.

=== Cloister Courtyard ===
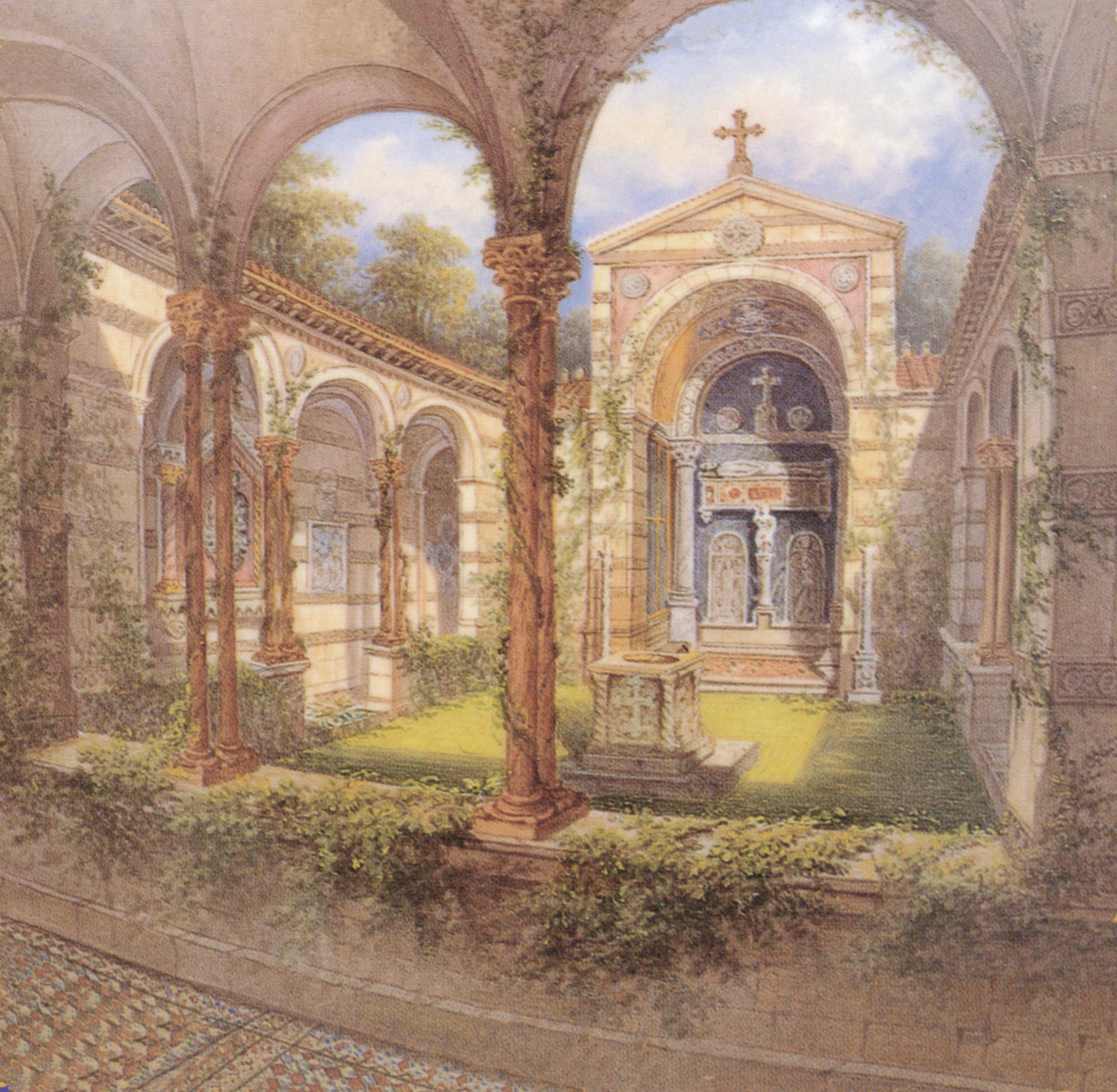
Cloister Courtyard, painting on vase, 1854

In 1850 the Cloister Courtyard between Casino and the greenhouses was erected as the last building on the pleasure ground. The formal reason for the building was to house Charles' extensive collections of medieval art and Byzantine sculptures. Historic building parts were purchased in Venice to be used as spolia in the Cloister Courtyard where Charles developed the first collection of Byzantine works of art in modern Europe. The building has been described as a political statement by Prince Charles in the aftermath of the revolution of 1848. It is regarded as a tribute to the Byzantine Empire as a God-given unity of throne and altar in the Late Antiquity and Middle Ages. Furthermore, it is seen as a hidden tribute to Russia and its political order as the Russian emperors saw themselves as successors of the Byzantine Emperors. The Cloister Courtyard represents an unusual mixture of a romantic architecture depicting the contemporary atmosphere and of the function as a museum, so to speak a very late Hermitage with scientific pretension and political statement. Part of the collection in the Cloister Courtyard was the Imperial Throne of Goslar which Charles acquired with the help of his former tutor Heinrich Menu von Minutoli who had fostered Charles’ interest in antiquities. The throne was kept together with other medieval treasures in a chapel-like vault. In 1871 Charles loaned the throne to his brother Emperor William I to be used as the Emperor's seat in the imperial ceremony opening the first Berlin Reichstag. Charles left the throne in his will to the town of Goslar. The most precious relief on the walls of the Cloister Courtyard was a late 12th century tondo of the Byzantine Emperor. Nowadays only a reproduction is on display. The original is part of the Byzantine Collection of the Dumbarton Oaks Museum in Georgetown, Washington, D.C..

=== Coach House Courtyard and Palace Tower ===
The Coach House Courtyard dates from 1828 (design by Schinkel) and housed Charles' collection of coaches. The four arches refer to the Roman Agoranomion in Athens which Schinkel and his contemporaries thought of as the most important arch architecture of the "Old Greeks". The Palace Tower adjacent to the coach house was built in 1832 and was used as a difficult to climb vantage point. Charles called the tower the “Good Charles”(Guter Carl). In 1874 a late neoclassical observation loggia was put on the tower and the coach house was expanded including a second storey which was removed after World War II.

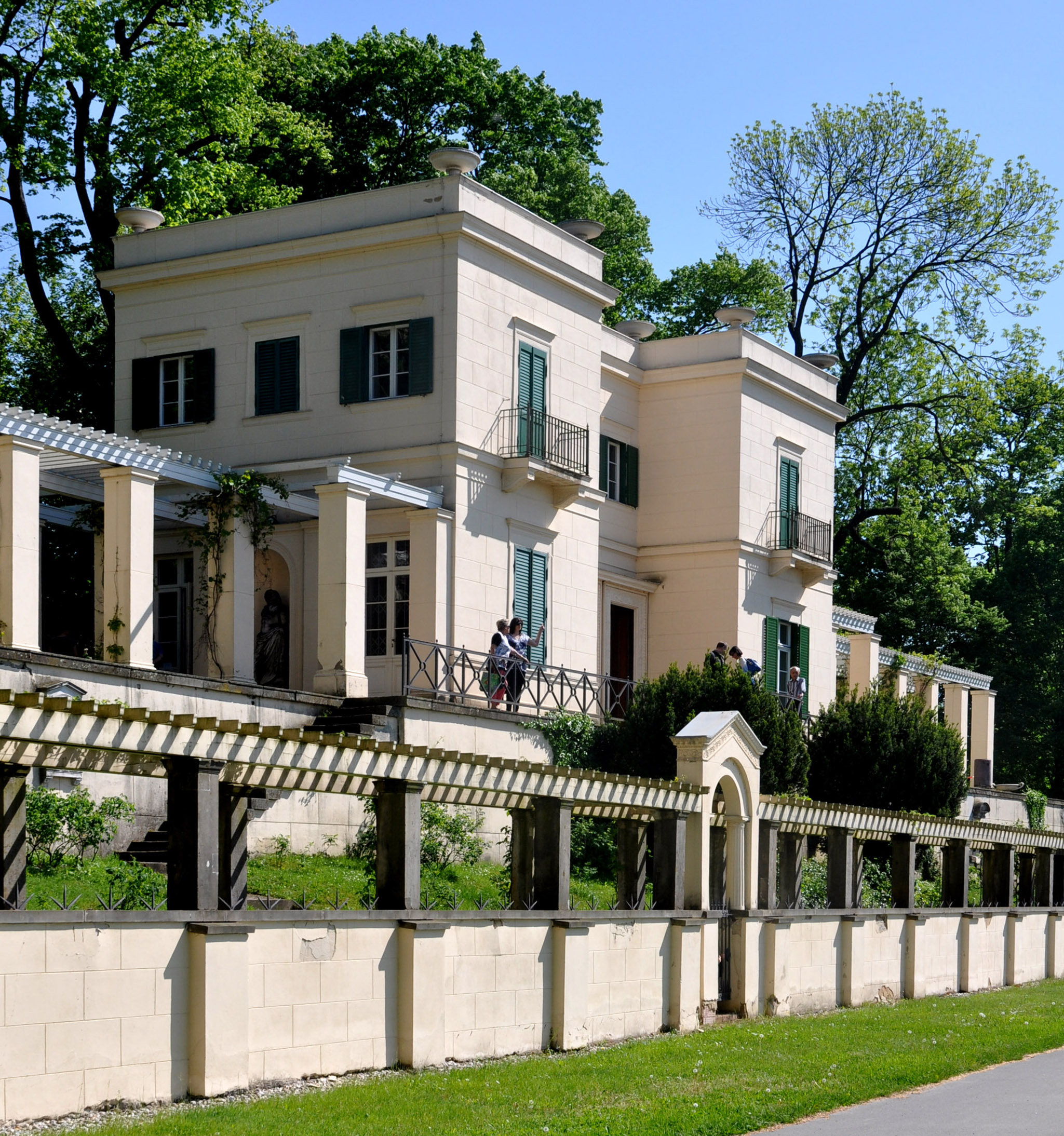
Casino, view from waterfront chaussee

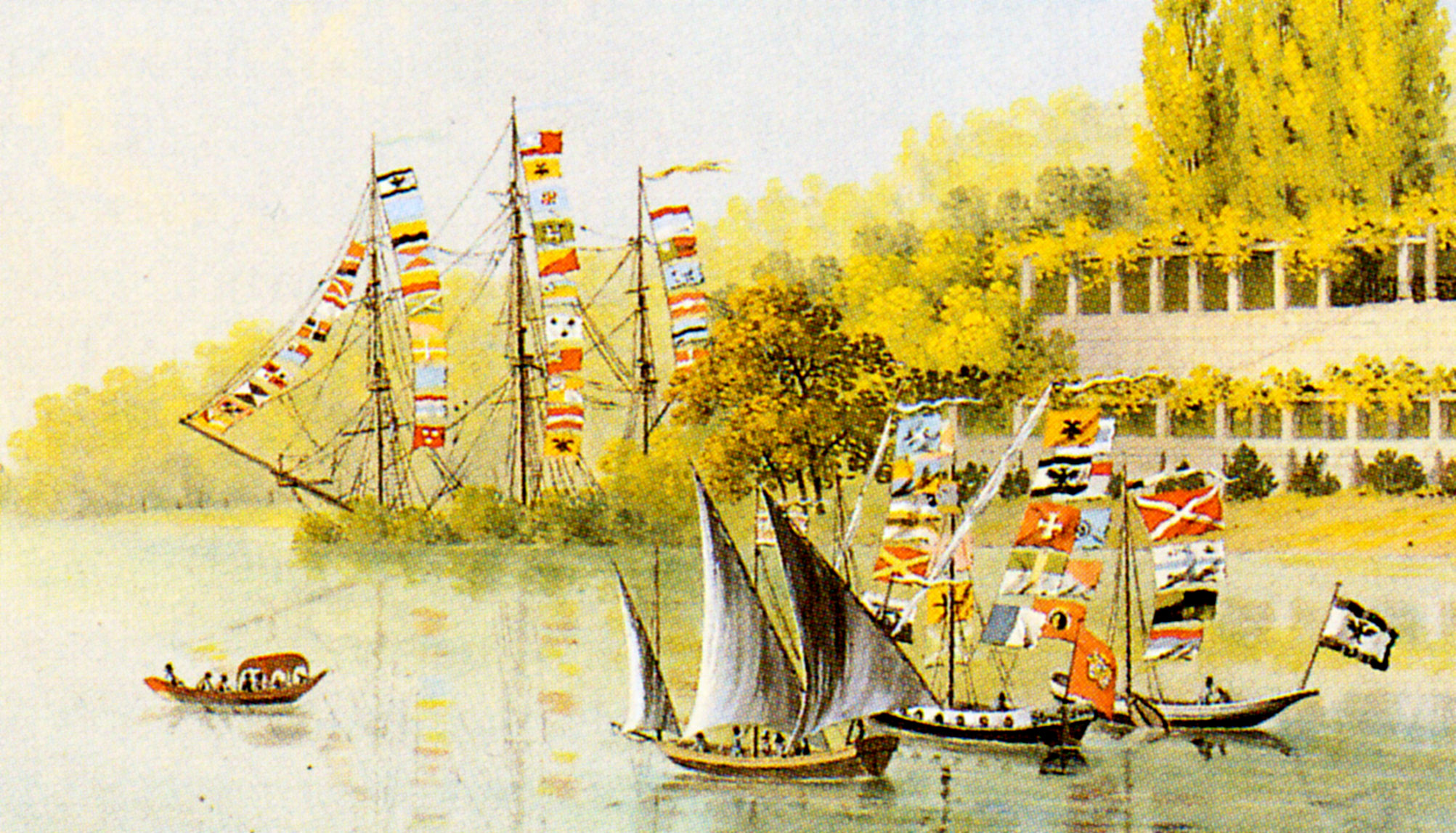
Dummy frigate on a holiday (H. J. Bleuler, 1830, detail)

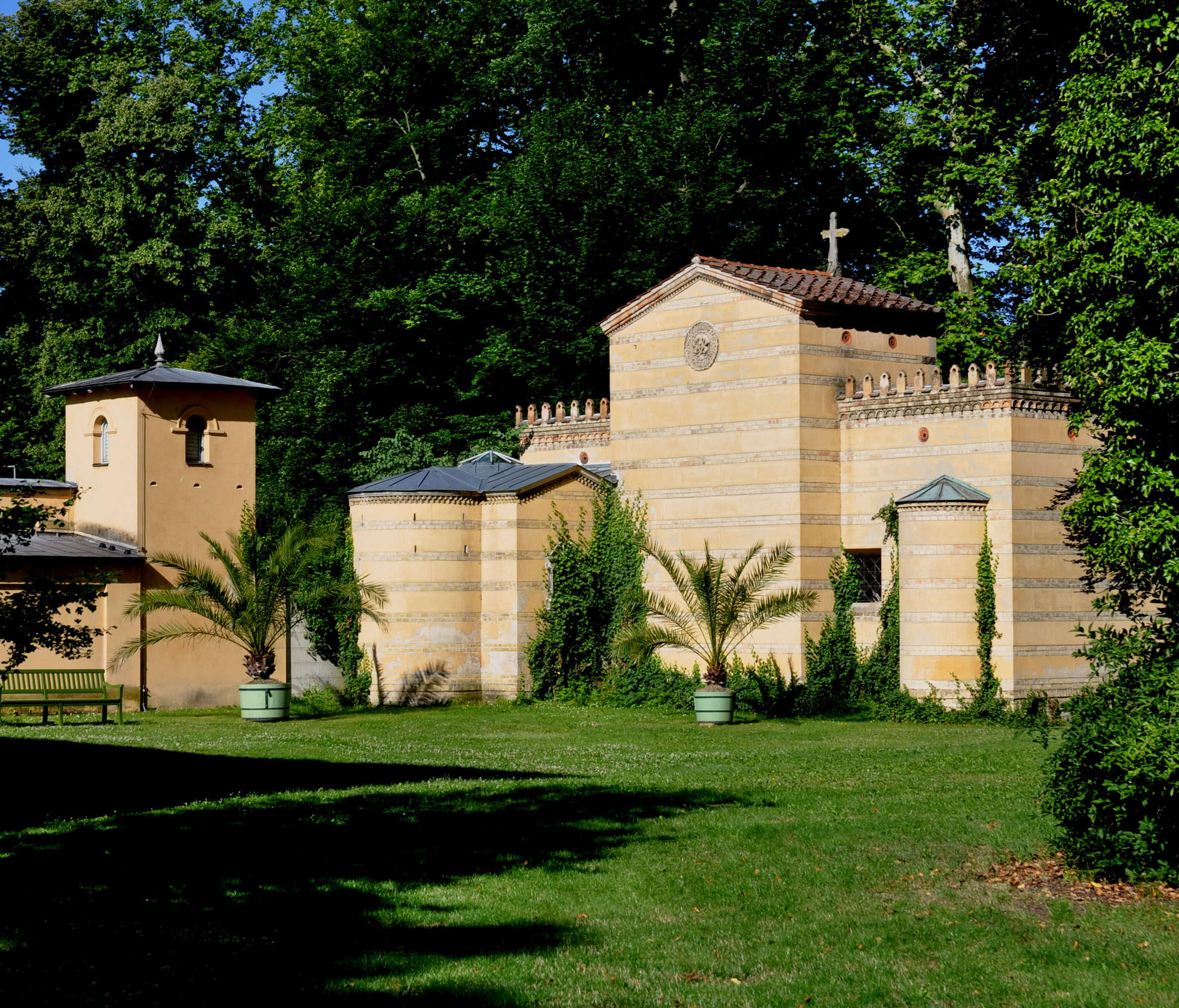
Cloister Courtyard, backside

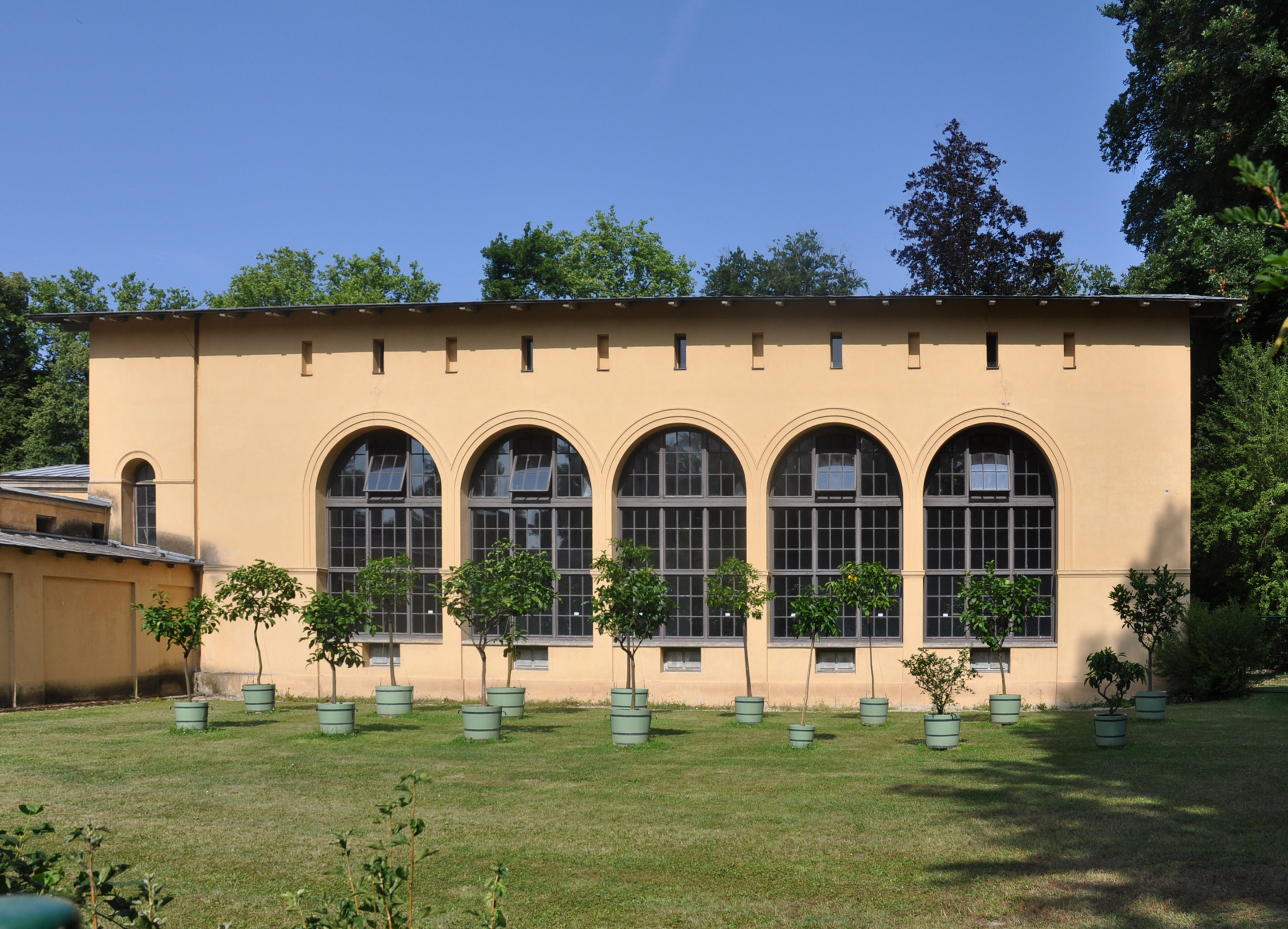
Orangery, view from east

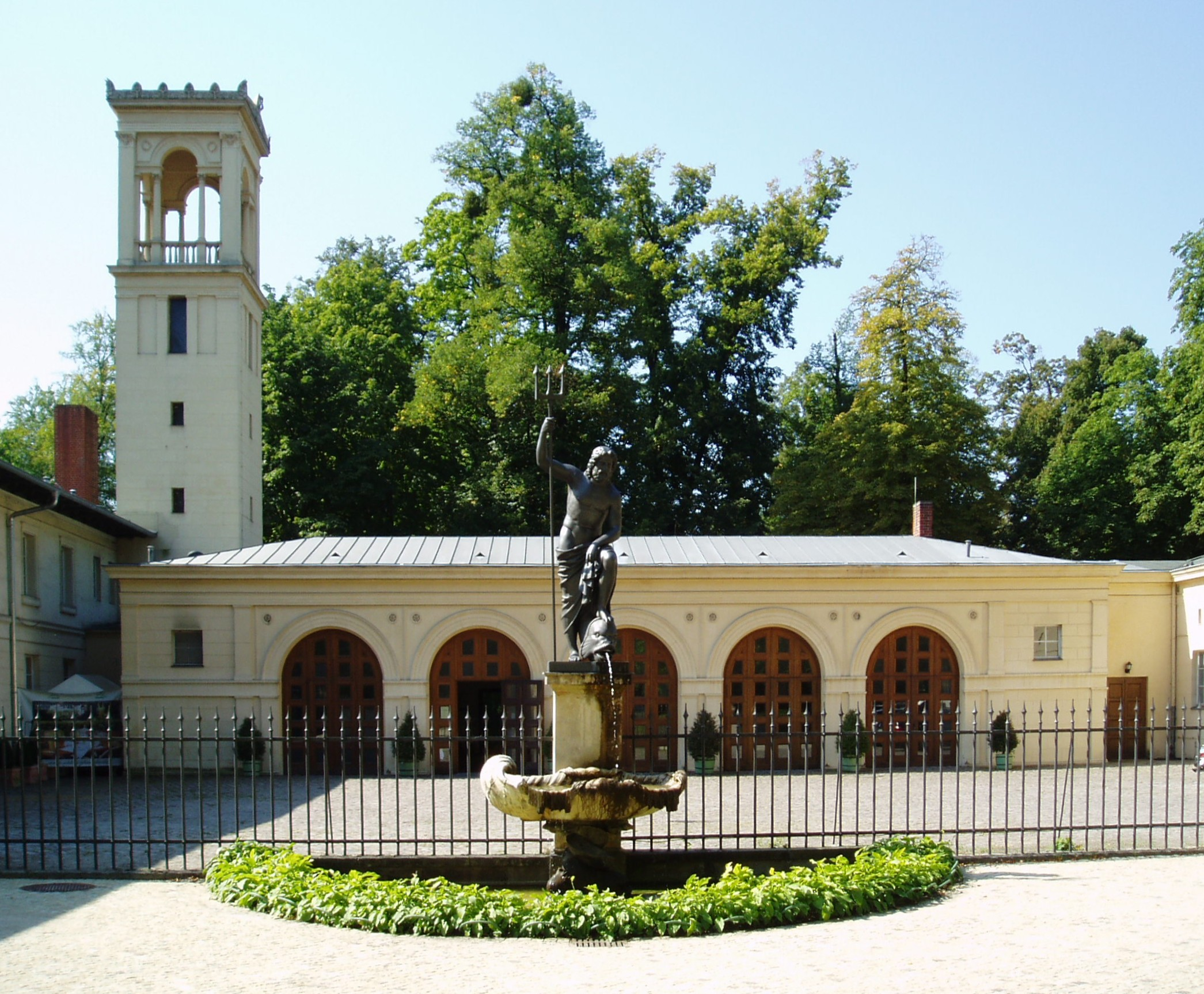
Coach house courtyard and Palace tower

=== Garden Furniture and Pergolas ===
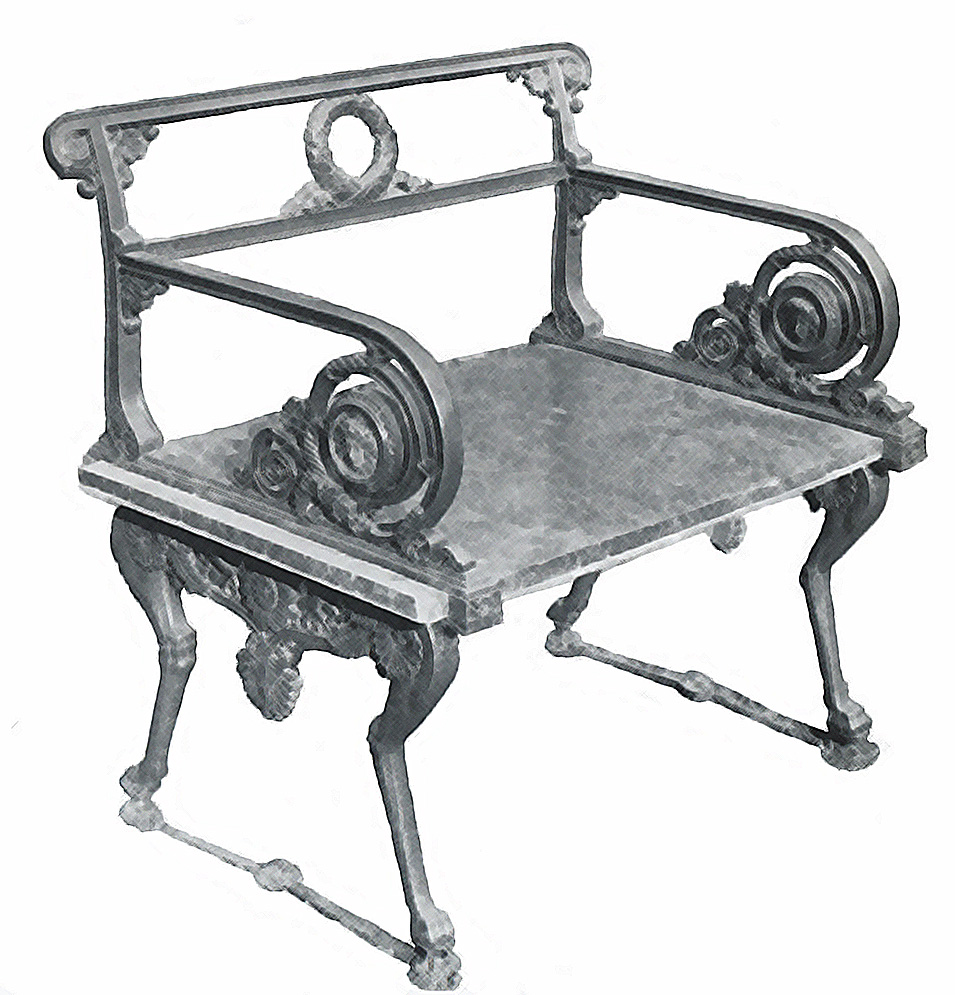
Wrought iron garden chair, around 1830

The wrought iron garden furniture is missing. Due to its great weight it was probably kept at outdoor places for the tea parties during the summer season which lasted from 1 May(day of purchase of Glienicke) until 3 November (Hubertus's hunt). Some of the garden furniture was probably designed by Schinkel, other parts were in Louis Quinze style or Empire style. Wrought iron benches were presumably placed at smaller vantage points like e.g. the Lilac Pergola on the Lenné hill(as it is called nowadays) or the Lime Trees Pergola. The Lime Trees Pergola is the only non-architectural pergola in Glienicke which is still visible today. It consists of eight lime trees at a junction near the Cloister Courtyard which are the remains of the late 18th century geometrical aligned avenue trees. Near Lions Fountain and Stibadium the “Sphingentreppe”, a low rise flight of steps, is covered with a trellis designed by Persius. The flight of steps is named after the Sphinx statues placed at the foot of the steps which like the ill-fitting steps are from the demolished neoclassical greenhouse with a garden room at the site of today's Stibadium.

=== Smaller Architectural Elements ===
There are some smaller architectural elements on the pleasure ground. Near the Lions Fountain a mosaic floor marks a former place for tea parties under the former King's Lime Tree which was one of the most impressive solitary trees on the estate. In front of the Curiosity pavilion is the “La Laitière“ Fountain. It is an erratic crowned with a milkmaid bronze sculpture. The sculpture was a gift to Charles by his sister Charlotte in 1827. It was a copy of the original sculpture by Russian sculptor Pavel Sokolov (1764–1835) on the pleasure ground at the palace of Tsarskoye Selo. The sculpture refers to the fable about the milkmaid and her pail by Jean de La Fontaine. Today's copy was created in the Soviet Union in 1987. The Boy's Fountain is located in the middle of the pleasure ground. At its place was at first a sentimental memorial fountain called the “Monument“. Only after 1851 it was rebuilt into today's Boy's Fountain. It was inspired by a fountain design draft by Friedrich August Stüler published in 1850 on which the (destroyed) Frog's Fountain in Sanssouci was modelled. For the Frog's Fountain Friedrich Wilhelm Dankberg (de) created a statue of a boy carrying a bowl from which Prince Charles commissioned a zinc copy. On Lenné hill half hidden at bushes a „remnants of columns arrangement” is placed. The arrangement includes two column sections of the ancient Greek temple of Poseidon at Cape Sounion, a capital from the Pantheon in Rome and another one from the St. Paul's outside the Walls basilica in Rome.

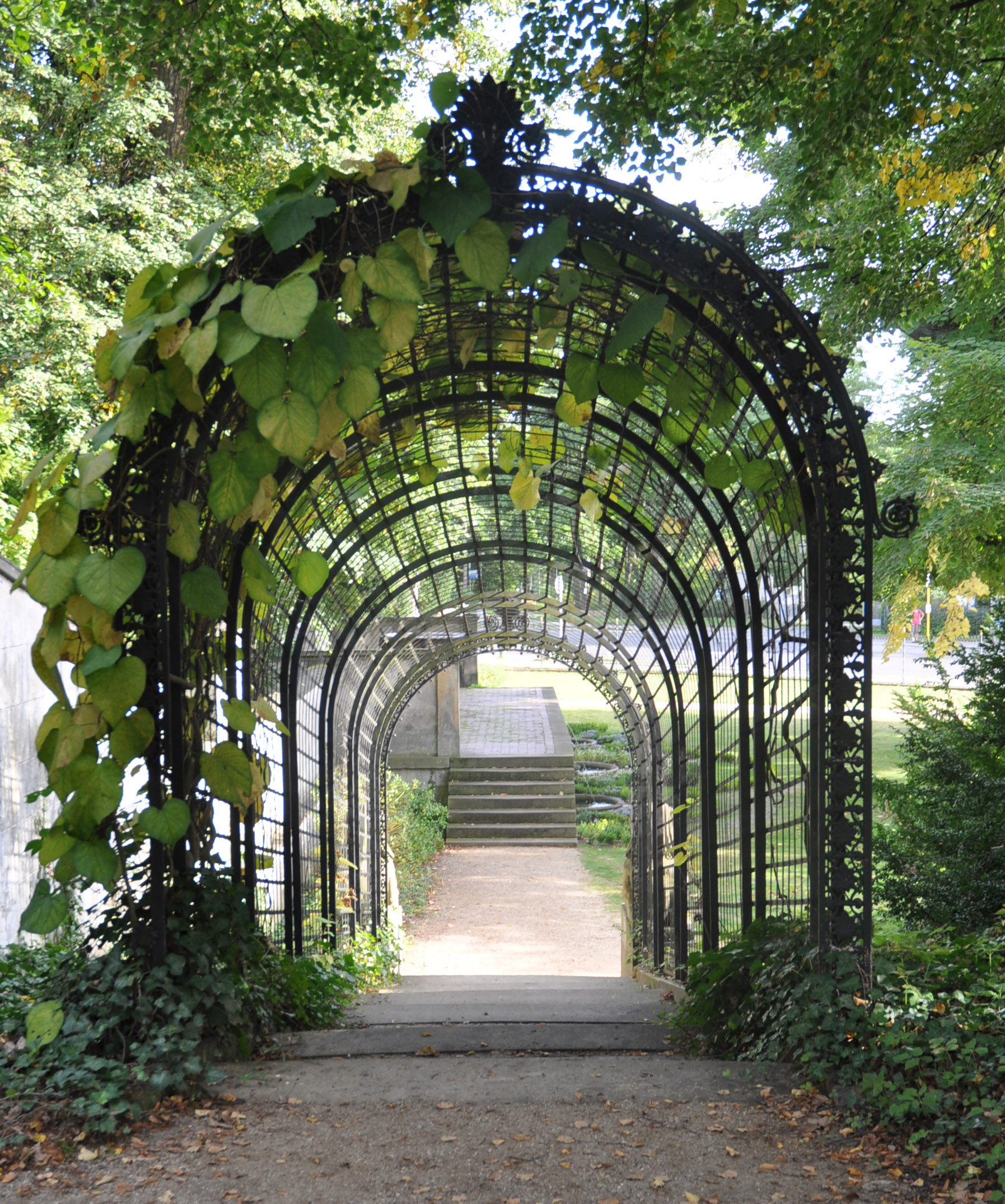
“Sphinx” flight of steps with trellis covered by pipevine

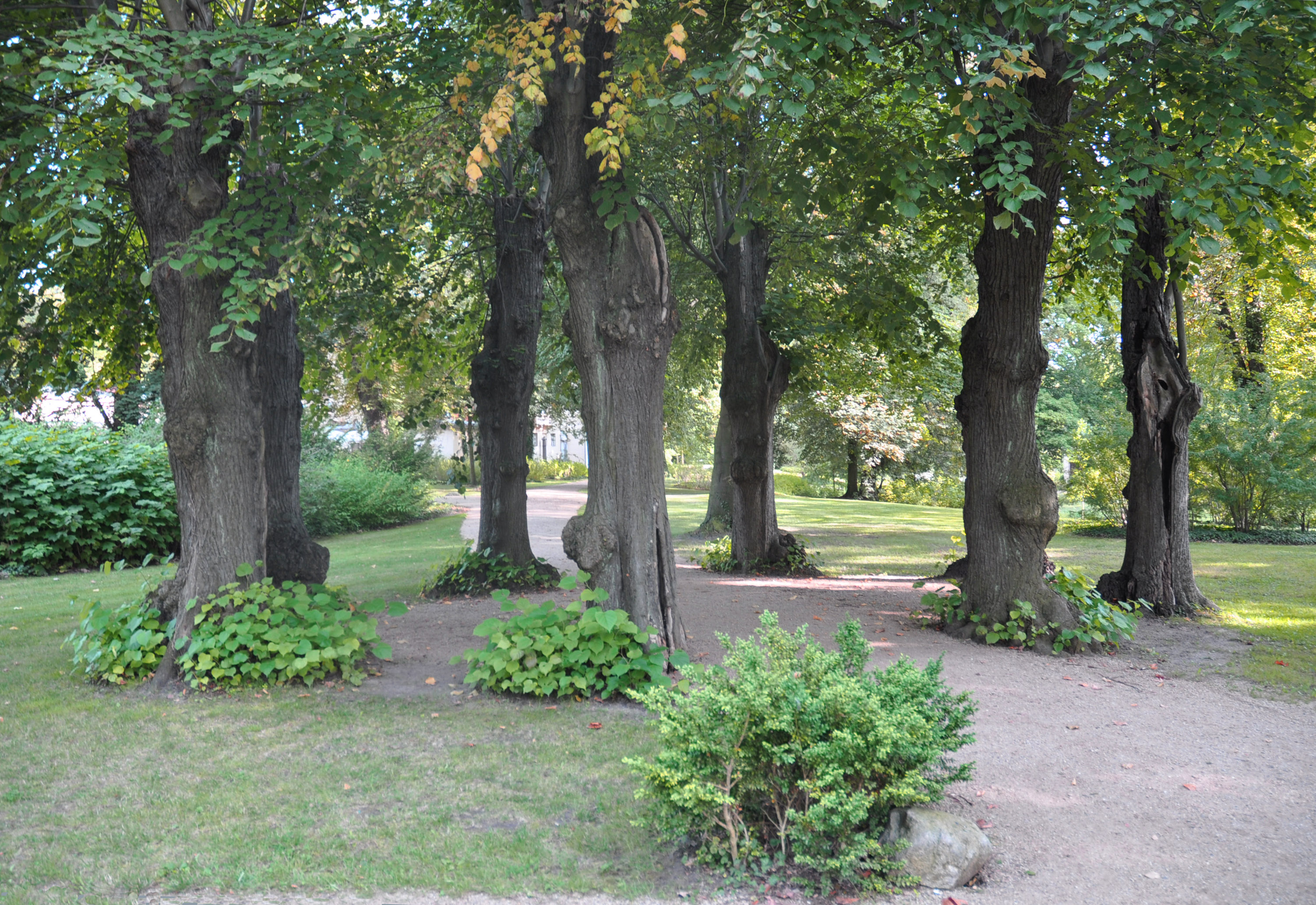
Lime Trees Pergola in late summer 2012

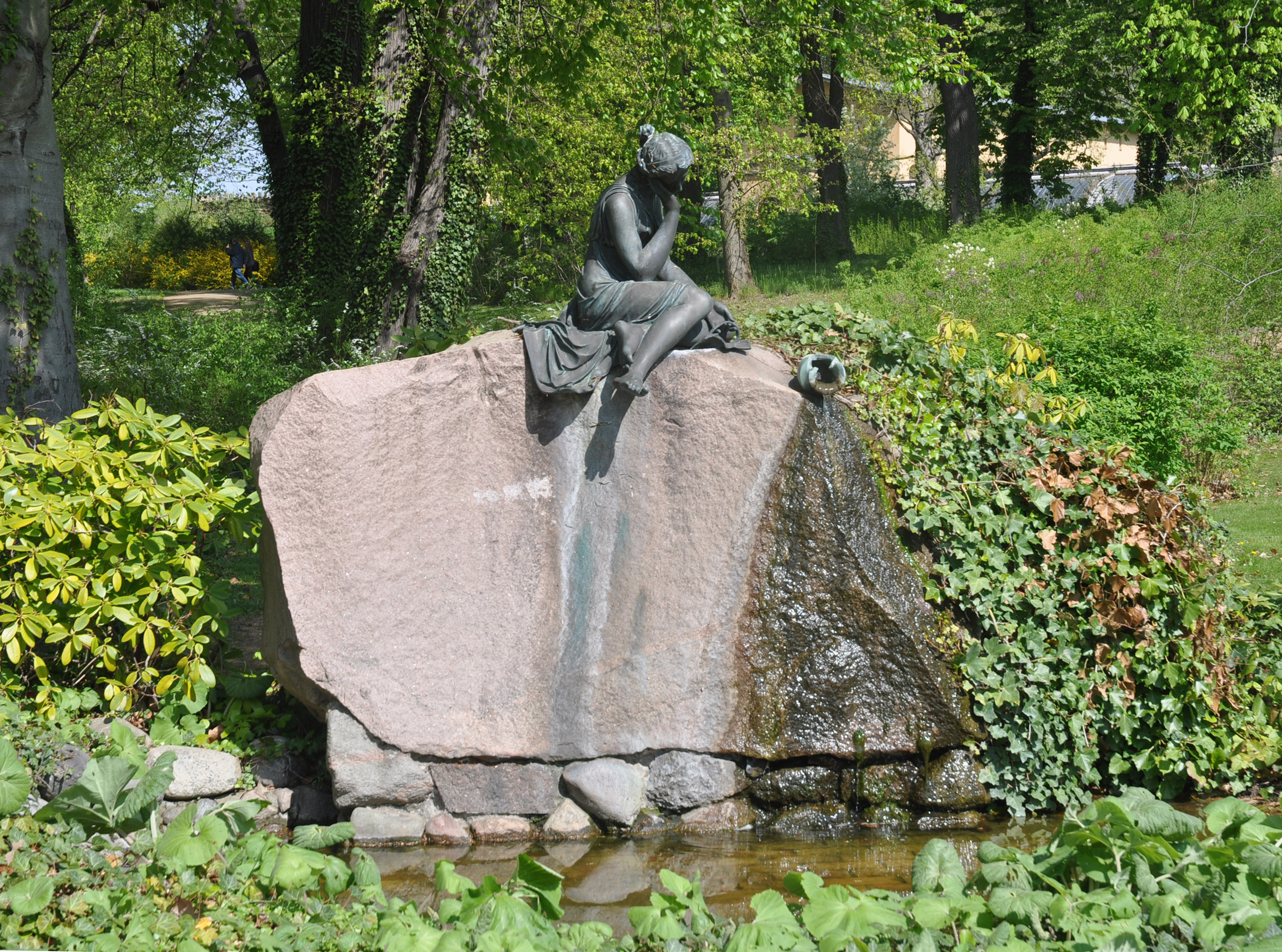
“La Laitière“ Fountain

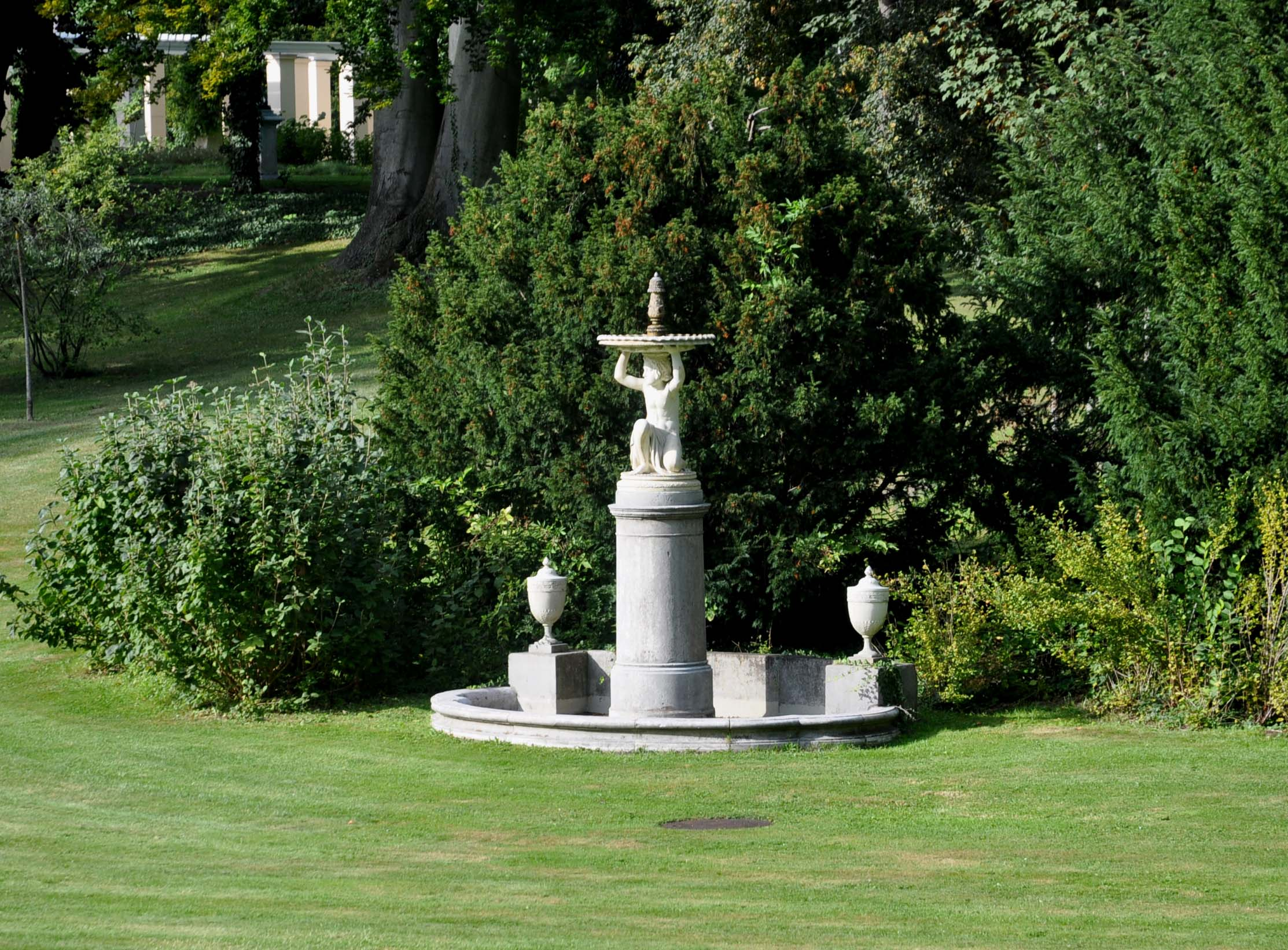
Boy's Fountain

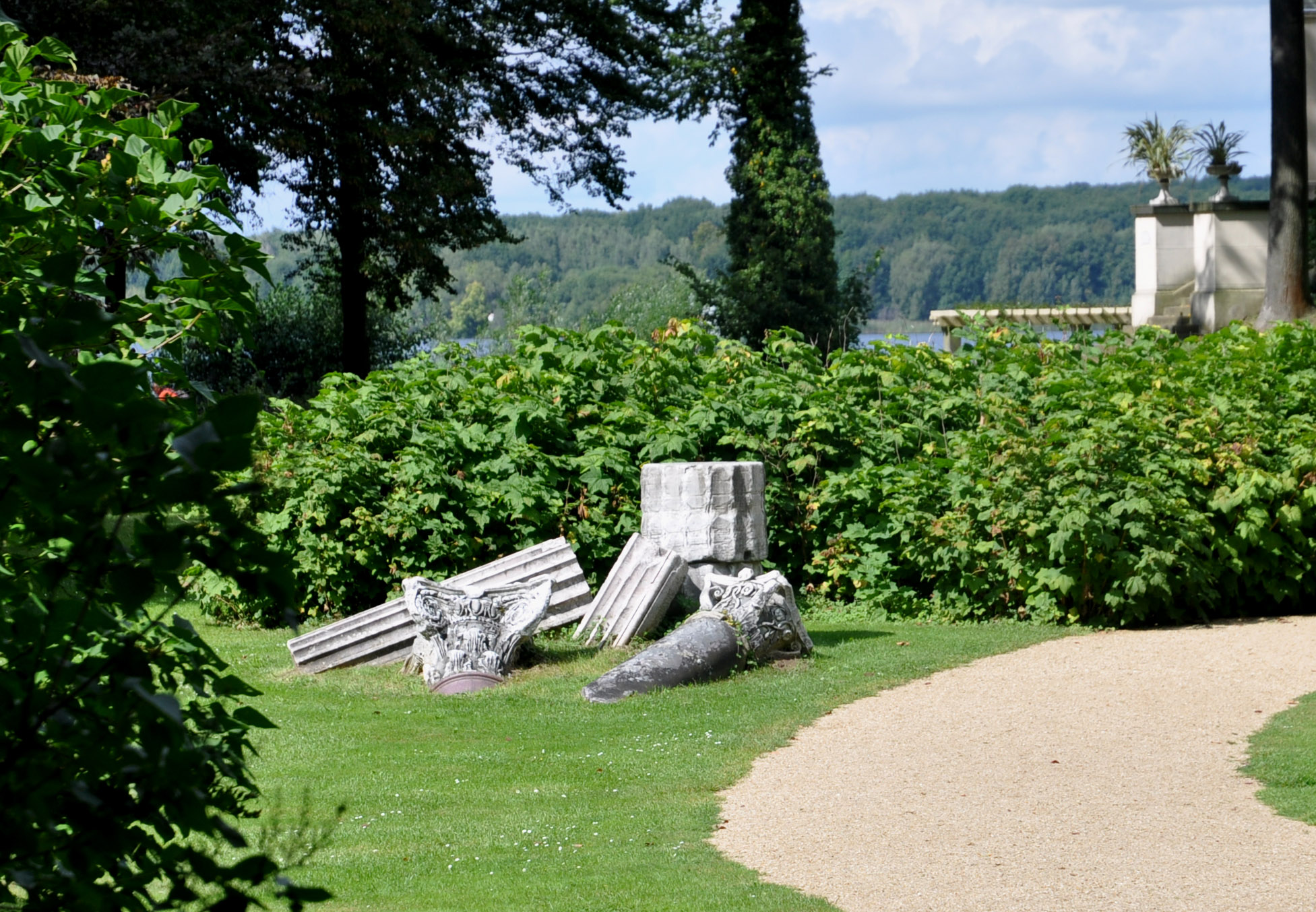
Remnants of columns arrangement

== Outlying Park areas ==
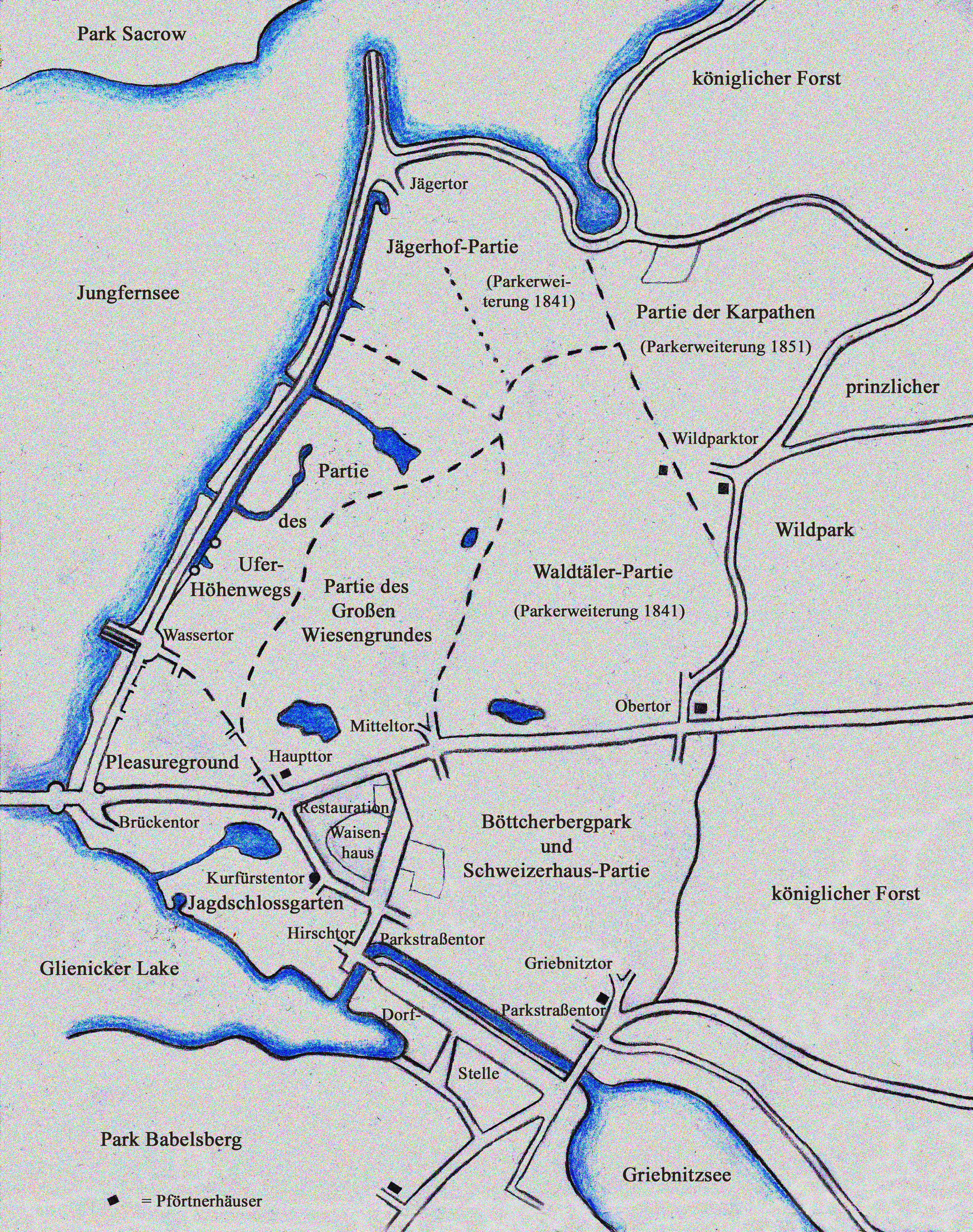
Modern overview of parts of Park Glienicke since last extensions

The outlying park areas were separated from the pleasure ground by walls, fences or so-called invisible fences thus keeping out livestock and wildlife which roamed in the outlying park. In the middle of today's park lies the part of the Big Meadows(Großer Wiesengrund). In the west of it the part of the Shore Ridge Path(Ufer-Höhenweg) is located which is continued to the north by the part of the Hunter's Court (Jägerhof). In the northeast the part of the Karpathen is a mountain park with steep slopes. South of it and east of the Big Meadows stretches a part which is dominated by Wooded Valleys(Waldtäler-Partie). South of the Berlin-Potsdam chaussee are the Böttcherberg-Park with its Swiss chalets area and the adjacent Hunting Lodge Garden(Jagdschlossgarten). The east of the Hunter's Court and the wooded valleys became part of the park when Frederick William, who became King of Prussia in June 1840, gave the area on the basis of a kind of perpetual usufruct to his brother Charles as a Christmas present in 1840. The Böttcherberg-Park belonged already to the Lindenau estate since 1804, yet the main landscape design effort started only in 1841. The largest part of the Karpathen was bought in 1851. Charles’ work on the plans for the Hunting Lodge Garden started about the time when his brother, the King, suffered several strokes in summer 1857. The Swiss chalets in Böttcherberg-Park were built from 1863 to 1867. after the owner of the adjacent Babelsberg Park, Charles’ brother William, the Prince regent, became King in 1861. Some of the names of the parts are historical. Big Meadows, Shore Ridge Path, the part of the Hunter's Court and the part of the Wooded Valleys are auxiliary names as the traditional names by Charles and his family are not known.

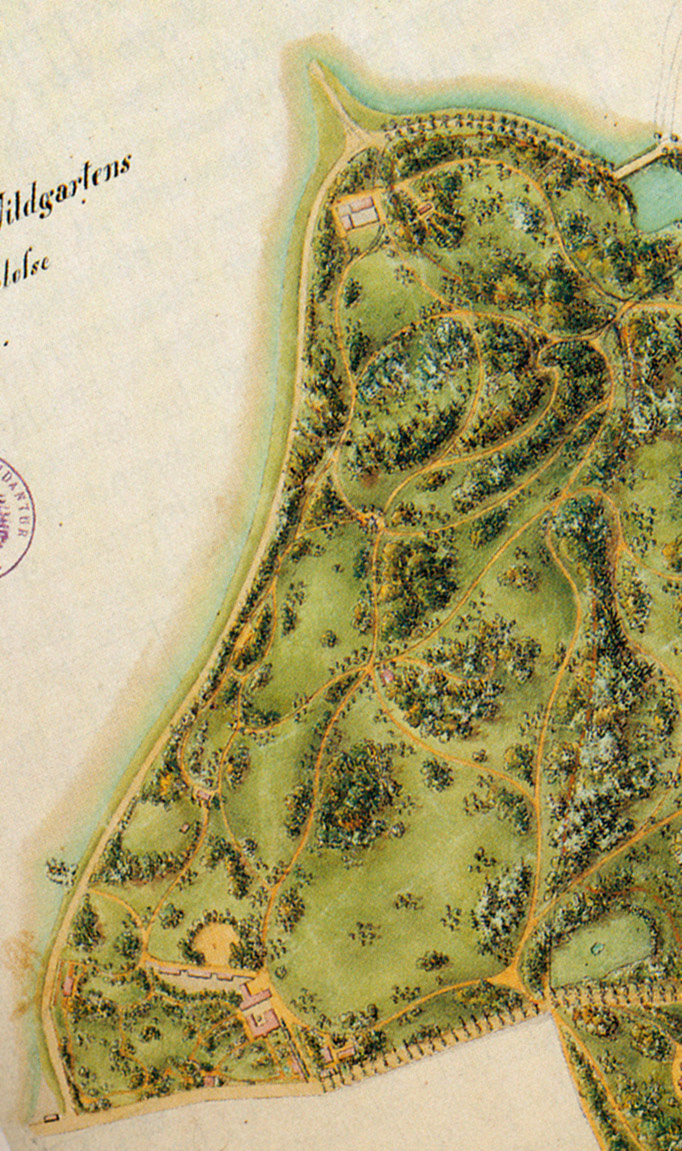
Map of Park Glienicke, Detail without park extensions (P. J. Lenné, 1831)

Lenné's park design is characterized by very many and seemingly surprising sightlines in the park itself as well as in the Potsdam cultural ensemble. The continuous interlocking of meadows creating the highest degree of views is also typical for Lenné. Figurative flower beds, lively structured ponds and mountainous designed park parts are typical for landscape gardening by Prince Pückler. In Glienicke Prince Charles united both approaches, yet the western parts of the park show clearly the hand of Lenné. Regarding the park design Charles did not meet Pückler in person for decades, although they were introduced at the Congress of Aix-la-Chapelle in 1818. Yet it is remarkable that Charles used the presence of Pückler's employee Jacob Rehder (de) at Babelsberg to consult him about Pückler's approach to landscape design while Pückler travelled through the north of Africa and the Near East from 1834 to 1840. Around 1837/38 Charles deviated from Lenné's design principles when he designed three ”gorges” in the part of the Shore Ridge Path and started to subdivide Lenné's unified designed park into parts. Pückler started the first of his eight visits to Prince Charles in Glienicke only in 1853, the same year the court gardener Friedrich Schojan, who had already served Hardenberg, retired. Schojan was succeeded by August Gieseler who previously worked at Muskau Park.

1824 was a busy year for Charles in Glienicke. Besides the architectural work with Schinkel and Persius he worked with Lenné and Schojan regarding the park design and ordered as much coppice as possible for planting in autumn and spring. For the first phase the planting of around 26,000 copses was recorded, mostly oaks, poplars, locust trees and lilac trees. The huge number of copses resulted in a big logistical effort. On the park terrain of that time planting on a massive scale of between 40,000 and 50.000 copses happened during the first years. Despite consisting mostly of young beeches procurement did get difficult. As neighbouring tree nurseries and forests ran fast out of copses sourcing took Lenné, who was in charge, to more distant regions, especially the state forest Lüdersdorf in the Uckermark. At more exposed places in the park up to 40-years old trees were planted at huge costs during the following years.

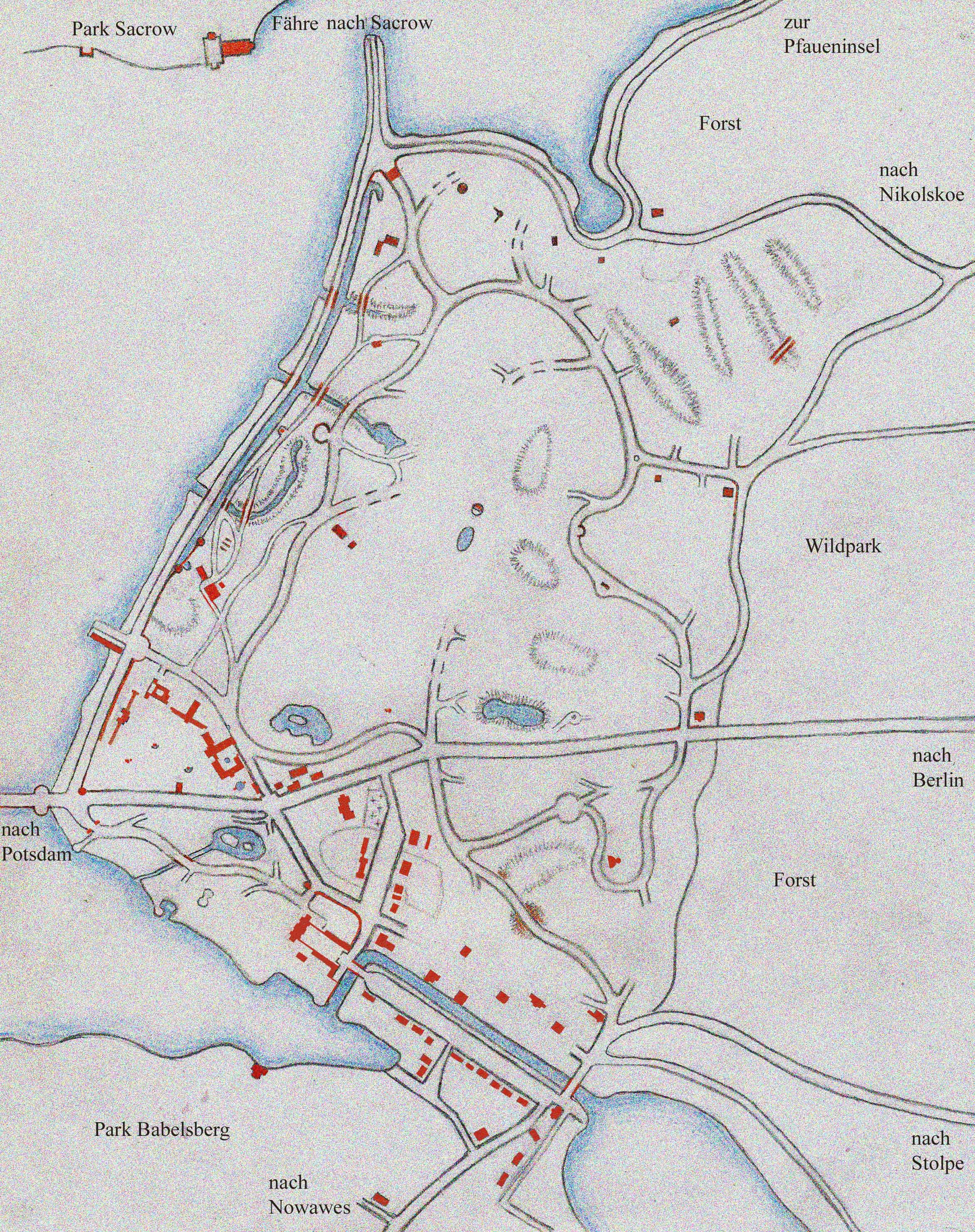
Sketch of Drive and park road network

Through a network of park roads and footpaths most of the park was accessible. Pure footpaths were to be found in difficult terrain. At very steep slopes footpaths with steps were available which were lost when most of the park became “Volkspark”. One path with steps was across the Karpathen, another one linked the main park road, the Drive, with the Big Hunting Parasol. There were also paths with steps to reach the lower parts of the Alders Bridge in the part of the Shore Ridge Path.

Touring Park Glienicke by coach was done on the Drive, the main park road, which began at the Middle Gate, nowadays an inconspicuous flight of stairs at the Berlin-Potsdam chaussee(Königstraße). When the chaussee was expanded to become Reichsstraße 1 the street level was raised at the park. Middle Gate was not anymore at the level of the Big Meadows requiring a flight of stairs. To access the “Volkspark” a monumental limestone flight of stairs was probably built in 1935 which was replaced by a more modest construction after 1945. In the 19th century visitors drove through Middle Gate, then past the big erratic with the date 1 May 1824(date of purchase of estate by Prince Charles) and along Big Meadows where the Palace Pond and the Workers’ Quarters were on sight to finally reach the open part of the Garden Courtyard where they entered the Palace. From the Palace the Drive, allowing a view of Coach House Courtyard, went north along Shore Ridge with the Tent as highest vantage point. Close to Hunter's Court after a rather sharp bend the park road went south to the Big Meadows during the first years. Only at the end of the 1830s the completion of the three “gorges” with the pertinent bridges on Shore Ridge and buildings like the Court Gardener's House with the adjacent water tower of the pumping station increased significantly the number of sights inside the park along the sightlines from the Drive. With the park extensions after 1840 the Drive was also extended to include the new parts in the north and the east. Several times the curve in the north was redesigned to a larger radius enabling a new route in the north which offered e.g. a splendid view of Peacock Island from the Drive. In its design the main park road became more dramatic in the east. From a dam leading southeastward views were possible into “gorges” adorned with erratics. Passing the Hermitage the Drive descended into the wooded parts from where in a big westward curve it ascended to the edge of a steep slope which was impressive regarding the usual regional topography. From vantage points there magnificent long-distance views on the Potsdam cultural ensemble were possible. At the Upper Gate the Berlin-Potsdam chaussee was crossed and the tour continued into Böttcherberg-Park. Following another steep ascent the Alexandra Bench offered a view into the gorge there. At the Rondell the tour would usually be continued to the adjacent Babelsberg Park. On a shorter tour the coach would drive from the Rondell via the Middle Gate back to the Palace.

The park roads were built in layers. Coarse material was covered with fine material. The camber ensured that rain ran fast off the surface. At slopes the park roads had narrow and flat gutters which were flanked by pebbles of erratics preventing erosion. At intersections the gutters crossed the road.

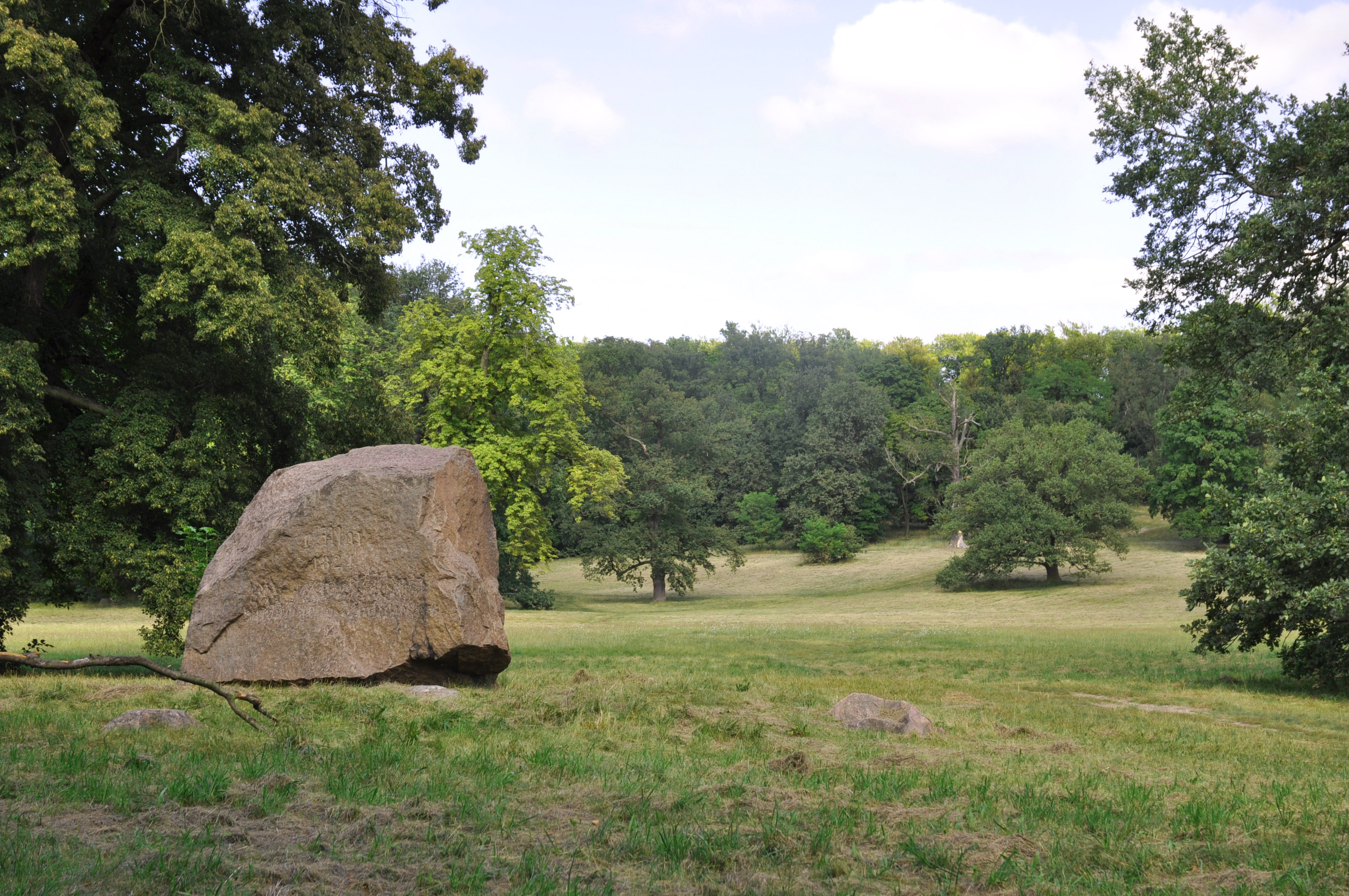
Erratic with purchase date at Big Meadows

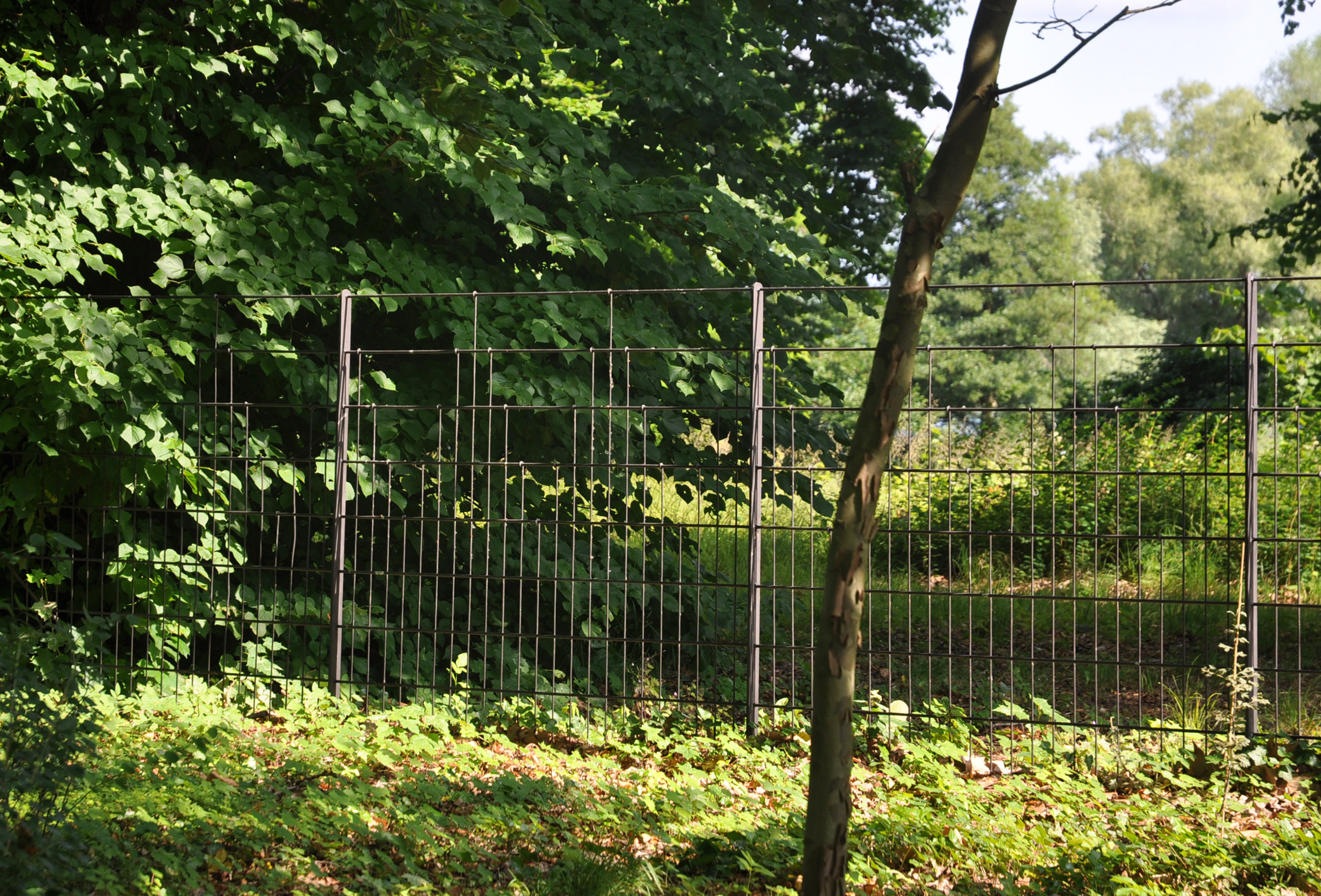
Invisible fence between Casino and Cloister Courtyard

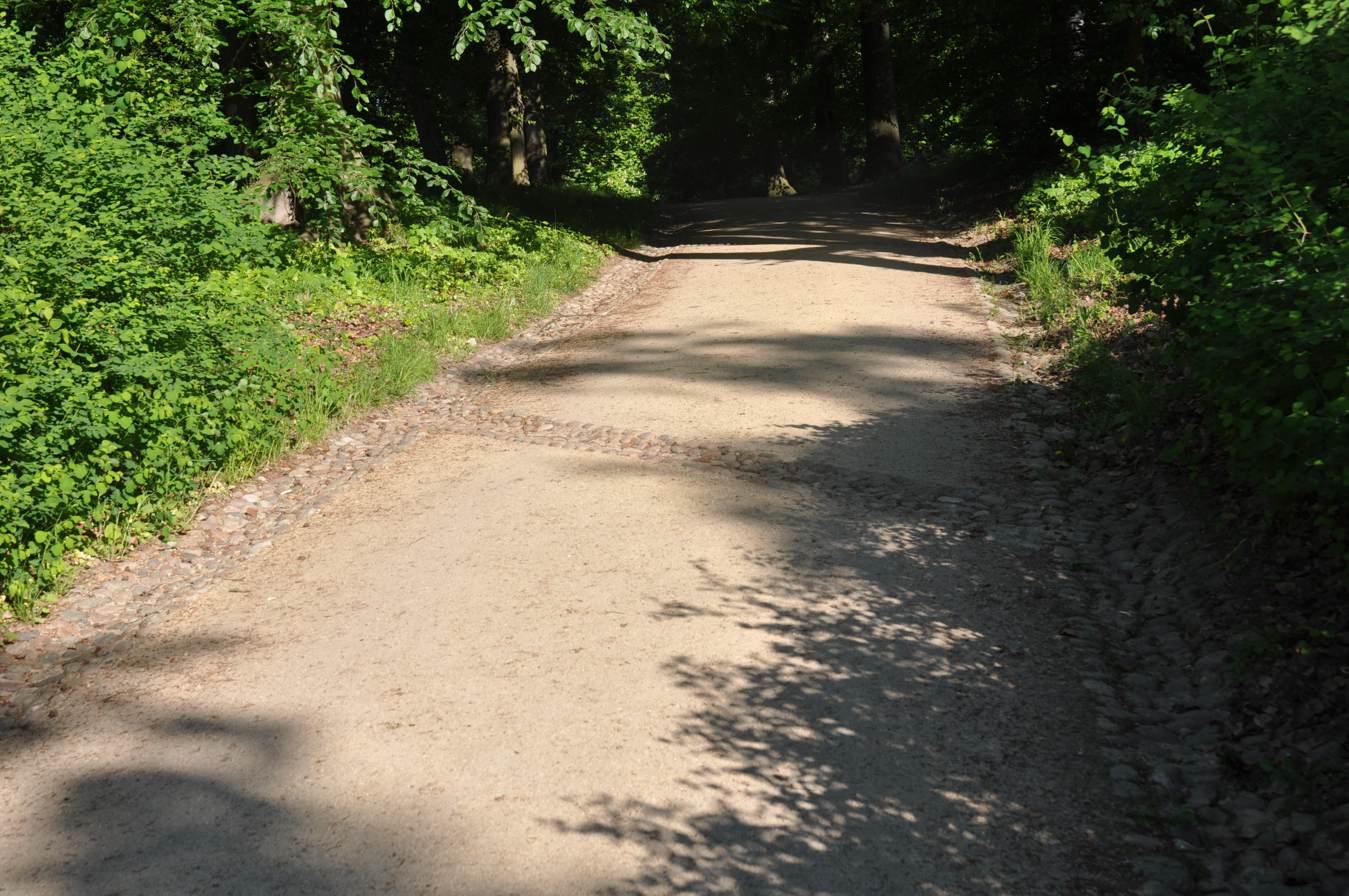
Restored historic park road

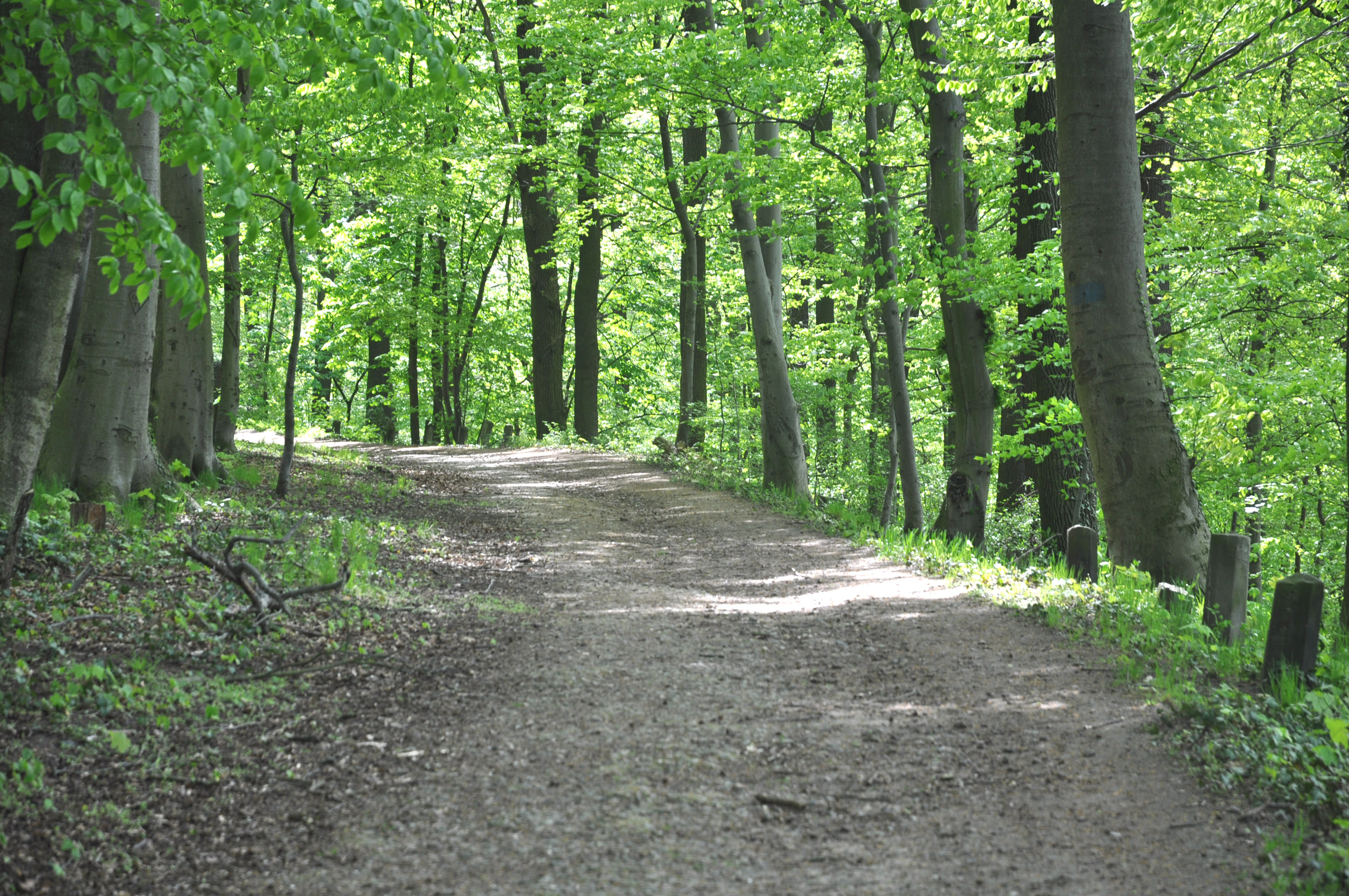
Drive at edge of slope in Böttcherberg-Park

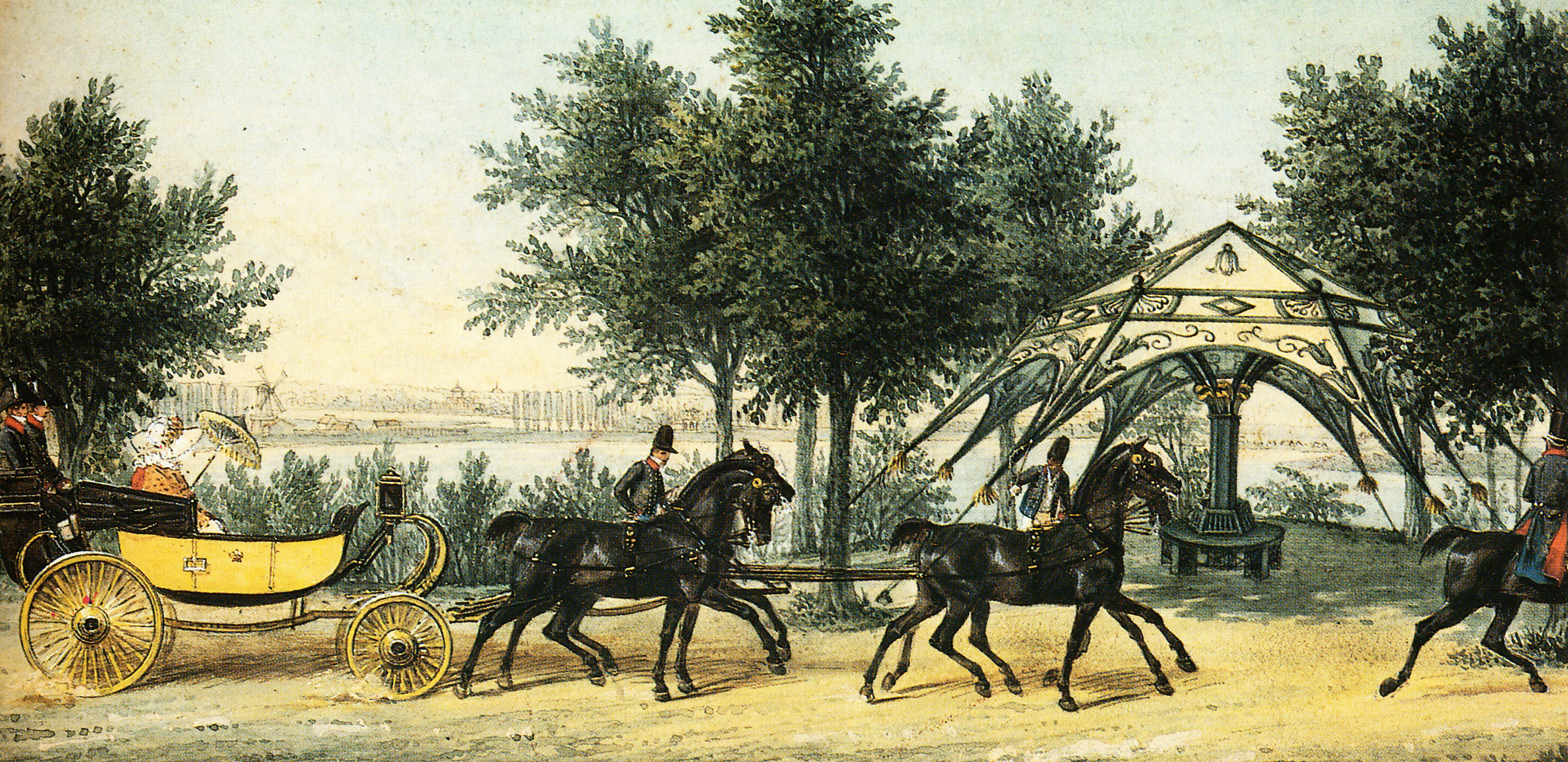
Touring the park: Princess Marie in a coach at the Tent (Franz Krüger, around 1840)

== See also ==
- Palaces and Parks of Potsdam and Berlin
