= Julius Lange =

Julius Lange may refer to:

- Julius Lange (painter) (1817–1878), German landscape painter
- Julius Lange (art historian) (1838–1896), Danish art historian
- Julius Lange (numismatist) (1815–1905), German numismatist

== See also ==
- Lange (surname)
