= Peace Project =

Peace Project may refer to:

- Generally, projects intended to bring about peace
- The Peace Project, a non-profit organization
- "The Peace Project", an album by Hillsong Worship
- Everest Peace Project, a peace-through-mountaineering organization
- Zimbabwe Peace Project, a human-rights-monitoring organization
- Peace Crane Project, involving origami
- Mostar Friedensprojekt
