= Assault of Ermyas Mulugeta =

2006 assault in Potsdam, Germany

The assault of Ermyas Mulugeta happened late on Easter Sunday, 16 April 2006, at a tram stop in Potsdam, Germany. Two men beat him so badly he was put into a coma for two weeks, and since there appeared to be a racial motive to the attack, the case was taken up by the Public Prosecutor General. The assault had occurred amidst preparations for Germany to host the 2006 FIFA World Cup and therefore received international attention, which focused on right-wing extremism. Two men were arrested, charged with racially motivated attempted murder and then had their charges dropped following a trial in June 2007. In 2007, Mulugeta set up a foundation called Löwenherz (Lionheart) to teach schoolchildren about diversity.

== Assault ==
Ermyas Mulugeta was born c. 1969 in Ethiopia. He travelled to East Germany in 1988 on a scholarship and trained as an engineer, working from 2001 onwards at the Institute for Agricultural Engineering in Bornim, a suburb of Potsdam. He became a German citizen and got married, having two children. Mulugeta was involved in an incident at a tram stop in Potsdam late on the evening of Easter Sunday, 16 April 2006. He was beaten up so badly he ended up in an artificially-induced coma for two weeks with a fractured skull. He was unable to remember what had happened, but he had called his wife at the time, and the answerphone message recorded racist abuse, so the incident was investigated as a hate crime.

The next day, residents demonstrated in Potsdam against xenophobia, and there was a general outpouring of sympathy for Mulugeta. The attack then received national coverage in the media, and indicating how seriously the case was being taken, the Public Prosecutor General Kay Nehm took over the investigation. Some days later, two men were arrested, and it was alleged that they had hit Mulugeta with a bottle, knocked him to the ground and kicked him repeatedly. One of the men had links to far-right movements, and they were both charged with racially motivated attempted murder. They were flown by helicopter to the Federal Prosecutor's Office in Karlsruhe and appeared at the Federal Court of Justice.

The apparent racist motivation for the attack caused national controversy, and German Chancellor Angela Merkel said it was an "abscheuliche Verbrechen" (heinous crime). In contrast, Federal Interior Minister Wolfgang Schäuble was condemned for saying that "there are also blond, blue-eyed victims of violent crime" (although he later backtracked), and the Brandenburg Interior Minister Jörg Schönbohm said, "this could have happened in New York, Paris or London". Schönbohm also criticised Nehm for taking on the investigation and creating a media spectacle by flying the suspects by helicopter to Karlsruhe. The Central Council of Jews in Germany responded to Schönbohm's comments by suggesting that "he desperately needs some private tutoring".

== Trial and aftermath ==
The trial began on 7 February 2007 at Potsdam Regional Court. While giving evidence, Mulugeta spoke slowly and had gaps in his memory. It was suggested that, like the two men, Mulugeta had also been drunk and that he had been the one who had started the confrontation. Mulugeta had called the two attackers "pigs". The charges against the two men were then dropped for lack of evidence on 15 June 2007; the lead judge stated, "this is a classic case of the principle: when in doubt, give the accused the benefit of the doubt". The men were then re-arrested and charged again, only to be released a second time.

The assault took place amidst preparations for Germany to host the 2006 FIFA World Cup and, therefore, received international attention, which focused on right-wing extremism. The Federal Office for the Protection of the Constitution (the domestic intelligence agency) confirmed that there had been an increase in reported far-right-related incidents from 12,000 in 2004 up to 15,000 in 2005. The Africa Council Organization then released a guide to no-go areas in Germany, citing concerns for the safety of football fans travelling from countries such as Angola, Côte d'Ivoire, Ghana, Togo and Tunisia. Magdeburg police denied there were no-go areas in Germany.

In 2007, Mulugeta set up a foundation called Löwenherz (Lionheart) to teach schoolchildren about diversity. He then completed a PhD at the University of Rostock on the theme of optimization of the washing procedure for vegetables and potatoes (Optimierung des Waschprozesses für Gemüse und Speisekartoffeln). Mulugeta stood for office in 2019 on behalf of the Pirate Party Germany in the district of Potsdam-Mittelmark; he also stood in local council elections in Borkheide.
