= Potsdam =

Capital of Brandenburg, Germany

- City
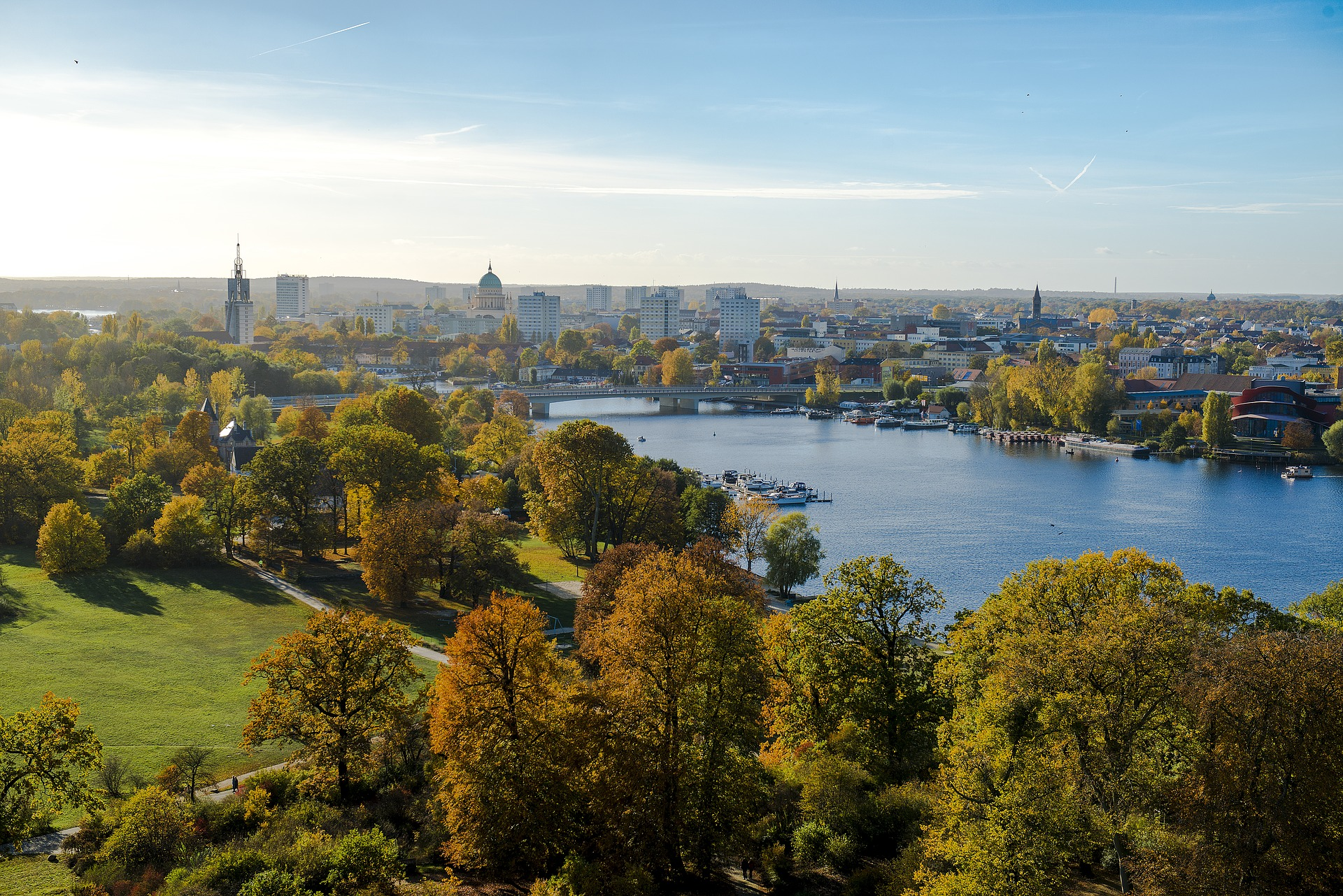
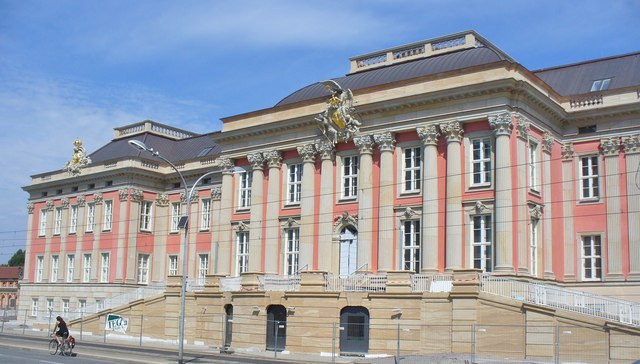
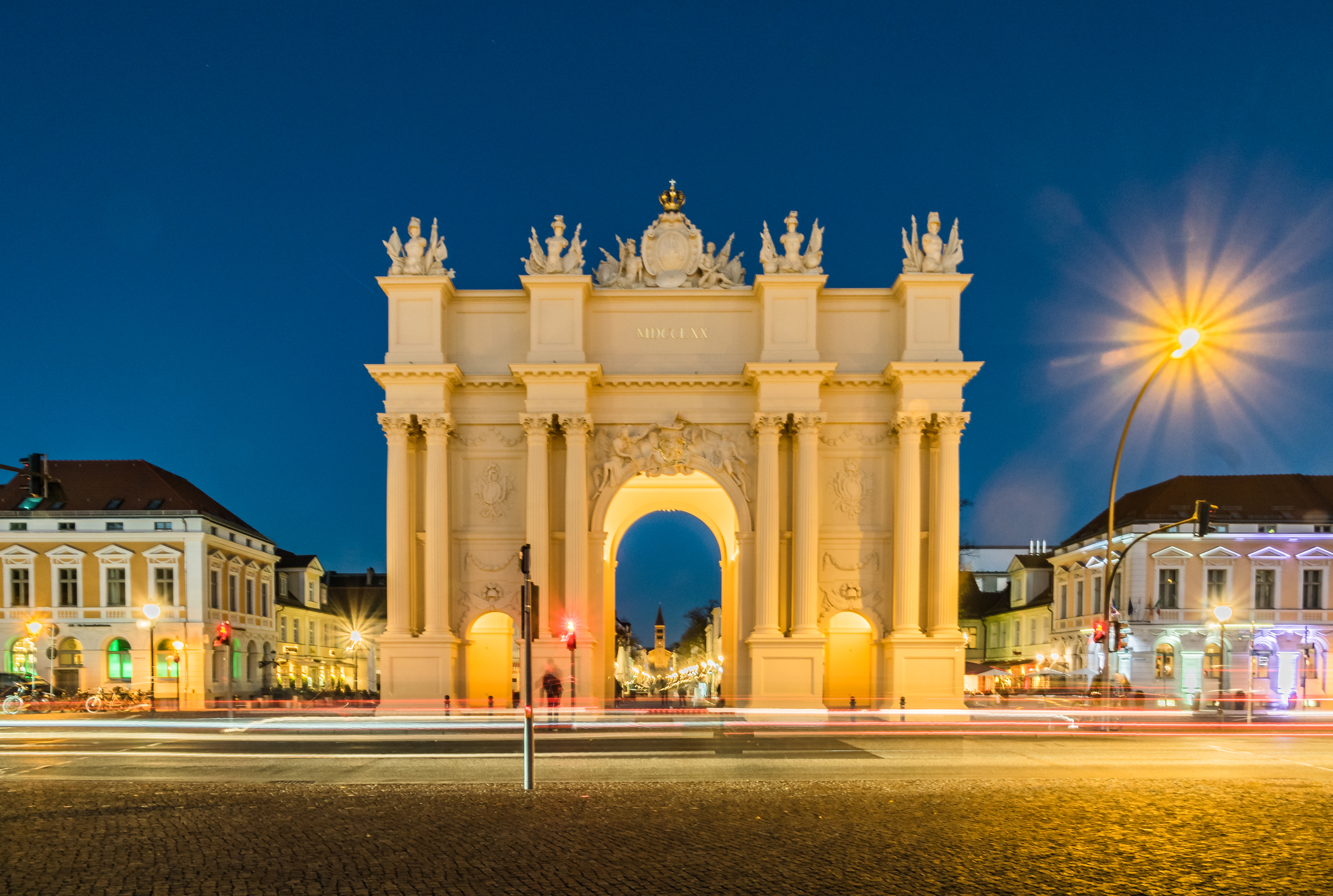
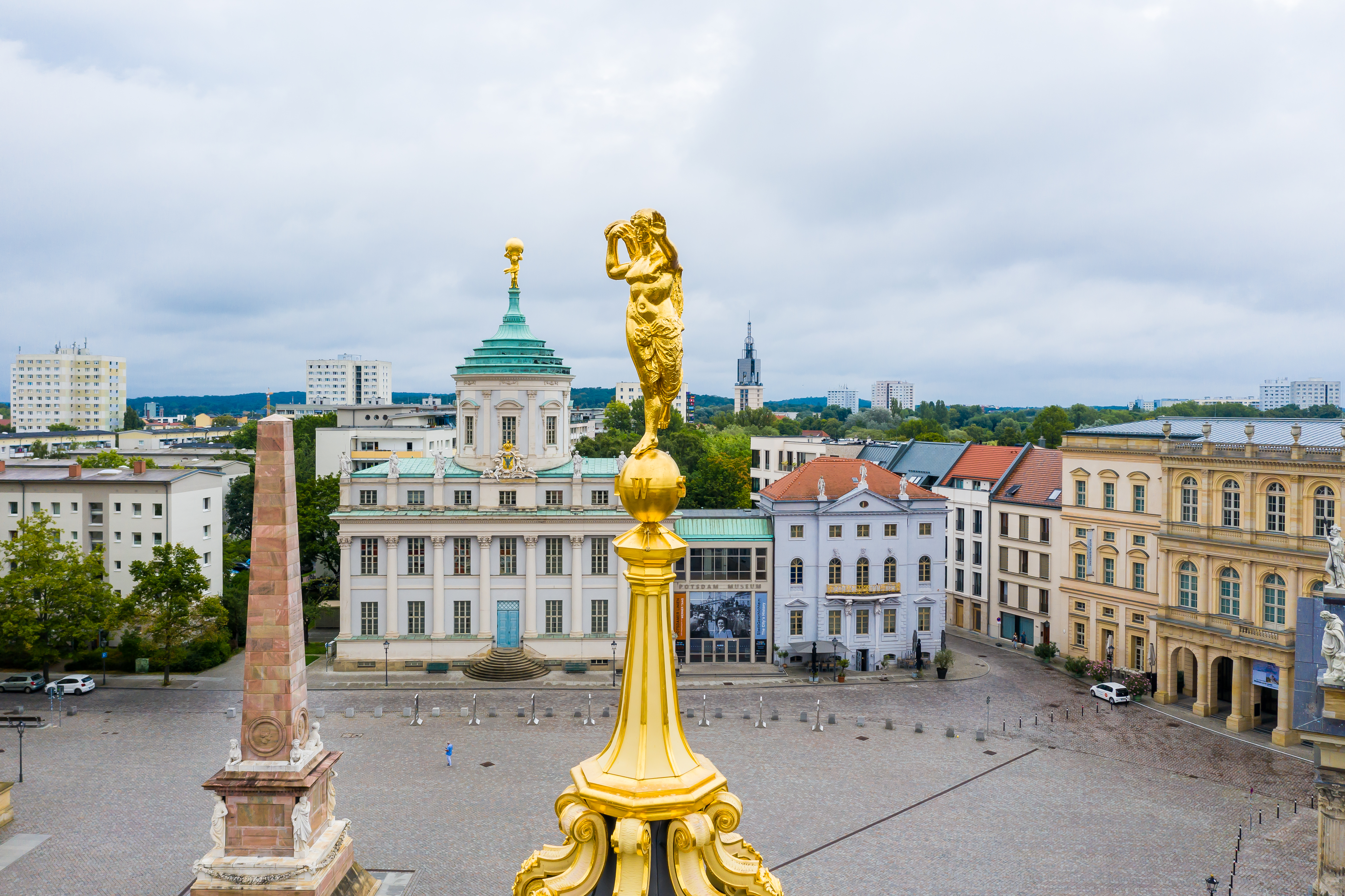
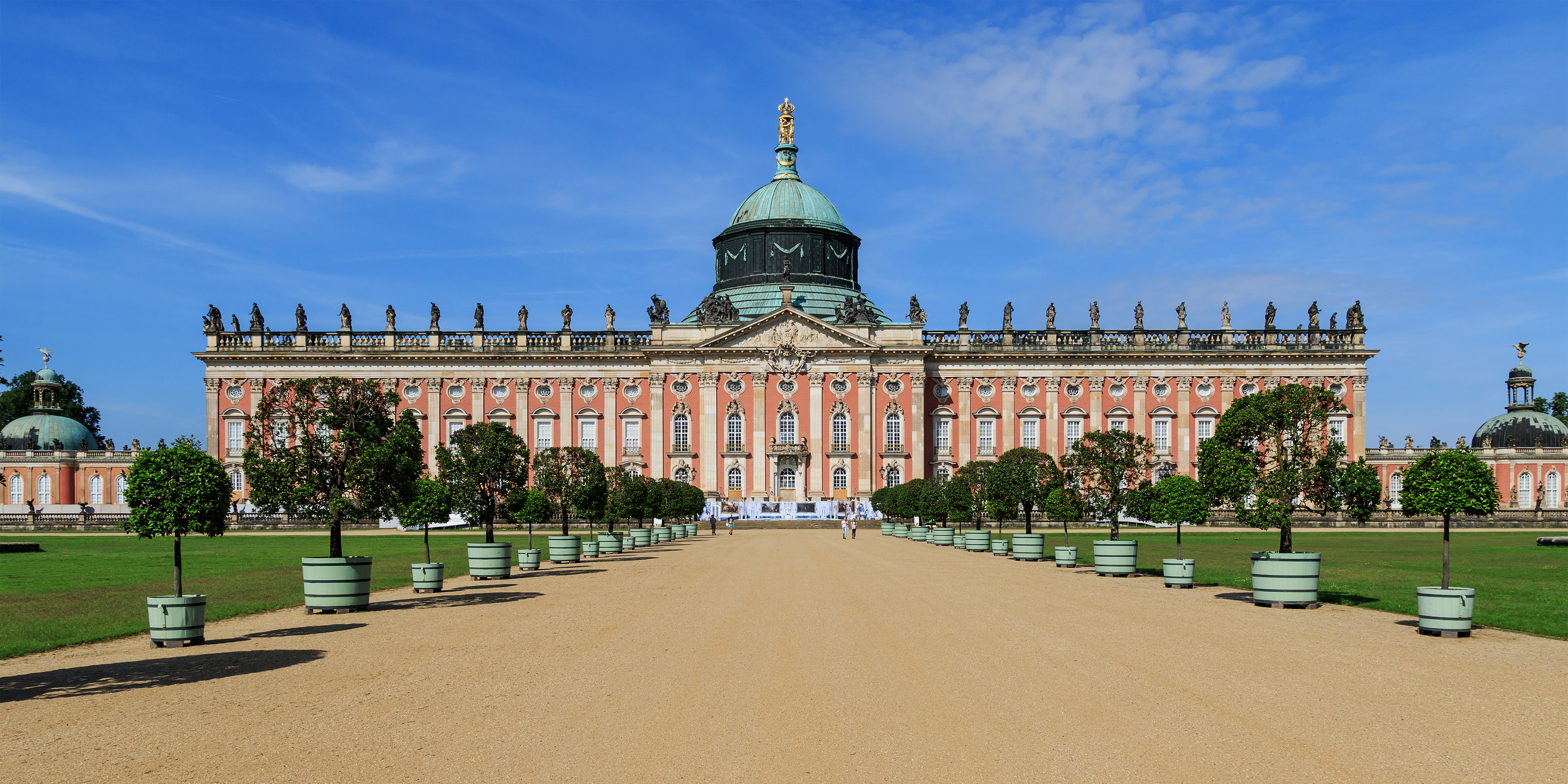
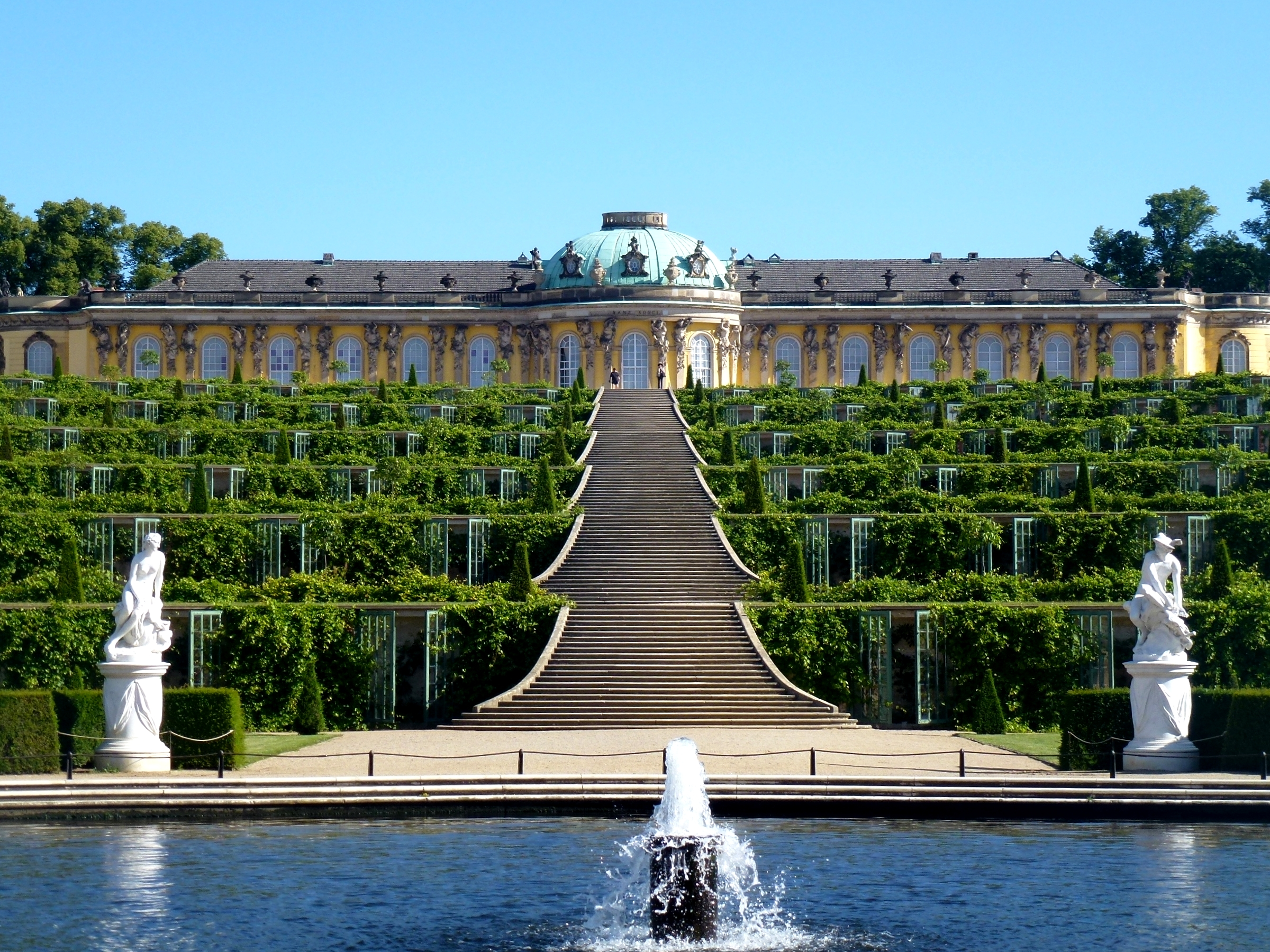
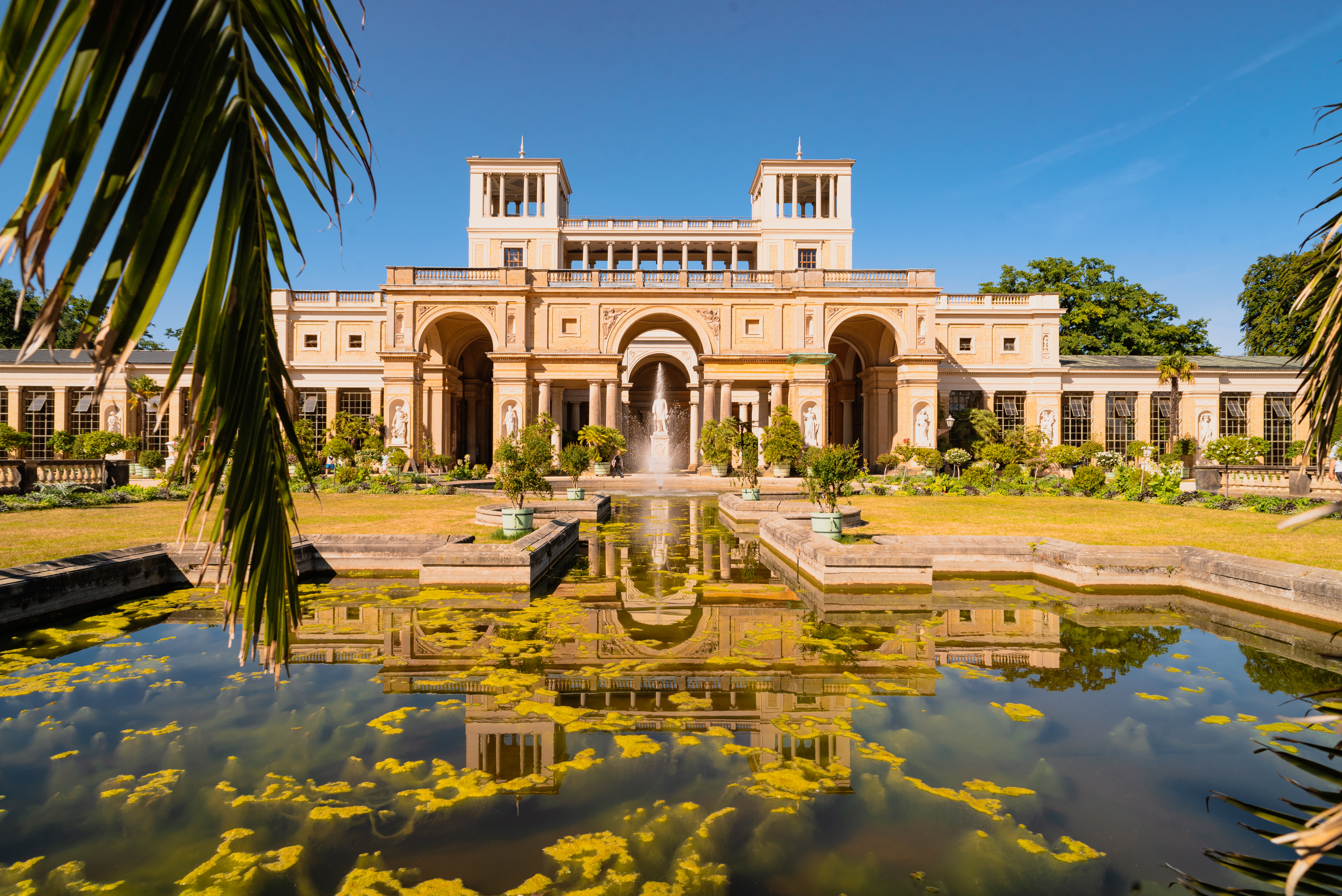
- View over Potsdam with Babelsberg Park City Palace Brandenburg Gate Old City Hall New Palace Sanssouci Orangery Palace

- Flag Coat of arms
- Interactive map of Potsdam
- Location within Germany Location within Brandenburg
- Coordinates: 52°24′02″N 13°03′33″E
- Country: Germany
- State: Brandenburg
- District: Urban district
- Founded: 1776

Government
  - Mayor (2025–33): Noosha Aubel (Ind.)

Area
  - Total: 187.28 km^{2} (72.31 sq mi)
- Elevation: 32 m (105 ft)

Population (2025-12-31)
  - Total: 185,137
  - Density: 988.56/km^{2} (2,560.4/sq mi)
- Time zone: UTC+01:00 (CET)
  - Summer (DST): UTC+02:00 (CEST)
- Postal codes: 14467–14482
- Dialling codes: 0331
- Vehicle registration: P
- Website: en.potsdam.de

Potsdam (Note: /ˈpɒtsdæm/ POTS-dam; German: [ˈpɔtsdam]) is the capital and largest city of the German state of Brandenburg. It is part of the Berlin/Brandenburg Metropolitan Region. Potsdam sits on the River Havel, a tributary of the Elbe, downstream of Berlin, and lies embedded in a hilly morainic landscape dotted with many lakes, around 20 of which are located within Potsdam's city limits. It lies some 25 kilometres (16 miles) southwest of Berlin's city centre. The name of the city and of many of its boroughs are of Slavic origin.

Potsdam was a residence of the Prussian kings and the German Emperor until 1918. Its planning embodied ideas of the Age of Enlightenment: through a careful balance of architecture and landscape, Potsdam was intended as "a picturesque, pastoral dream" which would remind its residents of their relationship with nature and reason.

The city, which is over 1,000 years old, is widely known for its palaces, its lakes, and its overall historical and cultural significance. Landmarks include the parks and palaces of Sanssouci, Germany's largest World Heritage Site, as well as other palaces such as the Orangery Palace, the New Palace, Cecilienhof Palace, and Charlottenhof Palace. Potsdam was also the location of the significant Potsdam Conference in 1945, the conference where the three heads of government of the USSR, the US, and the UK decided on the division of Germany following its surrender, a conference which defined Germany's history for the following 45 years.

Babelsberg, in the south-eastern part of Potsdam, was already by the 1930s the home of a major film production studio and it has enjoyed success as an important centre of European film production since the fall of the Berlin Wall. The Filmstudio Babelsberg, founded in 1912, is the oldest large-scale film studio in the world. Potsdam was named a UNESCO City of Film in 2019, joining UNESCO's Creative Cities Network.

Potsdam developed into a centre of science in Germany in the 19th century. Today, there are three public colleges, the University of Potsdam, and more than 30 research institutes in the city.

== Geography ==
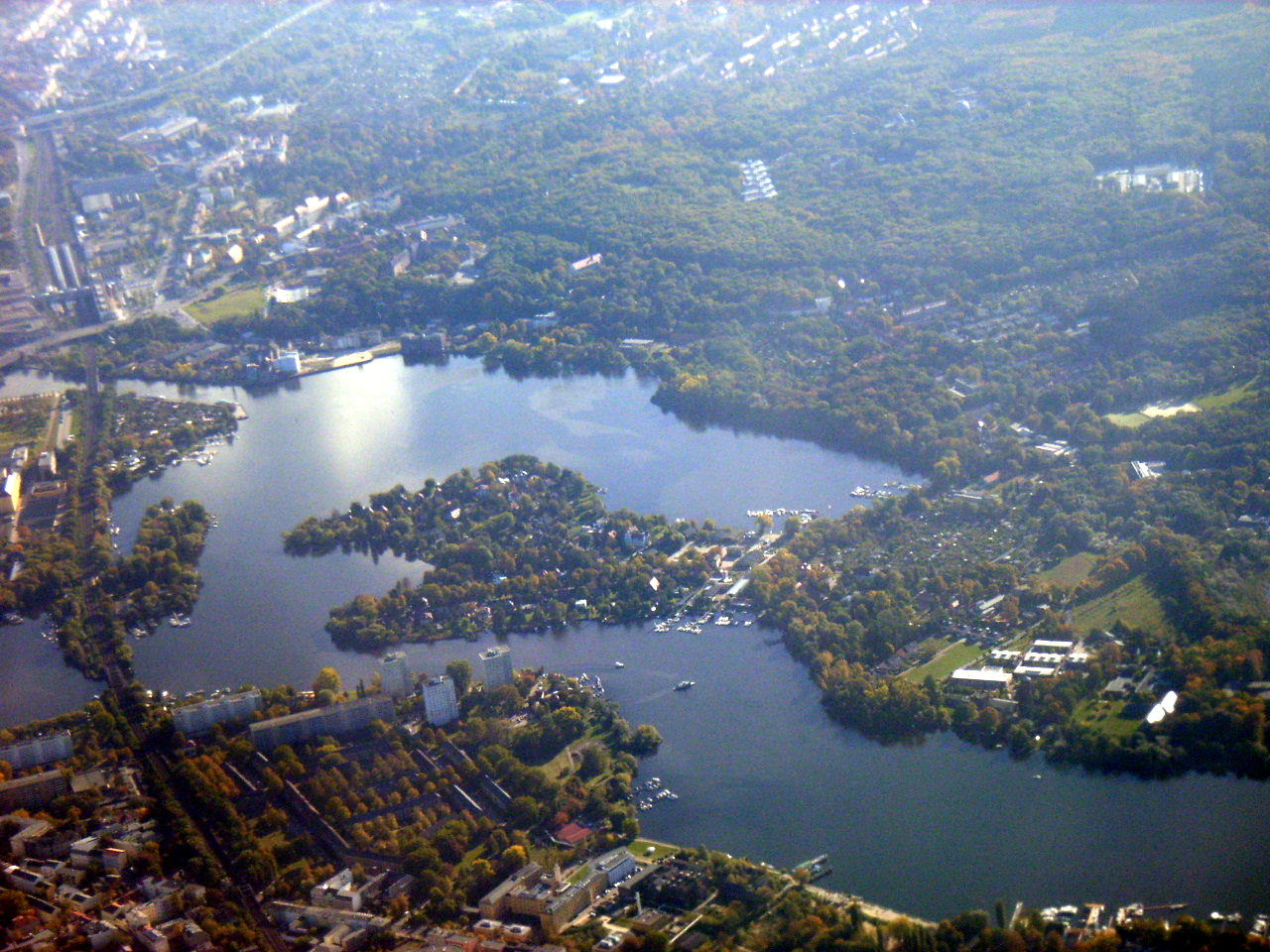
The Havel flowing through Potsdam with view of Hermannswerder

The area was formed from a series of large moraines left after the last glacial period. Today, only one quarter of the city is built up, the rest remaining as green space.

There are about 20 lakes and rivers in and around Potsdam, such as the Havel, the Griebnitzsee, Templiner See, Tiefer See, Jungfernsee, Teltowkanal, Heiliger See, and Sacrower See. The highest point is the 114-metre-high (374 ft) Kleiner Ravensberg.

=== Subdivisions ===
Potsdam is divided into seven historic city Stadtteile (quarters) and nine new Ortsteile (suburbs/wards, former separate villages), which joined the city in 2003. The appearance of the city boroughs is quite different. Those in the north and in the centre consist mainly of historical buildings, the south of the city is dominated by larger areas of newer buildings.

The city of Potsdam is divided into 32 Stadtteile (boroughs, both quarters and suburbs/wards together), which are divided further into 84 statistical Bezirke (districts).

Today, one distinguishes between the older parts of the city (areas of the historic city and places suburbanized at the latest in 1939) – these are the city center, the western and northern suburbs, Bornim, Bornstedt, Nedlitz, Potsdam South, Babelsberg, Drewitz, Stern and Kirchsteigfeld – and those communities incorporated after 1990 which have since 2003 become Ortsteile – these are Eiche, Fahrland, Golm, Groß Glienicke, Grube, Marquardt, Neu Fahrland, Satzkorn and Uetz-Paaren. The new Ortsteile are located mainly in the north of the city. For the history of all incorporations, see the relevant section on incorporation and spin-offs.

Structure with statistical numbering:

Stadtteile (boroughs) of Potsdam

- 1 Potsdam Nord
  - 11 Bornim
  - 12 Nedlitz
  - 13 Bornstedt
  - 14 Sacrow
  - 15 Eiche
  - 16 Grube
  - 17 Golm
- 2 Nördliche Vorstädte
  - 21 Nauener Vorstadt
  - 22 Jägervorstadt
  - 23 Berliner Vorstadt
- 3 Westliche Vorstädte
  - 31 Brandenburger Vorstadt
  - 32 Potsdam West
- 4 Innenstadt
  - 41 Historische Innenstadt
  - 43 Zentrum Ost und Nuthepark
  - 44 Hauptbahnhof und Brauhausberg Nord
- 5 Babelsberg
  - 51 Klein Glienicke
  - 52 Babelsberg Nord
  - 53 Babelsberg Süd
- 6 Potsdam Süd
  - 61 Templiner Vorstadt
  - 62 Teltower Vorstadt
  - 63 Schlaatz
  - 64 Waldstadt I und Industriegelände
  - 65 Waldstadt II
- 7 Potsdam Südost
  - 71 Stern
  - 72 Drewitz
  - 73 Kirchsteigfeld
- 8 Nördliche Ortsteile
  - 81 Uetz-Paaren
  - 82 Marquardt
  - 83 Satzkorn
  - 84 Fahrland
  - 85 Neu Fahrland
  - 86 Groß Glienicke

At the end of 2019, a change was made to the administrative structure:

- Borough 41 has been renamed: previously Nördliche Innenstadt, now Historische Innenstadt.
- Borough 42 (Südliche Innenstadt) has been divided into two boroughs, 43 (Zentrum Ost und Nuthepark) and 44 (Hauptbahnhof und Brauhausberg Nord). The number 42 was thus repealed.
- Some very sparsely populated urban boroughs have been disbanded:
  - Borough 33 (Wildpark) was incorporated into borough 32 (Potsdam-West).
  - Borough 66 (Industriegelände) was incorporated into borough 64 (formerly Waldstadt I). The borough was then renamed Waldstadt I und Industriegelände.
  - Borough 67 (Forst Potsdam Süd) was incorporated into borough 61 (Templiner Vorstadt).

=== Climate ===
Officially the climate is oceanic - more degraded by being far from the coast and to the east (Köppen: Cfb), but using the 1961–1990 normal and the 0 °C isotherm the city has a humid continental climate (Dfb), which also shows a slight influence of the continent different from the climates predominantly influenced by the Atlantic Ocean. Low averages below freezing for almost all winter causing snows that are frequent and winters are cold, but not as stringent as inland locations or with greater influence from the same. Summer is also relatively warm with temperatures between 23 and 24 °C, the heat waves being influenced by the UHI of Potsdam.

The average winter high temperature is 4.0 °C (39.2 °F), with a low of −1.3 °C (29.7 °F). Snow is common in the winter. Spring and autumn are short. Summers are mild, with a high of 24.3 °C (75.7 °F) and a low of 13.5 °C (56.3 °F).

The Potsdam weather station has recorded the following extreme values:

- Its highest temperature was 40.4 °C (104.7 °F) on 27 June 2026.
- Its lowest temperature was −26.8 °C (−16.2 °F) on 11 February 1929.
- Its greatest annual precipitation was 798.3 mm (31.43 in) in 2007.
- Its least annual precipitation was 345.8 mm (13.61 in) in 2018.
- The longest annual sunshine was 2,246.7 hours in 2018.
- The shortest annual sunshine was 1,355.3 hours in 1903.

Climate data for Potsdam (1991–2020 normals, extremes 1893–present)
Month	Jan	Feb	Mar	Apr	May	Jun	Jul	Aug	Sep	Oct	Nov	Dec	Year
Record high °C (°F)	15.6 (60.1)	19.9 (67.8)	25.7 (78.3)	31.8 (89.2)	34.0 (93.2)	40.4 (104.7)	38.9 (102.0)	38.6 (101.5)	35.0 (95.0)	27.8 (82.0)	21.5 (70.7)	17.3 (63.1)	40.4 (104.7)
Mean maximum °C (°F)	10.5 (50.9)	12.4 (54.3)	18.2 (64.8)	24.9 (76.8)	29.1 (84.4)	32.1 (89.8)	33.1 (91.6)	33.0 (91.4)	27.0 (80.6)	21.3 (70.3)	14.6 (58.3)	10.9 (51.6)	35.2 (95.4)
Mean daily maximum °C (°F)	3.2 (37.8)	4.9 (40.8)	9.2 (48.6)	15.7 (60.3)	20.0 (68.0)	23.0 (73.4)	25.1 (77.2)	24.9 (76.8)	19.9 (67.8)	13.7 (56.7)	7.6 (45.7)	3.9 (39.0)	14.3 (57.7)
Daily mean °C (°F)	0.7 (33.3)	1.6 (34.9)	4.7 (40.5)	9.9 (49.8)	14.2 (57.6)	17.4 (63.3)	19.4 (66.9)	18.9 (66.0)	14.6 (58.3)	9.6 (49.3)	4.8 (40.6)	1.7 (35.1)	9.8 (49.6)
Mean daily minimum °C (°F)	−1.9 (28.6)	−1.4 (29.5)	0.9 (33.6)	4.7 (40.5)	8.8 (47.8)	12.1 (53.8)	14.4 (57.9)	14.1 (57.4)	10.4 (50.7)	6.2 (43.2)	2.2 (36.0)	−0.7 (30.7)	5.8 (42.4)
Mean minimum °C (°F)	−11.0 (12.2)	−8.6 (16.5)	−4.7 (23.5)	−1.5 (29.3)	2.9 (37.2)	7.3 (45.1)	9.8 (49.6)	9.4 (48.9)	5.5 (41.9)	0.0 (32.0)	−4.0 (24.8)	−8.4 (16.9)	−13.0 (8.6)
Record low °C (°F)	−25.7 (−14.3)	−26.8 (−16.2)	−17.3 (0.9)	−7.3 (18.9)	−3.6 (25.5)	1.9 (35.4)	5.8 (42.4)	5.4 (41.7)	0.1 (32.2)	−9.0 (15.8)	−16.6 (2.1)	−24.5 (−12.1)	−26.8 (−16.2)
Average precipitation mm (inches)	45.3 (1.78)	36.1 (1.42)	39.3 (1.55)	29.2 (1.15)	53.3 (2.10)	60.8 (2.39)	76.2 (3.00)	59.2 (2.33)	47.1 (1.85)	42.8 (1.69)	42.3 (1.67)	46.1 (1.81)	577.6 (22.74)
Average extreme snow depth cm (inches)	8.6 (3.4)	8.6 (3.4)	3.6 (1.4)	0.5 (0.2)	0 (0)	0 (0)	0 (0)	0 (0)	0 (0)	trace	2.1 (0.8)	7.1 (2.8)	13.1 (5.2)
Average precipitation days (≥ 1.0 mm)	16.8	14.7	14.9	11.5	12.8	12.8	14.0	13.0	12.2	13.8	15.4	17.1	168.9
Average snowy days (≥ 1.0 cm)	11.2	9.4	3.6	0.4	0	0	0	0	0	0	1.9	5.9	32.1
Average relative humidity (%)	87.6	82.6	76.5	66.8	68.5	69.1	70.0	71.3	78.3	85.4	89.8	89.5	77.9
Mean monthly sunshine hours	55.6	79.1	128.9	198.2	233.4	236.9	244.8	229.2	172.9	121.7	60.3	46.5	1,807.6
Source 1: World Meteorological Organization
Source 2: Deutscher Wetterdienst / SKlima.de

== Etymology ==
The name "Potsdam" originally seems to have been Poztupimi. A common theory is that it derives from an old West Slavonic term meaning "beneath the oaks", i.e., the corrupted pod dubmi/dubimi (pod "beneath", dub "oak"). However, some question this explanation.

== History ==
=== Pre- and early history ===
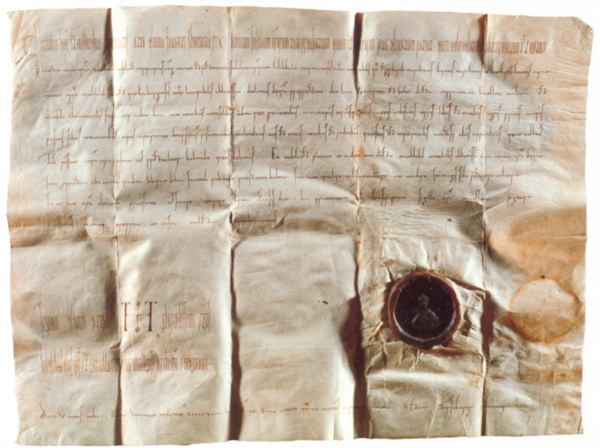
Document from the Holy Roman Empire in 993 mentioning Poztupimi

The area around Potsdam shows signs of occupancy since the Bronze Age and was part of Magna Germania as described by Tacitus. After the great migrations of the Germanic peoples, Slavs moved in and Potsdam was probably founded after the 7th century as a settlement of the Hevelli tribe centred on a castle. It was first mentioned in a document in 993 as Poztupimi, when Emperor Otto III gifted the territory to the Quedlinburg Abbey, then led by his aunt Matilda. By 1317, it was mentioned as a small town. It gained its town charter in 1345. In 1573, it was still a small market town of 2,000 inhabitants.

=== Early modern era ===
Potsdam lost nearly half of its population due to the Thirty Years' War (1618–1648).

A continuous Hohenzollern possession since 1415, Potsdam became prominent, when it was chosen in 1660 as the hunting residence of Frederick William I, Elector of Brandenburg, the core of the powerful state that later became the Kingdom of Prussia. It also housed Prussian barracks.

After the Edict of Potsdam in 1685, Potsdam became a centre of European immigration. Its religious freedom attracted people from France (Huguenots), Russia, the Netherlands and Bohemia. The edict accelerated population growth and economic recovery.

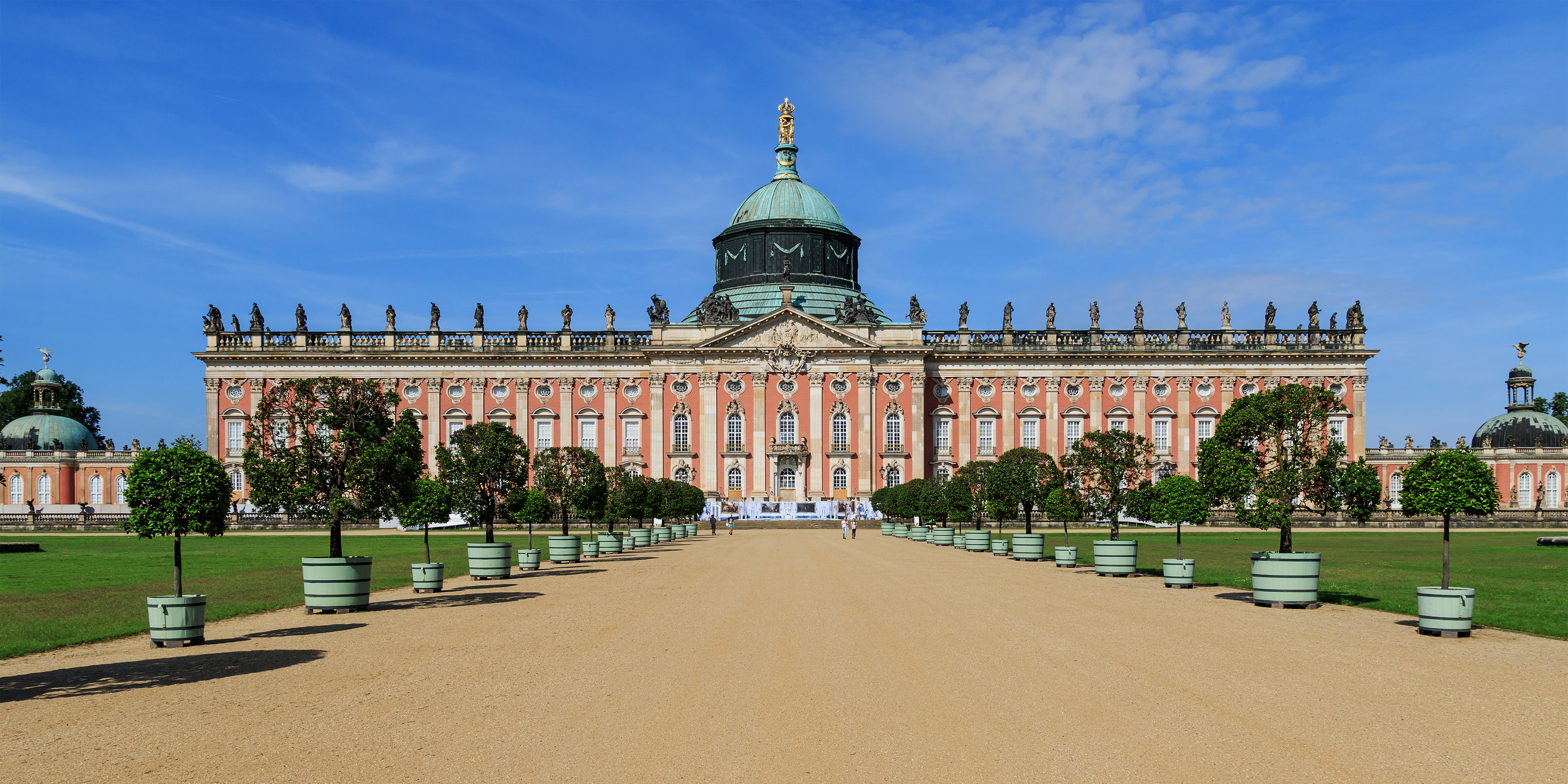
New Palace in 2017

Later, the city became a full residence of the Prussian royal family. The buildings of the royal residences were built mainly during the reign of Frederick the Great. One of these is the Sanssouci Palace (French: "without cares" or "no concern", by Georg Wenzeslaus von Knobelsdorff, 1744), famed for its formal gardens and Rococo interiors. Other royal residences include the New Palace and the Orangery.

In 1815, at the formation of the Province of Brandenburg, Potsdam became the provincial capital until 1918, except for a period between 1827 and 1843 when Berlin was the provincial capital (as it became once again after 1918). The province comprised two governorates named after their capitals Potsdam and Frankfurt (Oder).

=== Governorate of Potsdam ===
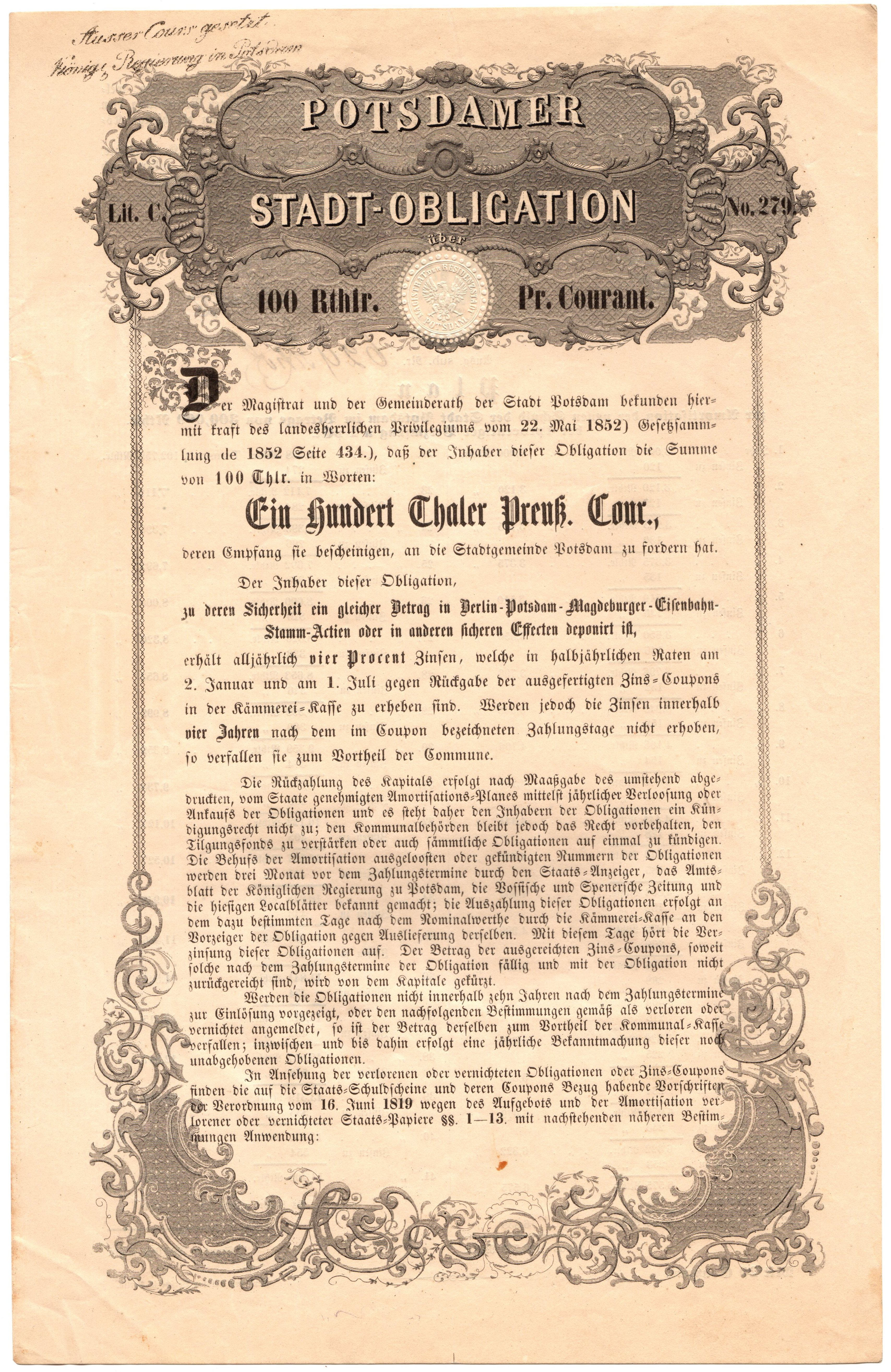
Bond of Potsdam, issued 22 May 1852

Between 1815 and 1945, the city of Potsdam served as capital of the Regierungsbezirk of Potsdam (German: Regierungsbezirk Potsdam). The Regierungsbezirk encompassed the former districts of Uckermark, the Mark of Priegnitz, and the greater part of the Middle March. It was situated between Mecklenburg and the Province of Pomerania on the north, and the Province of Saxony on the south and west (Berlin, with a small surrounding district, was an urban governorate and enclave within the governorate of Potsdam between 1815 and 1822, then it merged as urban district into the governorate only to be disentangled again from Potsdam governorate in 1875, becoming a distinct province-like entity on 1 April 1881). Towards the north west the governorate was bounded by the rivers Elbe and the Havel, and on the north east by the Oder. The south eastern boundary was to the neighbouring governorate of Frankfurt (Oder). About 500,000 inhabitants lived in the Potsdam governorate, which covered an area of about 20,700 square kilometres (7,992 sq mi), divided into thirteen rural districts, partially named after their capitals:

Angermünde	Beeskow-Storkow (as of 1836)	East Havelland	East Prignitz
Jüterbog-Luckenwalde	Lower Barnim	Prenzlau	Ruppin
Teltow (as of 1836)	Teltow-Storkow (until 1835)	Templin	Upper Barnim
West Havelland	West Prignitz	Zauch-Belzig	

The traditional towns in the governorate were small, however, in the course of the industrial labour migration some reached the rank of urban districts. The principal towns were Brandenburg upon Havel, Köpenick, Potsdam, Prenzlau, Spandau and Ruppin. Until 1875 Berlin also was a town within the governorate. After its disentanglement a number of its suburbs outside Berlin's municipal borders grew to towns, many forming urban Bezirke within the governorate of Potsdam such as Charlottenburg, Lichtenberg, Rixdorf (after 1912 Neukölln), and Schöneberg (all of which, as well as Köpenick and Spandau, incorporated into Greater Berlin in 1920). The urban Bezirke were (years indicating the elevation to rank of urban Bezirk or affiliation with Potsdam governorate, respectively):

Berlin (1822–1875)	Brandenburg/Havel (as of 1881)	Charlottenburg (1877–1920)	Eberswalde (as of 1911)
Lichtenberg (1908–1920)	Schöneberg (1899–1920)	Deutsch-Wilmersdorf (1907–1920)	Rixdorf (Neukölln) (1899–1920)
Potsdam	Rathenow (as of 1925)	Spandau (1886–1920)	Wittenberge (as of 1922)

=== 20th century ===
Berlin was the capital of Prussia and later of the German Empire, but the court remained in Potsdam, where many government officials settled. In 1914, Emperor Wilhelm II signed the Declaration of War in the Neues Palais (New Palace). The city lost its status as a "second capital" in 1918, when Wilhelm II abdicated and Germany became a Republic at the end of World War I.

After the Nazis seized power in 1933, there was a ceremonial handshake between President Paul von Hindenburg and the new Chancellor Adolf Hitler on 21 March 1933 in Potsdam's Garrison Church in what became known as the "Day of Potsdam". This symbolised a coalition of the military (Reichswehr) and Nazism. Potsdam was severely damaged by Allied bombing raids during World War II, particularly one targeted at its Old Town on 14 April 1945.

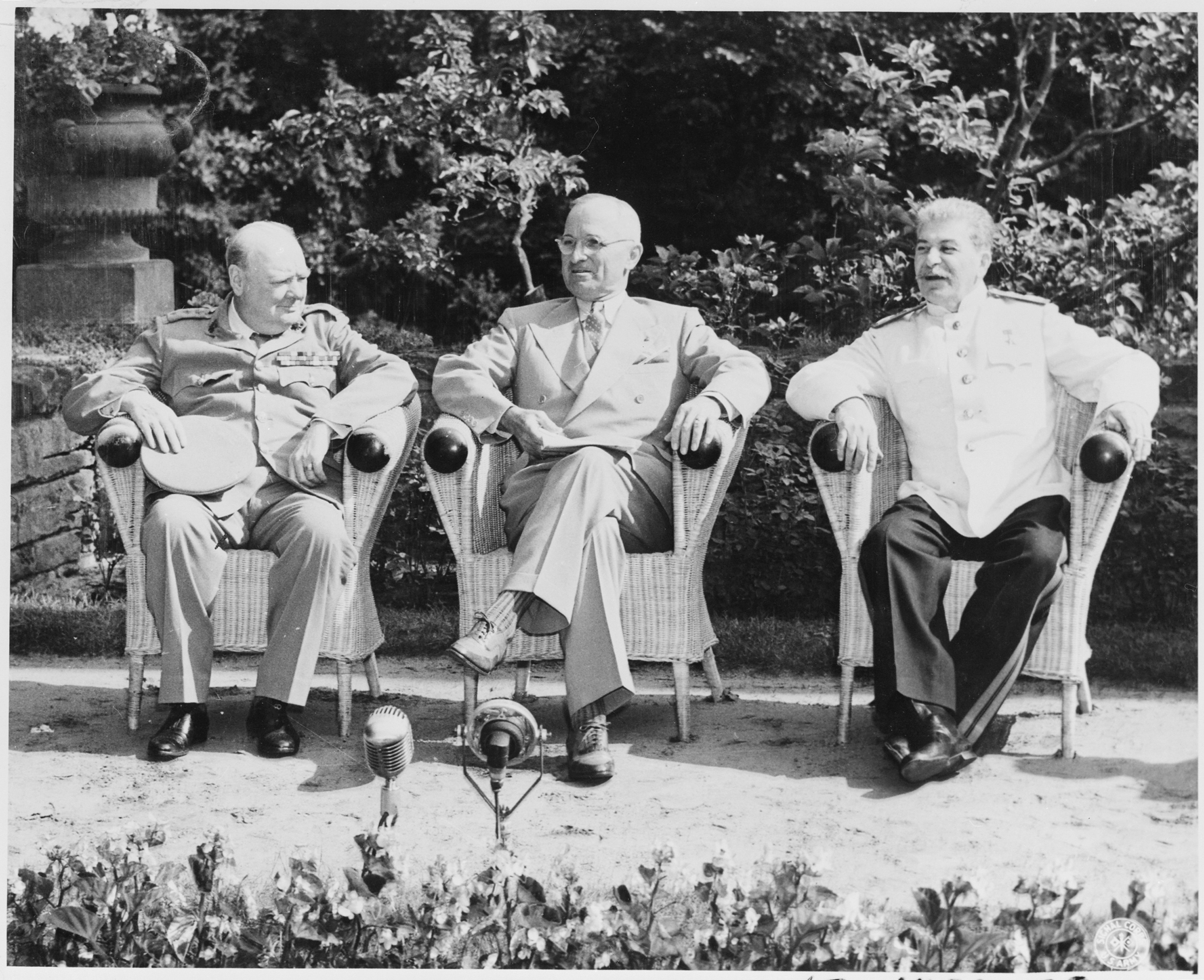
Potsdam Conference in 1945 with Winston Churchill, Harry S. Truman and Joseph Stalin

The Cecilienhof Palace was the scene of the Potsdam Conference from 17 July to 2 August 1945, at which the victorious Allied leaders Harry S. Truman, Winston Churchill and Joseph Stalin met to decide the future of Germany and postwar Europe in general. The conference ended with the Potsdam Agreement and the Potsdam Declaration.

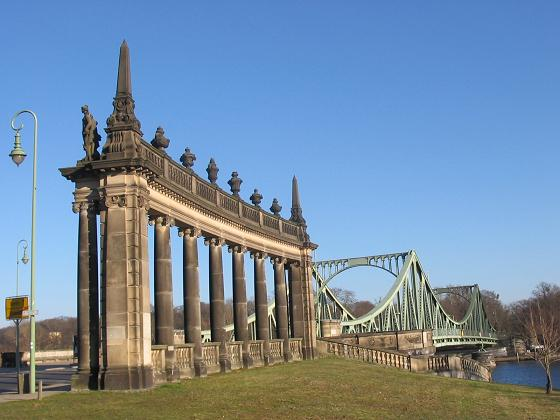
The Glienicke Bridge, used for exchanging spies during the Cold War

The government of East Germany (formally known as the German Democratic Republic (German: Deutsche Demokratische Republik, DDR)) tried to remove symbols of "Prussian militarism". Many historic buildings, some of them badly damaged in the war, were demolished.

When in 1946 the remainder of the province of Brandenburg west of the Oder–Neisse line was constituted as the state of Brandenburg, Potsdam became its capital. In 1952 the GDR disestablished its states and replaced them by smaller new East German administrative districts known as Bezirke. Potsdam became the capital of the new Bezirk Potsdam until 1990.

Potsdam, south-west of Berlin, lay just outside West Berlin after the construction of the Berlin Wall. The walling off of West Berlin not only isolated Potsdam from West Berlin, but also doubled commuting times to East Berlin. The Glienicke Bridge across the Havel connected the city to West Berlin and was the scene of some Cold War exchanges of spies.

After German reunification, Potsdam became the capital of the newly re-established state of Brandenburg. Since then there have been many ideas and efforts to reconstruct the original appearance of the city, including the Potsdam City Palace and the Garrison Church.

== Demography ==
Since 2000 Potsdam has been one of the fastest-growing cities in Germany.

Development of population since 1875 within the current boundaries (blue line: population; dotted line: comparison to population development of Brandenburg state; grey background: time of Nazi rule; red background: time of communist rule)

Recent population development and projections (population development before 2011 census (blue line); recent population development according to the Census in Germany in 2011 and 2022 (blue bordered line); official projection for 2024–2040 in three variants (dotted lines 2025–2040)

Potsdam: Population development
within the current boundaries (2025)

Year	Pop.	±% p.a.
1875	61,719	—
1890	77,301	+1.51%
1910	101,950	+1.39%
1925	107,734	+0.37%
1933	116,947	+1.03%
1939	125,664	+1.21%
1946	113,035	−1.50%

Year	Pop.	±% p.a.
1950	114,663	+0.36%
1964	117,711	+0.19%
1971	118,923	+0.15%
1981	139,746	+1.63%
1985	146,746	+1.23%
1990	147,252	+0.07%
1995	144,118	−0.43%

Year	Pop.	±% p.a.
2000	140,668	−0.48%
2005	147,583	+0.96%
2010	156,906	+1.23%
2015	167,745	+1.34%
2020	182,112	+1.66%
2025	185,137	+0.33%

=== International residents ===
Largest groups of foreign residents:

Rank	Nationality	Population (November 31, 2019)
1	Ukraine	2,947
2	Syria	2,415
3	Russia	1,305
4	Poland	1,186
5	Vietnam	1,063
6	France	973
7	Croatia	885
8	Romania	795
9	Pakistan	743
10	Italy	647

== Governance ==
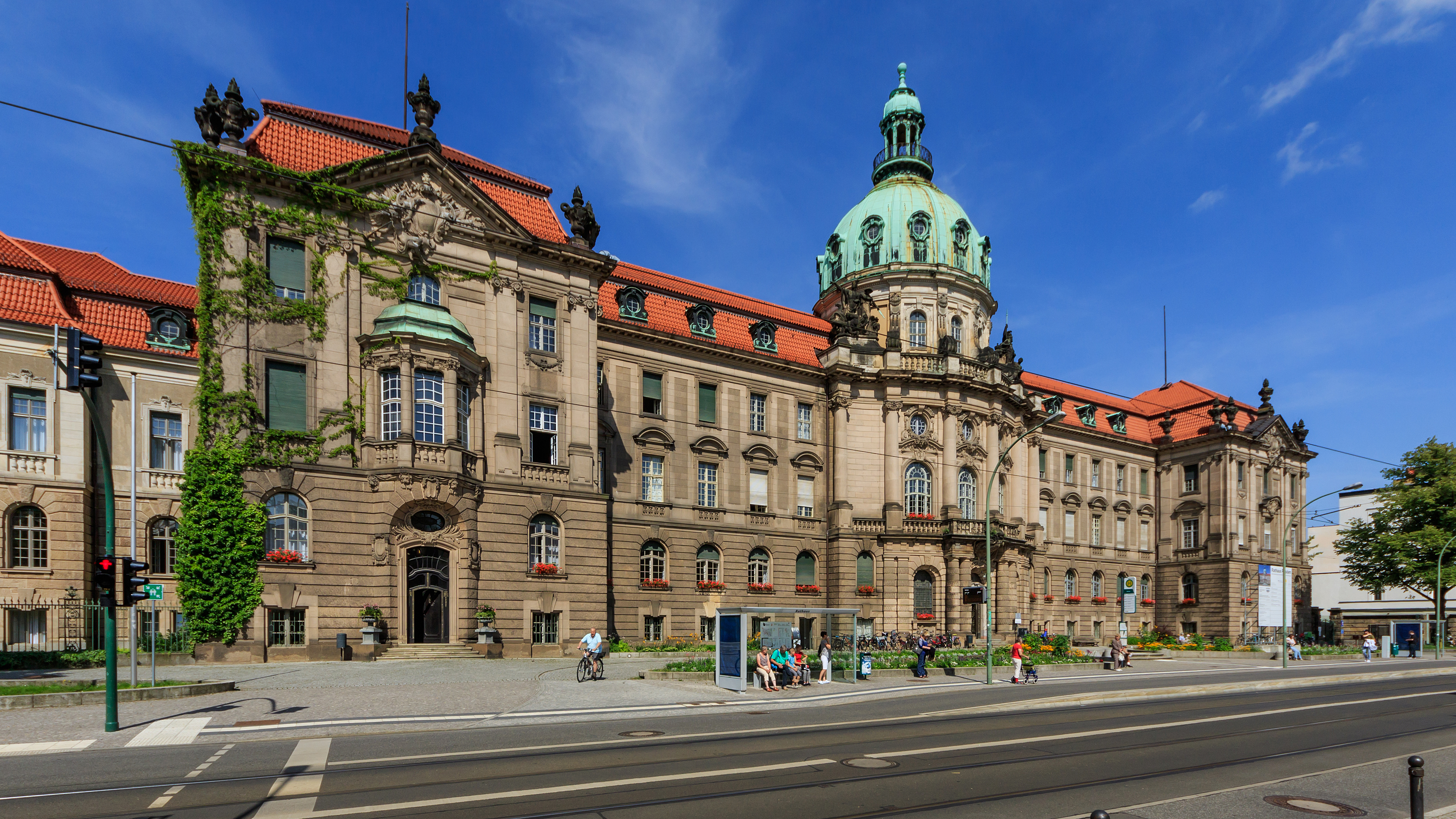
Potsdamer Stadthaus, the city hall

=== City government ===
Potsdam has had a mayor (Bürgermeister) and city council since the 15th century. From 1809 the city council was elected, with a mayor (Oberbürgermeister) at its head. During Nazi Germany, the mayor was selected by the NSDAP and the city council was dissolved; it was reconstituted in token form after 1945, but free elections did not take place until after reunification.

Today, the city council is the city's central administrative authority. Local elections took place on 26 October 2003 and again in 2008. Between 1990 and 1999, the Chairman of the City Council was known as the "Town President" but today the post is the "Chairman of the City Council". The mayor is elected directly by the population.

Independent politician Noosha Aubel is the current mayor since 2025. The most recent mayoral election was held on 21 September 2025, with a runoff held on 12 October, and the results were as follows:

Candidate	Party	First round		Second round	
Candidate	Party	Votes	%	Votes	%
Noosha Aubel	Independent (Grüne, Volt, aNDERE, BfW)	26,839	34.0	43,446	72.9
Severin Fischer	Social Democratic Party	13,390	16.9	16,177	27.1
Clemens Viehrig	Christian Democratic Union	13,050	16.5		
Dirk Harder	The Left	12,661	16.0		
Chaled-Uwe Said	Alternative for Germany	10,234	13.0		
Michael Reichert	BVB/Free Voters	2,203	2.8		
Alexander Wietschel	Die PARTEI	625	0.8		
Valid votes		79,002	99.7	59,623	98.1
Invalid votes		238	0.3	1,157	1.9
Total		79,240	100.0	60,780	100.0
Electorate/voter turnout		142,889	55.5	143,046	42.5
Source: City of Potsdam (1st round, 2nd round)

The city council governs the city alongside the mayor. The most recent city council election was held on 9 June 2024, and the results were as follows:

Party	Votes	%	+/-	Seats	+/-
Social Democratic Party (SPD)	57,258	19.4	▲0.1	11	0
Christian Democratic Union (CDU)	43,494	14.7	▲2.3	8	▲1
Alliance 90/The Greens (Grüne)	42,804	14.5	▼4.3	8	▼2
Alternative for Germany (AfD)	40,321	13.7	▲4.2	8	▲3
The Others (aNDERE)	29,973	10.2	▼0.2	6	0
The Left (Die Linke)	25,778	8.7	▼9.3	5	▼5
Citizens' Alliance Free Voters (BfW)	16,167	5.5	New	3	New
Free Democratic Party (FDP)	13,155	4.5	▼0.4	2	▼1
Brandenburg Free Voters (BVB/FW)	8,686	2.9	▲1.8	2	▲1
Die PARTEI	7,837	2.7	▲1.1	1	▲1
Volt Germany (Volt)	5,503	1.9	New	0	New
Potsdam Centre (Mitten)	3,559	1.2	New	0	New
Independent Witzsche	485	0.2	New	0	New
Valid votes	295,020	100.0		56	±0
Invalid ballots	1,665	1.7			
Total ballots	100,728	100.0			
Electorate/voter turnout	143,118	70.4	▲8.1		
Source: City of Potsdam

=== Brandenburg state government ===
The Landtag Brandenburg, the parliament of the state of Brandenburg is in Potsdam. It has been housed in the Potsdam City Palace since 2014.

== Twin towns – sister cities ==
Potsdam is twinned with:

- Opole, Poland (1973)
- Bobigny, France (1974)
- Jyväskylä, Finland (1985)
- Bonn, Germany (1988)
- Perugia, Italy (1990)
- Sioux Falls, United States (1990)
- Lucerne, Switzerland (2002)
- Versailles, France (2016)
- Zanzibar City, Tanzania (2017)
- Ivano-Frankivsk, Ukraine (2023)

== Infrastructure ==
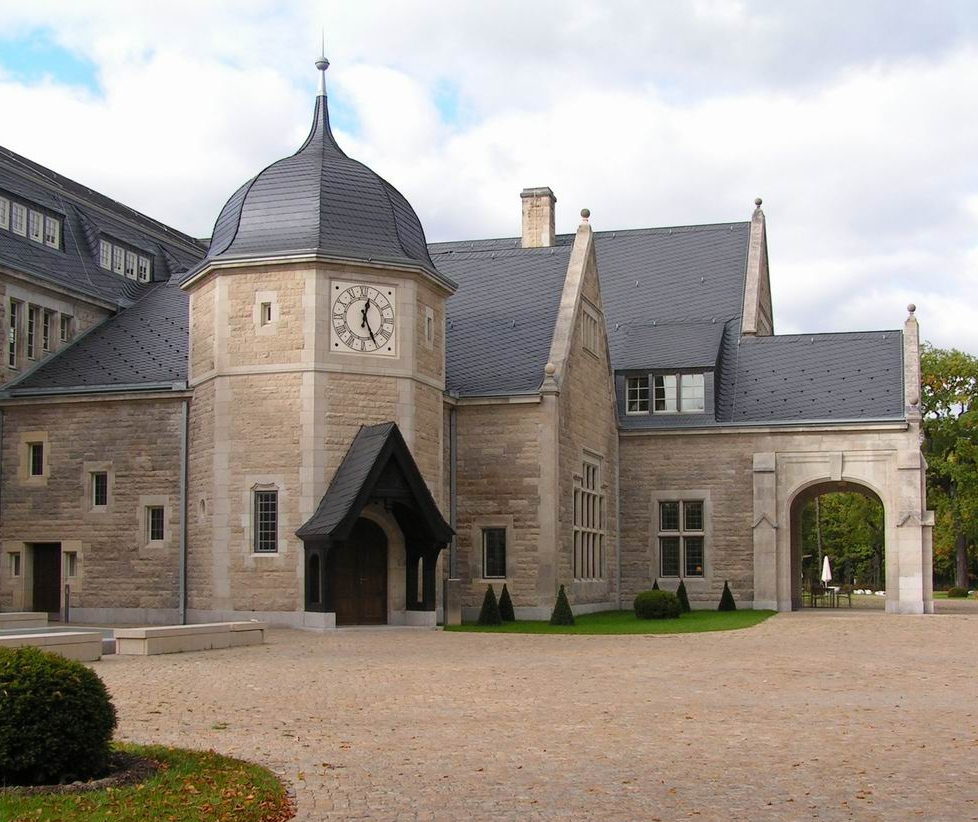
The Kaiserbahnof building

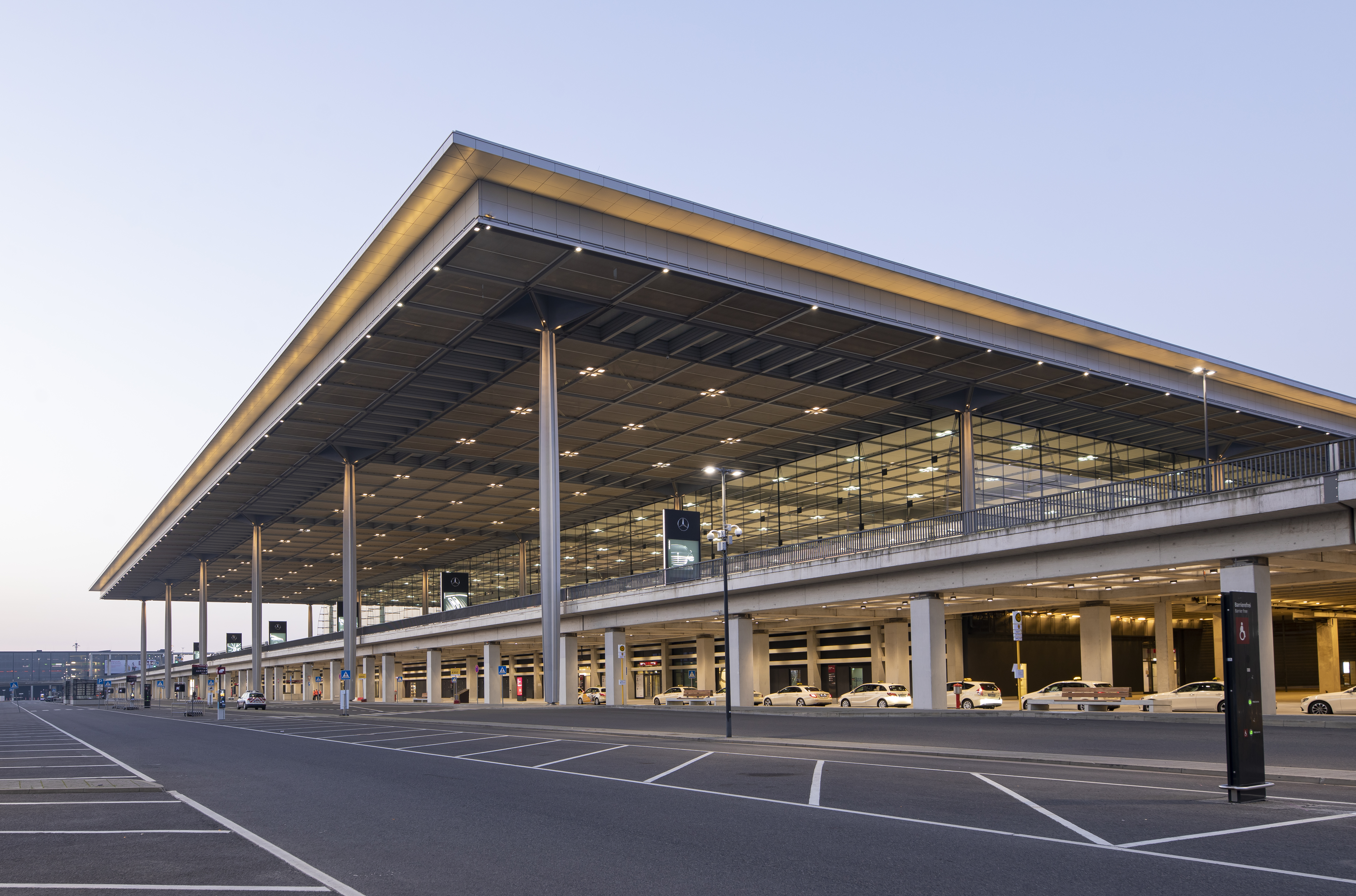
Berlin Brandenburg Airport

=== Transport ===
==== Rail transport ====
Potsdam, included in the fare zone "C" (Tarifbereich C) of Berlin's public transport area and fare zones A and B of its own public transport area, is served by the S7 S-Bahn line. The stations served are Griebnitzsee, Babelsberg and the Central Station (Hauptbahnhof), the main and long-distance station of the city. Other DB stations in Potsdam are Charlottenhof, Park Sanssouci (including the monumental Kaiserbahnhof), Medienstadt Babelsberg, Rehbrücke, Pirschheide, Golm and Marquardt. The city also possesses a 27 km-long tramway network.

==== Road transport ====
Potsdam is served by several motorways: the A 10, a beltway better known as Berliner Ring, the A 115 (using part of the AVUS) and is closely linked to the A 2 and A 9. The B 1, B 2 and B 273 federal roads cross the city. Potsdam features a network of urban and suburban buses.

==== Airports ====
Potsdam is connected to national and international air traffic via Berlin Brandenburg Airport (BER), which is around 40 kilometers to the east.

== Education and research ==
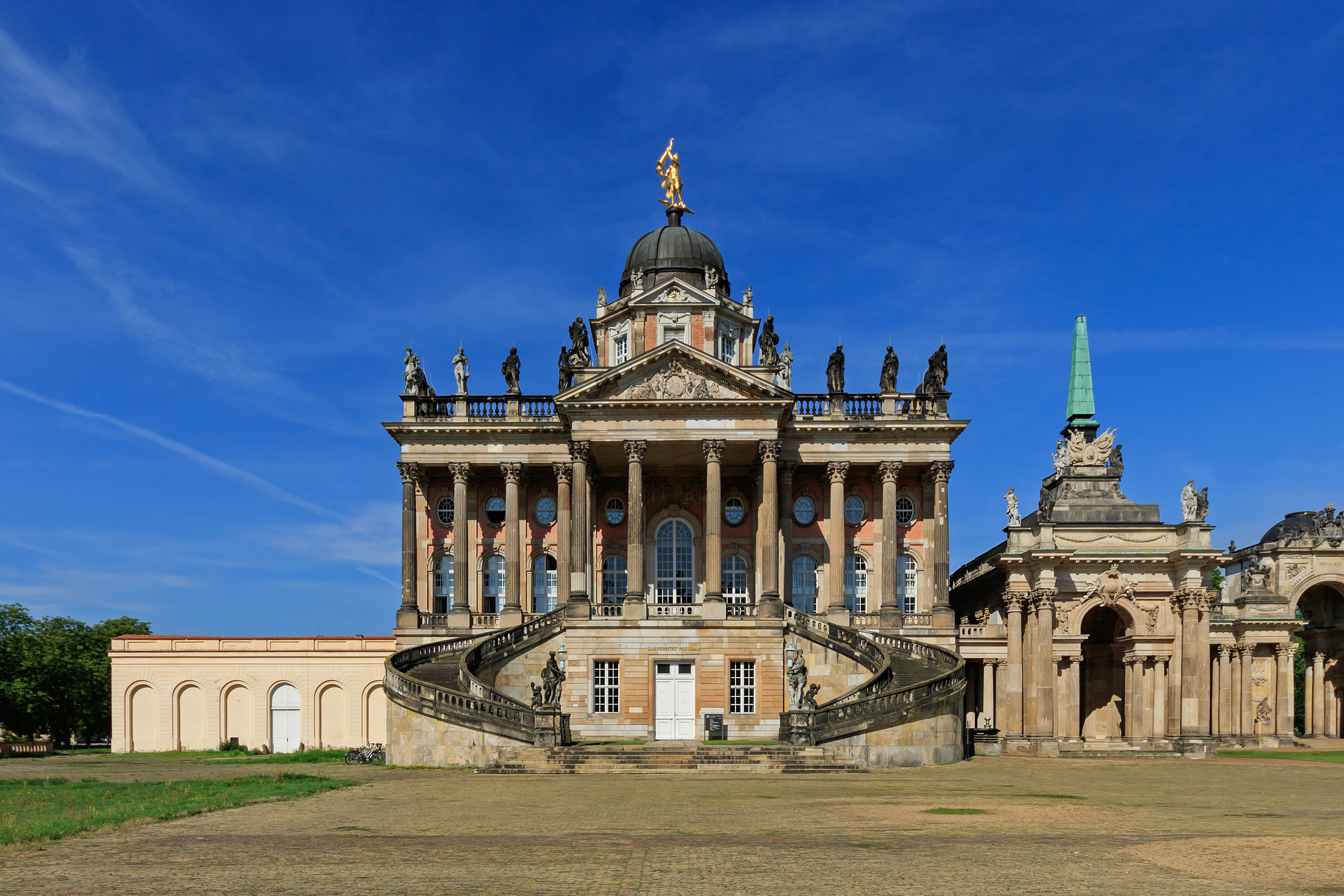
The University of Potsdam

Potsdam is a university town. The University of Potsdam was founded in 1991 as a university of the State of Brandenburg. Its predecessor was the Akademie für Staats- und Rechtswissenschaften der DDR "Walter Ulbricht", a college of education founded in 1948 which was one of the GDR's most important colleges. There are about 20,000 students enrolled at the university.

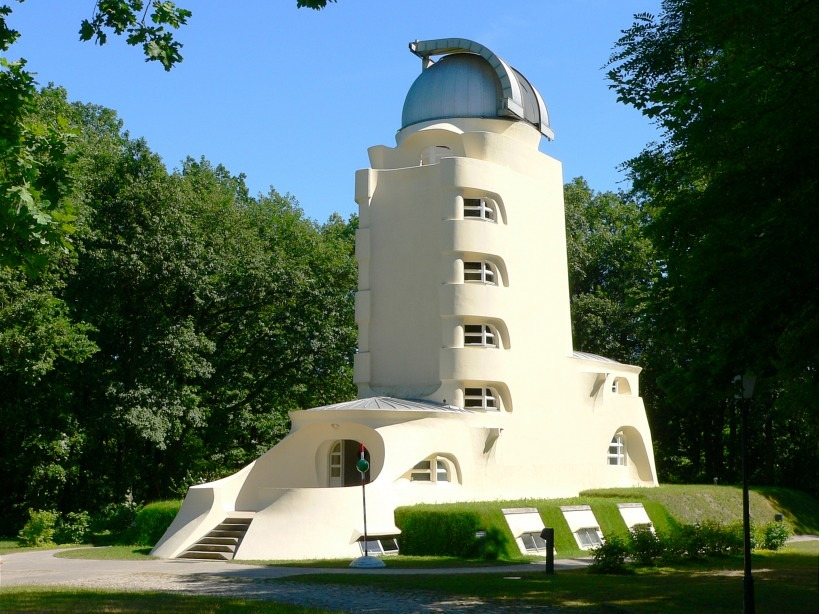
The Einstein Tower was built in 1921 to house research on the theory of relativity.

In 1991 the Fachhochschule Potsdam was founded as the second college. It had 3,518 students as of 2017.

Konrad Wolf Film University of Babelsberg (HFF), founded in 1954 in Babelsberg, is the foremost centre of the German film industry since its birth, with over 600 students.

There are also several research foundations, including Fraunhofer Institutes for Applied Polymer Research and Biomedical Engineering, Max Planck Institute for Gravitational Physics (Albert Einstein Institute), Max Planck Institute of Colloids and Interfaces, and Max Planck Institute of Molecular Plant Physiology, the GFZ – German Research Centre for Geosciences, the Potsdam Astrophysical Institute, the Institute for Advanced Sustainability Studies, the Leibniz Institute for Agricultural Engineering and Bioeconomy and the Potsdam Institute for Climate Impact Research, which employs 340 people in researching climate change.

As well as universities, Potsdam is home to reputable secondary schools. Montessori Gesamtschule Potsdam, in western Potsdam, attracts 400 students from the Brandenburg and Berlin region.

== Culture ==
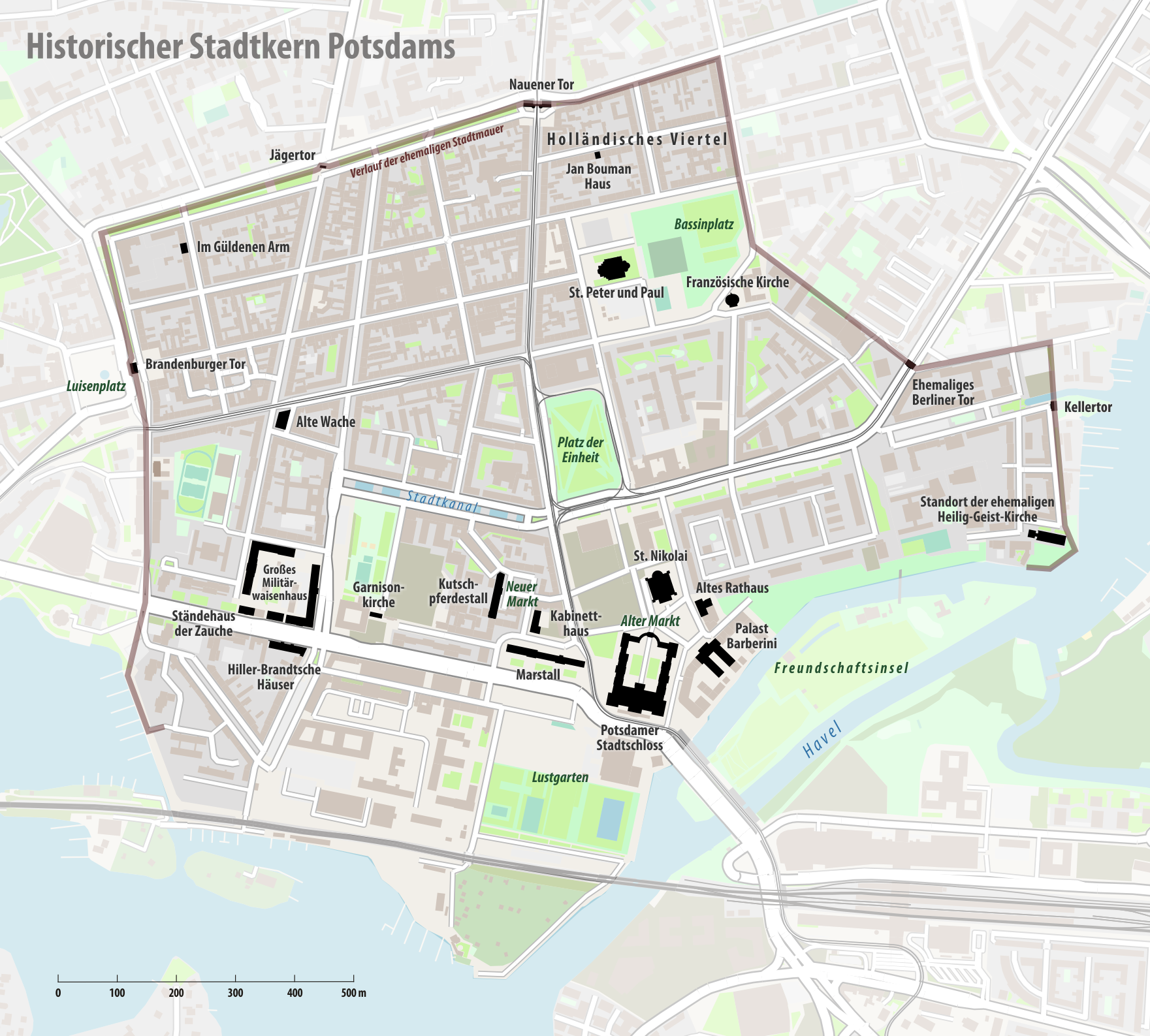
The historical centre of Potsdam

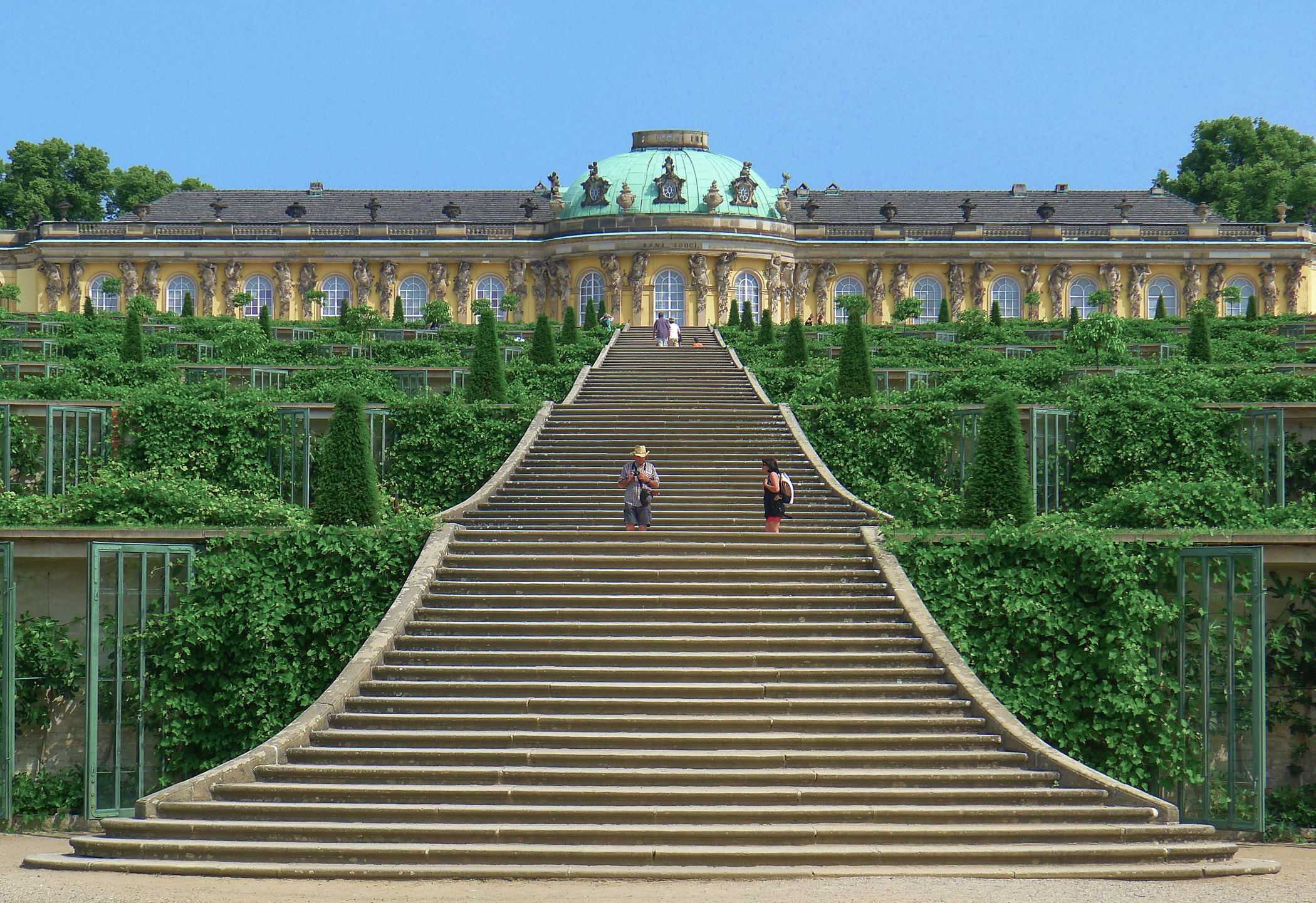
Sanssouci Palace

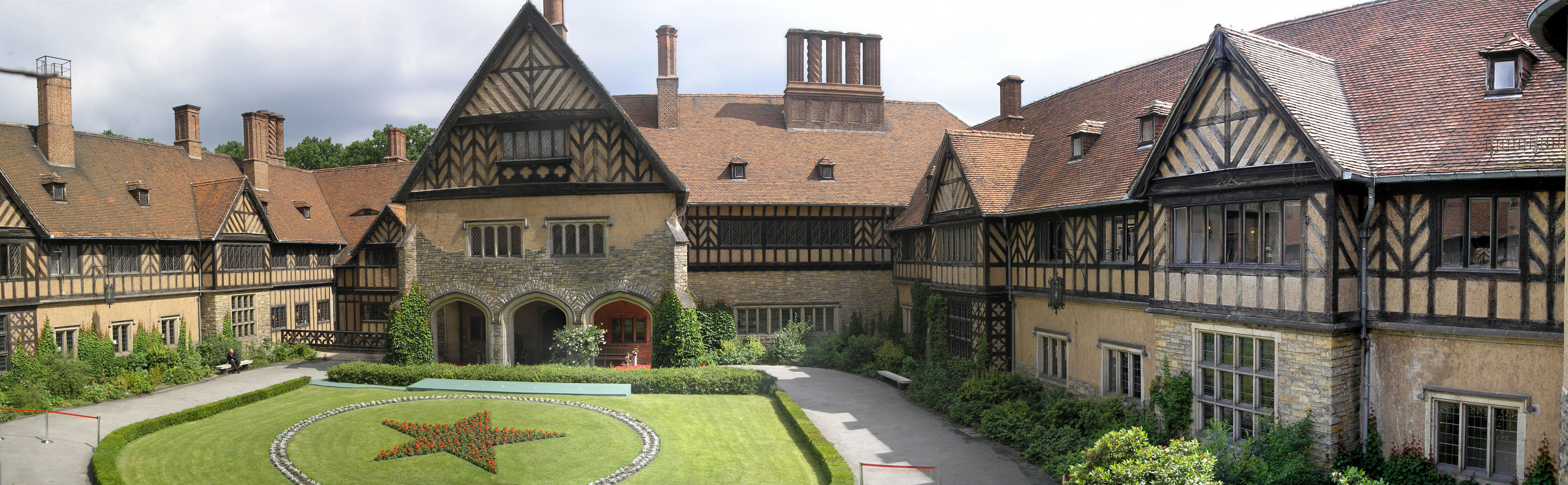
Cecilienhof palace

Potsdam was historically a centre of European immigration. Its religious tolerance attracted people from France, Russia, the Netherlands and Bohemia. This is still visible in the culture and architecture of the city.

The most popular attraction in Potsdam is Sanssouci Park, 2 km (1 mi) west of the city centre. In 1744 King Frederick the Great ordered the construction of a residence here, where he could live sans souci ("without worries", in the French spoken at the court). The park hosts a botanical garden (Botanical Garden, Potsdam) and many buildings:

- The Sanssouci Palace (Schloss Sanssouci), a relatively modest palace of the Prussian royal (and later German imperial) family
- The Orangery Palace (Orangerieschloss), former palace for foreign royal guests
- The New Palace (Neues Palais), built between 1763 and 1769 to celebrate the end of the Seven Years' War, in which Prussia held off the combined attacks of Austria and Russia. It is a much larger and grander palace than Sanssouci, having over 200 rooms and 400 statues as decoration. It served as a guest house for numerous royal visitors. Today, it houses parts of University of Potsdam.
- The Charlottenhof Palace (Schloss Charlottenhof), a Neoclassical palace by Karl Friedrich Schinkel built in 1826
- The Roman Baths (Römische Bäder), built by Karl Friedrich Schinkel and Friedrich Ludwig Persius in 1829–1840. It is a complex of buildings including a tea pavilion, a Renaissance-style villa, and a Roman bathhouse (from which the whole complex takes its name).
- The Chinese Tea House (Chinesisches Teehaus), an 18th-century pavilion built in a Chinese style, the fashion of the time.

Three gates from the original city wall remain today. The oldest is the Hunters' Gate (Jägertor), built in 1733. The Nauener Tor was built in 1755 and close to the historic Dutch Quarter. The ornate Brandenburg Gate (built in 1770, not to be confused with the Brandenburg Gate in Berlin) is situated on the Luisenplatz at the western entrance to the old town.

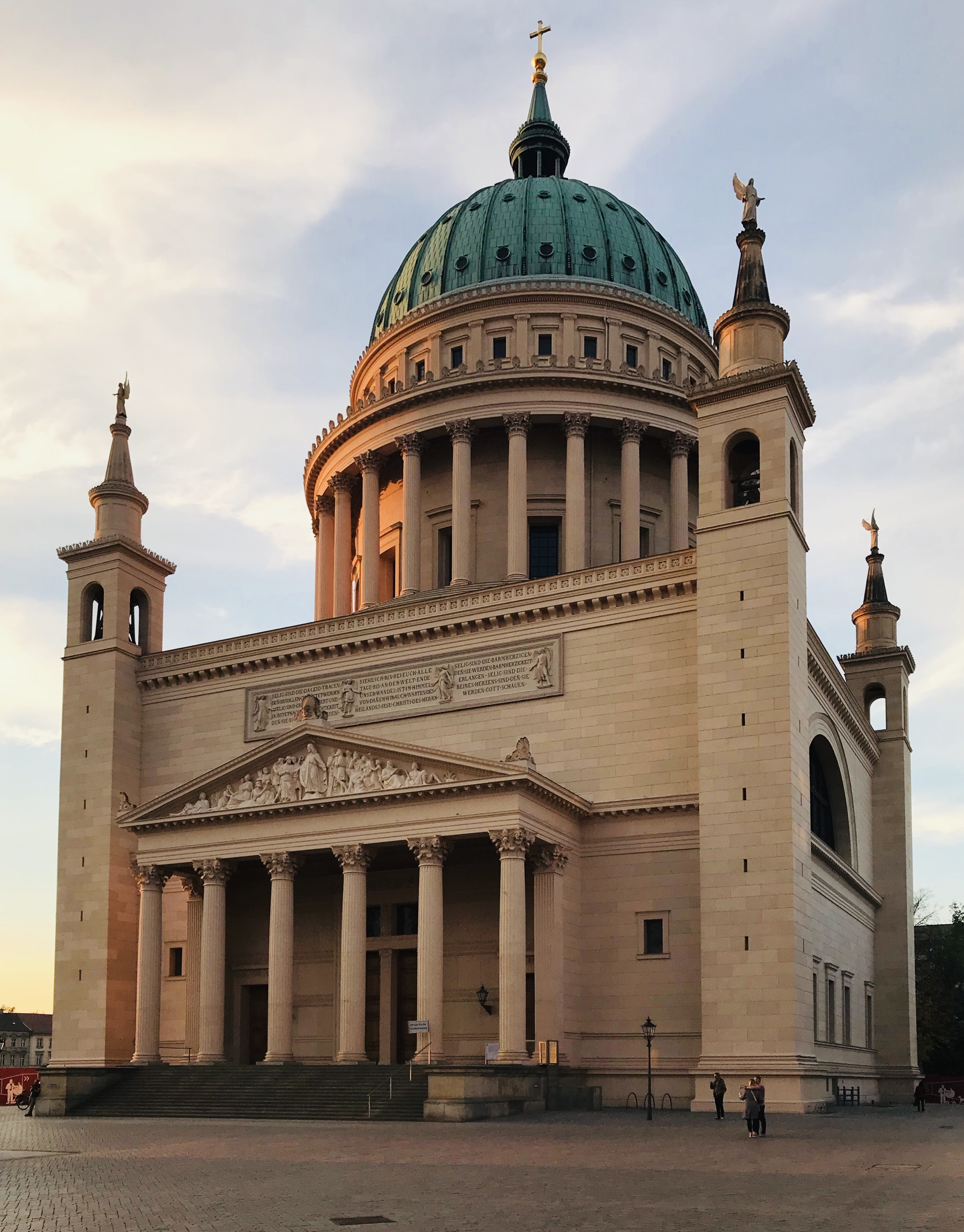
St. Nicholas' Church on the Alter Markt

The Old Market Square (Alter Markt) is Potsdam's historical city centre. For three centuries this was the site of the City Palace (Stadtschloß), a royal palace built in 1662. Under Frederick the Great, the palace became the winter residence of the Prussian kings. The palace was severely damaged by Allied bombing in 1945 and demolished in 1961 by the Communist authorities. In 2002 the Fortuna Gate (Fortunaportal) was rebuilt in its original historic position which was followed by a complete reconstruction of the palace as the Brandenburg Landtag building inaugurated in 2014. Nearby the square in the Humboldtstraße block, which also was demolished after getting damaged in 1945, reconstructions of several representative residential palaces including Palazzo Pompei and Palazzo Barberini housing an arts museum were completed in 2016–2017 alongside buildings with modernized facades to restore the historical proportions of the block.

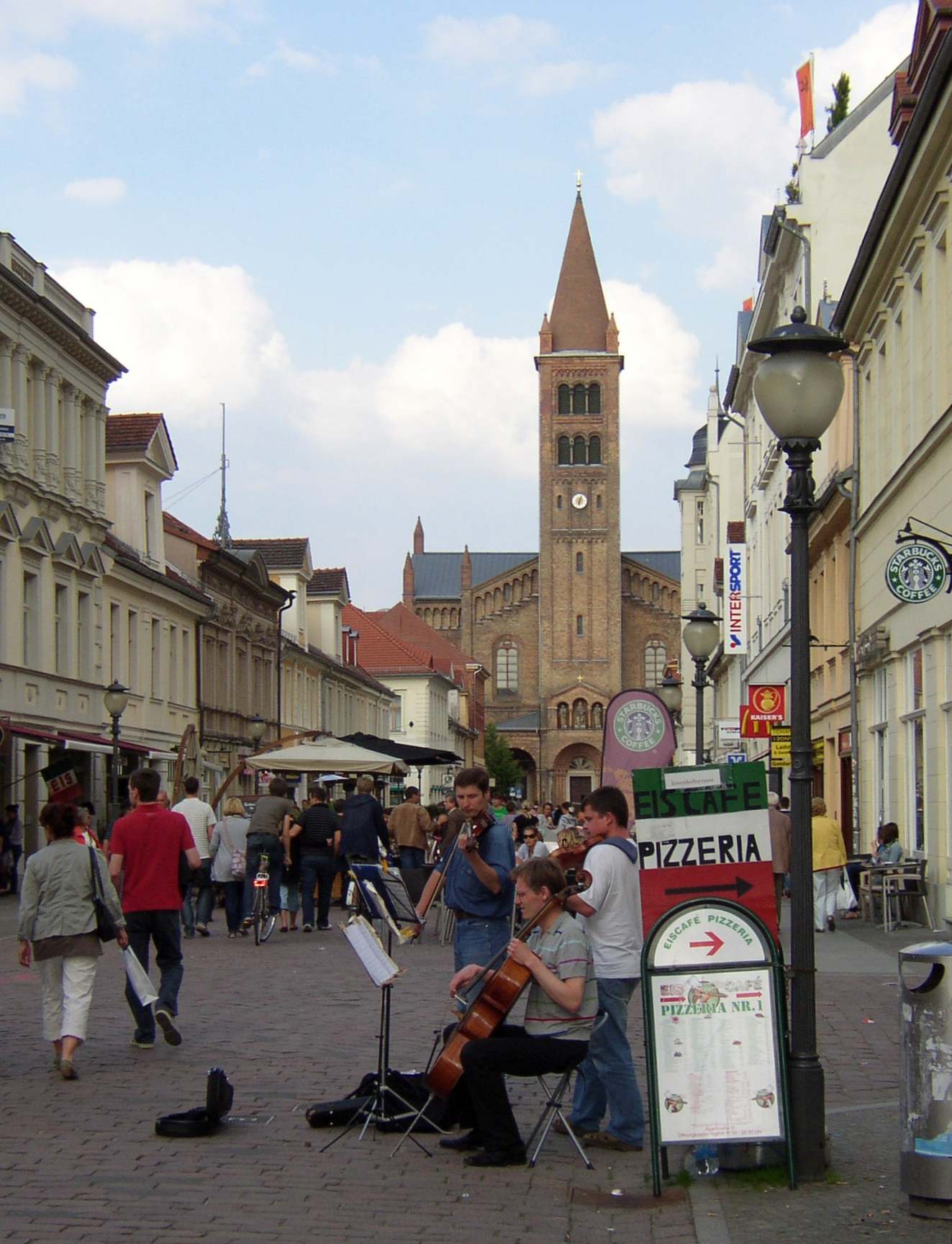
The old town (main shopping street, Brandenburger Straße)

The Old Market Square is dominated today by the dome of St. Nicholas' Church, built in 1837 in the Neoclassical style. It was the last work of Karl Friedrich Schinkel, who designed the building but did not live to see its completion. It was finished by his disciples Friedrich August Stüler and Ludwig Persius. The eastern side of the Market Square is dominated by the Old City Hall, built in 1755 by the Dutch architect Jan Bouman (1706–1776). It has a characteristic circular tower, crowned with a gilded Atlas bearing the world on his shoulders.

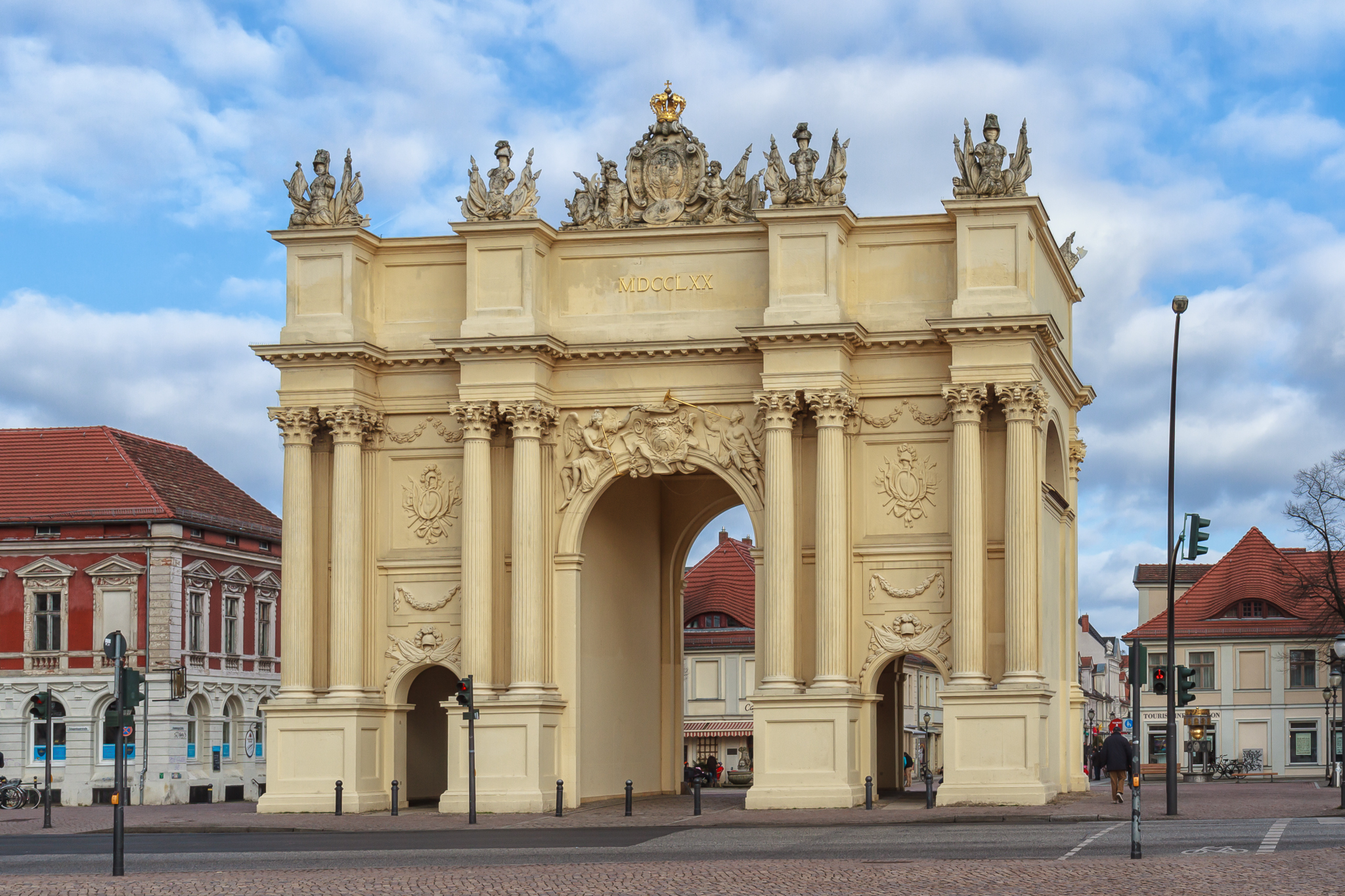
Potsdam's Brandenburg Gate

North of the Old Market Square is the oval French Church (Französische Kirche), erected in the 1750s by Boumann for the Huguenot community. To the south lies the Museum Barberini, a copy of the previous building, the Barberini Palace. The museum was funded by the German billionaire Hasso Plattner. The former Baroque building was built by Carl von Gontard in 1771–1772, inspired by the Renaissance palace Palazzo Barberini in Rome. The newly built museum was scheduled to open in spring 2017.

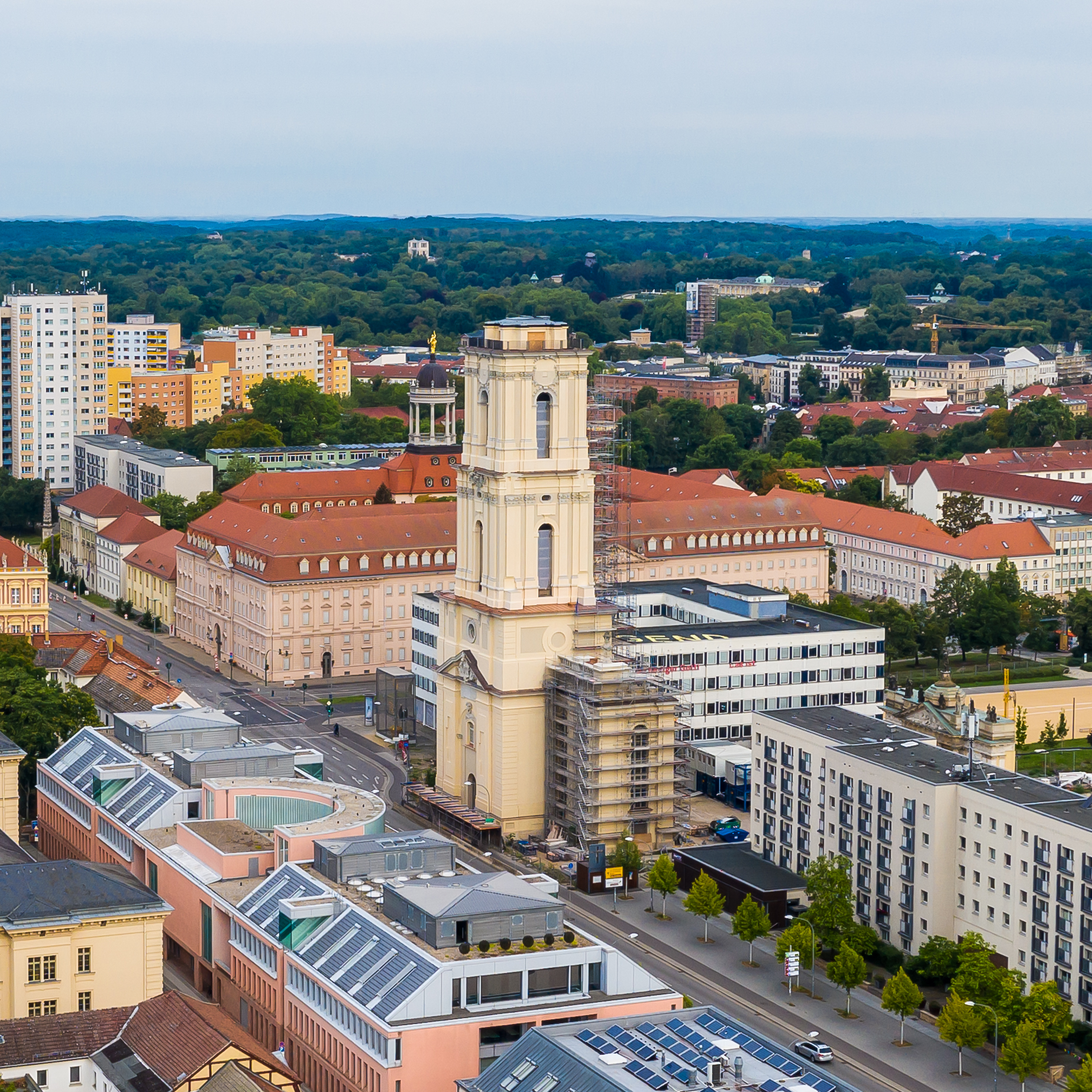
Garrison Church

The Garrison Church contains a Coventry chapel, an exhibition about the history of the place and a viewing platform at a height of 57 meters.

Another landmark of Potsdam is the two-street Dutch Quarter (Holländisches Viertel), an ensemble of buildings that is unique in Europe, with about 150 houses built of red bricks in the Dutch style. It was built between 1734 and 1742 under the direction of Jan Bouman to be used by Dutch artisans and craftsmen who had been invited to settle here by King Frederick Wilhelm I. Today, this area is one of Potsdam's most visited quarters.

North of the city centre is the Russian colony of Alexandrowka, a small enclave of Russian architecture (including an Orthodox chapel) built in 1825 for a group of Russian immigrants. Since 1999, the colony has been part of the UNESCO World Heritage Site Palaces and Parks of Potsdam and Berlin.

East of the Alexandrowka colony is a large park, the New Garden (Neuer Garten), which was laid out from 1786 in the English style. The site contains two palaces; one of them, the Cecilienhof, was where the Potsdam Conference was held in July and August 1945. The Marmorpalais (Marble Palace) was built in 1789 in Neoclassical style. Nearby is the Biosphäre Potsdam, a tropical botanical garden.

Babelsberg, a quarter south-east of the centre, houses the UFA film studios (Babelsberg Studios), and an extensive park with some historical buildings, including the Babelsberg Palace (Schloß Babelsberg, a Gothic revival palace designed by Schinkel).

The Einstein Tower is located within the Albert Einstein Science Park, which is on the top of the Telegraphenberg within an astronomy compound.

Potsdam also features a memorial centre in the former KGB prison in Leistikowstraße. In the Volkspark to the north, there is one of the last monuments dedicated to Lenin in Germany.

Potsdam joined UNESCO's Network of Creative Cities as a Design City on October 31, 2019, on the occasion of World Cities' Day.

== Parks ==
There are many parks in Potsdam, most of them UNESCO World Heritage Sites. Among their attractions are:

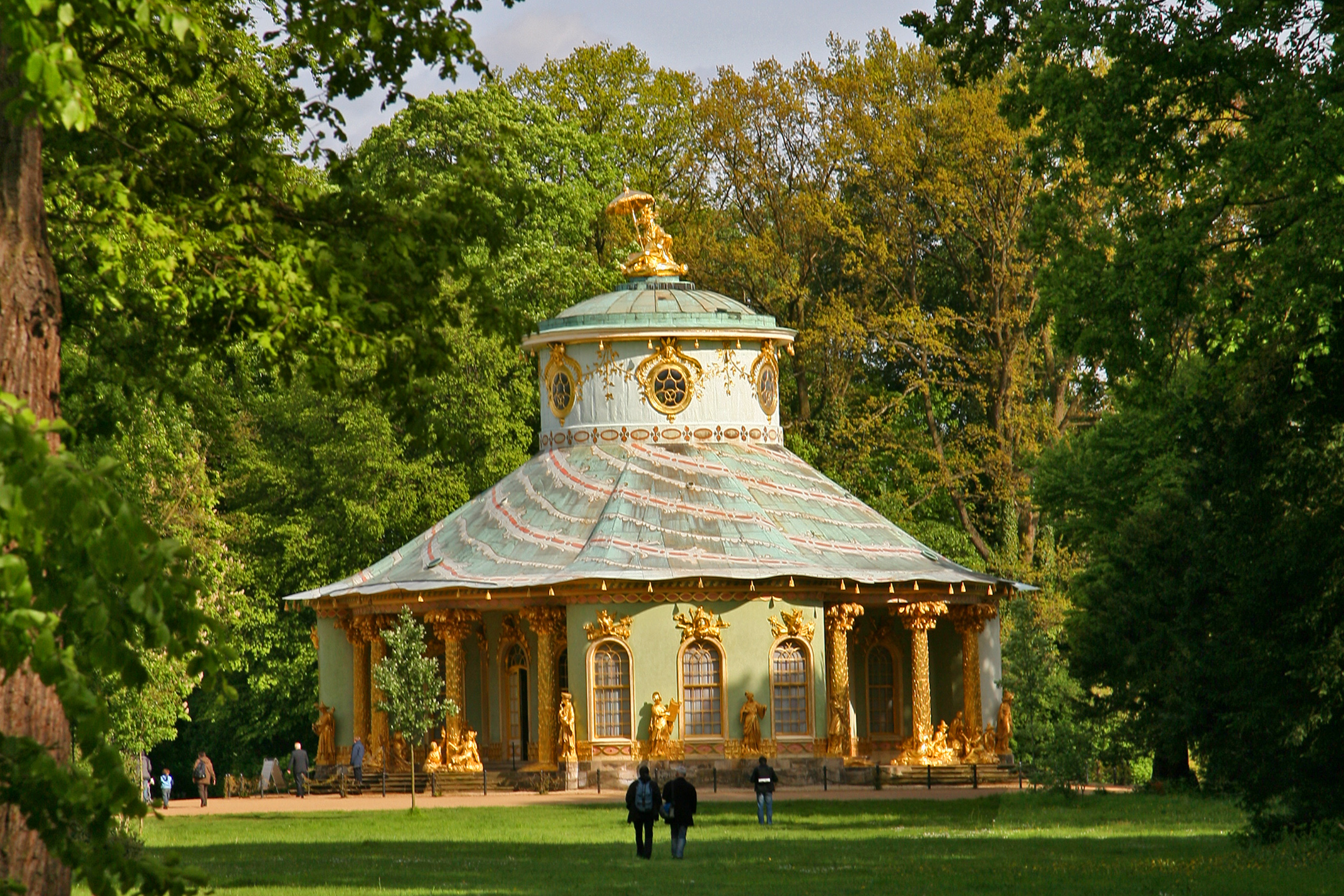
The Chinese House in Sanssouci Park

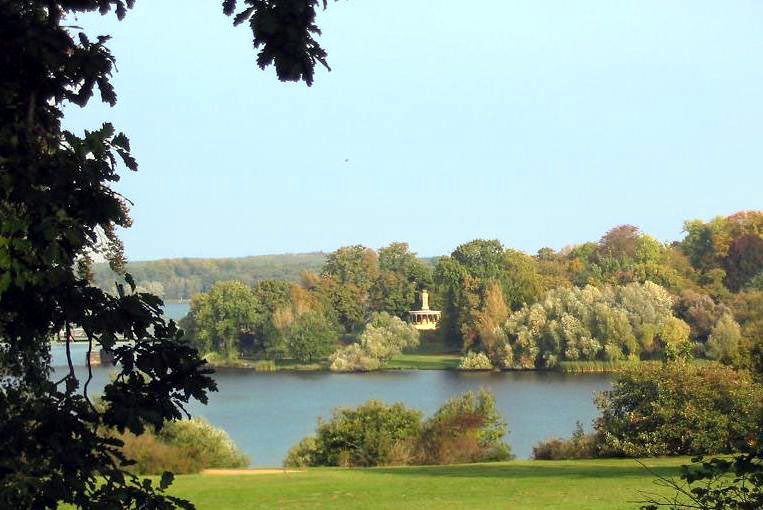
Glienicke Hunting Lodge, as seen from Babelsberg Park

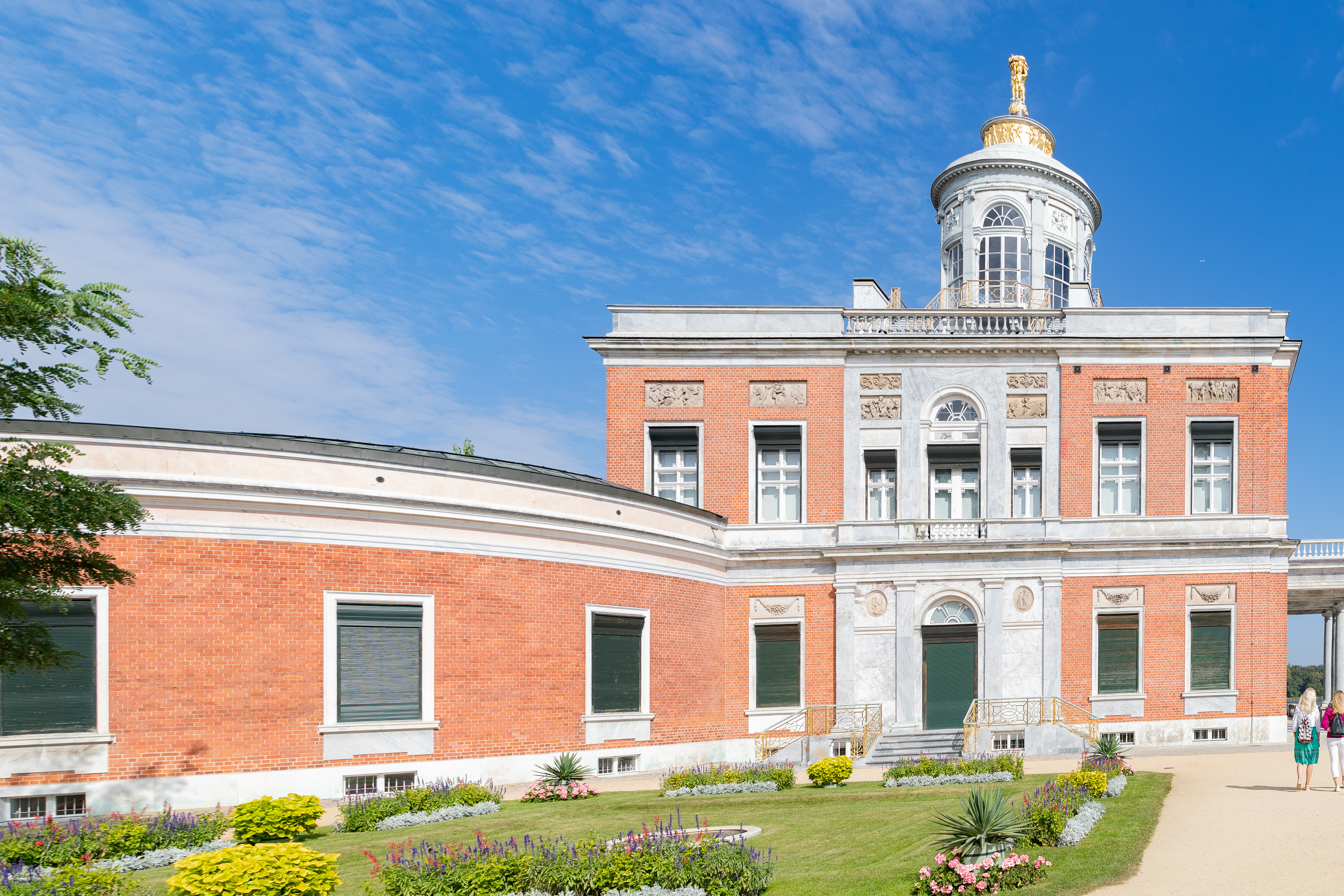
The Marmorpalais in New Garden

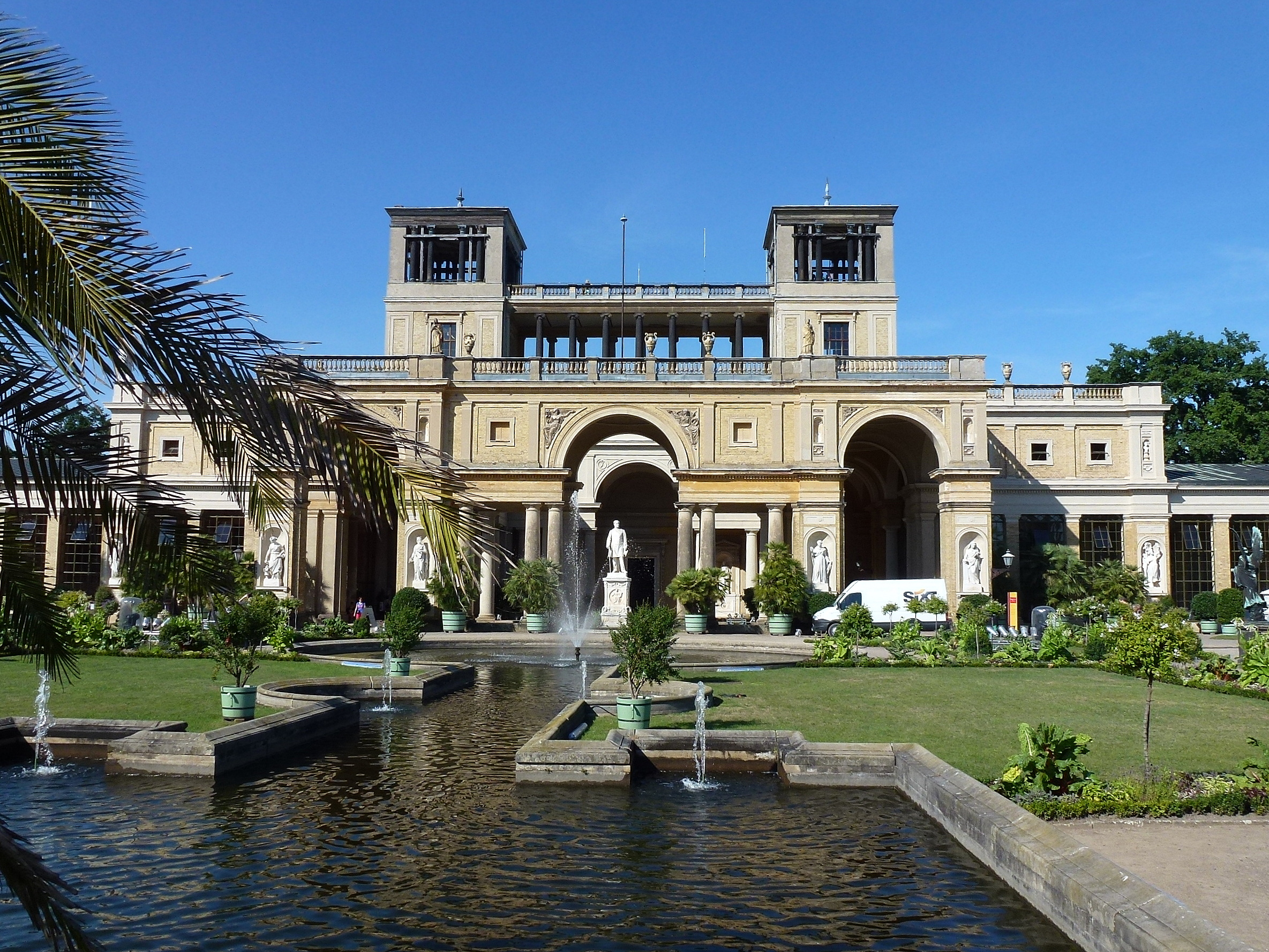
Sanssouci: the Orangery Palace

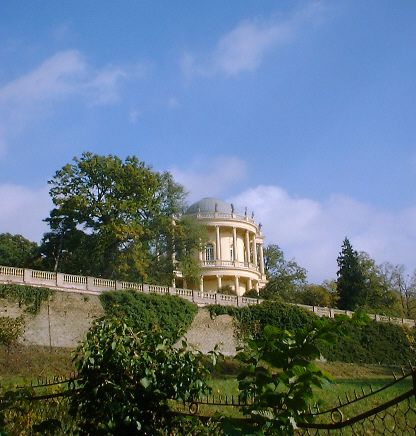
The Belvedere auf dem Klausberg

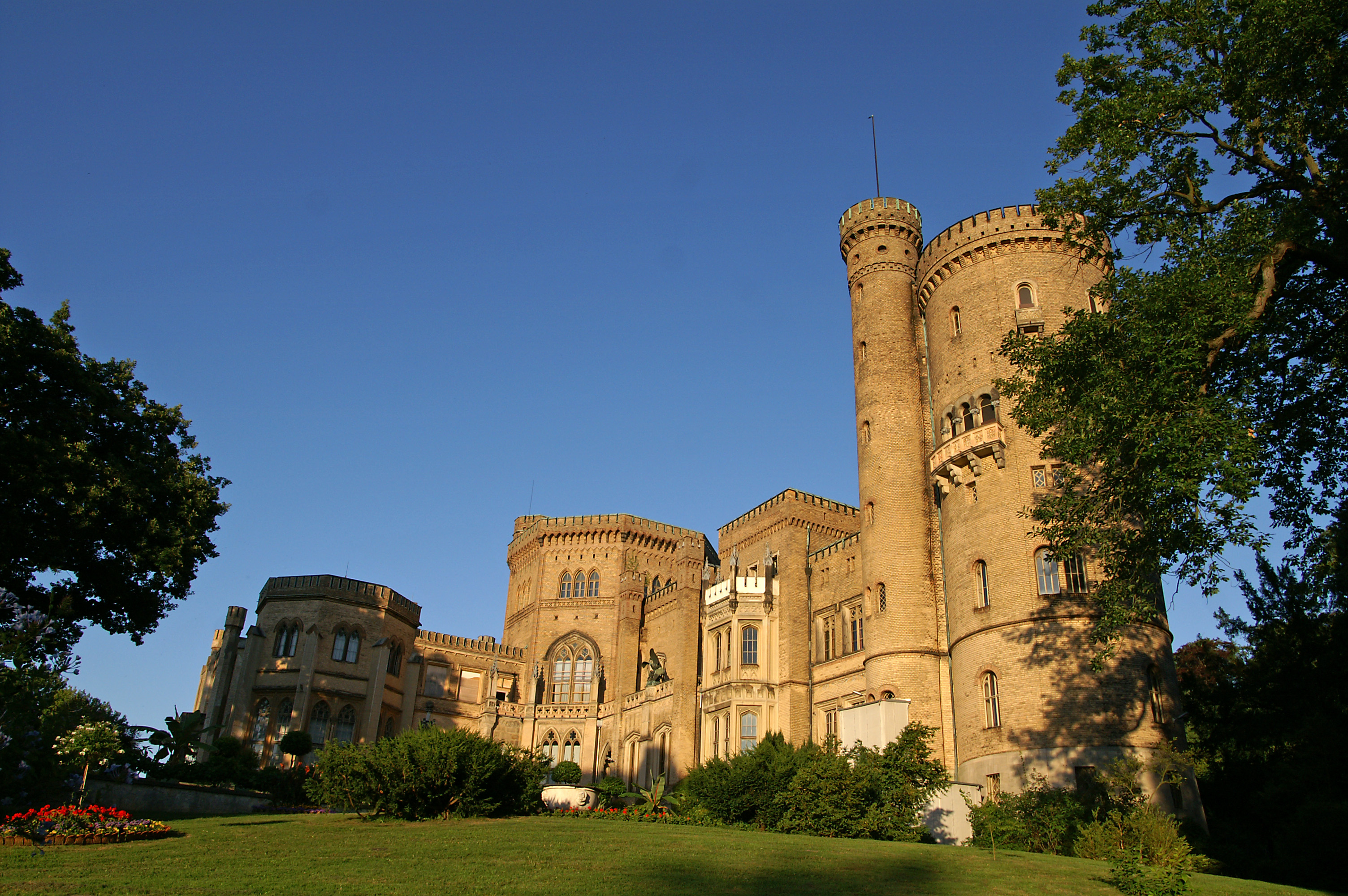
Babelsberg Palace

== Sports ==
- 1. FFC Turbine Potsdam, one of the most successful German female football clubs (Bundesliga (women))
- Potsdam Royals, American football team competing in the German Football League.
- SV Babelsberg 03, football club Regionalliga Nordost
- Olympic Training Centre Potsdam
- USV Potsdam, rugby union (2nd Rugby-Bundesliga) and football (Kreisklasse)
- List of football clubs in Potsdam
- The Potsdamer Schlössermarathon (Potsdam Palace Marathon) is a marathon in that is held annually in June. Thousands of runners run the course past the palaces for the half marathon and several hundred repeat the course to complete the full marathon.

== Notable people ==
18th century

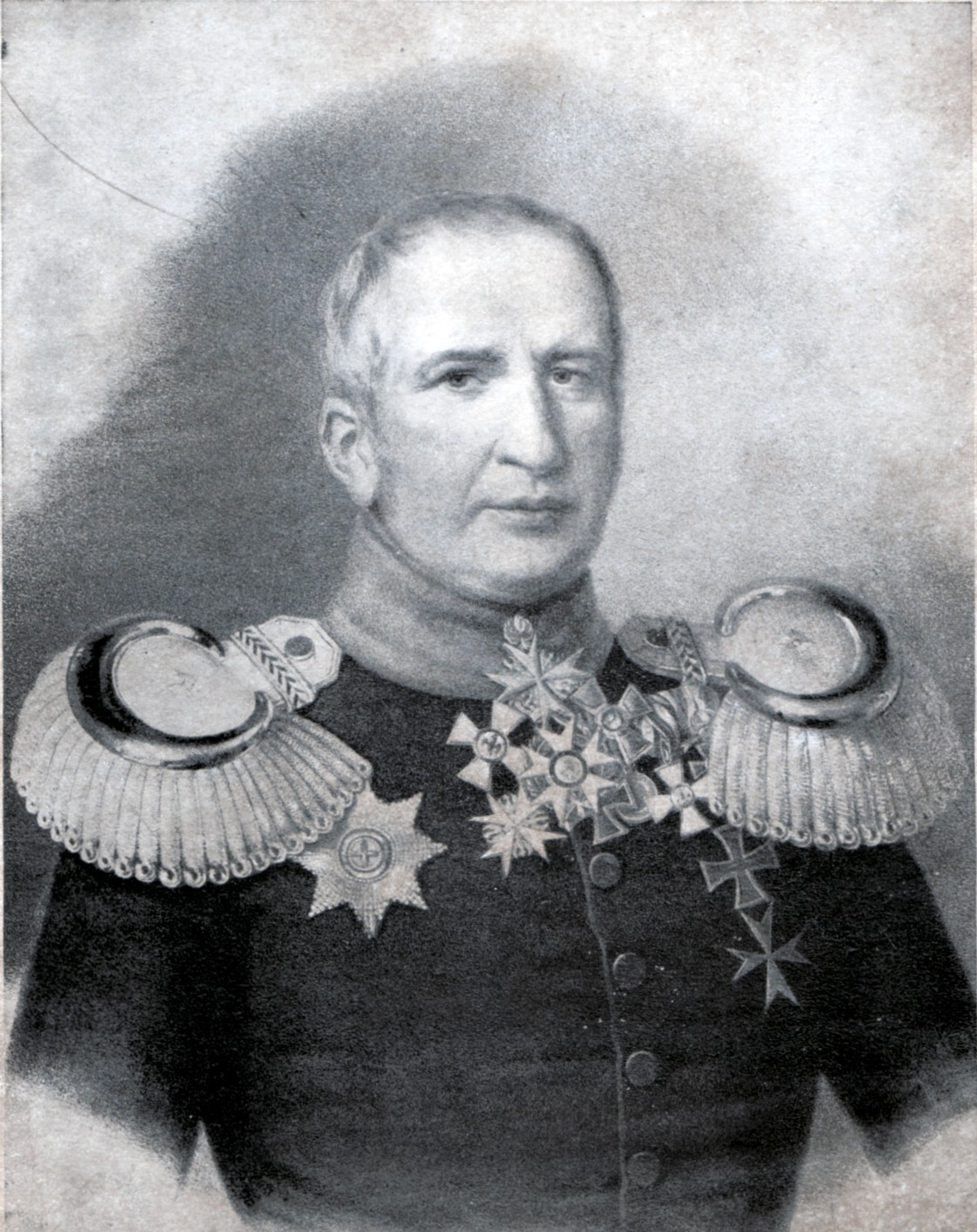
Graf Henckel von Donnersmarck

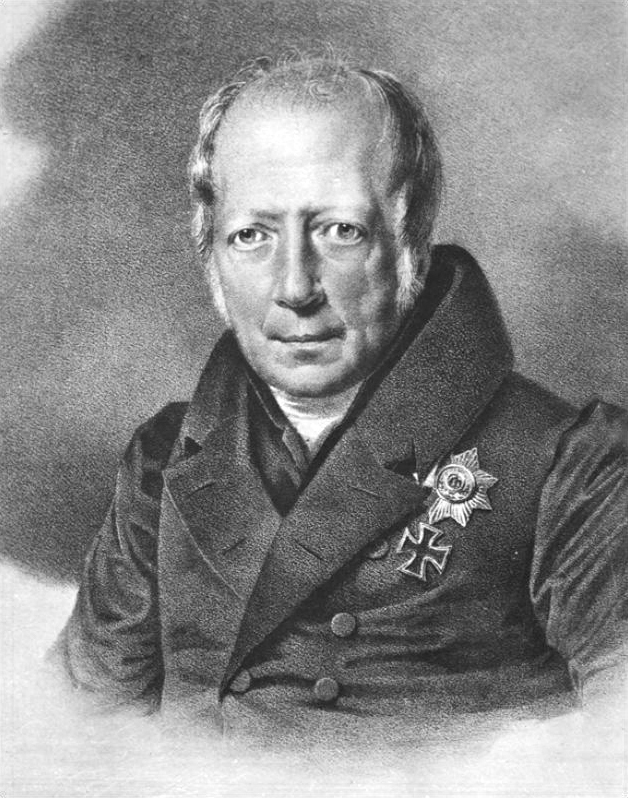
Wilhelm von Humboldt

- Abraham Abramson (1754–1811), medalist
- Ludwig Yorck von Wartenburg (1759–1830), Prussian field marshal
- Wilhelm von Humboldt (1767–1835), scholar and statesman, founder of the Berlin Humboldt University
- Frederick William III of Prussia (1770–1840), King of Prussia 1797–1840
- Wilhelm Ludwig Viktor Henckel von Donnersmarck (1775–1849), Prussian general lieutenant
- Eleonore Prochaska (1785–1813), woman soldier during the liberation war, unrecognized as a man disguised as a drummer, later as an infantryman in the Prussian army against Napoleon
- Friedrich Wilhelm von Rauch (1790–1850), lieutenant general in the Prussian Army
- Heinrich Wilhelm Krausnick (1797–1882), lawyer and Lord Mayor of Berlin

19th century

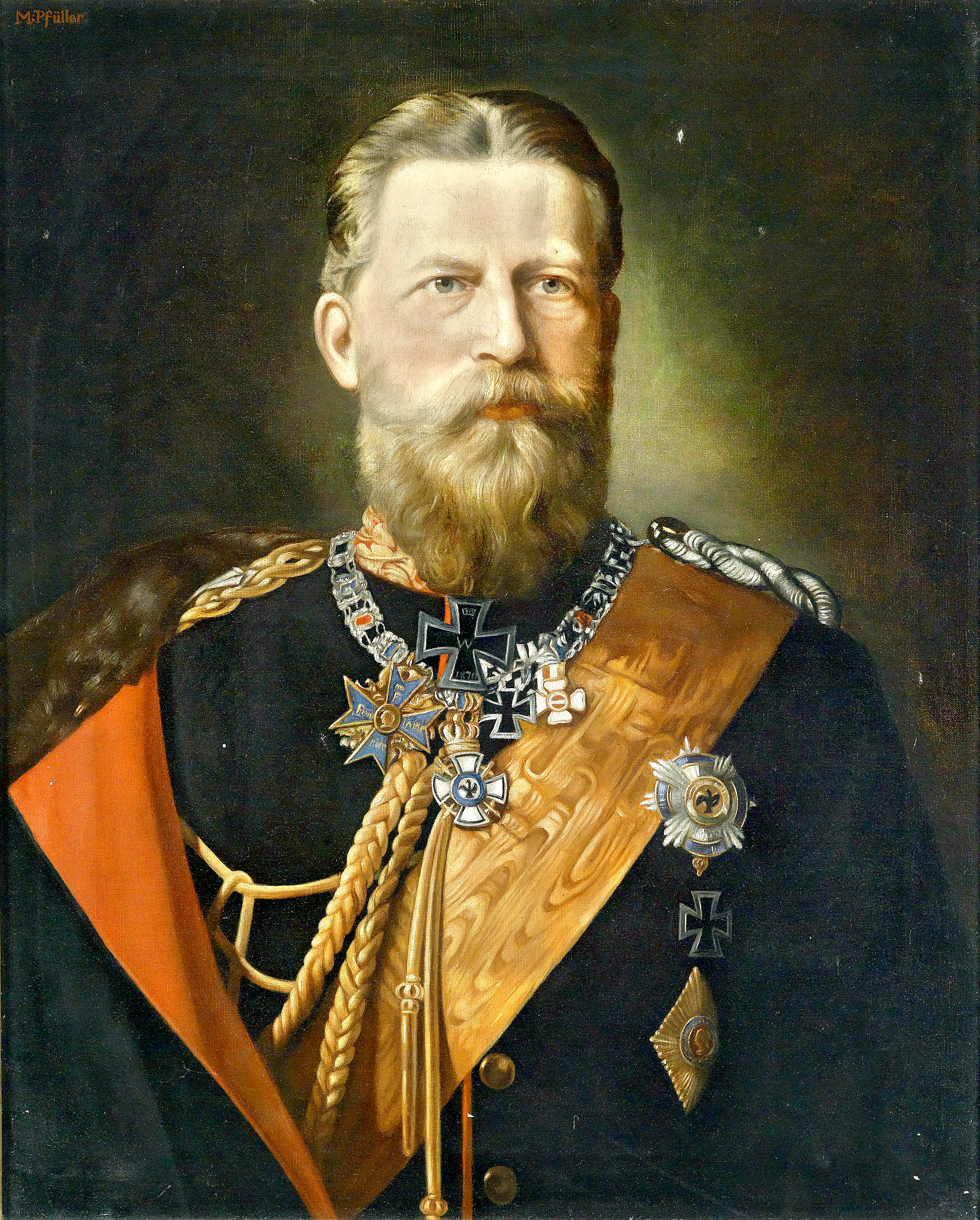
Frederick III

- Moritz Hermann von Jacobi (1801–1874), physicist and engineer
- Ludwig Persius (1803–1845), architect
- Carl Gustav Jacob Jacobi (1804–1851), mathematician
- Adolf von Rauch (1805–1877), Prussian cavalry officer
- Philipp Galen (1813–1899), writer and physician
- Julius Lange (1815–1905), numismatist
- Hermann von Helmholtz (1821–1894), physiologist and physicist, one of the most important natural scientists of his time
- Alfred Bonaventura von Rauch (1824–1900), Prussian general
- Friedrich Wilhelm von Rauch (1827–1907), Prussian general leutnant
- Egmont von Rauch (1829–1875), Prussian cavalry officer and later colonel in the Prussian Army
- Frederick III, German Emperor (1831–1888), Emperor of the German Empire and King of Prussia 1888
- Alfred von Waldersee (1832–1904), field marshal
- Ernst Haeckel (1834–1919), zoologist, philosopher
- Gottlieb Graf von Haeseler (1836–1919), Prussian field marshal
- Hermann Schubert (1848–1911), mathematician
- Castor Watt (1858-1932), German actor, humorist, imitator and internationally known quick-change artist
- Wilhelm II, German Emperor (1859–1941), Emperor of the German Empire and King of Prussia 1888–1918
- Friedrich Adolf Steinhausen (1859−1910), doctor and physiologist
- Friedrich Wilhelm von Rauch (1868–1899), Prussian officer
- Friedrich Ludwig (1872–1930), music historian and rector of the University of Göttingen
- Friedrich Wilhelm von Bissing (1873–1956), egyptologist
- Elisabeth von Knobelsdorff (1877–1959), engineer and architect
- Prince Eitel Friedrich of Prussia (1883–1942), second son of King William II of Prussia
- Ludowika Jakobsson (1884–1968), German-Finnish figure skater
- Leo Geyr von Schweppenburg (1886–1974), general of tank troops and military attachée
- Luise Schulze-Berghof (1889–1970), German composer and pianist
- Hans-Karl Freiherr von Esebeck (1892–1955), general
- Paul Blobel (1894–1951), Nazi war criminal, hanged for war crimes
- Hans-Karl Koch (1897–1934), SA general killed in the Night of the Long Knives
- Hasso von Manteuffel (1897–1978), General in the Wehrmacht, and later spokesman for defense of the Free Democratic Party in the Bundestag

20th century

- Margarete Buber-Neumann (1901–1989), writer
- Egon Eiermann (1904–1970), architect
- Louis Ferdinand of Prussia (1907–1994), German and Prussian heir to the throne and head of the House of Hohenzollern
- Marie Eleonore of Albania (1909–1957), princess
- Adam von Trott zu Solz (1909–1944), lawyer, diplomat and resistance fighter
- Carol Victor (1913–1973), Hereditary Prince of Albania
- Peter Weiss (1916–1982), writer, graphic artist and painter
- Hans Richter (1919–2008), actor
- Bernhard Hassenstein (1922–2016), biologist and behaviorist
- Burkhard Heim (1925–2001), theoretical physicist
- Günther Schramm (born 1929), actor
- Hilla Becher (1934–2015), photographer
- Nicole Heesters (born 1937), actress
- Klaus Katzur (1943–2016), swimmer and Olympic medalist
- Sabine Uecker (born 1943), politician
- Manfred Wolke (born 1943), boxer and boxing coach
- Wolfgang Joop (born 1944), fashion designer
- Oliver Bendt (born 1946), actor, gymnast, singer
- Christiane Lanzke (born 1947), diver and actress
- Lothar Doering (born 1950), handball player and coach
- Brigitte Ahrenholz (born 1952), rower
- Matthias Platzeck (born 1953), politician, Minister President of Brandenburg
- Klaus Thiele (born 1958), athlete
- Gabriele Berg (born 1963), biologist and biotechnologist
- Jens-Peter Berndt (born 1963), swimmer
- Ralf Brudel (born 1963), rower
- Birgit Peter (born 1964), rower
- Carsten Wolf (born 1964), cyclist, world champion
- Daniela Neunast (born 1966), steward in rowing
- René Monse (born 1968), heavyweight boxer
- Klara Geywitz (born 1976), politician
- Aleksandr Sayenko (born 1978), footballer

21st century

- Margarita Kolosov, rhythmic gymnast and 2024 Olympian
- Melissa Kössler (born 2000), footballer for the Germany national team
- Ermyas Mulugeta, assaulted in a nationally significant case

=== Honorary citizens ===
- 1845: Wilhelm Ludwig Viktor Henckel von Donnersmarck, Lieutenant General
- 1856: Friedrich von Wrangel, Field Marshal
- 1863: Peter Joseph Lenné, gardener and landscape architect
- 1891: Hermann von Helmholtz, naturalist
- 1905: Theobald von Bethmann Hollweg, president of the province of Brandenburg
- 1933: Paul von Hindenburg, Fieldmarshal and Reichspräsident (withdrawn 12 December 2021 by decision of the Potsdam City Council)
- 1933: Adolf Hitler, chancellor (withdrawn 15 August 1990 by decision of the Potsdam City Council)
- 1938: Josef Goebbels, Minister of Propaganda (withdrawn 3 November 2021 by decision of the Potsdam City Council)
- 1955: Max Volmer, physical chemist
- 1960: Hans Marchwitza, writer and proletarian poet
- 1965: Otto Nagel, painter

== See also ==
- Mostar Friedensprojekt

== Sources ==
- Paul Sigel, Silke Dähmlow, Frank Seehausen und Lucas Elmenhorst, Architekturführer Potsdam Architectural Guide, Dietrich Reimer Verlag, Berlin 2006, ISBN 3-496-01325-7.
