= Julius Lange (numismatist) =

German numismatist

Julius Lange (1815–1905) was a German numismatist. He is honoured with a commemorative plaque in the city of Potsdam.

== Life ==
Lange was born in Potsdam. He was a butcher and worked at the shop his father had bought in 1810 at Brandenburger Straße 29, which now bears his commemorative plaque. He was keenly interested in coinage, and the recovery and description of ancient finds. In 1880 he helped in the rescue of a major coin find - about 2000 coins found in a field in Michendorf. Some pieces from his own collection are now in the Potsdam Museum.

== Publications ==
- Die Potsdamer Kirchen- und Innungs-Siegel, in MVGP. - N. F. Bd. 6, Teil 1, Nr. 218
- August Friedrich Eisenhart. (Ein Lebensbild), in MVGP. - N. F. Bd. 6, Teil 1, Nr. 229
- Das Vorwerk Gallin. Zur Geschichte des Potsdamer Schlächtergewerkes, in MVGP. - N. F. Bd. 6, Teil 1, Nr. 246
- Beiträge zur Geschichte des Potsdamer Mühlenwesens, in MVGP. - N. F. Bd. 7, Teil 2, Nr. 269, 1878
- Die Potsdamer Amts-Meyerei, in MVGP.- N. F. Bd. 8, Teil 3, Nr. 272, 1883
