= Mostar Friedensprojekt =

Mostar Friedensprojekt e.V. (English: Mostar peace project) is, since 1994, a registered non-governmental, non-profit organization with charitable commitments in the state of Brandenburg, located in the city center of Potsdam. The association organizes socio-cultural activities, artistic and cultural events and cultural publications at the local, regional and national level. It offers information, general support, advice, logistic and humanitarian aid, job qualifications and consultancy to refugees and asylum seekers in the region of Brandenburg and Berlin. Mostar Friedensproject is constantly coordinating and leading youth exchanges, European Voluntary Service, trainings, conferences, events and other support facilities within the framework of the European program Youth, Grundtvig, Europe for Citizen and LiFelong Learning. The association has the partners in many European countries, particularly in the Western Balkan, East Europe and the Caucasus.

== Aims and objectives ==
The most important aims and objectives of Mostar Friedensprojekt is to encourage and promote young people to take part in active involvement in the democratically fight against racism and xenophobia, all kind of prejudices and social exclusion in Germany and in Europe. and inter-cultural learning in Europe. The association develops new forms and methods of inter-cultural learning for political-social-cultural issues. It promotes tolerance, understanding of the diversity of culture and social behaviours, political education at the local and regional level, in Brandenburg and Berlin. One of the most important aims of Mostar Friedensprojekt is to invite to discuss the totalitarianism in Europe in the twentieth century. The conferences are focused on “European memory / remembrance culture(s)” and they are concerning the remembrance of victims of National Socialism and Stalinism, and how the European national states are dealing with the past.

== Activities ==
Mostar Friedensprojekt established and ran several important projects in Bosnia-Herzegovina. It has created a centre for culture and education in the city Mostar, which supports neighbourly attitudes, cooperates with the local culture and subculture, and also international partnership associations from South and Eastern Europe. In addition, it has sub-conducted the "Orthopedic Workshop2 in Ključ, western Bosnia. Their function is to manufacture prosthesis and orthotics for land mine victims and disabled persons. Mostar Friedensprojekt took part in establishing and supporting the “Mother-Child-Centre” in Sanski Most, where daily medical advice and care is given to young mothers and their children. With partners from Bosnia-Herzegovina the association set up an impermanent Bosnian language school.

Mostar Friedensprojekt consulted and advised former Yugoslavian refugees for their voluntary return from the State of Brandenburg in Germany to Bosnia and Herzegovina. In cooperation with other organizations, it has promoted the voluntary repatriation of small entrepreneurs and similarly skilled people and it arranged multiple training courses for development projects attended by refugees living in the State of Brandenburg. The association informs refugees, asylum seekers, immigrants and their children about possibilities of education, qualification and counselling.

Mostar Friedensprojekt has been participating in educational initiative programmes as SOCRATES and Grundtvig. In this framework it conducted in 2005/2006 in Germany the Lingua project “Glossomuseum”. This project focuses on the languages of the European Union in elementary schools. Mostar Friedensprojekt has also implemented in Germany the project “The elder I become, the more I want to know” within institutions and organizations for elderly people about the history of the EU and the impacts of the last EU enlargement in 2004. It ran a PHARE Small Projects Program with a European conference about the free movement of persons in the EU-25, titled “Working, Learning, Living” in which experts from labor agencies and EURES-offices, ministries, trade unions, chamber of commerce and employee organizations as well as qualification institutions took part.

Mostar Friedensprojekt encourages youth initiatives and works with European voluntary service. It organises trainings and has partnerships with European countries, such as the Balkans, East European and Caucasian states, within the framework of the European program Youth, Grundtvig, Europe for Citizen and LiFelong Learning. The association regularly organizes conferences and discussions of political education. These events cover a wide range of themes, for example: political information about European Union, Eastern Europe, migration and immigration policy, social security systems, employment, and the transformation process in Europe 1989.
