= Jagdschloss Glienicke =

UNESCO World Heritage Site
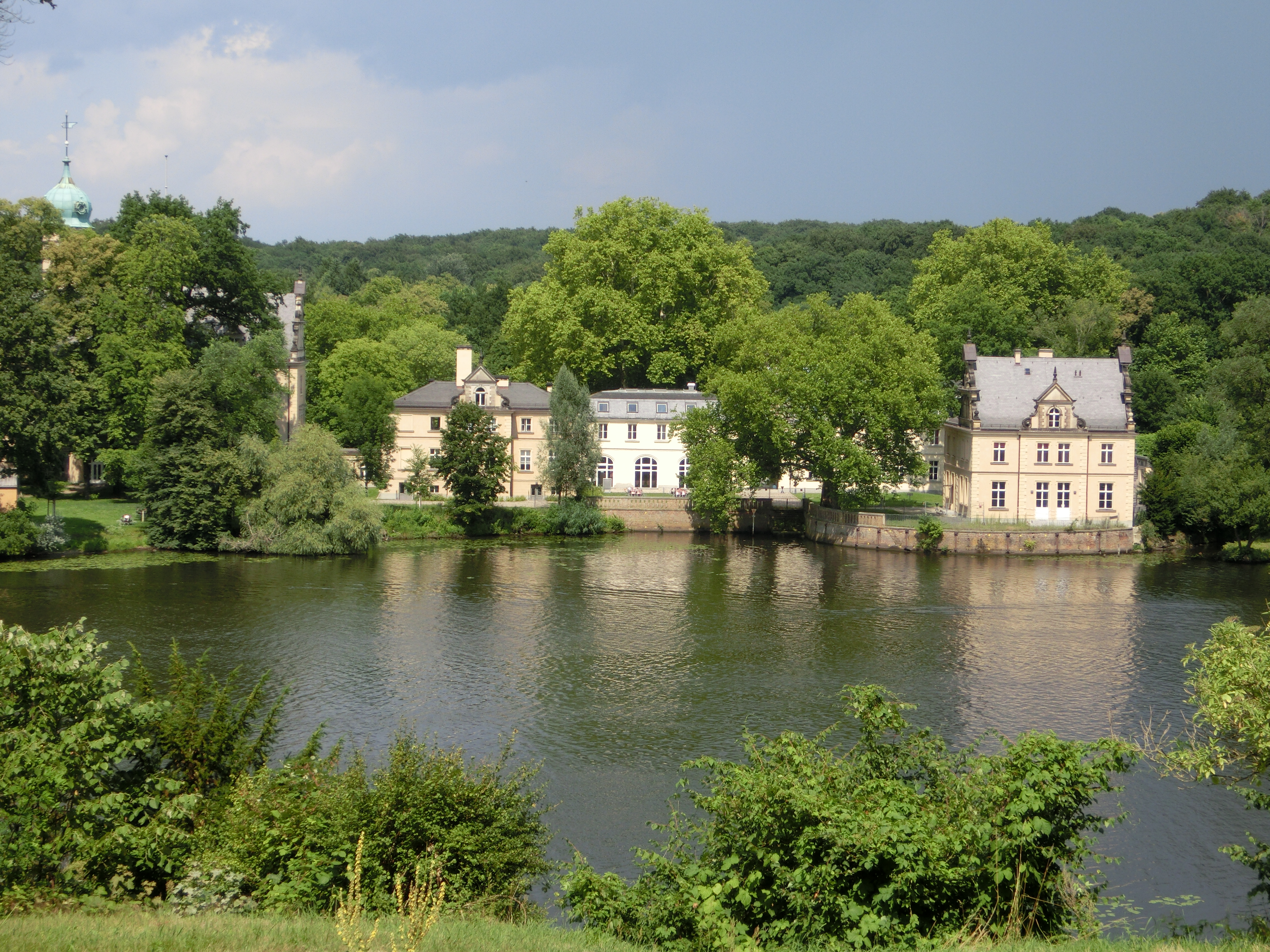

- Location within Berlin Location within Germany
- Location: Wannsee, Steglitz-Zehlendorf, Berlin, Germany
- Part of: Palaces and Parks of Potsdam and Berlin
- Criteria: Cultural: (i)(ii)(iv)
- Reference: 532ter
- Inscription: 1990 (14th Session)
- Coordinates: 52°24′40″N 13°05′56″E

Jagdschloss Glienicke (German pronunciation: [ˈjaːktˌʃlɔs ˈɡliːnɪkə]) is a hunting lodge in the Berlin district of Wannsee near Glienicke Bridge. Babelsberg and Glienicke Palace can be seen nearby. Originally constructed in the late 17th century and expanded in the mid-1800s, the castle is part of the Palaces and Parks of Potsdam and Berlin UNESCO World Heritage Site, owing to its cohesion with the surrounding landscape and its testimony to the power of Prussia in the 17-19th centuries.

== History ==
The construction of a small lodge was begun in 1682-84 under the "Great Elector" Frederick William of Brandenburg, together with a cavalier house and stables, possibly according to plans designed by Charles Philippe Dieussart. The castle grounds were completed in 1693 during the reign of his successor Frederick III. When Elector Frederick rose to a King in Prussia in 1701, he had the castle lavishly rebuilt in a Baroque style. King Frederick William I of Prussia used it as a military hospital. In 1763, King Frederick the Great gave it as a present to Isaac Levin Joel, a wallpaper and carpet maker who used it for wallpaper manufacture. From 1827, it was owned by the civil servant and pedagogue Wilhelm von Türk, who turned it into an orphanage in 1832.

In 1859, the lodge was acquired by Prince Charles of Prussia, who hired the court architect Ferdinand von Arnim to renovate the castle in Neo-baroque style for his son Prince Frederick Charles. He also had an English landscape garden laid out, probably assisted by Peter Joseph Lenne. In 1889-92, Frederick Charles' son and heir Prince Friedrich Leopold of Prussia had the castle again rebuilt in the style of historicism by architect Albert Geyer, who expanded the central block of the building and added a tower.

In 1939, the castle came into possession of the city of Berlin and was used as a storing location for Universum Film AG. After World War II, the castle first housed a cadet school of the Soviet army; in 1947 it became a youth hostel. Additionally, many families found a new home there after the Russians cleared out Berlin and Neubabelsberg. One of the families was the family of an ex-mayor of Berlin. Castle and park also served as a film backdrop, e.g. for Mädchen in Uniform starring Romy Schneider in 1958.

From 1961, the castle was located immediately adjacent to the Berlin Wall. In 1962-64, Max Taut rebuilt the castle by adding a glass bay to the two lower floors. Between 1964 and 2003, the castle was used as a youth meeting place. Since 2003, the castle is home of the Sozialpädagogische Fortbildung Jagdschloss Glienicke.

On March 31, 2003, the south wing of the castle caught fire as a result of faulty wiring. Because the castle had no fire alarm and its water intakes had become clogged with silt, the resulting damage was particularly severe and has yet to be fully repaired. A rebuild in line with accepted conservation practice began in November 2005. The topping-out ceremony was on August 23, 2006. The awarding authority was the Senate Office For Education, Science and Research. The price for the rebuilding of the roof was approximately €400,000.

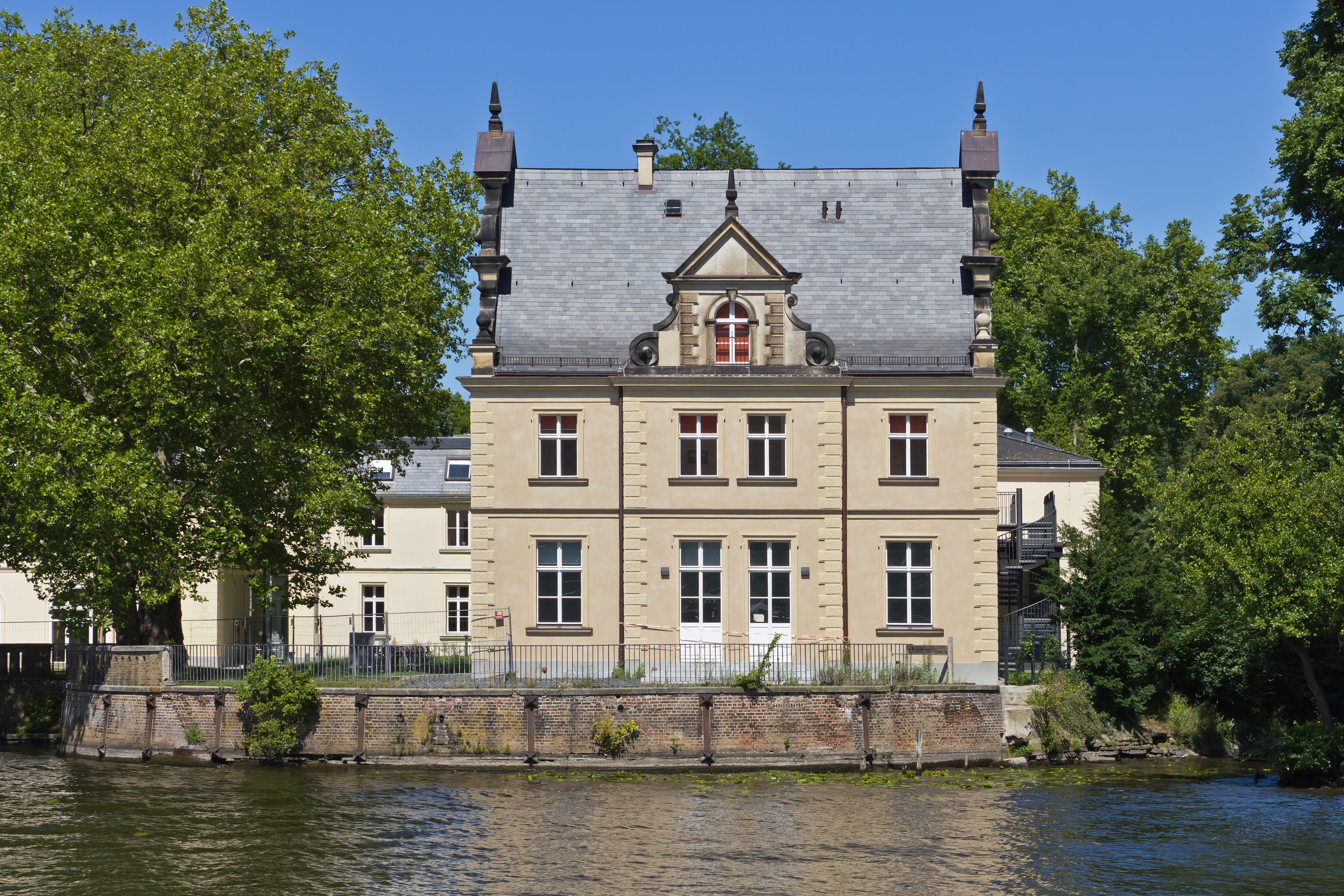

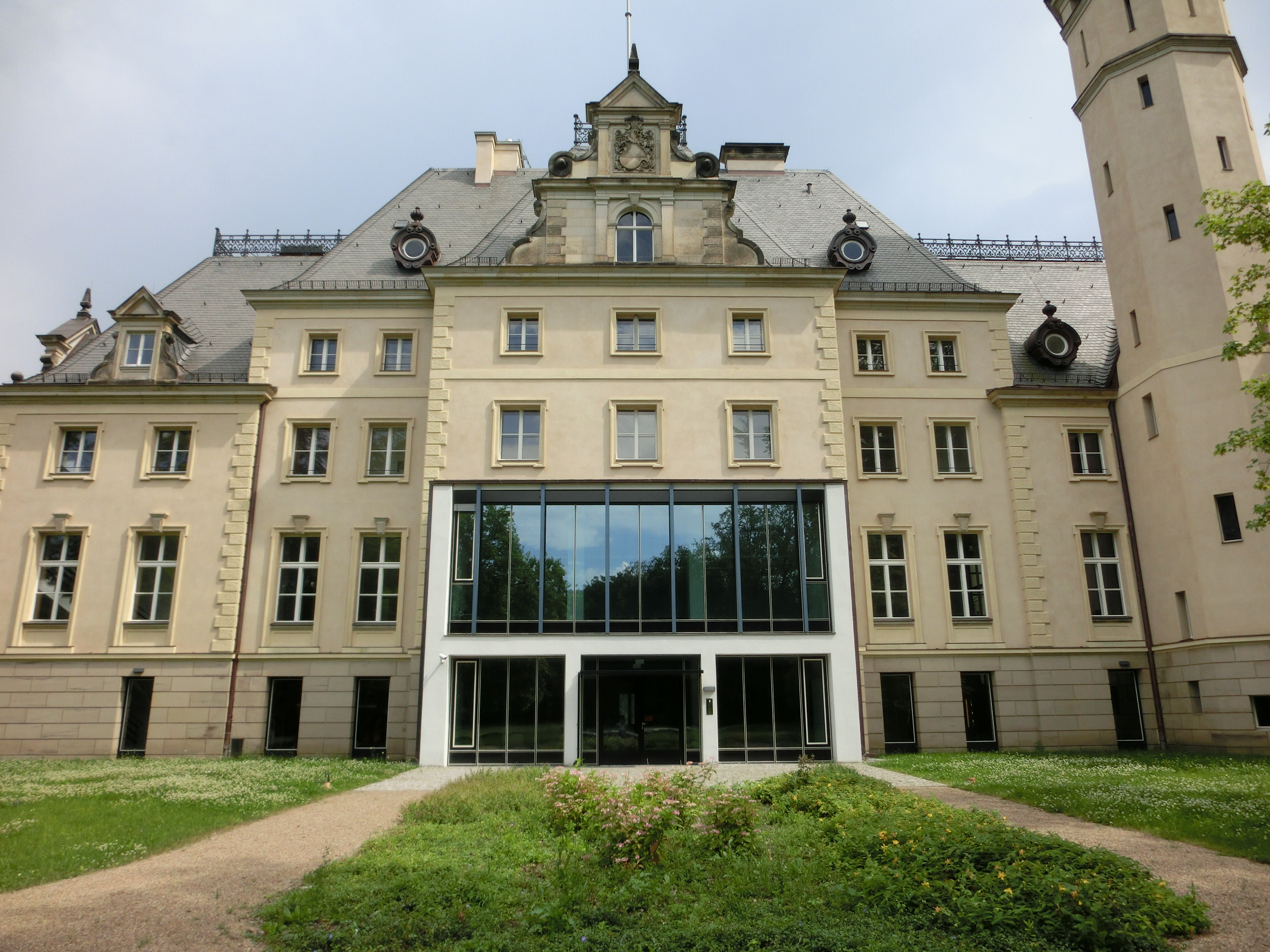
Jagdschloss Glienicke in 2014

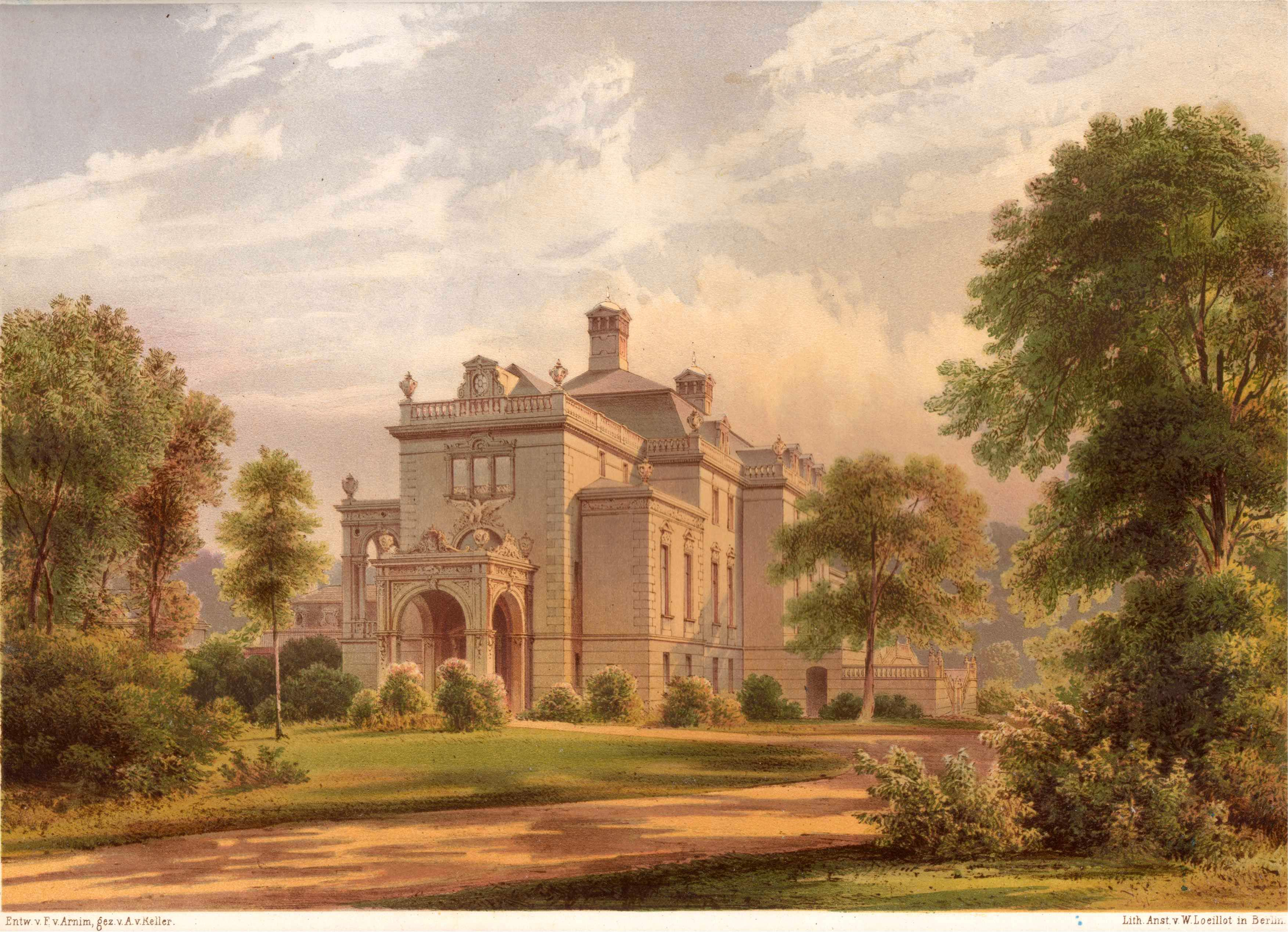
Jagdschloss Glienicke after remodeling by Ferdinand von Arnim, around 1865
