= Castle Ten Berghe =

Castle in Belgium

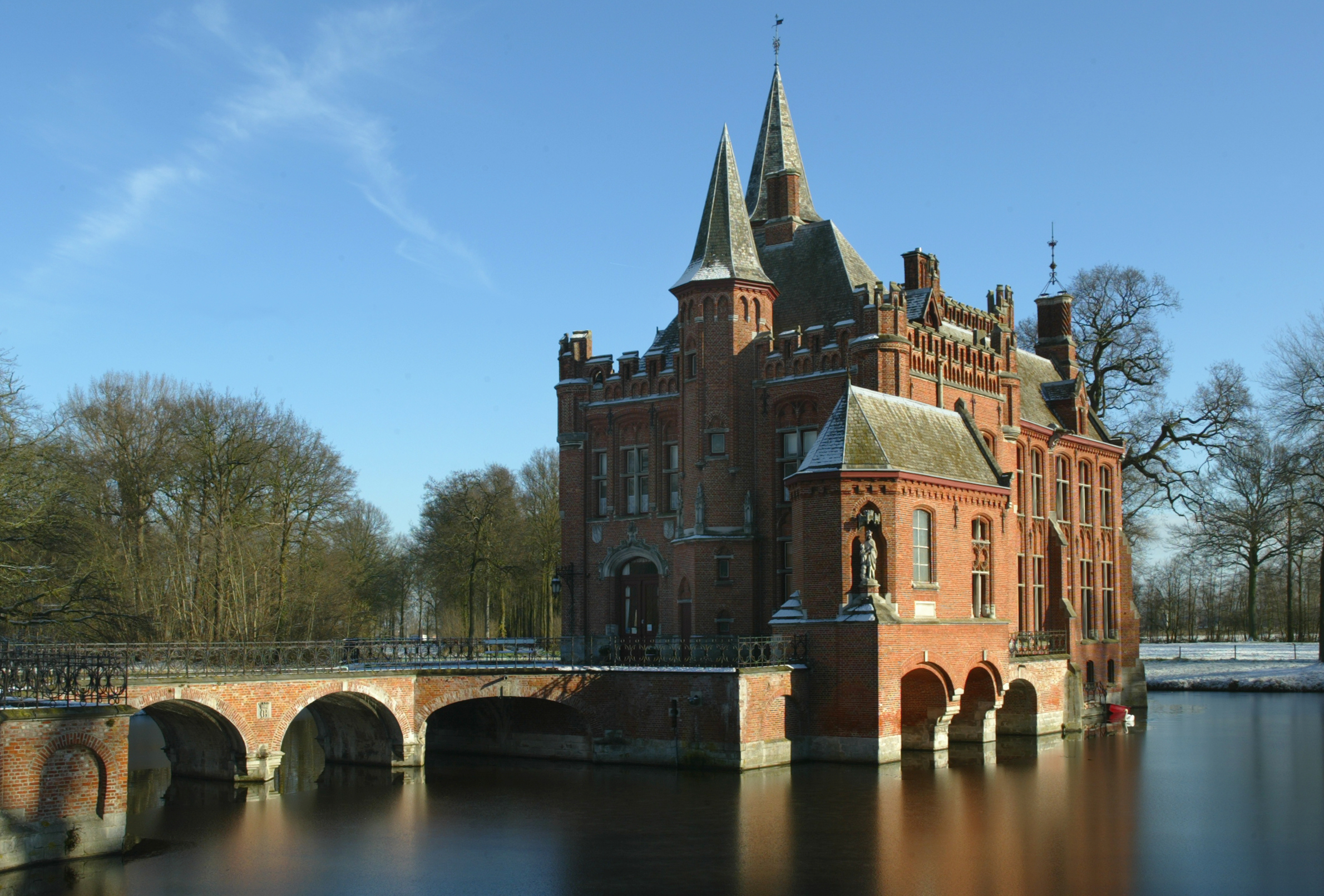

- Location of the tower in Belgium
- 51°14′25″N 3°13′37″E
- Type: Manor house
- Location: Near Bruges, West Flanders

History
- Built: pre-1267 (original); 1490 (rebuilt)

Site notes
- Architect: Joseph Schadde
- Architectural style: Neo-Gothic
- Restored: 1877
- Current use: Bed and breakfast

Castle Ten Berghe is a castle near Bruges, Belgium. A manor house on the site was mentioned in a charter of 1267; that building was destroyed in 1490, but rebuilt shortly afterwards. Work was performed in the late nineteenth century to expand and renovate the building, resulting in its current neo-Gothic appearance. Further renovation was performed in the early twenty-first century to prepare it for its current use as a bed and breakfast.

The castle is located at Dudzeelse Steenweg 311-313, 8000 Brugge, West-Vlaanderen.

== History ==
A manor house on the site was first mentioned in a charter of 1267. It was originally used as a manor and fief estate for the Count of Flanders at that time. In 1390 it was sold by Jonkheer Jan Walhier to the Van Rooden family, who retained it until 1482 when it was purchased by Cornelis Despaers.

On 7 October 1490, the castle was captured and burned by forces acting on behalf of Engelbert II of Nassau. Jacques Despaers, who owned the castle at the time, had it rebuilt. Nicolas Despars, mayor of Bruges, died at the castle in 1597. In 1610 it passed through an inheritance to the de Croeser de Berges family, who retained it until the early nineteenth century, then it was passed to the Caloen de Basseghem family, who still own it as of 2022.

In 1877, the castle was enlarged and remodelled by the architect Joseph Schadde; its current neo-Gothic appearance is a result of this renovation work. Over the course of the 1880s, many of the castle's outbuildings, including the stables and coach house, were demolished and rebuilt, and work was carried out on the grounds, filling in a portion of the moat and creating a pleasure garden.

Between 2003 and 2004, more renovation work was carried out on the castle to convert it for commercial use as a bed and breakfast. It is still used for that purpose as of 2022.

In 2009, the castle was listed on the Flemish Inventory of Immovable Heritage as an example of established architectural heritage. In 2013, it was further designated a protected monument.

== Description ==
The castle and its outbuildings are constructed of orange brick. It is approached by an arch bridge with wrought-iron parapets which spans the moat. The main building has a crenellated parapet, and two narrow towers. On the right side of the front facade is a small chapel. The interior is decorated in a manner that incorporates elements of neo-Gothic and neo-Renaissance design.
