= Pleasure ground =

Section of a garden for use by the owner

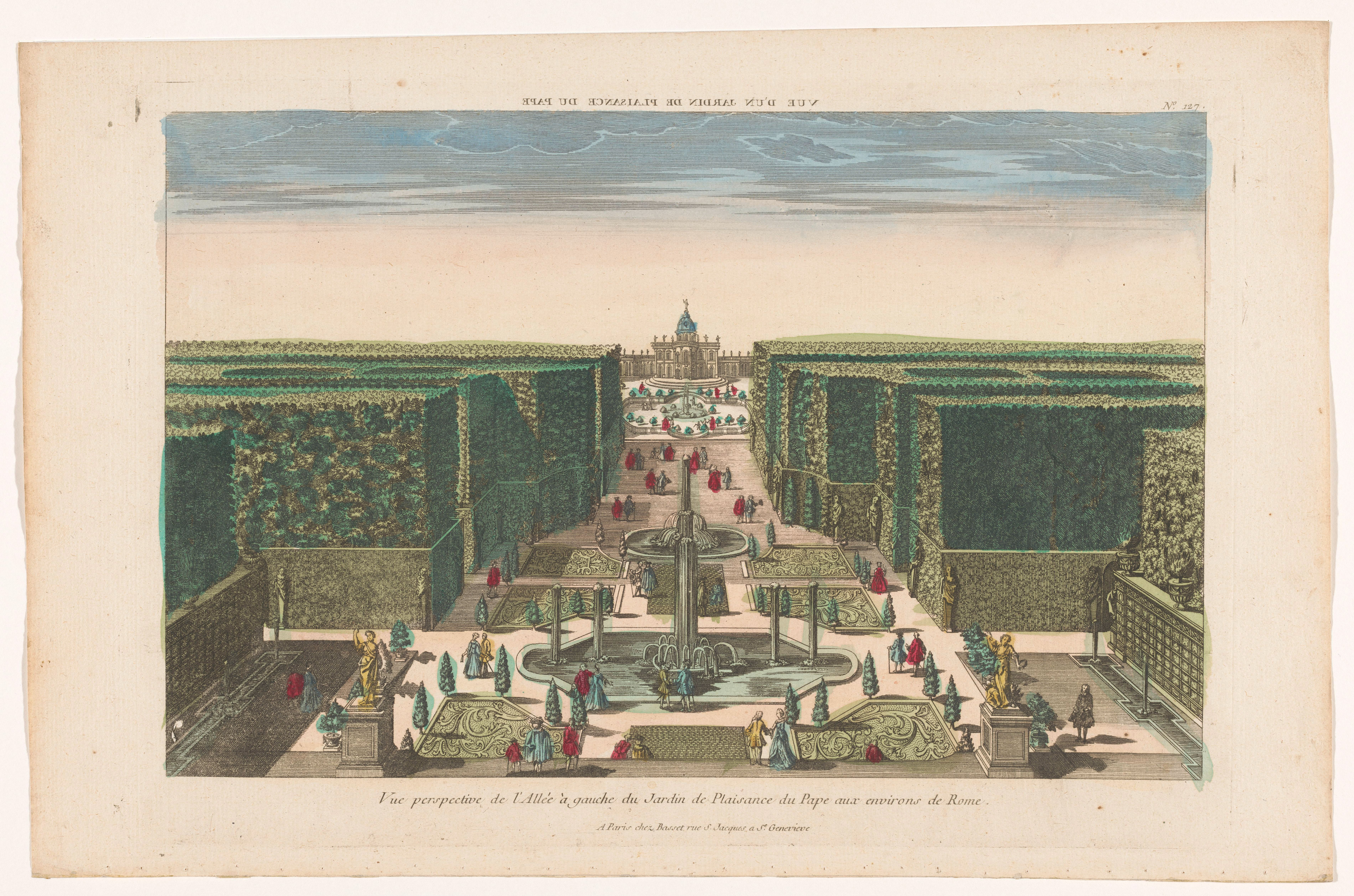
18th-century print of the Pope's jardin de plaisance outside Rome, in the French formal garden style

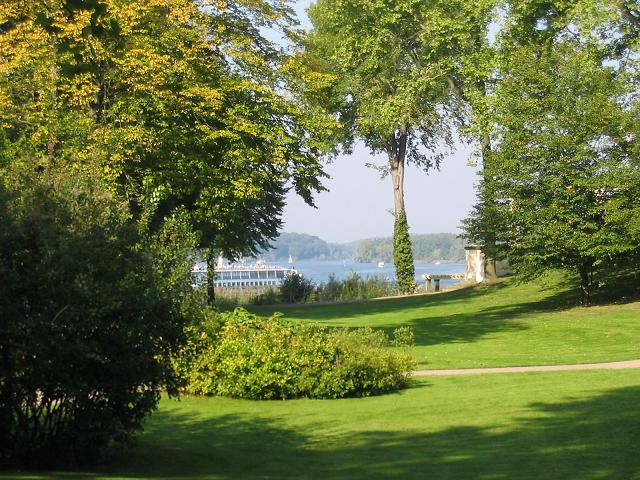
Reconstructed German pleasureground in Glienicke Park looking towards the Jungfernsee on the River Havel

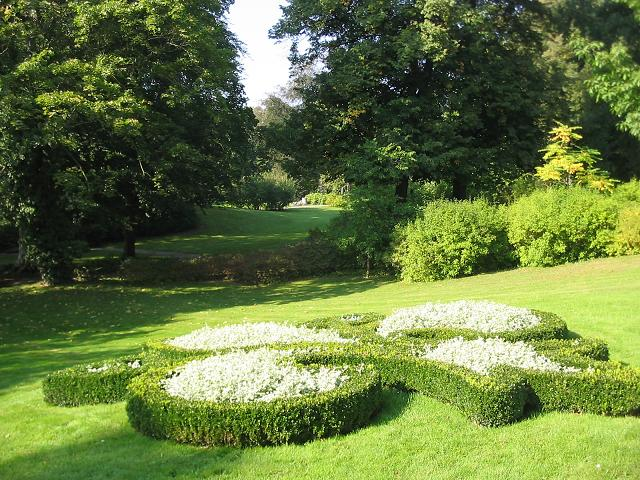
Flower bed in Glienicke pleasure ground

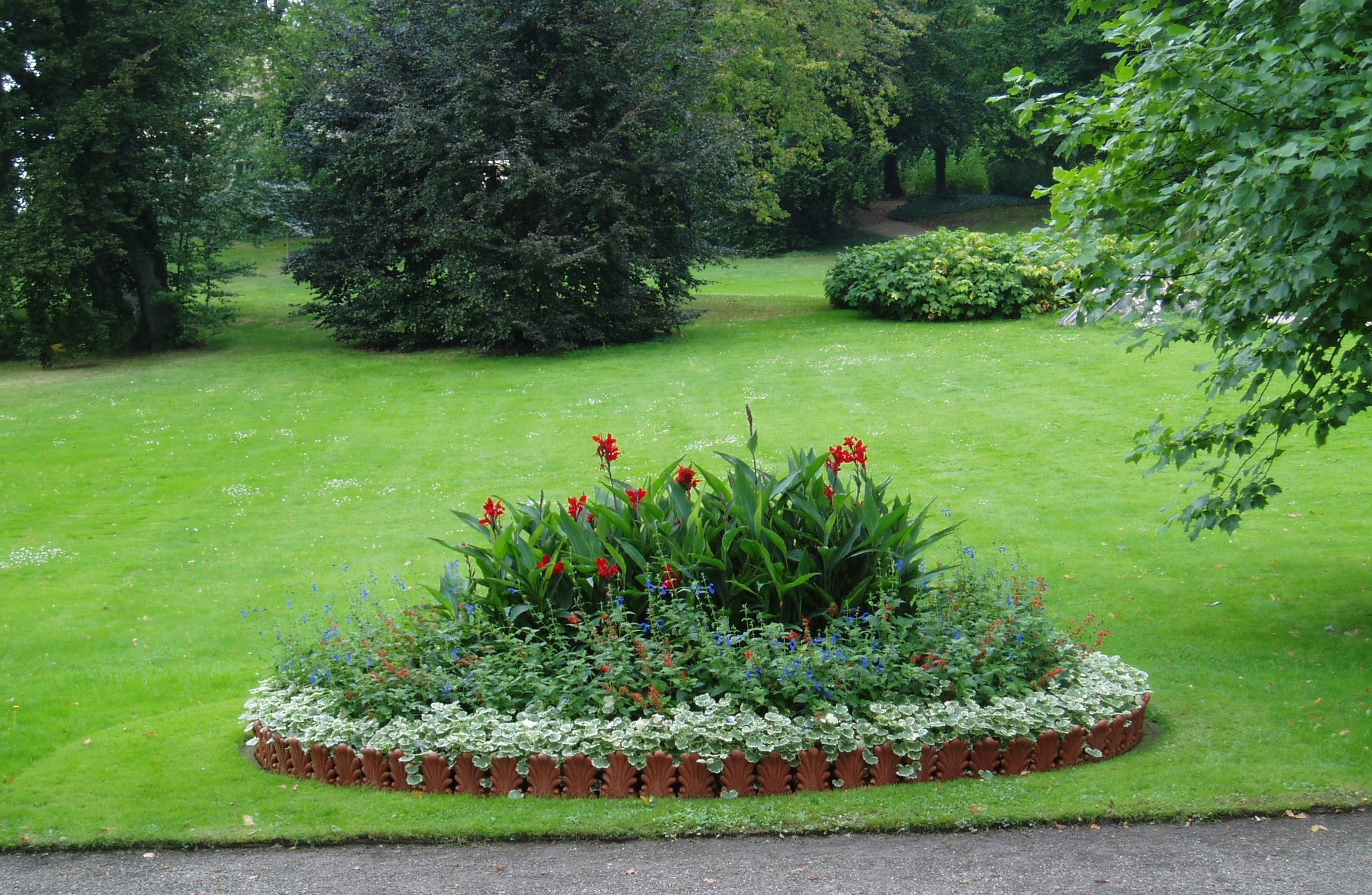
Flower basket with flower bed edgings of terracotta

In English gardening history, the pleasure ground or pleasure garden was the parts of a large garden designed for the use of the owners, as opposed to the kitchen garden and the wider park. It normally included flower gardens, typically directly outside the house, and areas of lawn, used for playing games (bowling grounds were very common, later croquet lawns), and perhaps "groves" or a wilderness for walking around. Smaller gardens were often or usually entirely arranged as pleasure grounds, as they still are, and as are modern public parks.

The concept survived a number of major shifts in the style of English gardens, from the Renaissance, through Baroque formal gardens, to the English landscape garden style. The pleasure grounds of English country house gardens have typically been remade a number of times, and awareness has recently returned that even the designs of the famous 18th-century landscapists such as Capability Brown originally included large areas of pleasure gardens, which unlike the landscaped parks, have rarely survived without major changes.

Pleasure garden more often had a different meaning, a public space of entertainment, though often charging for entry, for example Vauxhall Gardens in London. By 1847, "pleasure ground" had become the preferred American term for the private garden space after George William Johnson added it to his gardening dictionary. In German, the adopted and adapted term "Pleasureground" means an area in a park or large garden landscaped in the German idea of the English landscape garden style.

The English term "pleasure garden" was probably taken from the French jardin de plaisance, with the same meaning. This seems to go back at least to the end of the 15th century, as an important anthology of poetry (the first French one to be printed) published in Pais in the 1490s is called Le Jardin de plaisance et fleur de rhétorique (literally "The Garden of Pleasure and Flower of Rhetoric").

== History ==
The type of garden known as the pleasure ground in the shape of an ornamented area of lawn right next to the house was already known in England during the Renaissance, and continued to be an essential part of the garden. Encouraged by the landscape architect, Humphry Repton, this division of the grounds of a country house spread to Germany around 1800 and was employed inter alia by Prince Pückler-Muskau and Peter Joseph Lenné, who made use of it in their designs at Muskau, Glienicke and Babelsberg. The first pleasure ground in Prussia is probably that laid out at Glienicke Palace by Lenné in 1816.

Jane Austen makes use of the pleasure grounds in her 1814 novel Mansfield Park when describing a visit by the young people to Sotherton Court where the owner, James Rushworth plans to hire Repton to make further improvements.

== A German description ==
The German landscape gardener, Hermann, Prince of Pückler-Muskau, explained the meaning of this term in his 1834 publication Andeutungen über Landschaftsgärtnerei ("Ideas On Landscape Gardening") as follows:

"The word pleasure ground is difficult enough to render in German and I have therefore felt it better to retain the English expression. This means a piece of land adjacent to a house, which is fenced in and ornamented, of much greater extent than gardens, and something of an intermediate thing, a connecting element between the park and the actual gardens."
And further: "[...] if the park is an idealised, condensed piece of the natural world, so the pleasure garden is an extended residence [...] in this way [...] the suite of rooms, is continued on a larger scale in the open air, [...]

Pückler-Muskau's description refers to one of the three elements of the English landscape garden that are, from the outer perimeter of the estate to its main building, the park, the pleasure ground and the flower gardens. Usually there was also a flower-bedecked terrace on the house itself so that the transition from the open countryside to the house was in several stages.

== Form ==
The German pleasureground was an ornately designed garden area. It consisted of an ornamental lawn at several levels immediately next to the house. This lawn required a lot of maintenance, because the aim was to make the lawn appear like a "velvet carpet". The ornamentation included native and exotic plants that were laid out as flower carpets in various, mostly geometric, shapes and, according to Repton's advice, placed tastefully in the lawn, with round or oval flower baskets hanging mostly near the paths, as well as special individual shrubs and trees, statues, water features, small ponds or garden buildings. A fence separating the pleasure ground from the rest of the park area was intended, on the one hand, to make the separation between the idealized nature of the English landscape garden and the artistic design of the ornamental garden visible. On the other hand, the enclosure was made for pragmatic reasons, in order to keep grazing cattle or wild animals away from the ornamental garden. Around the outside of the pleasure ground, and sometimes partly through it, a winding system of paths – belt walks – led through an area formed by gentle hillocks with groups of shrubs and trees to various viewing points. These could be experienced at places along the walks and offer views of buildings and the surrounding landscape, which is set out as a backdrop.

== Sources ==
- Klaus-Henning von Krosigk, chapter about the pleasure ground in: Dieter Hennebo: Gartendenkmalpflege. Verlag Eugen Ulmer, Stuttgart 1985, p. 232–253.
- Klaus-Henning von Krosigk: Klein-Glienicke mit Pleasureground. In: Landesdenkmalamt Berlin (ed.): Gartenkunst Berlin. 20 Jahre Gartendenkmalpflege in der Metropole. Schlezky & Jeep, Berlin 1999
- Anne Schäfer: Der Pleasureground und die Sondergärten in Branitz. In: Kommunale Stiftung Fürst Pückler Museum – Park und Schloß Branitz (ed.): 150 Jahre Branitzer Park. Cottbus 1998, p. 90–99
