= Babelsberg Park =

UNESCO World Heritage Site
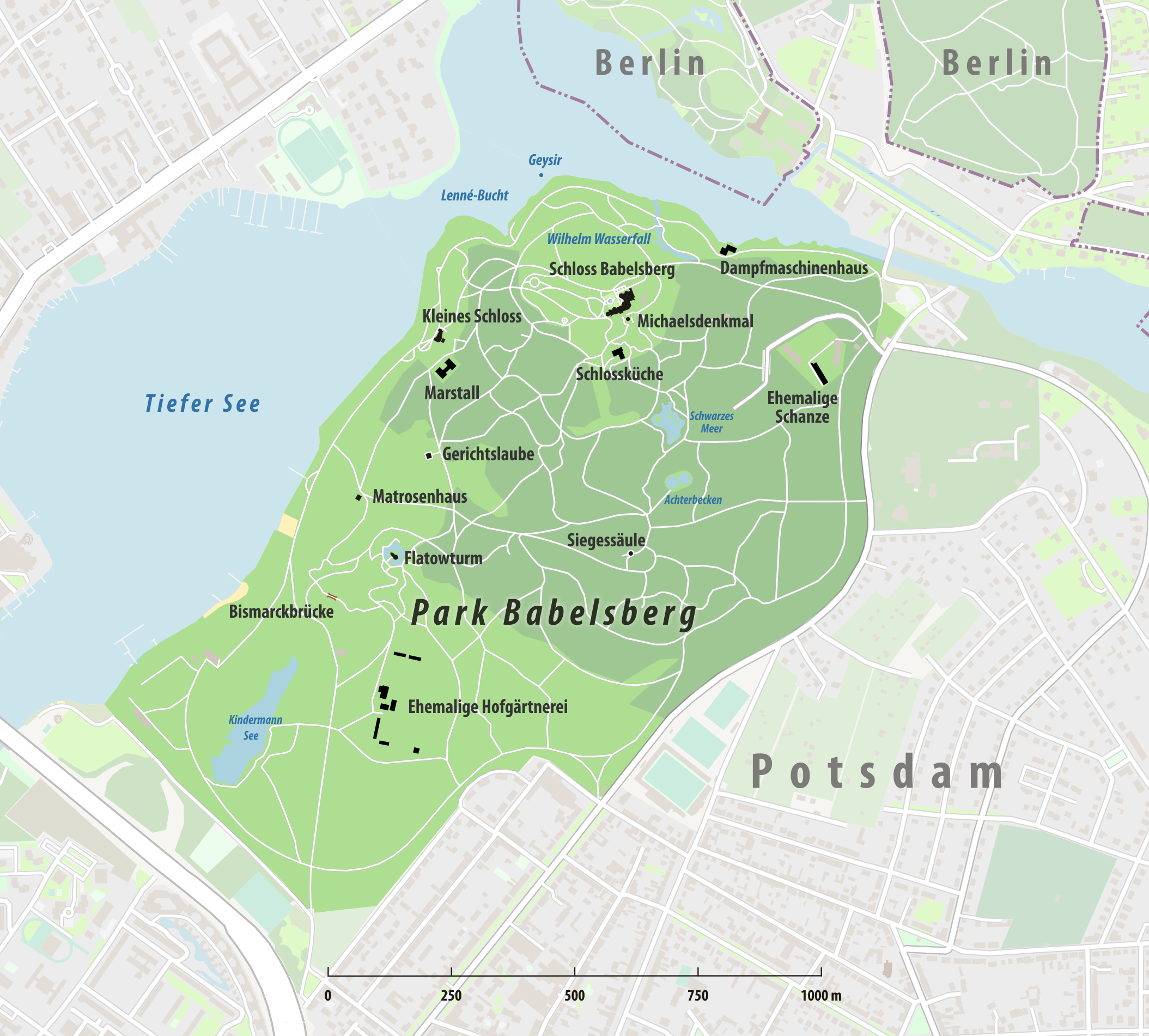
- Babelsberg Park

- Location within Brandenburg Location within Germany
- Location: Potsdam, Brandenburg, Germany
- Part of: Palaces and Parks of Potsdam and Berlin
- Criteria: Cultural: (i), (ii), (iv)
- Reference: 532ter
- Inscription: 1990 (14th Session)
- Extensions: 1992, 1999
- Coordinates: 52°24′19″N 13°05′34″E

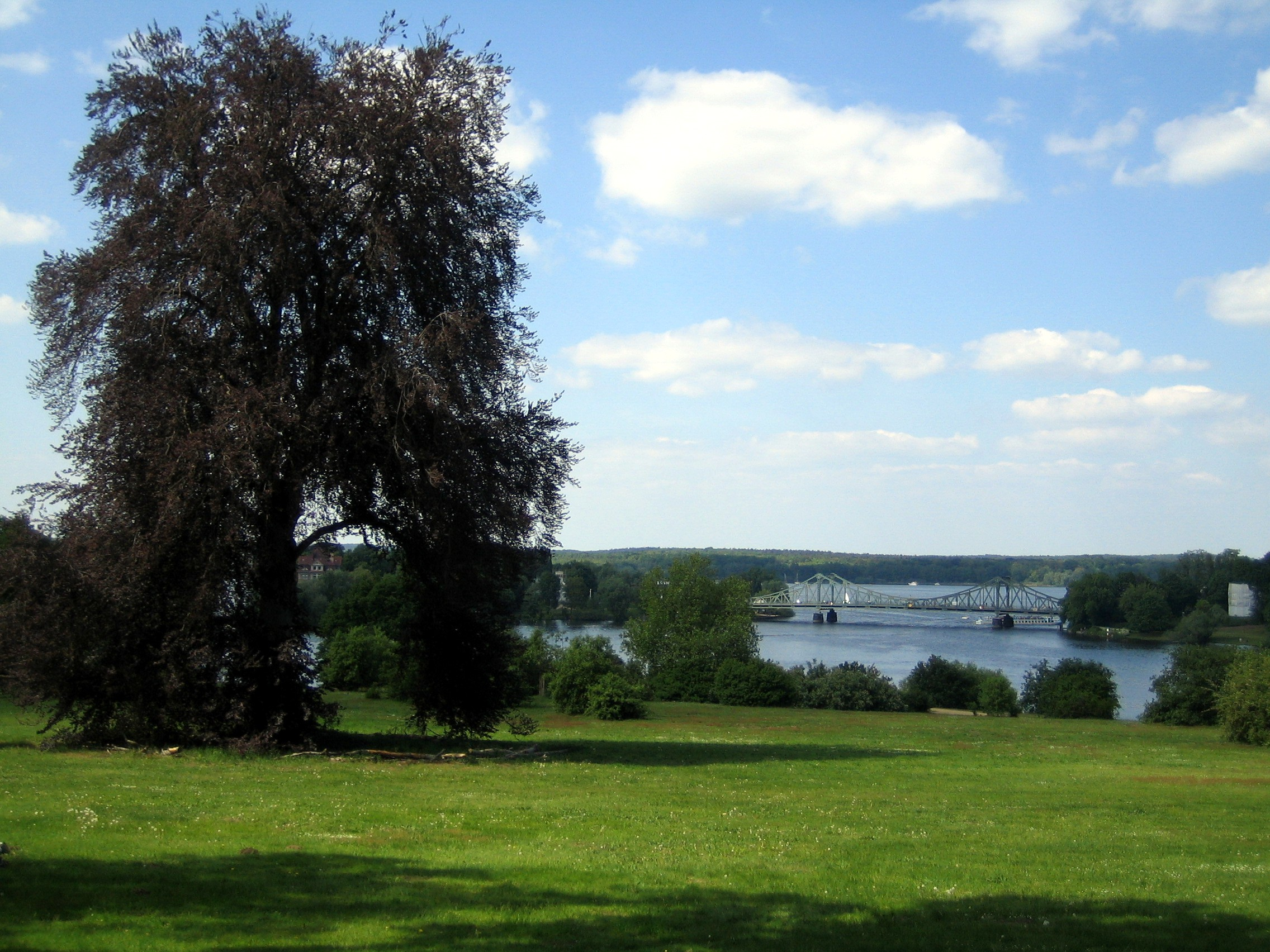
View from Babelsberg Palace to Glienicke Bridge

Babelsberg Park (German: Park Babelsberg) is a 114 hectare park in the northeast of the city of Potsdam, bordering on the Tiefen See lake on the River Havel. The park was first designed by the landscape artist Peter Joseph Lenné and, after him, by Prince Hermann von Pückler-Muskau and Karl Friedrich Schinkel, by order of the then-prince William I and his wife, Augusta. Located on a hill sloping down to the lake, the park and castle are part of the Palaces and Parks of Potsdam and Berlin, which were inscribed on the UNESCO World Heritage List because of their unique architecture and testimony to the development of landscape design.

== Park ==
After Glienicke Palace had been built for his brother Charles and Charlottenhof Palace for his brother Frederick William IV, Prince William also strove to have his own residence built. He received support for this idea from Lenné, who wanted to turn the area around Potsdam into an artistic synthesis and saw the opportunity of landscaping the eastern end of the area, the Babelsberg, into a park and to incorporate it into the overall plan.

In 1833 the thrifty King Frederick William III of Prussia gave his second son permission to lay out a garden and that same year Karl Friedrich Schinkel was given the contract to design a palace.

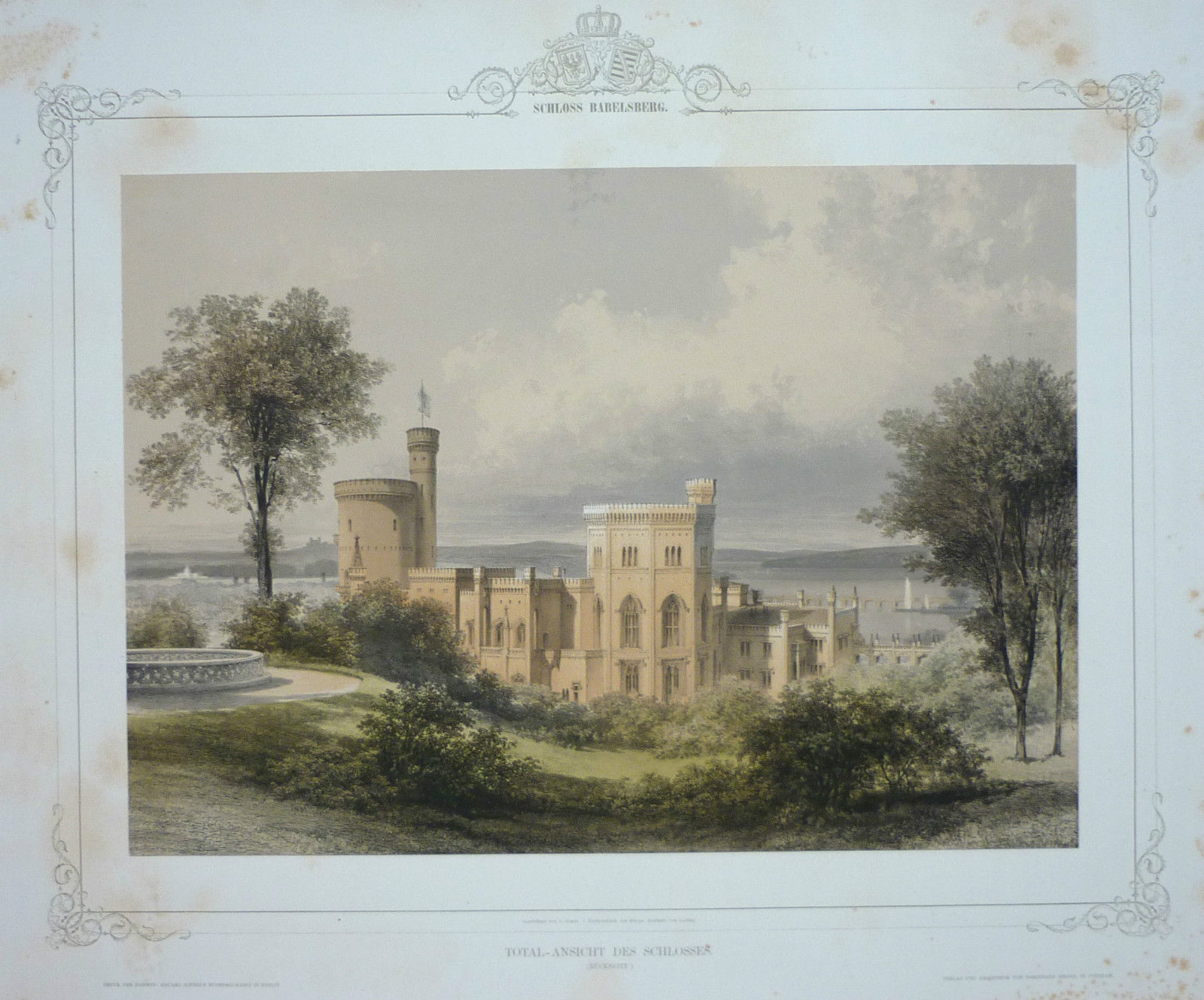
Babelsberg Palace, coloured lithography (1853)

Financial resources were tight, so Lenné could only proceed slowly. A hot summer withered most of his planting because the irrigation system failed. In addition, there were disputes between him and Princess Augusta, because they each had different visions for the future garden. The consequence was that Lenné was dismissed.

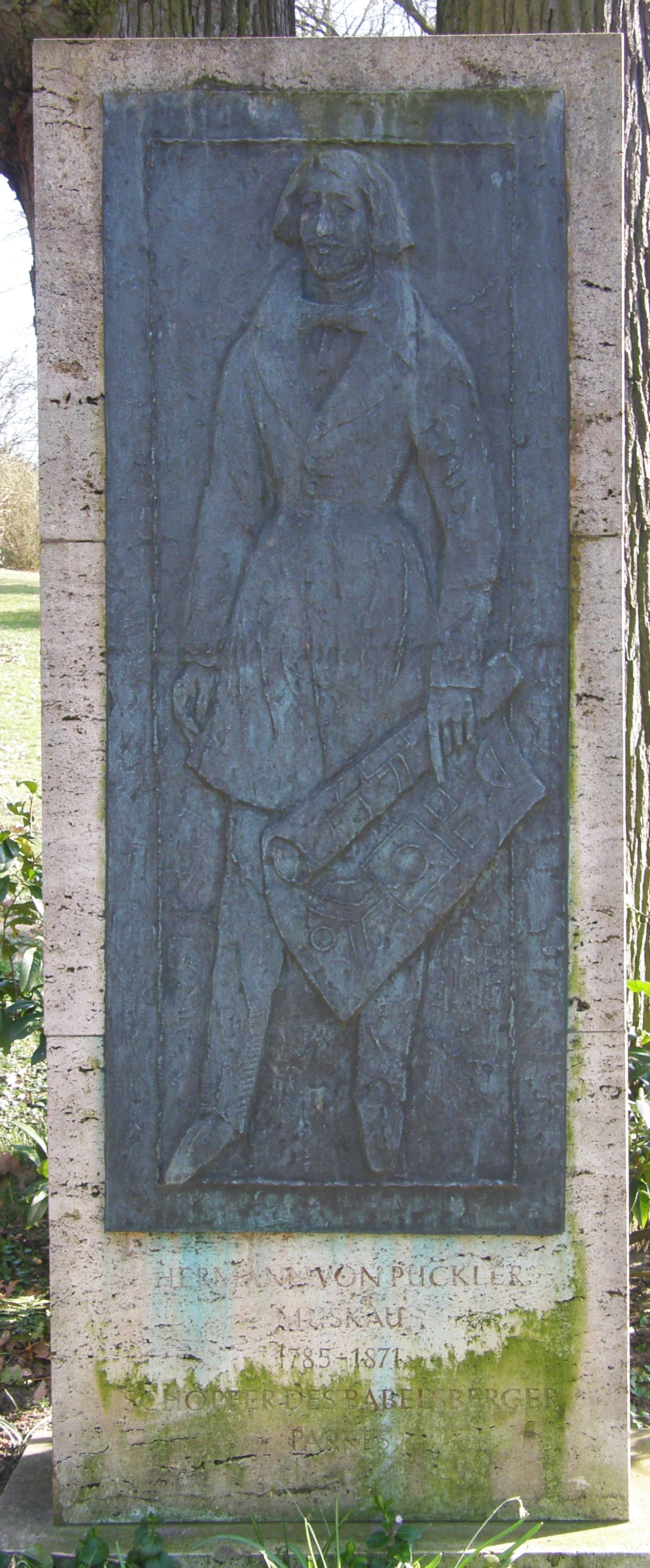
Monument to Pückler-Muskau in Babelsberg Park

In 1843 the former adjutant of the Grand Duchy of Weimar, Prince Hermann of Pückler-Muskau was given the task of continuing the landscape work. He had published his book Andeutungen über Landschaftsgärtnerei ("Thoughts on Landscape Gardening") and was probably known to Augusta, who came from the House of Saxe-Weimar.

The system of paths envisaged by Lenné, with their views of the Potsdam countryside, was retained by Pückler-Muskau, but it was enhanced by a network of narrower paths. He enlarged the embankment and terrace at the palace with surrounding terraces. In the pleasure ground below the palace, started by his predecessor, curved promenade paths were laid out and the flower beds were decorated with borders of coloured pottery. A newly laid out Golden Rose Staircase (Goldene Rosentreppe) above the pleasure ground, which was planted with red and white roses, led down to the lakeshore. Lenné had planted large individual trees, but Pückler-Muskau placed younger ones close together, which encouraged one another to grow in height and improved the soil with their fallen leaves.

The terrain, which originally only covered an area of 72 hectares, increased in size over the course of time as a result of purchases and donations. In 1865 a considerable area south of the Babelsberg hill was added by Otto Kindermann, who after the death of his father, Ferdinand Kindermann, took over his court gardener's post and dovetailed the new acquisitions of land harmoniously into the estate. In 1875, the park reached its present extent.

During individual phases of the park's development, artificial lakes were established. The Schwarze Meer and the water reservoir of the Achterbecken were laid out on the heights in the north, the Kindermannsee in the southwest and the Große See in the southeast.

Lenné drew the Böttcherberg hill of Berlin-Zehlendorf into the landscape garden of Babelsberg Parkes. The 66-metre-high (217 ft) eminence lay very close by, separated only by the Glienicke Lake. An observation point was established on the hill (Rondell, Fächeraussicht) with visual axes typical of Lenné's work, leading to the lakes of Jungfernsee, Weißer See, Krampnitzer See and Griebnitzsee. Near the highest point is the semi-circular Loggia Alexandra, open to Babelsberg Park, which Prince Charles had built in 1869 in memory of his dead sister.

Following the demise of the monarchy in 1918 and the ratification of the apportionment of assets and liabilities act (Gesetzes über die Vermögensauseinandersetzung) between the Prussian state and the members of the former ruling Prussian royal house on 26 October 1926, the House of Hohenzollern had to hand over the majority of its palaces to the Prussian state. In 1928 Babelsberg Palace and Park went into the charge of the Prussian Palace Authorities (Schlösserverwaltung).

From 1945 onwards large areas along the banks of the Havel River were utilised as beaches and for the establishment of the Karl Liebknecht District Maritime Training Centre (Bezirksausbildungszentrum für maritime Ausbildung "Karl Liebknecht") and the Organisation for Sport and Technology (Gesellschaft für Sport und Technik or GST). In addition, several buildings were put up behind the palace in the 1950s for the East German Academy of Politics and Law (Academie für Staats- und Rechtswissenschaften der DDR), making much of the park inaccessible. The deepest intrusion into the park was that of the Berlin Wall in 1961. The border zone was out of bounds and became overgrown. After the fall of the wall in 1989 gardeners reconstructed the terrain and it is now once more accessible.

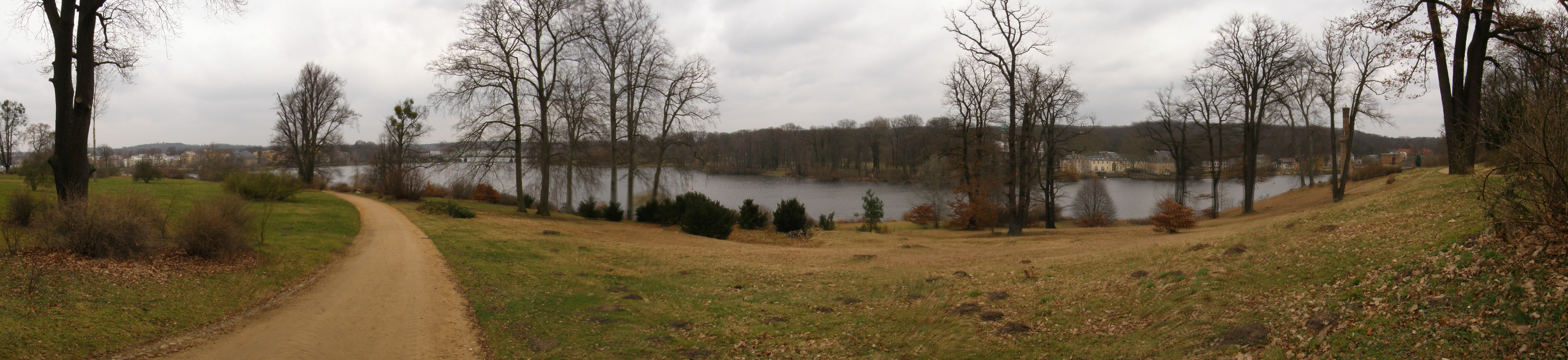
View from Babelsberg castle to the Havel river.

=== Park management ===
Babelsberg Park is sponsored and managed by the Berlin-Brandenburg Foundation for Prussian Palaces and Gardens (Stiftung Preußische Schlösser und Gärten Berlin-Brandenburg). The population of Babelsberg has heavily criticised the management. Many residents feel that the park authority is far too restrictive. This is mainly due to the strict ban on using the parkland for games. There are several initiatives that are trying to persuade the authorities to accede to the wishes of the local residents. Protests against the park authority resulted in several main paths in Babelsberg Park being officially opened to cyclists again in January 2008, including the Berlin Wall Way that runs through the park.

== Buildings in the park ==
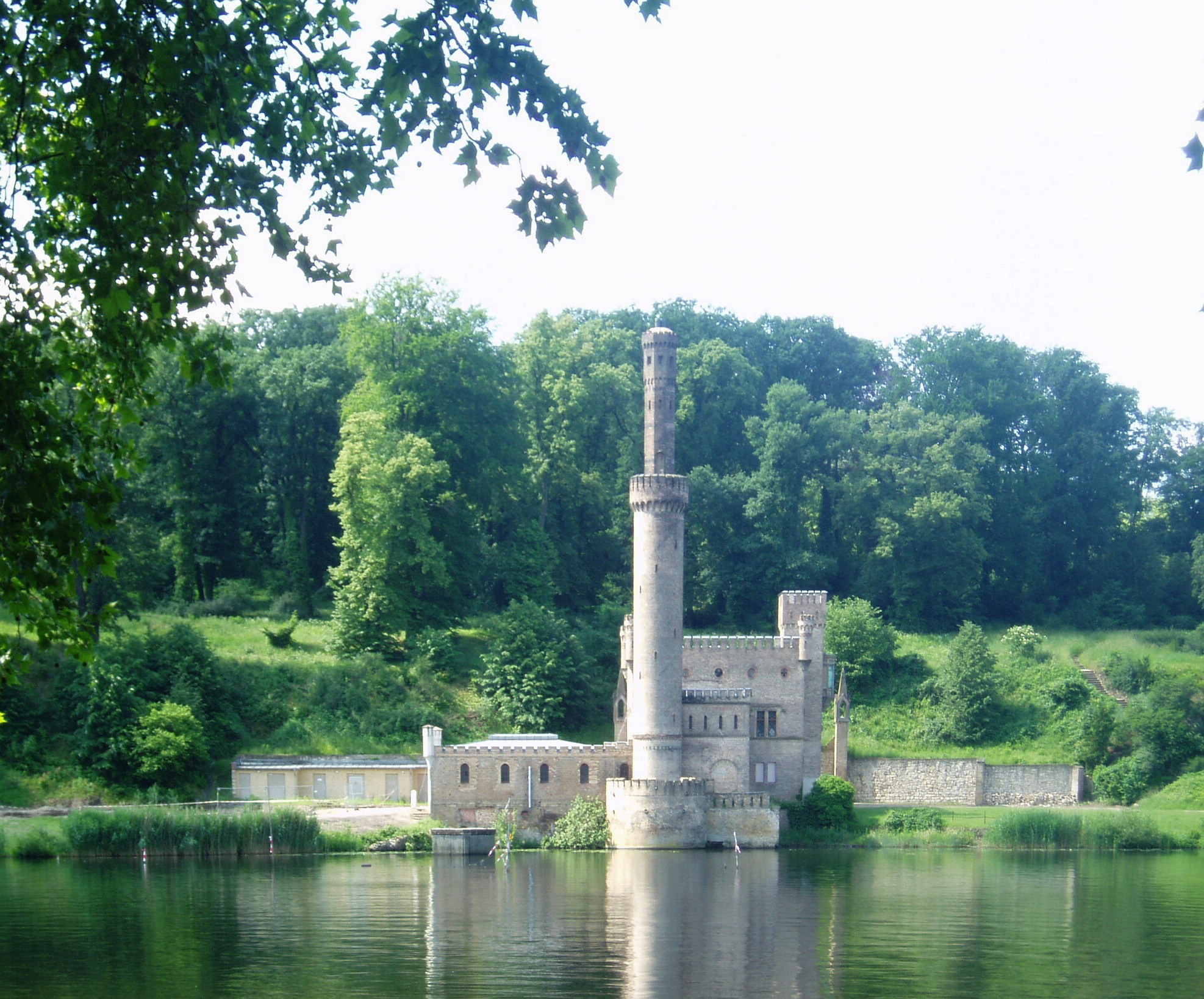
Steam-powered pump house

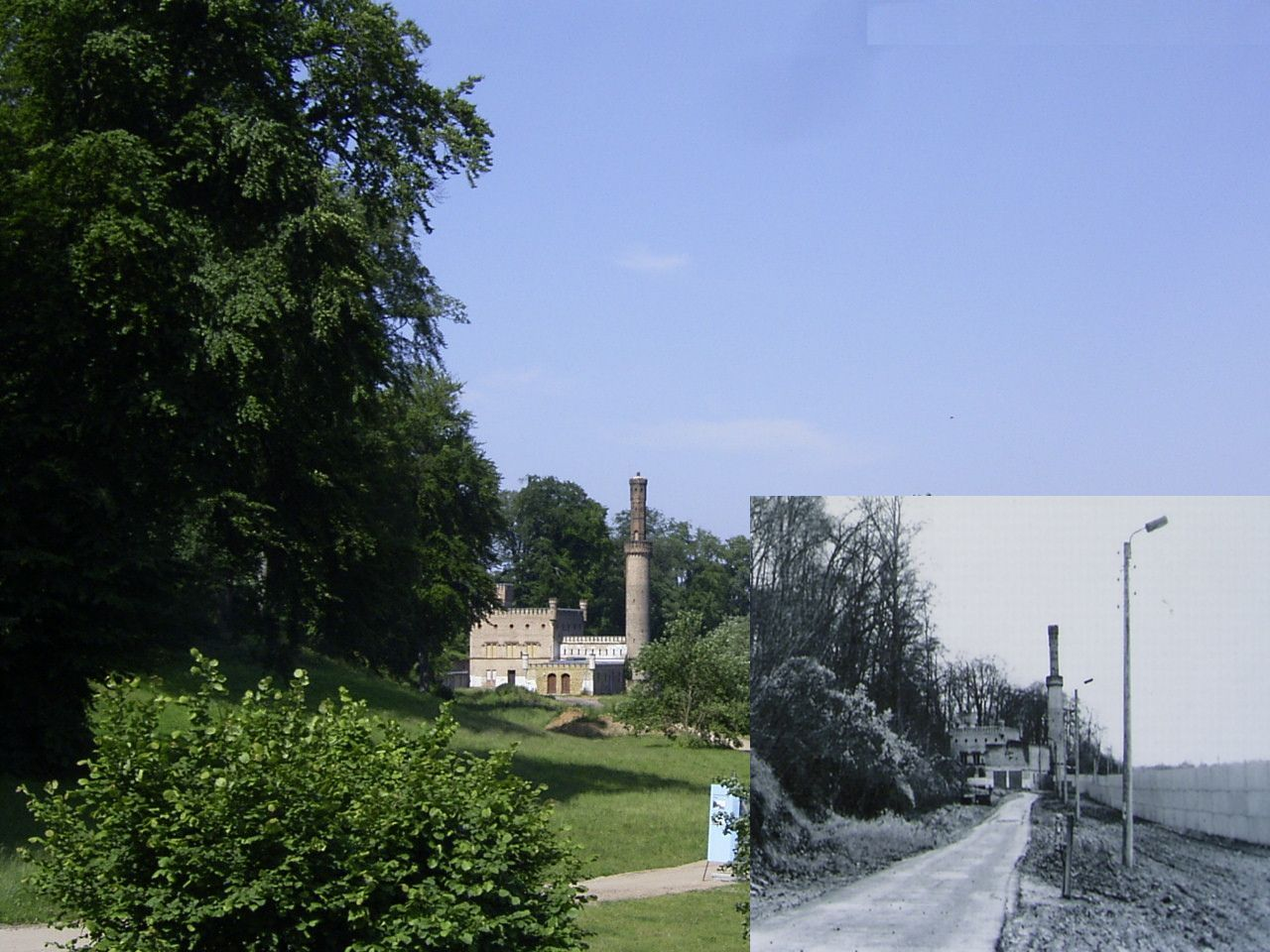
The steam-powered pump house in Babelsberg Park / Today and before 1989 with the border wall (photo montage)

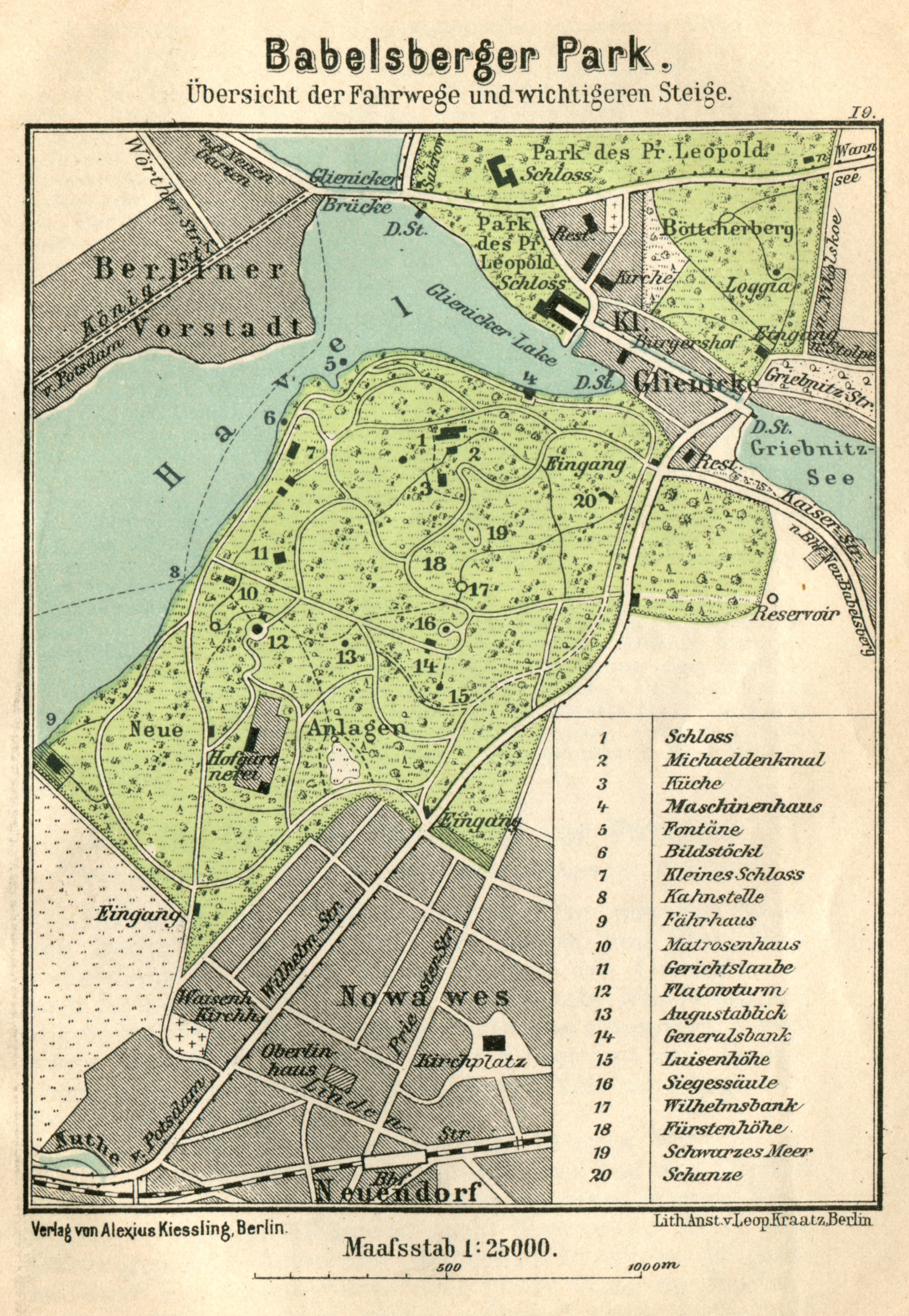

Apart from the Neogothic palace, other buildings, viewing points, rest areas with symbolic character and garden architecture have been created over the years.

- Steam-powered pump house
- Little Palace (Kleines Schloss)
- Royal Stables (Marstall)
- Court Arbour (Gerichtslaube)
- Sailors' House (Matrosenhaus)
- Flatow Tower (Flatowturm)

== Sources ==
- Amtlicher Führer der Stiftung Preußische Schlösser und Gärten Berlin-Brandenburg: Park und Schloss Babelsberg. 3. Auflage 1999
- Amtlicher Führer der Stiftung Preußische Schlösser und Gärten Berlin-Brandenburg: Der Flatowturm im Park Babelsberg. 1. Auflage 1994

Uwe Michas: Von Berlin nach Babelsberg - Die Gerichtslaube. In: Die Mark Brandenburg, Heft 53, Marika Großer Verlag: Berlin 2004 ISBN 978-3-910134-32-4
