= Babelsberg =

- Stadtteil of Potsdam
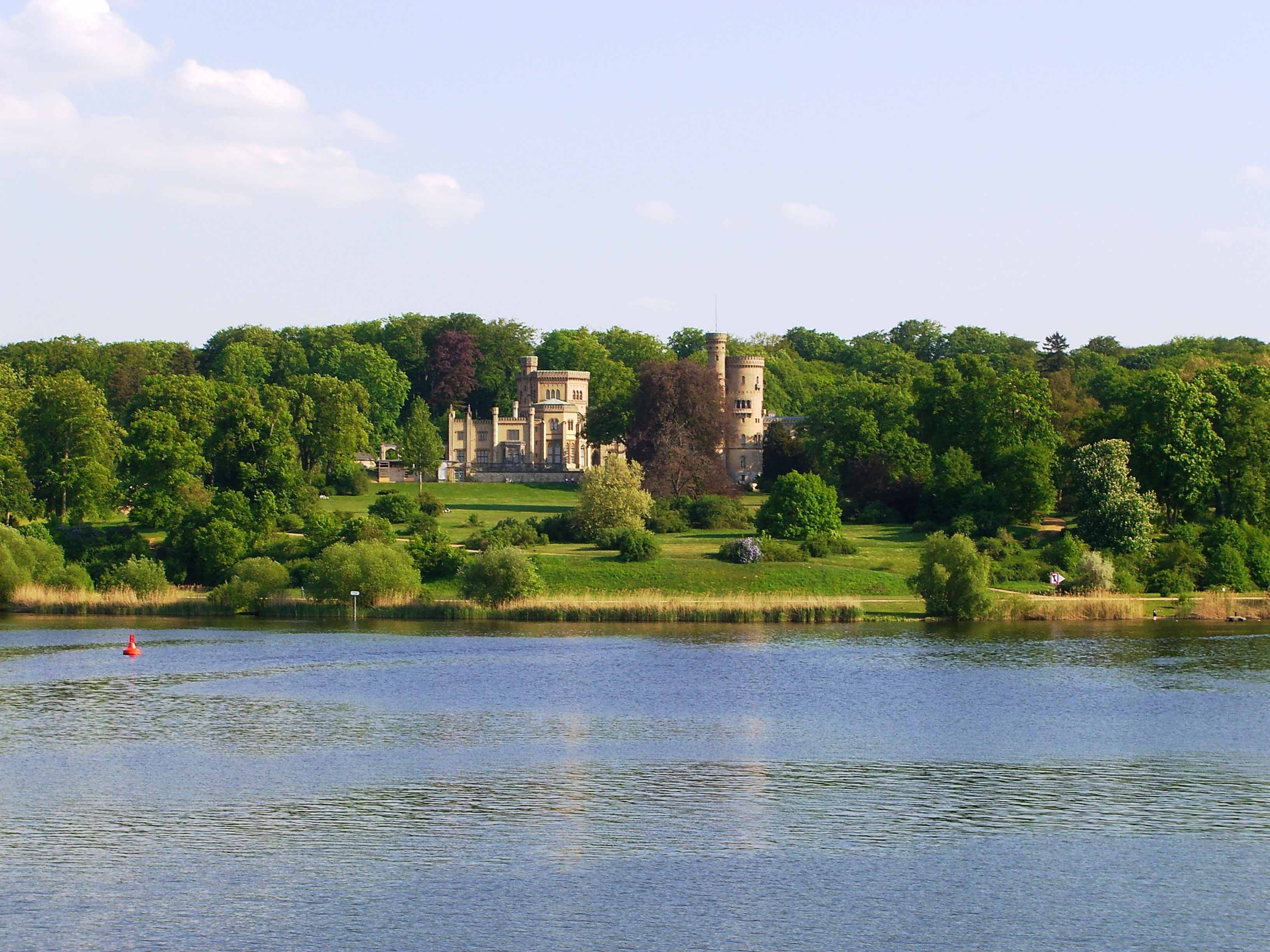
- Babelsberg Palace on the Havel river
- Interactive map of Babelsberg
- Location within Germany Location within Brandenburg
- Coordinates: 52°24′N 13°06′E
- Country: Germany
- State: Brandenburg
- City: Potsdam
- Time zone: UTC+01:00 (CET)
  - Summer (DST): UTC+02:00 (CEST)
- Dialling codes: 0331
- Vehicle registration: P

Babelsberg (German: [ˈbaːbl̩sˌbɛʁk]) is the largest quarter of Potsdam, the capital city of the German state of Brandenburg. The neighbourhood is named after a small hill on the Havel river. It is the location of Babelsberg Palace and Park, part of the Palaces and Parks of Potsdam and Berlin UNESCO World Heritage Site, as well as Babelsberg Studio, a historical centre of the German film industry and the first large-scale movie studio in the world.

== History ==
A settlement on the small Nuthe creek was first mentioned in the 1375 Landbuch (domesday book) by Emperor Charles IV of Luxembourg, who also ruled as Margrave of Brandenburg since 1373. Then called Neuendorf (New Village) after its former West Slavic name Nova Ves, it was shelled several times and was severely damaged during the Thirty Years' War.

In the mid-18th century the new village of Nowawes was founded by King Frederick II of Prussia and settled with Protestant Bohemian deportees, predominantly weavers who as descendants of the Unity of the Brethren had fled from the Counter-Reformation's suppression of their faith in the lands of the Habsburg monarchy during Empress Maria Theresa's rule. During the Industrial Revolution the area developed into a centre of textile and carpet manufacturing, and at the premises of Orenstein & Koppel, from 1899 on also railway production. For decades German Neuendorf and Bohemian Nowawes (Czech: Nová Ves) bordered on each other but remained separate municipalities until their official unification in 1907. Nowawes received town privileges in 1924.

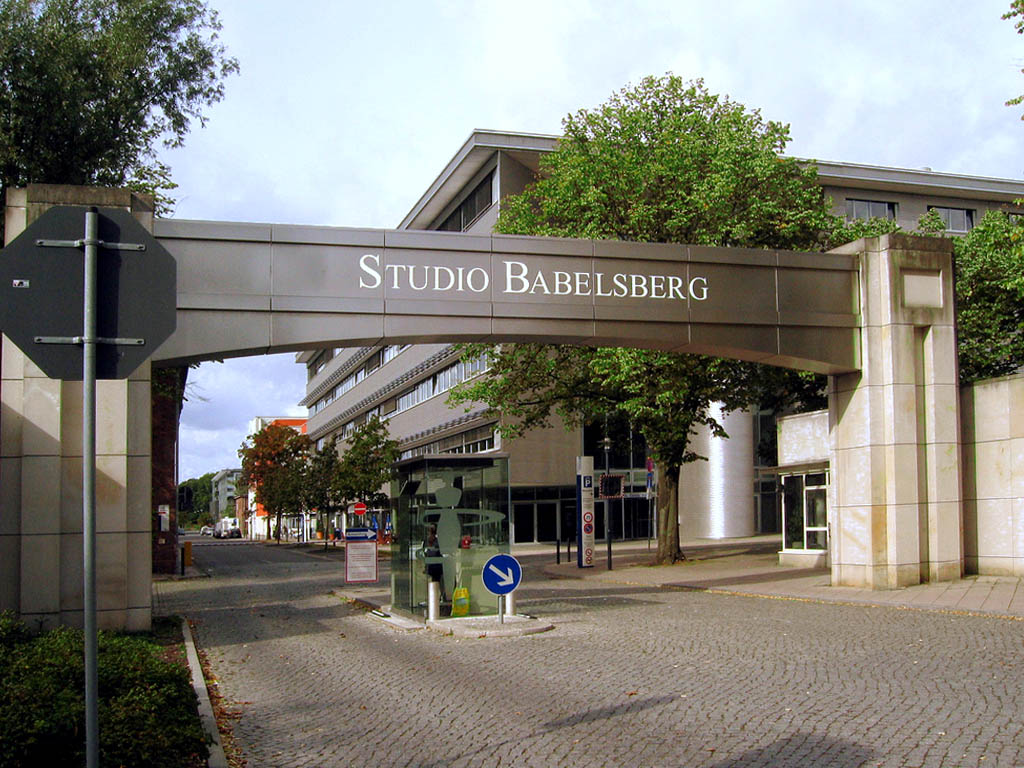
Babelsberg Movie Studios, the first large-scale film studio in the world (founded 1912) and the forerunner to Hollywood. It still produces global blockbusters every year.

From about 1900 the mansion colony of Neubabelsberg arose east of Babelsberg Park on the southern shore of the Griebnitzsee lake. There lived during 1920s for example German Jewish banker Jakob Goldschmidt and German businessman Günther Quandt at Kaiserstraße (today Karl-Marx-Straße). After the Universum Film AG (UFA) in 1922 had acquired a large backlot nearby, these villas built by famous architects like Hermann Muthesius and Ludwig Mies van der Rohe became popular residences of numerous film stars. Marika Rökk, Sybille Schmitz, Lilian Harvey, Willy Fritsch and Brigitte Horney lived and worked here when film production by the UFA continued without a break in the Nazi period, while many Jewish actors and directors were dispossessed and had to flee from Germany. In 1938 Nowawes and Neubabelsberg merged and were incorporated into Potsdam one year later, becoming the district of Potsdam-Babelsberg. During World War II, Babelsberg was the location of a subcamp of the Sachsenhausen concentration camp.

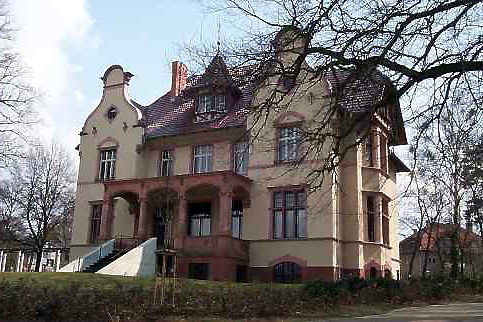
Mansion colony Neubabelsberg: Truman-Villa

During the 1945 Potsdam Conference, the representatives of the victorious Allies, Joseph Stalin, President Harry S. Truman, and Prime Minister Winston Churchill (until July 26, when he was succeeded by Clement Attlee) resided in mansions of Neubabelsberg. At the "Truman-Villa", the President issued the Potsdam Declaration and gave orders for the atomic bombings of Hiroshima and Nagasaki. Today the building serves as the seat of the liberal Friedrich Naumann Foundation.

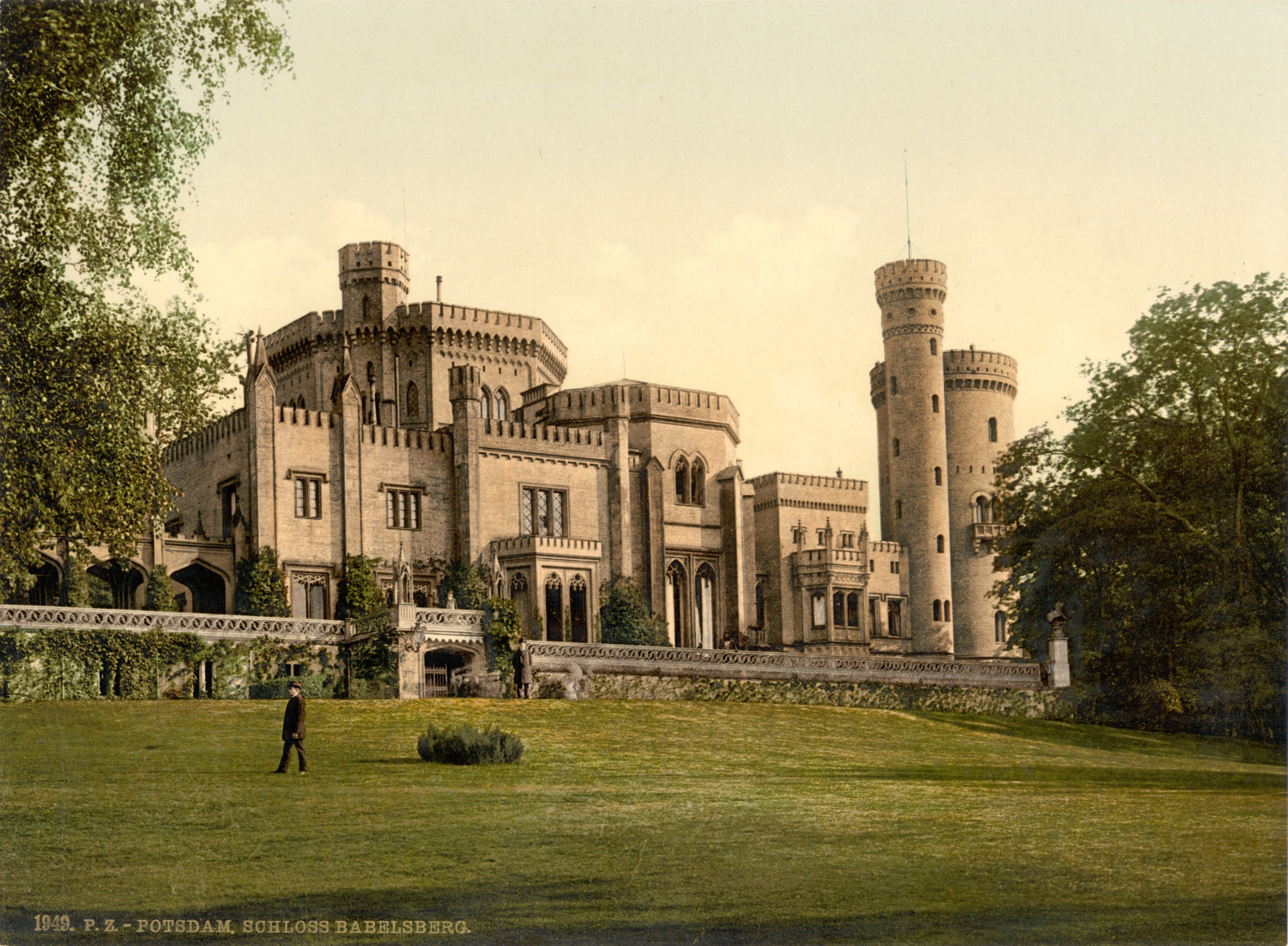
Babelsberg Palace, about 1900

== Babelsberg Palace ==
In 1833, Prince Wilhelm I, German Emperor had obtained the consent of his father King Frederick William III of Prussia to build a summer residence for him and his spouse Augusta of Saxe-Weimar-Eisenach on the slope of the Babelsberg hill, overlooking the Havel river. The first plans were designed in a Neo-Gothic style by Karl Friedrich Schinkel, but soon did not satisfy the growing demands of Wilhelm, who - as the marriage of his elder brother King Frederick William IV produced no children - meanwhile had achieved the status of Prussian crown prince. The palace was largely extended according to plans by Friedrich Ludwig Persius and finished in 1849.

Babelsberg remained a residence of Wilhelm after his accession to the Prussian and German throne. It was here, after a private conversation on 23 September 1862 he appointed Otto von Bismarck Minister President of Prussia and decided not to abdicate.

== Babelsberg today ==
Because of the closeness to Berlin and Potsdam, Babelsberg's history has much in common with its neighbours, notably the common history of Prussia, the Partition of Germany during the Cold War and German reunification. The neighbourhood shares a direct border with the Wannsee district of Berlin, where some remains of the Berlin Wall survive.

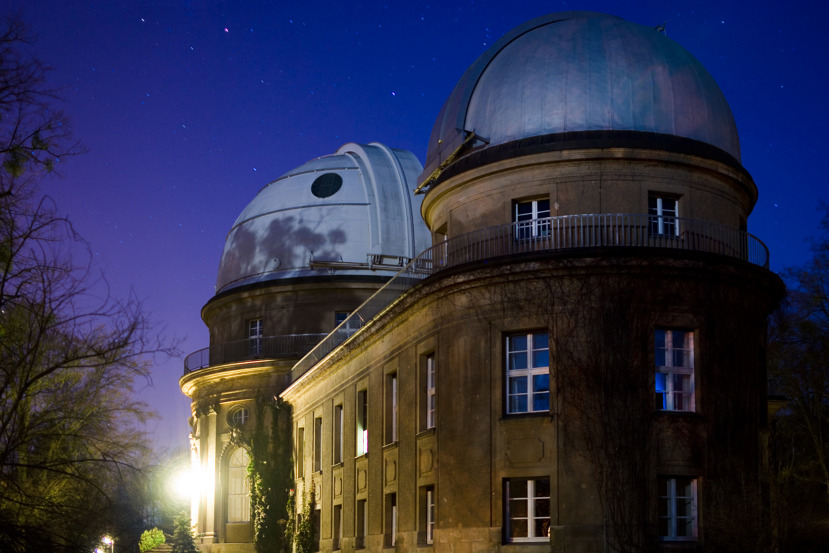
Babelsberg observatory

Babelsberg Studio is widely known as a European media centre and the oldest large-scale film studio in the world. It is also one of the two seats of the public Rundfunk Berlin-Brandenburg (rbb) broadcaster and home of the German Broadcasting Archive.

Since 1990 Babelsberg Palace with the surrounding park laid out by Peter Joseph Lenné and Hermann von Pückler-Muskau is part of the UNESCO Palaces and Parks of Potsdam and Berlin World Heritage Site and open to the public as a museum. One campus of the University of Potsdam as well as the Leibniz Institute for Astrophysics Potsdam (AIP) are situated within the park. Next to Neubabelsberg is the home of the Hasso Plattner Institute for software systems engineering.

The local SV Babelsberg 03 football club is based at the Karl-Liebknecht-Stadion, which is also the home ground of the 1. FFC Turbine Potsdam women's football team.

The German Industrial-Metal band Rammstein used Babelsberg castle to film their music video "Du Riechst So Gut 98".

== See also ==
- Steinstücken
- West Berlin
- Babelsberg Studios
- Potsdam-Babelsberg station
- Potsdam Medienstadt Babelsberg station
