= Babelsberg Palace =

- Schloss Babelsberg
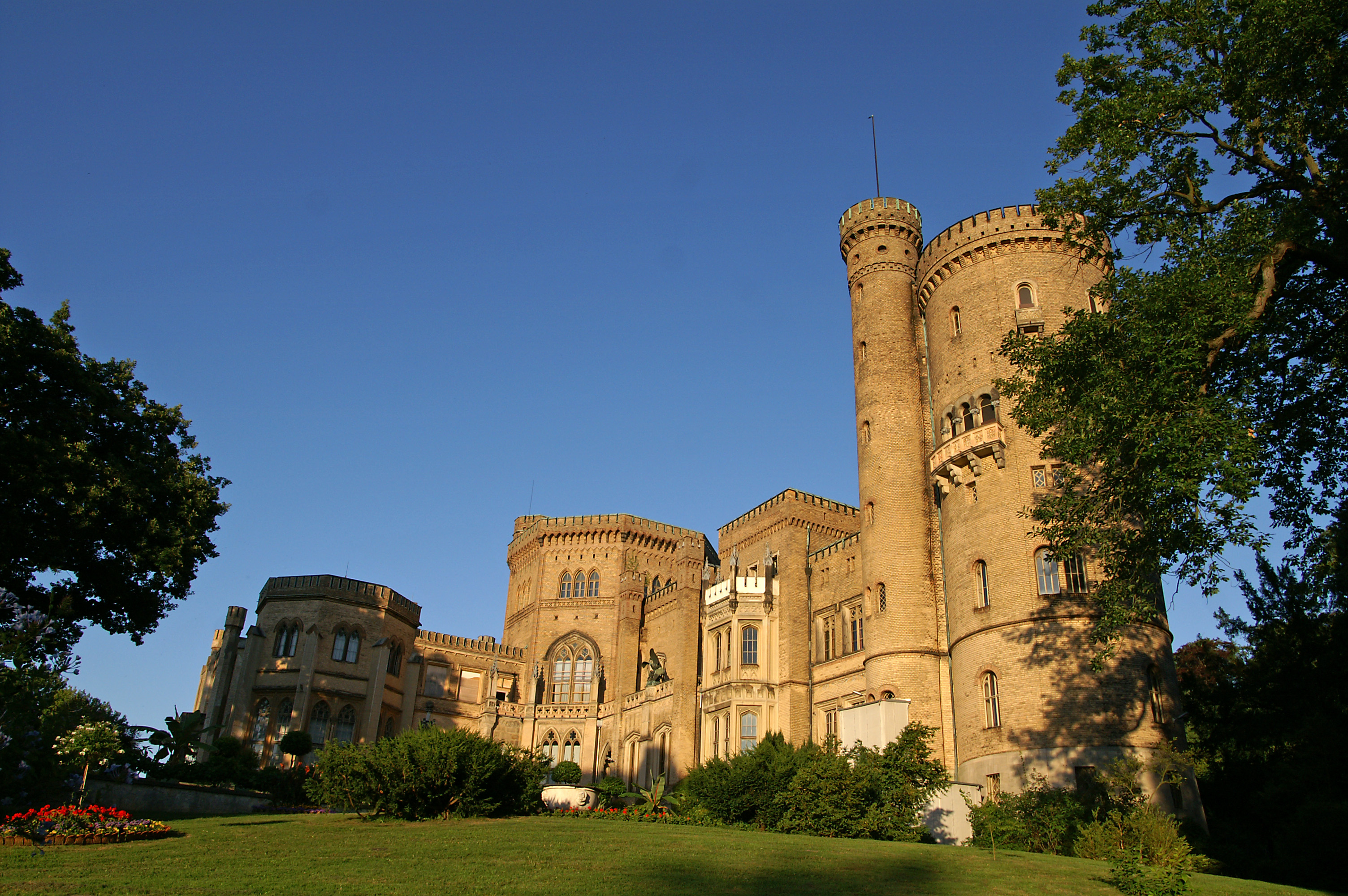
- Babelsberg Palace

- Location within Berlin

General information
- Type: Palace
- Architectural style: Gothic revival
- Location: Potsdam, Germany
- Coordinates: 52.407°N 13.093°E
- Construction started: 1833
- Completed: 1849
- Client: Prince (later Emperor); William I
- Owner: Stiftung Preußische Schlösser und Gärten Berlin-Brandenburg

Design and construction
- Architects: Karl Friedrich Schinkel; Ludwig Persius; Johann Heinrich Strack

Website
- Stiftung Preußische Schlösser und Gärten

UNESCO World Heritage Site
- Part of: Palaces and Parks of Potsdam and Berlin
- Criteria: Cultural: (i), (ii), (iv)
- Reference: 532ter
- Inscription: 1990 (14th Session)
- Extensions: 1992, 1999

Babelsberg Palace (German: Schloss Babelsberg) lies in the eponymous park and quarter of Potsdam, the capital of the German state of Brandenburg, near Berlin. For over 50 years it was the summer residence of Prince William, later German Emperor William I and King of Prussia and his wife, Augusta of the House of Saxe-Weimar-Eisenach, German Empress and Queen of Prussia. Along with the surrounding park and other parks in the area, the Babelsberg Palace was inscribed on the UNESCO World Heritage list in 1990 for its architectural cohesion and its testimony to the power of the Prussian monarchy.

== History ==
The building, designed in the English Gothic revival style, was built in two phases over the period 1833–1849. The contract to plan the palace was given to the architects Karl Friedrich Schinkel, who was in charge of the works until his death, in 1841, Ludwig Persius and Johann Heinrich Strack.

On 22 September 1862, in the palace and adjoining park, the discussion between King William I of Prussia and Otto von Bismarck took place that ended with the nomination of Bismarck as Minister President and Foreign Minister of Prussia.

The architecture of Babelsberg Palace formed the template for the construction of Kittendorf Palace between 1848 and 1853 in Mecklenburg-Vorpommern, by Schinkel's pupil, Friedrich Hitzig.

== World Heritage Site ==
Since 1990, Babelsberg Palace has been part of the UNESCO World Heritage Site "Palaces and Parks of Potsdam and Berlin". The palace is administered by the Stiftung Preußische Schlösser und Gärten Berlin-Brandenburg.

Since 2013, the palace has been undergoing an intense renovation of its facades and interiors.

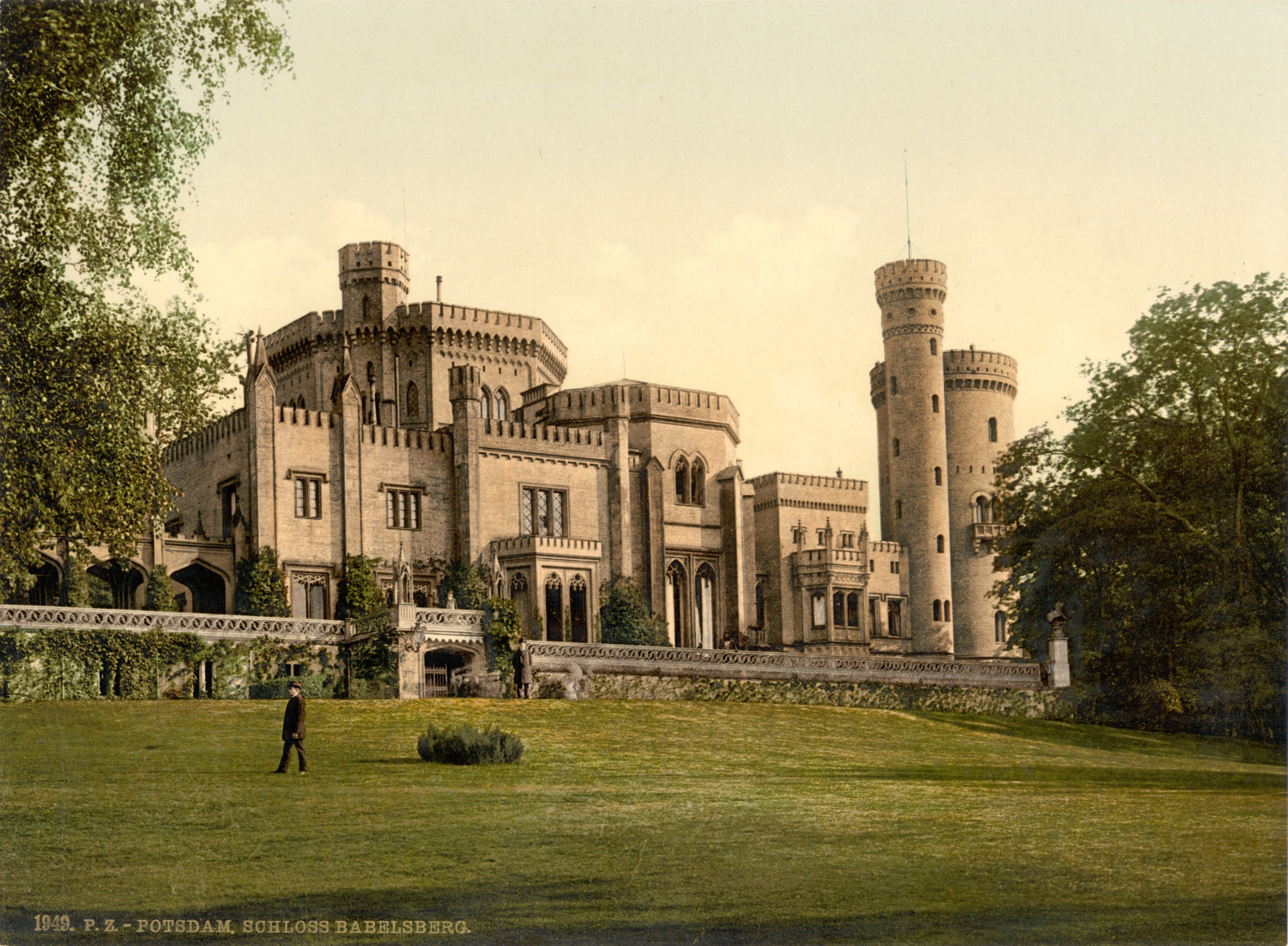
The palace c. 1900

== Gallery ==
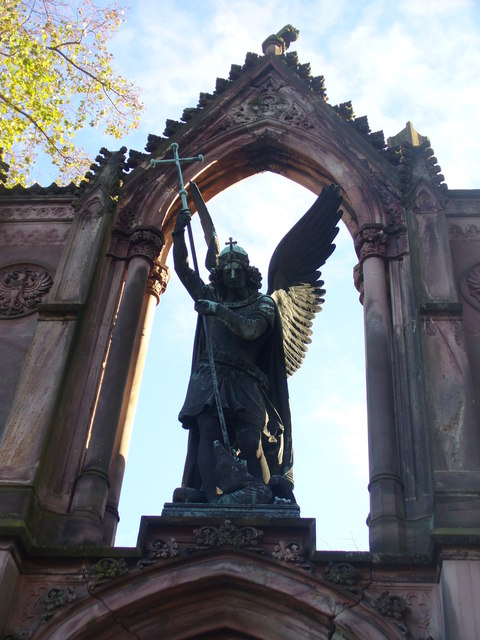
Archangel Michael

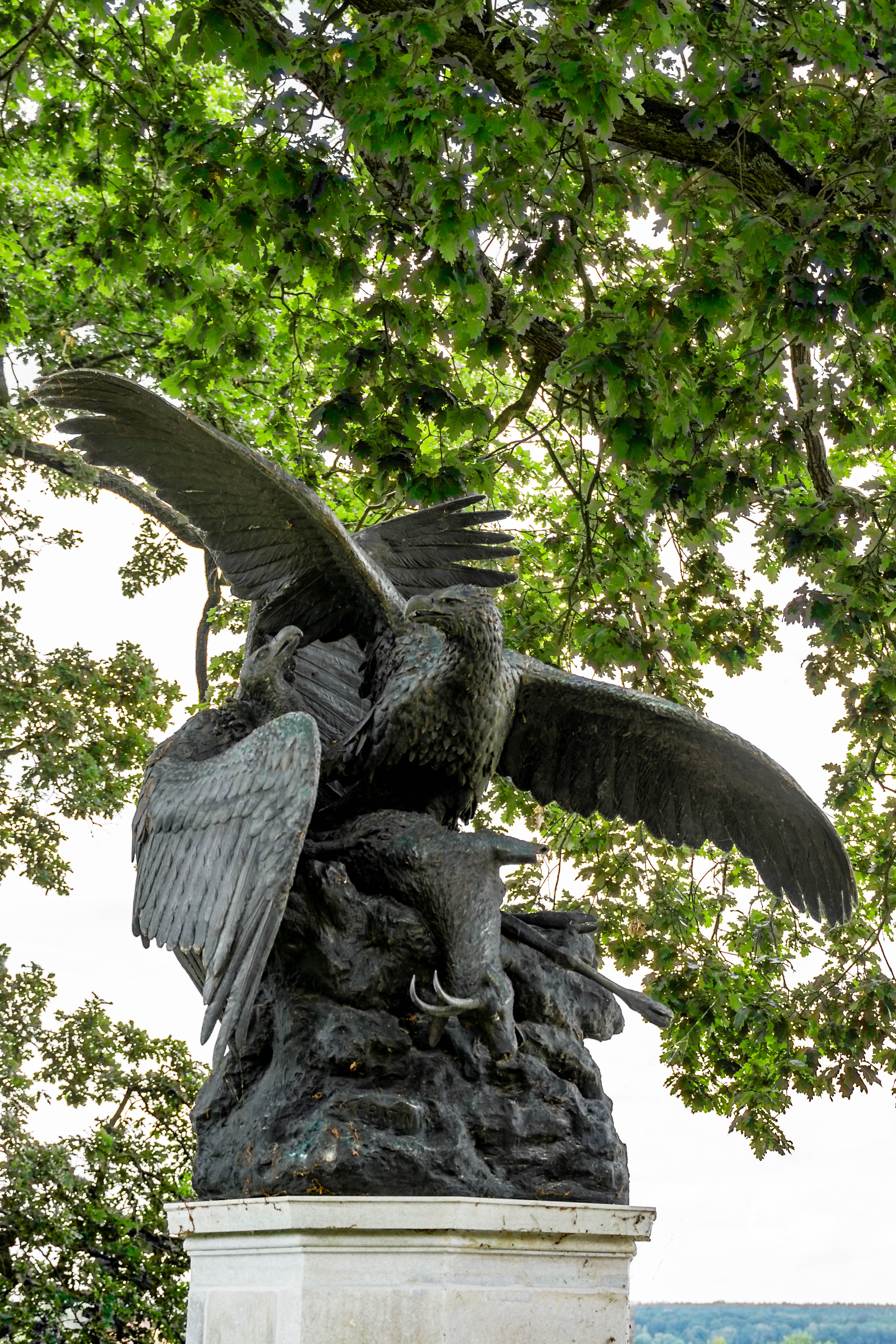
Eagle and vulture devouring a deer

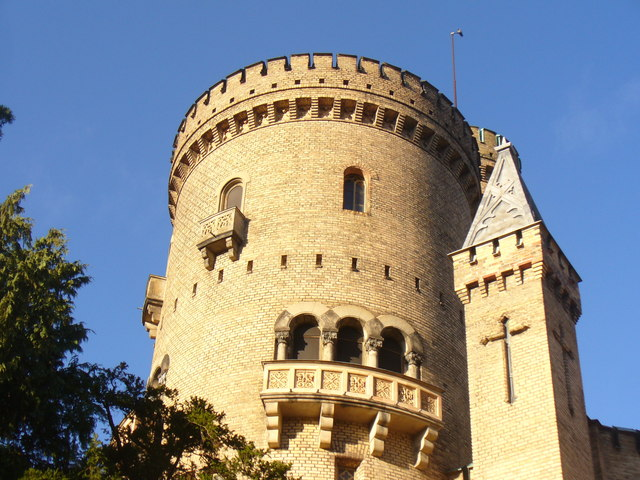
Palace Tower

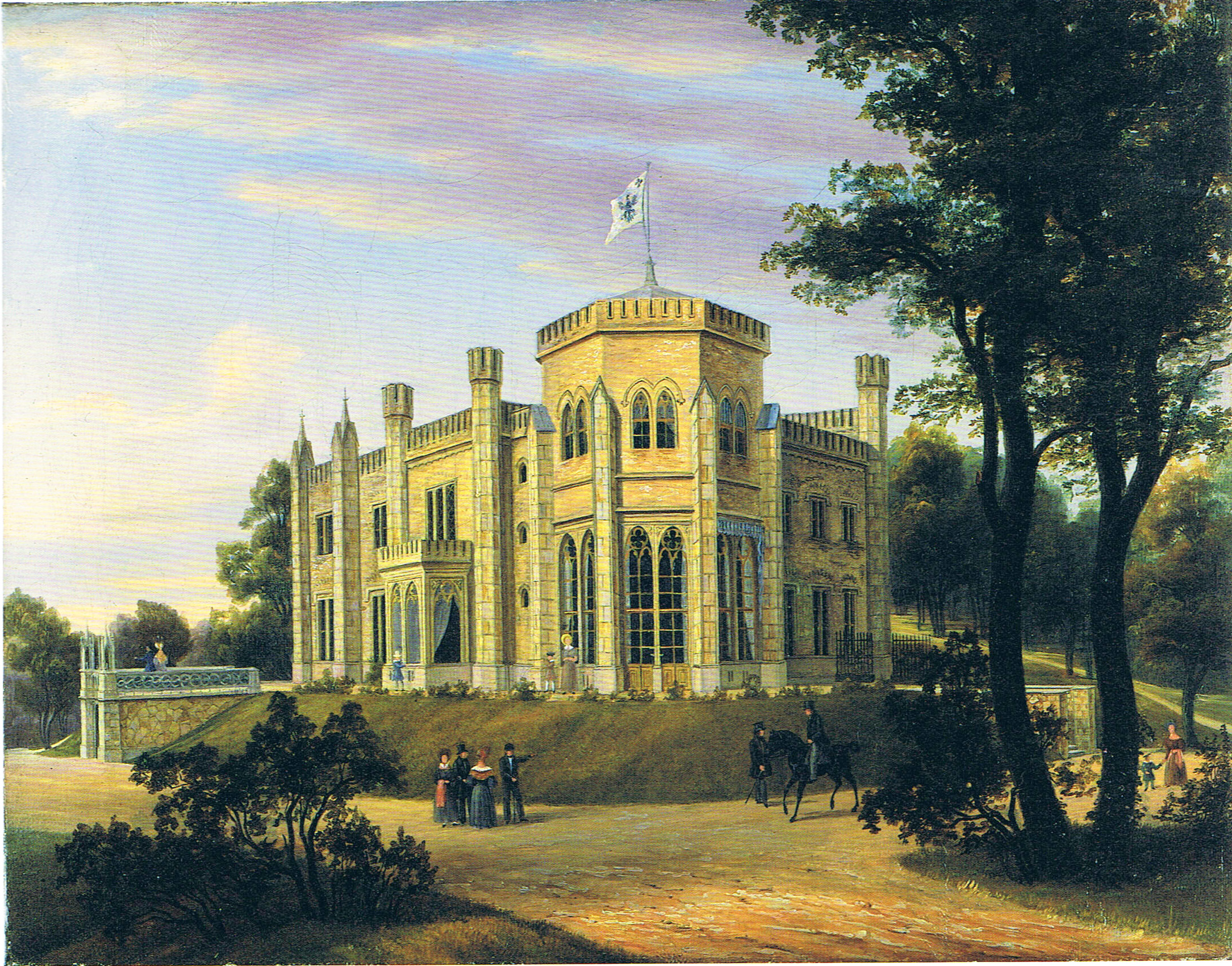
The Palace of Prince Wilhelm at Babelsberg by Carl Daniel Freydanck, 1838

== See also ==
- List of castles in Berlin and Brandenburg
- Palaces and Parks of Potsdam and Berlin
