= Peter Joseph Lenné =

Prussian gardener and landscape architect

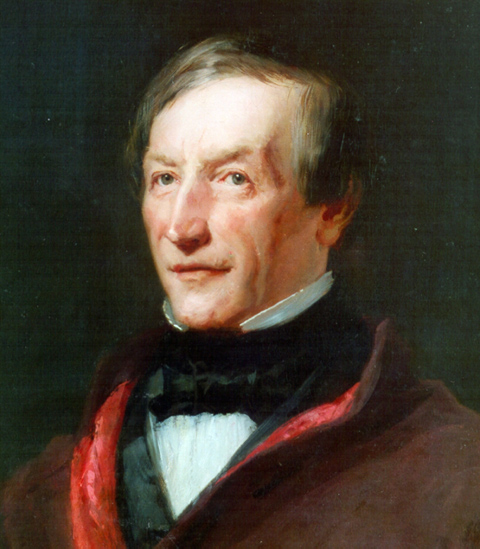
Peter Joseph Lenné, portrait by Carl Joseph Begas, c. 1850

Peter Joseph Lenné (the Younger) (29 September 1789 – 23 January 1866) was a Prussian gardener and landscape architect. As director general of the Royal Prussian palaces and parks in Potsdam and Berlin, his work shaped the development of 19th-century German garden design in the Neoclassical style. Laid out according to the principles of the English landscape garden, his parks are now World Heritage Sites.

== Life and works ==
Lenné was born in Bonn, then part of the Electorate of Cologne, the son of the court and university gardener Peter Joseph Lenné the Elder (1756–1821), and his wife, Anna Catharina Potgieter (also Potgeter), daughter of the mayor of Rheinberg. The Lenné family originated from the Prince-Bishopric of Liège. Circa 1665, Peter Joseph's ancestor Augustin Le Neu had settled in Poppelsdorf near Bonn as court gardener of Archbishop-Elector Maximilian Henry of Bavaria.

=== Childhood and development ===
Having obtained his Abitur degree, Peter Joseph Lenné decided to adopt the family tradition. He began his apprenticeship as a gardener in 1808 with his uncle, Josef Clemens Weyhe, court gardener at the electoral Augustusburg and Falkenlust Palaces, Brühl. At the instigation of his father, he also took university courses in botany.

From 1809 to 1812, his father paid for Lenné's many study trips to France, Switzerland, and Southern Germany. In 1811, he completed a long internship in Paris with Gabriel Thouin, who was then one of the most famous garden architects in Europe. This made him a master landscaper. On another of these trips, Lenné made the acquaintance of the creator of the English Garden in Munich, the landscape gardener Friedrich Ludwig von Sckell, who would have a lasting influence on Lenné's work.

=== Assistant gardener ===
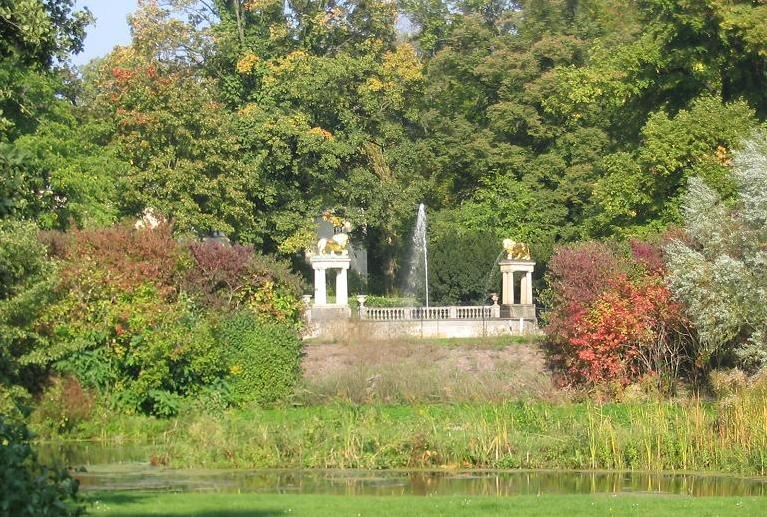
The Glienicke Hunting Lodge Park with views to the Lion Fountain at Glienicke Palace

In 1812, Lenné followed his father to Koblenz, where he had been named Director of the Gardens by the Prefect Jules Doazan. Later in that year, Lenné became active at Schloss Schönbrunn, where he would remain until 1814. He then returned to Koblenz, where he was given private garden commissions until 1815. Extensions to the city's fortifications gave him an opportunity to propose a plan for its beautification by the addition of gardens; however, this was not carried out because of lack of funds. In 1816, he returned to Potsdam at the suggestion of Prussian forestry official Georg Ludwig Hartig and General Graf von Hacke. There he received the position of Assistant Gardener to the Court Garden Director at Sanssouci.

While still working as an assistant gardener, in spring 1816 Lenné received a commission from the Prussian chief minister Karl August von Hardenberg to renovate the grounds around his country house at Klein-Glienicke. This work on Glienicke Palace, which would later become Prince Carl of Prussia's residence, laid the groundwork for Lenné's designs for the surrounding area of Potsdam, which he wanted to turn into a Gesamtkunstwerk. The upgrades of the Glienicke grounds were followed - in close cooperation with the architects Karl Friedrich Schinkel, Ludwig Persius, and Ferdinand von Arnim - by those of others such as the Böttcherberg and facing it Babelsberg Park, which was completed by Prince Hermann von Pückler-Muskau. Characteristic of Lenné's work are versatile sight axes - a horticultural stylistical device - which he applied at Sanssouci Park and elsewhere. As part of the Berlin-Potsdam cultural landscape, which stretches from the Pfaueninsel to Werder, many sites of Lenné's work are World Heritage Sites and have been under the protection of UNESCO collectively since 1990.

=== Prussian Garden Director-General ===
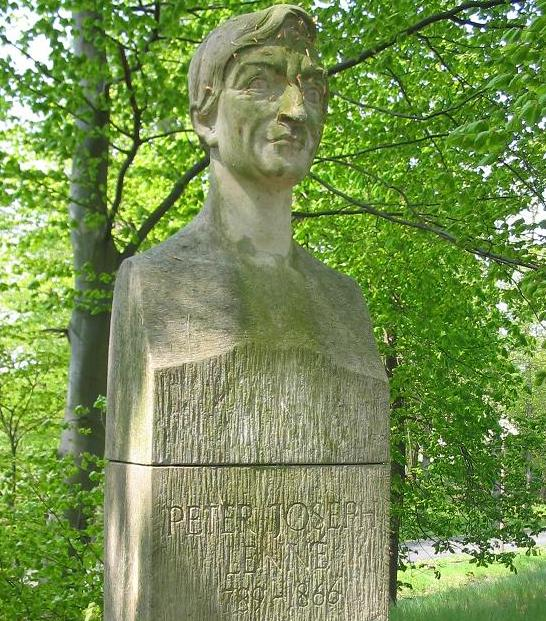
Bust in Landschaftspark Petzow

The accomplishments of the garden architect are reflected in his career progression. In 1818 he was an employee of the Royal Garden Authority, and in 1822, he received a promotion to Gardening Director. That same year, Lenné became a founding member of the Prussian Society for the Promotion of Horticulture. Lenné also accepted the position of Manager of the Division of Orchard Cultivation and later of the Parks Division.

In 1823, the Gardener Academy in Schöneberg and Potsdam was founded under his management. Here garden architecture was taught in a scientific manner for the first time. In 1828, Lenné was named the sole Garden Director and in 1845, Prussian Garden Director-General. The Prussian Academy of Arts made Lenné an honorary member.

In 1840, the recently enthroned King Frederick William IV assigned the urban planning of Berlin to Lenné. One of his most important achievements in this role survives in the building of the Luisenstadt Canal, constructed in 1852, between the Landwehrkanal and the River Spree in Kreuzberg. The canal's design was based on plans by Chief Building Officer Johann Carl Ludwig Schmid. In the 1850s, he advised on the planning of several cities, including Dresden, Leipzig and Munich.

Despite centering his life around Potsdam and Berlin, Lenné remained attached to his Rhenish homeland and contributed to the further beautification of Koblenz, particularly in the Rheinanlagen, which was under his management until 1861. His love of his work on the Rhine and Mosel made him decide to build the residence named for him, the Lenné-Haus, in which he wished to spend the evening of his life; however, the manner of his death did not allow this. Lenné's last resting place is at the Bornstedt Cemetery in Potsdam.

Busts of Peter Joseph Lenné are located at the Botanical Garden, Bonn, on the bank of the Rhine (Alter Zoll), in the Landschaftspark Petzow that he himself designed, in Feldafing Park, in Park Sanssouci, and in the Kaiserin-Augusta-Anlagen in Koblenz (copy of a bust by Rauch). A recent bust was finished by Bad Homburg sculptor Otto Weber-Hartl.

== Main works ==
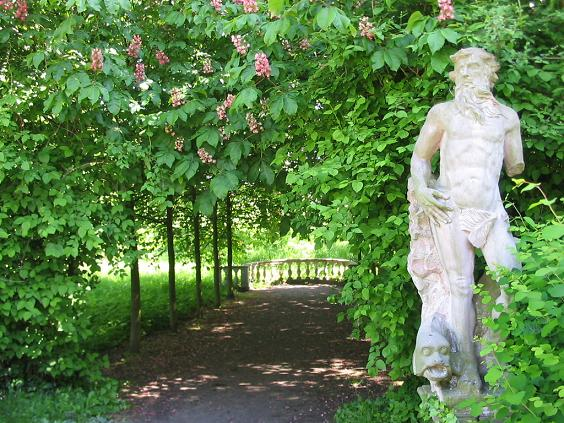
Statuary in Park of Blankensee Palace, in Trebbin

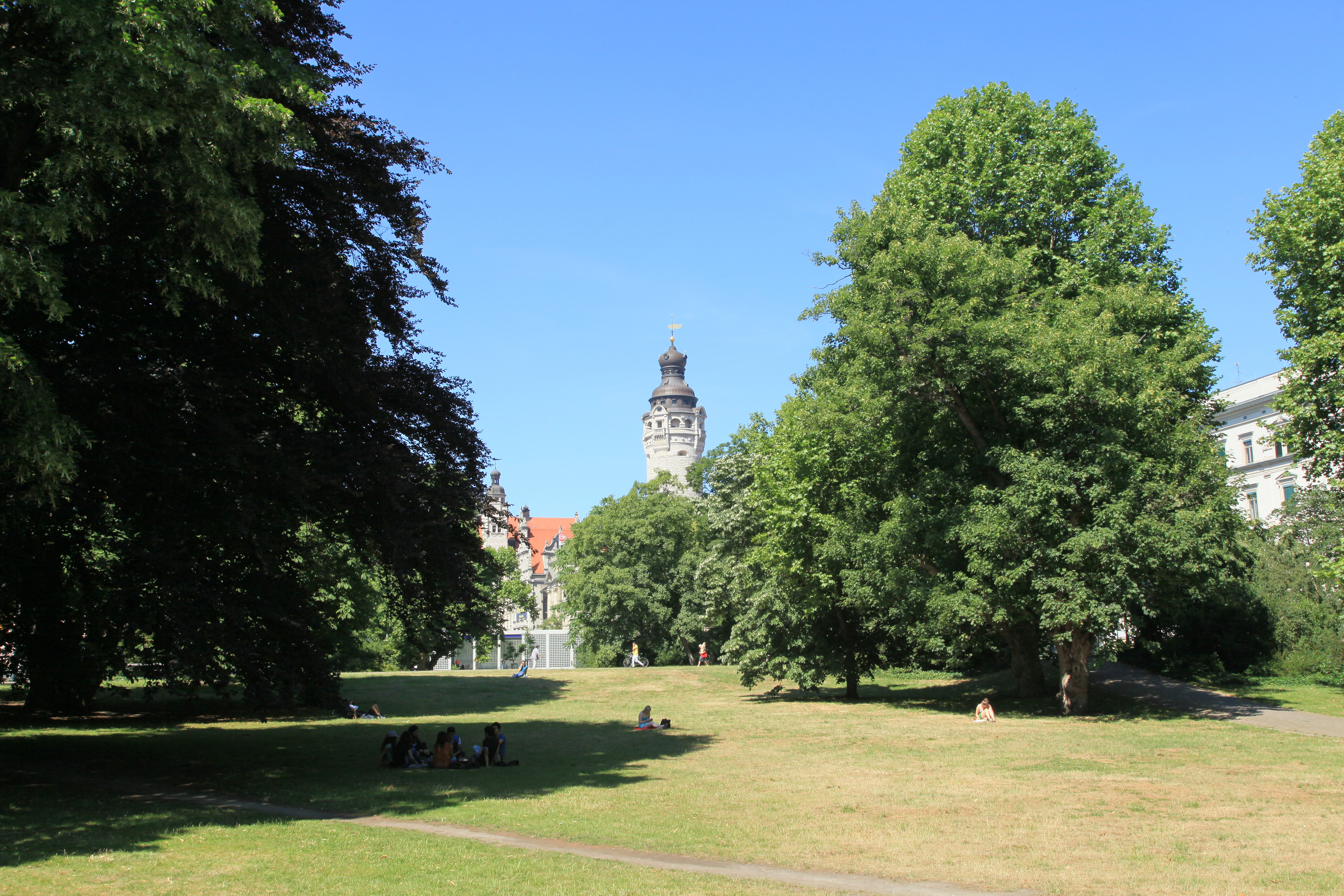
Leipzig - Promenadenring

- Park of Neuhardenberg Palace
- Roseninsel and Lenné Park in Feldafing at Lake Starnberg
- Klosterbergegarten in Magdeburg
- Zwierzyniec Park, Złotów
- Sanssouci Park (Charlottenhof Park) in Potsdam
- Garden of Caputh Palace, Brandenburg
- Landscape park at Petzow Palace, Werder
- Park Glienicke, Berlin
- Design for the landscape park in Blumberg (now part of Ahrensfelde)
- Design for the Landwehrkanal
- Design for the Luisenstädtischer Kanal, Berlin
- Design for the Tiergarten, Berlin
- Design for the parks at Blankensee Palace, in Trebbin
- Design for the Spa Gardens at Bad Homburg
- Gardens of Schloss Liebenberg in the Löwenberger Land, described in Fontane's Fünf Schlösser (Volume 5 of Wanderungen durch die Mark Brandenburg)
- Park of Remplin Palace
- Park of Wolfshagen Palace
- Park of Schloss Trebnitz (at Müncheberg)
- Lenné Park in Frankfurt (Oder)
- Kaiserin-Augusta-Anlagen on the Rhine and Electoral Palace, Koblenz
- Elisengarten, City Park and Spa Gardens in Aachen
- Park and Zehnthof in Sinzig
- Gardens of Friedrichsfelde Palace, now Tierpark Friedrichsfelde, in Berlin
- Clifftop gardens at Stolzenfels Castle, Koblenz
- Schlosspark, Brühl
- Design for the Spa Gardens at Bad Oeynhausen
- Park of Fürstlich Drehna, in Luckau (collaboration)
- Schillerpark (also called Lenné-Anlage, southeastern part of Promenadenring), and Johannapark, Leipzig
- Parts of Bürgerwiese gardens in Dresden
- Dresden Zoo
