= Palaces and Parks of Potsdam and Berlin =

UNESCO World Heritage Site in Germany

UNESCO World Heritage Site
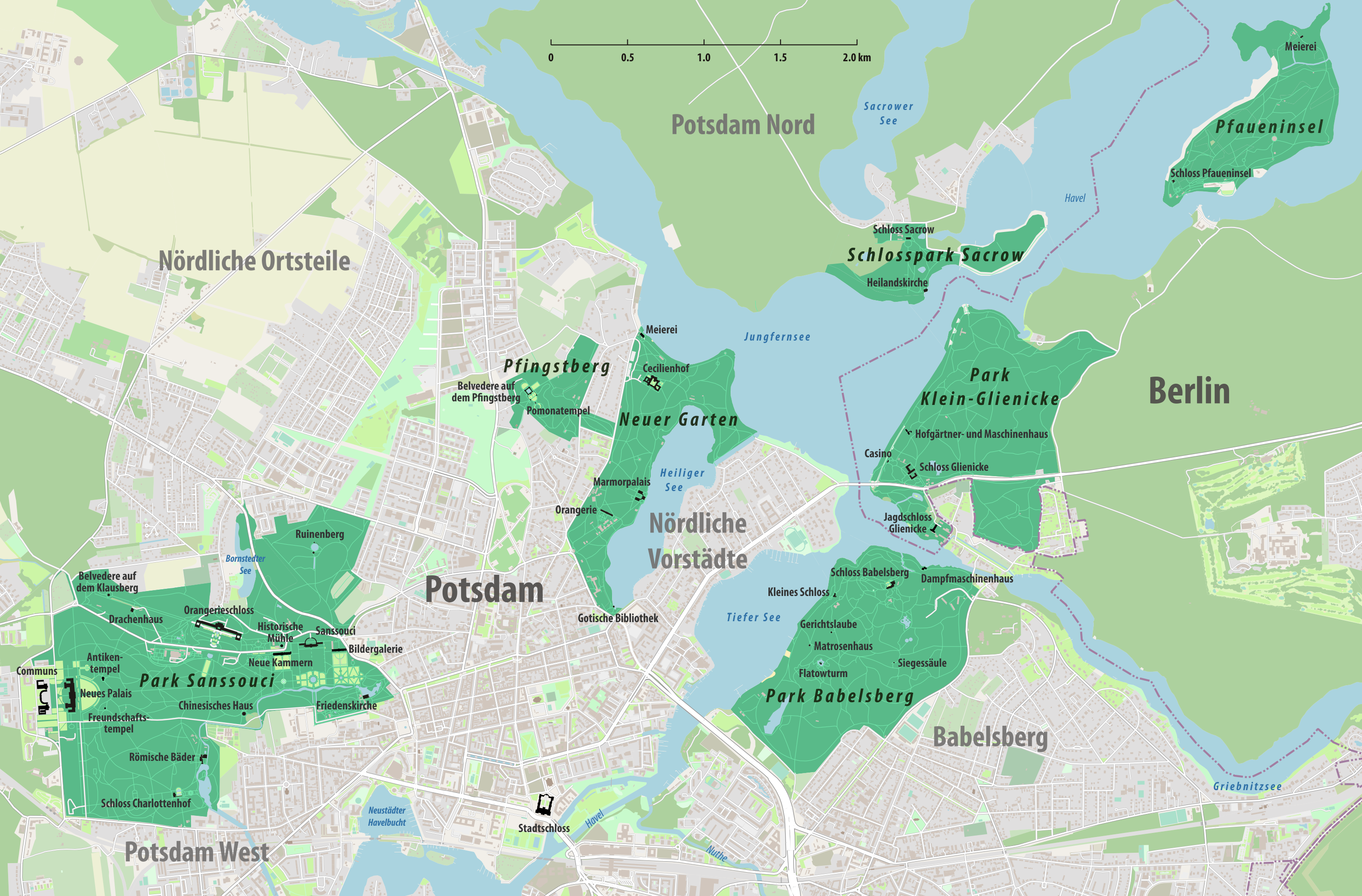
- Palaces and Parks of Potsdam and Berlin

- Location within Germany Location within Brandenburg
- Location: Potsdam and Berlin, Germany
- Criteria: Cultural: i, ii, iv
- Reference: 532
- Inscription: 1990 (14th Session)
- Extensions: 1992, 1999
- Area: 2,064 ha (5,100 acres)
- Coordinates: 52°24′00″N 13°02′00″E

Palaces and Parks of Potsdam and Berlin (German: Schlösser und Gärten von Potsdam und Berlin) are a group of palace complexes and extended landscaped gardens located in the Havelland region around Potsdam and the German capital of Berlin. The term was used upon the designation of the cultural ensemble as a World Heritage Site by UNESCO in 1990. It was recognized for the historic unity of its landscape—a unique example of landscape design against the background of monarchic ideas of the Prussian state and common efforts of emancipation.

== Extent ==
Initially, the world heritage site encompassed 500 hectares, covering 150 construction projects, which spanned the years from 1730 to 1916. Until the Peaceful Revolution of 1989, these areas were separated by the Berlin Wall, running between Potsdam and West Berlin, and several historic sites were destroyed by 'death strip' border fortifications.

Two stages of extension to the World Heritage Site, in 1992, and 1999 led to the incorporation of a larger area. The Prussian Palaces and Gardens Foundation Berlin-Brandenburg, which administers the site, puts the area at 2,064 hectares.

== 1990 designation ==
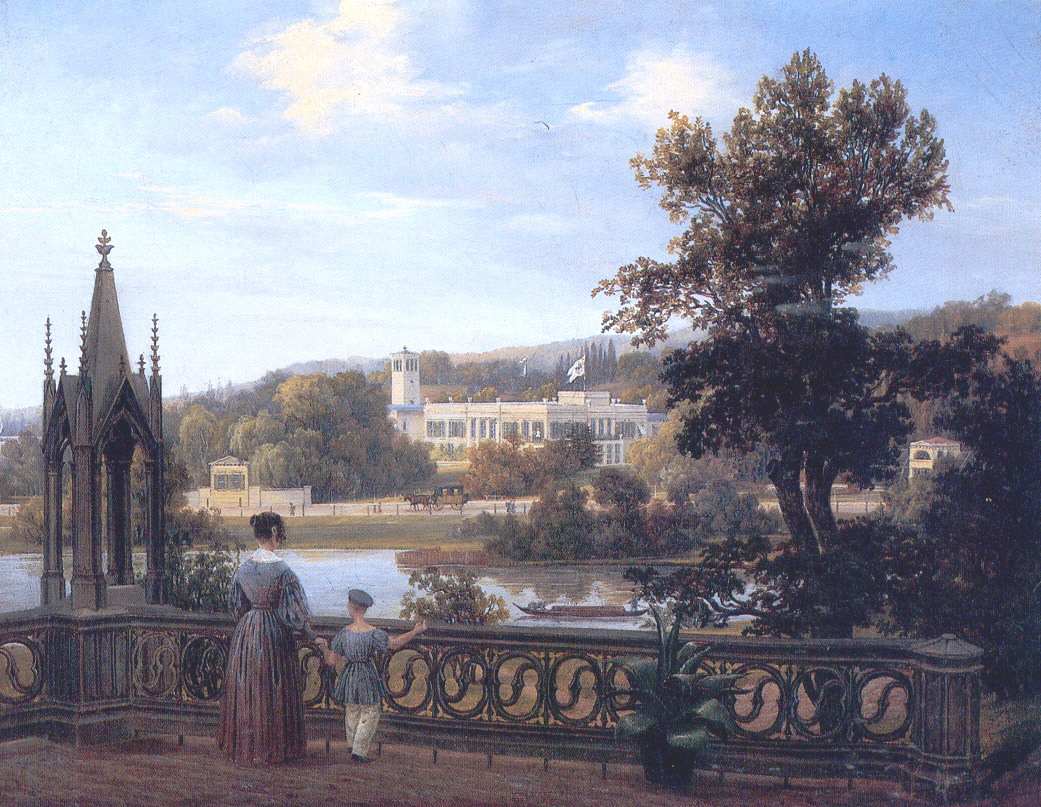
Aspect of Glienicke Palace from Babelsberg, Carl Daniel Freydank, around 1838

- Palace and Park of Sanssouci, Potsdam
- Neuer Garten (New Garden), Marmorpalais (Marble Palace), and Schloss Cecilienhof, northeast of Sanssouci, Potsdam
- Park Babelsberg and Schloss Babelsberg, Potsdam
- Schloss Glienicke and Park Klein-Glienicke, Berlin
- Nikolskoe log house, Berlin
- Pfaueninsel (Peacock Island), Berlin
- Böttcherberg (Mount Böttcher), Berlin
- Jagdschloß Glienicke (Glienicke hunting lodge), Berlin

== 1992 extension ==
- Heilandskirche (Church of the Redeemer), Sacrow (Potsdam)
- Palace and Park of Sacrow, Potsdam

== 1999 extension ==
- Lindenallee, Potsdam
- Königliche Gärtnerlehranstalt (former gardeners' school) and the Kaiserbahnhof, Potsdam
- Palace and Park of Lindstedt, Potsdam
- Village of Bornstedt, church, cemetery and landscape north of Park Sanssouci, Potsdam
- The Seekoppel (landscape area west of Ruinenberg (Mount of Ruins)), Potsdam
- Voltaireweg (greenbelt and road between Park Sanssouci and Neuer Garten), Potsdam
- Entrance area of Park Sanssouci, Potsdam
- Alexandrowka log houses ("Russian colony"), Potsdam
- The Pfingstberg and Belvedere auf dem Pfingstberg, Potsdam
- An area between Pfingstberg and Neuer Garten, Potsdam
- Southern shore of the Jungfernsee, Potsdam
- Königswald (King's Forest, forests surrounding Palace and Park of Sacrow), Potsdam
- Approaches to Babelsberg Park, Potsdam
- Observatory in Babelsberg, Potsdam

== See also ==
- List of castles in Berlin and Brandenburg
- List of sights of Potsdam
- Oranienburg Palace
- Paretz Palace
- Königs Wusterhausen Castle
- Rheinsberg Palace and Park
