= Glienicke Palace =

Palace in Germany

- Schloss Glienicke
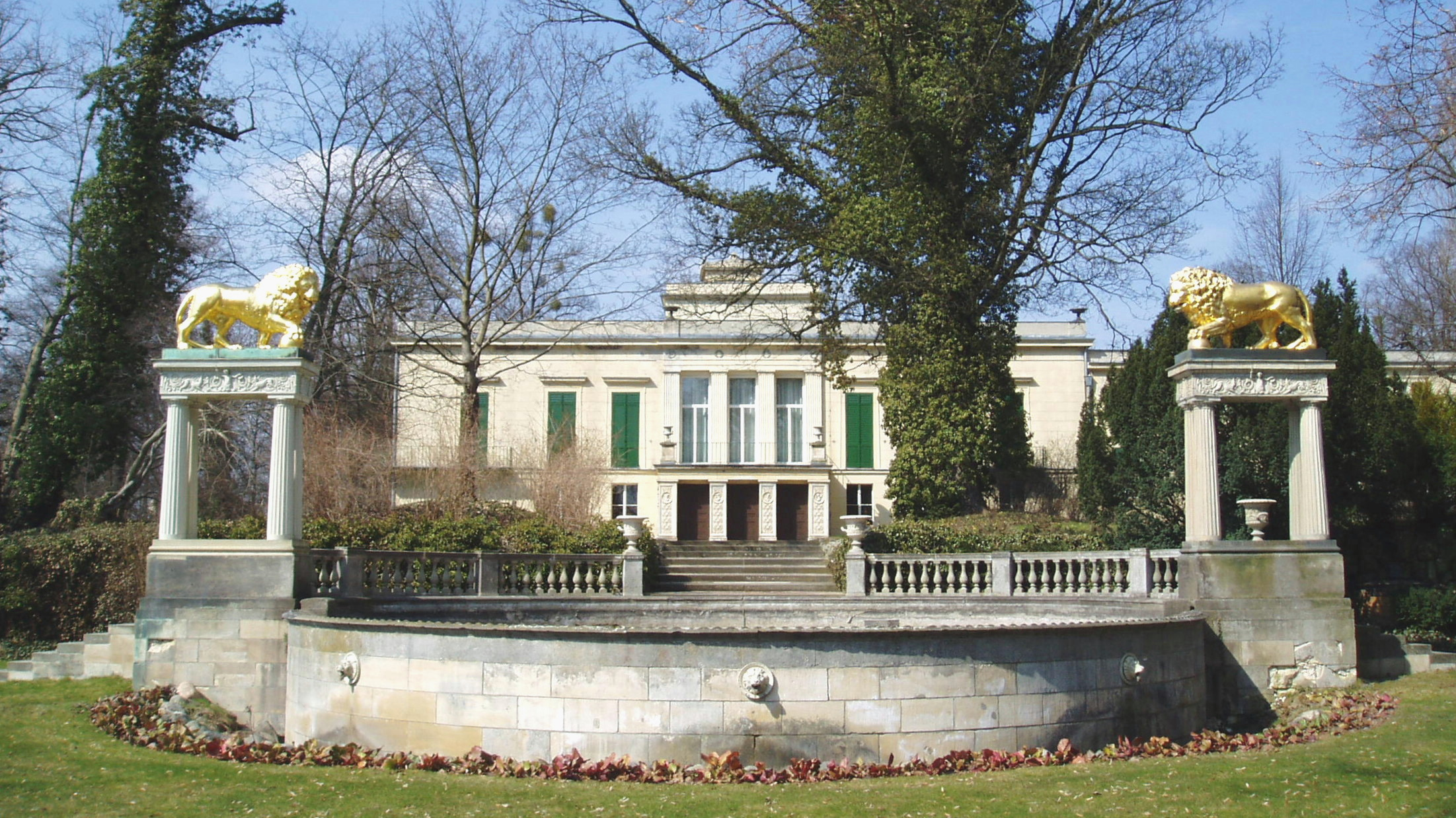
- Glienicke Palace Glienicke Palace in Berlin

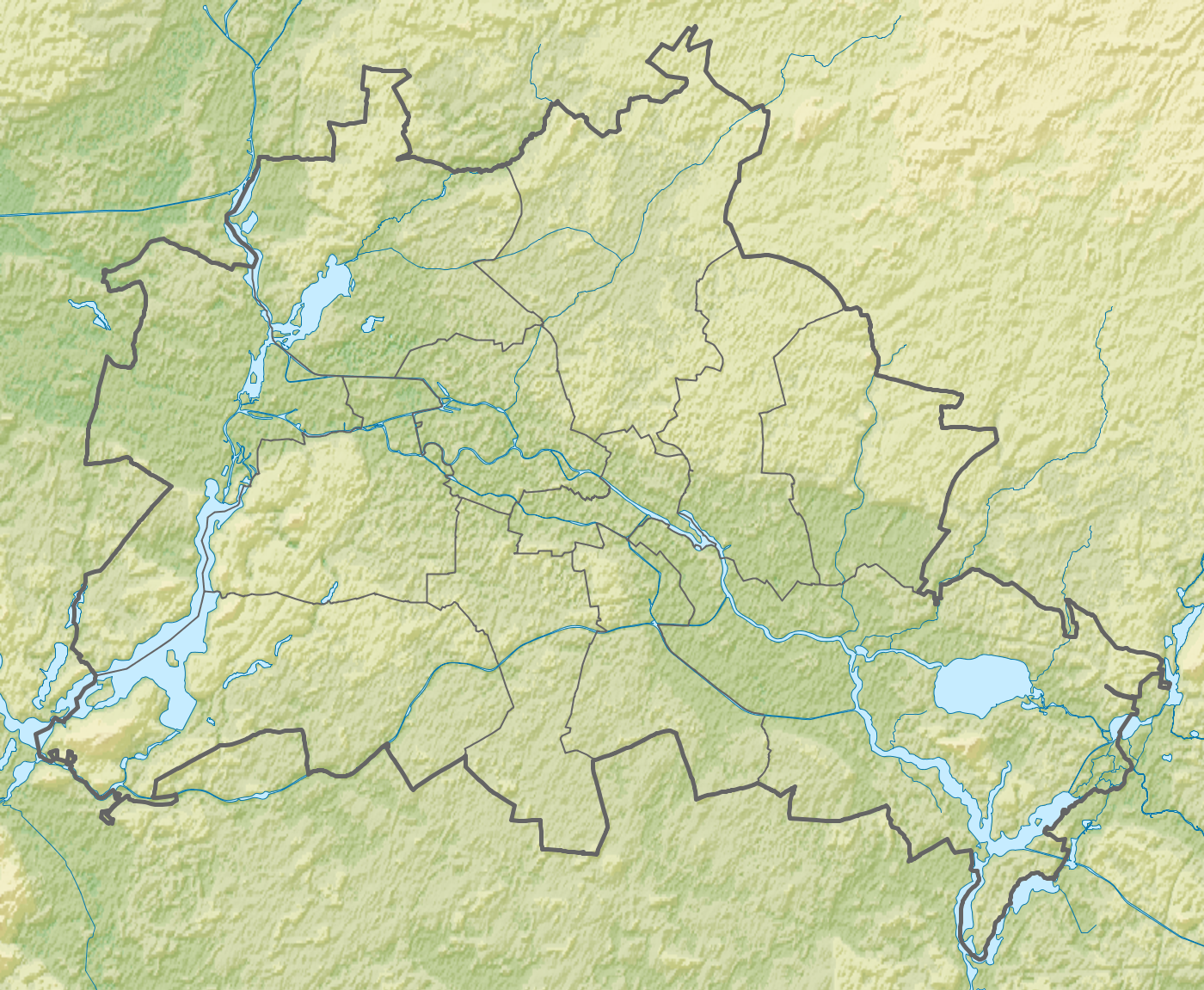
- Location within Germany Location within Berlin

General information
- Type: Palace
- Architectural style: Neoclassical
- Location: Berlin, Germany
- Coordinates: 52.414°N 13.095°E
- Client: Prince Carl of Prussia
- Owner: Stiftung Preußische Schlösser und Gärten Berlin-Brandenburg

Design and construction
- Architect: Karl Friedrich Schinkel

Website
- Official website

UNESCO World Heritage Site
- Part of: Palaces and Parks of Potsdam and Berlin
- Criteria: Cultural: (i)(ii)(iv)
- Reference: 532ter
- Inscription: 1990 (14th Session)
- Extensions: 1992, 1999

Glienicke Palace (German: Schloss Glienicke) is a historic palace located on the peninsula of Berlin-Wannsee in Germany. It was designed by Karl Friedrich Schinkel around 1825 for Prince Carl of Prussia. Since 1990, Glienicke Palace and the park have been part of the UNESCO World Heritage Site "Palaces and Parks of Potsdam and Berlin" because of their unique contribution to Prussian landscape architecture.

== Location ==
The palace is situated near the Glienicke Bridge, on the Bundesstraße 1 across from the Glienicke Hunting Lodge. Around the palace is Park Glienicke.

== History ==
The palace was designed by Karl Friedrich Schinkel for Prince Carl of Prussia. The building, originally merely a cottage, was turned into a summer palace in the late Neoclassical style. Inside the palace were antique objets d'art which Prince Carl of Prussia brought back from his trips.

Particularly striking are two golden lion statues in front of the south frontage, which were also designed by Schinkel. The lions are versions of the "Medici lions" from the Villa Medici in Rome.

The palace is administered by the Stiftung Preußische Schlösser und Gärten Berlin-Brandenburg. The palace's park is now called the Volkspark Glienicke.

== Gallery ==
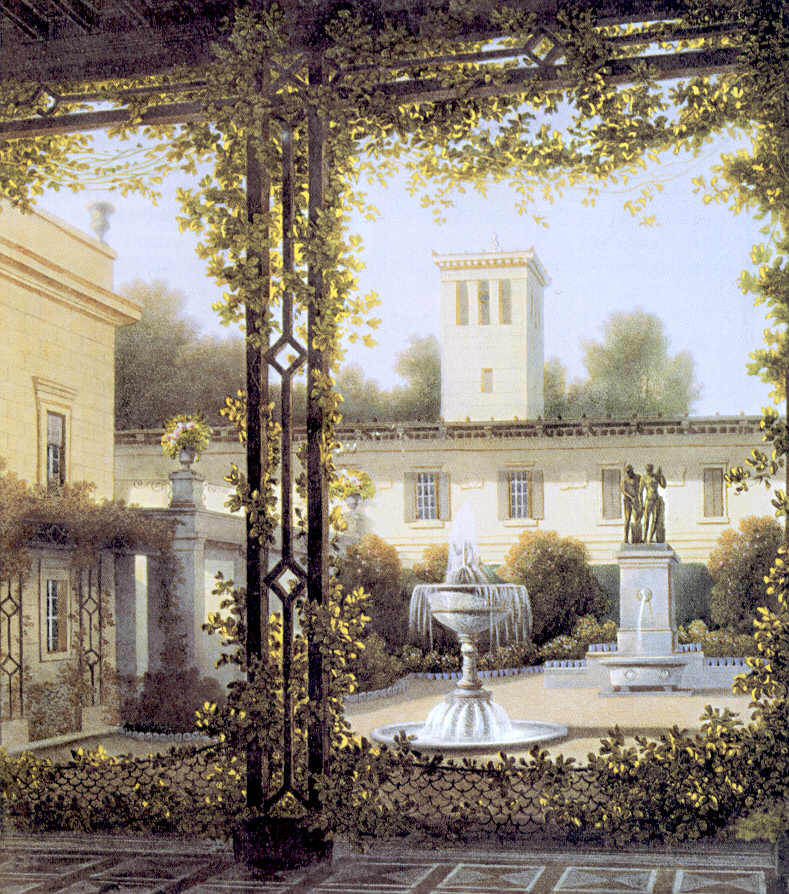
Garden-courtyard in Glienicke (1837) by August C. Haun

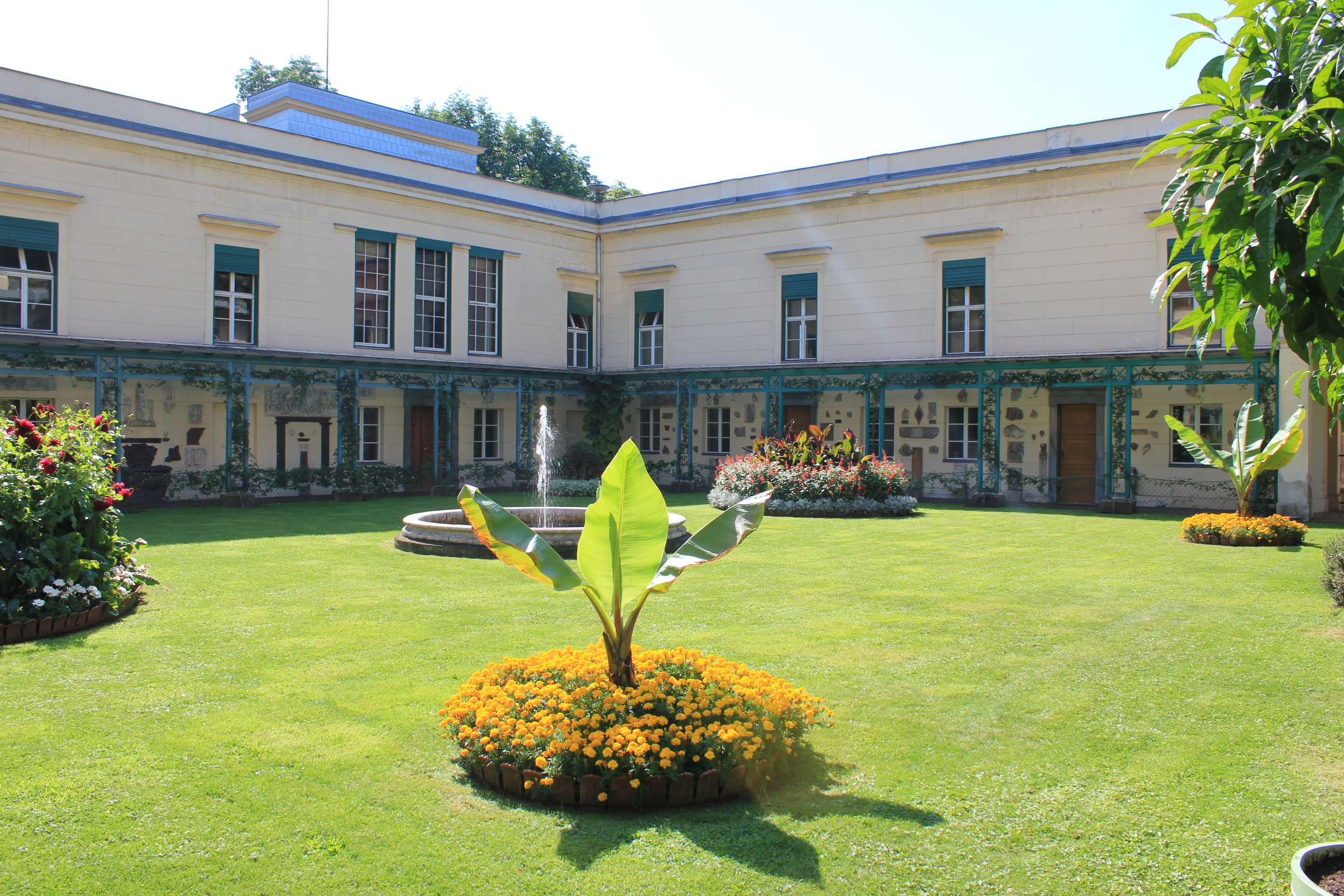
The courtyard of Glienicke Palace

== See also ==
- List of castles in Berlin and Brandenburg
- Palaces and Parks of Potsdam and Berlin
