= Ethos (disambiguation) =

Ethos generally refers to a culture's guiding ideals.

Ethos may also refer to:

- E-Theses Online Service (EThOS), a service of the British Library
- Environmental and Thermal operating systems (ETHOS) Flight Controller, for the International Space Station
- Ethos, a mode of persuasion which appeals to the authority or honesty of a speaker
- Ethos (film), 2011 documentary film hosted by Woody Harrelson
- Ethos (journal) official journal of the Society for Psychological Anthropology (1973–present)
- Ethos (magazine), a biannual UK magazine (2007–14)
- Ethos (TV series), 2020 Turkish thriller drama web television series
- Ethos Books, an independent Singapore-based publisher
- Ethos Water, a brand of bottled water owned by Starbucks
- EthosCE, a learning system
- Ethos Technologies, an American life insurance provider
- "Ethos", a storyline in the science fiction comedy webtoon series Live with Yourself!

== See also ==
- Etos a Dutch retail company
- Etos TV, a proposed German television channel
