= Planning cultures =

Customs and practices in urban and regional planning

Planning cultures are the differing customs and practices in the profession of urban and regional planning that exist around the world. The discourse, models, and styles of communication in planning are adapted to the various local conditions of each community such that planning approaches from one part of the world are not necessarily transferable to other parts of the globe. Planning culture can refer to how planning professionals undertake their practice in a given location, where they are "affected by both individual and collectively shared cognitive frames" that shape their view of the world. Planners, as stated by Simone Abram, are "constantly in the process of actually producing culture". The concept of planning culture also encompasses how planning actually unfolds within a community, as shaped by its culture and influenced by its people. Differing cultural contexts produce different planning and policy responses to issues "bound to specific local (cultural) contexts". Examples of planning cultures include those specific to different countries, regions, and parts of the globe, as well as differing cultures that exist within the same location, such as indigenous planning cultures.

In general, planning cultures evolved throughout the 20th century from a state-centred attempt at city beautification toward a more collaborative process involving the public. This differs depending on local culture; however, as planning in some locations has remained a top-down process where plans are prescribed by senior government (for example, in China). Planning culture requires treatment of different local circumstances and as such, varies around the world. In Canada, planning culture has evolved from its roots influenced by town planning in Great Britain to become a values-based political process that promotes public involvement in an attempt to give agency to various groups, although social inequalities and colonial legacies are still largely present. Indigenous planning culture, which has evolved over hundreds to thousands of years, is another distinct planning culture, within which exists distinct, fluid, and evolving planning cultures that are unique to land, history, and peoples. Today, the reclamation of Indigenous planning cultures has planning in many countries exploring how non-Indigenous and Indigenous planners can work collaboratively toward a reconciliatory, culturally-responsive, and respectful process.

Planning cultures operate within the institutions of their locations. As such, planning cultures play out within the institutional spheres of society, spheres which are consistently evolving and changing in a dynamic response to cultural stimuli. Educational institutions across the world differ in their approach to planning, contributing toward the formation of distinct planning cultures and demonstrating transformations within planning cultures through changing subject matter and emphases.

== Development of planning cultures ==
Planning cultures evolved alongside processes of industrialization and the advancement of societies. Prior to World War II, planning was considered a city beautification movement proposed by architects and politicians. In Europe, with industrialization, planning was conceived as an attempt to provide city leaders with a framework to develop new neighbourhoods and towns outside of the urban core. After World War II, planning expanded from beautification to include many social elements such as economy, history, religion, and public policy. It became understood that such social factors influence how urban infrastructure develops.

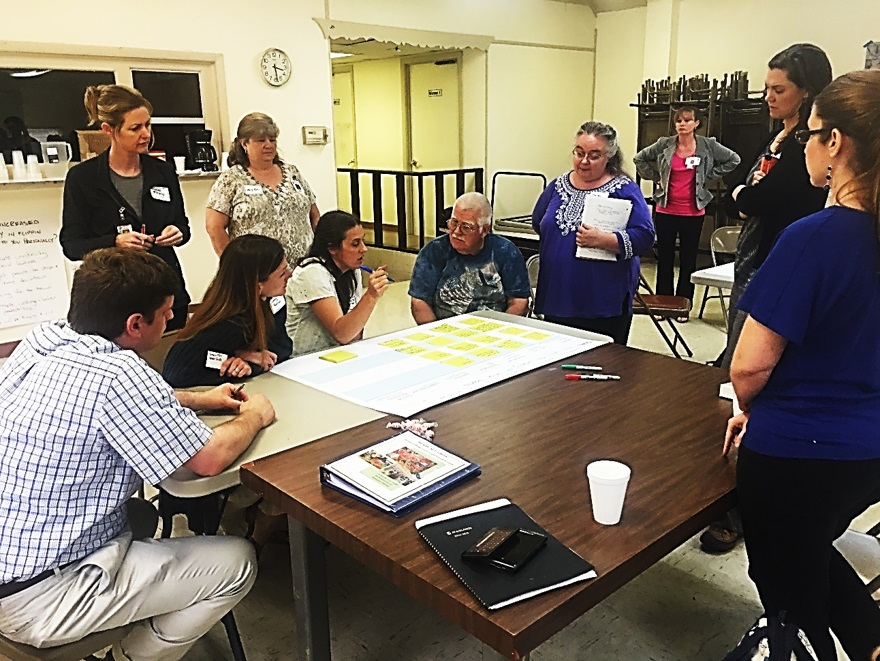
Increasingly, planning cultures are involving the general public throughout the planning process.

The formative years for planning cultures were the 1940s and 1950s, during a global period of rebuilding after World War II. Planning cultures emerged from planning practices as the public became increasingly aware of the impacts of planning. During this period, planners also started to take into consideration the impacts of planning practices on the public. Efforts began to shift from building functional and aesthetic architecture, to analytical and rational development approaches for resolving issues faced by a city or region.

The planning culture in many countries has shifted from a design-centric practice led by a small group of professionals to a much broader social activity involving the general public throughout the process.

Starting in the 1960s, the traditional “top-down” and “state-centered” planning paradigm was criticized as being static and unresponsive in dealing with complex issues at local level. Accordingly, planning practice in many industrialized nations began to shift towards a more “bottom-up” and “people-centered” process. During this transitional period, planning evolved from its original object of providing solutions for specific issues to a more comprehensive goal of addressing socioeconomic challenges. This was an attempt to explore more efficient, flexible, and accountable options for complex problems. As planning culture in industrialized states became more inclusive and aware of issues related to the environment, social equality, multiculturalism, and other non-spatial issues, planners felt it necessary to reflect upon their professional views in order to engage with general public and to search common ground across public in different background and interest groups During the same period, some developing countries maintained their “top-down” paradigm in planning, such as China, Cuba, and Iran, where planning still followed comprehensive national strategies. Since the 1980s, planning practices in those and other developing counties have begun to take different directions.

== Comparing international planning cultures ==
Planning processes and results are highly subject to political influences and institutional structures, which vary significantly around the world. The process of planning involves many stakeholders, although primarily, it is overseen and approved by governments. As such, the largest influences on planning culture are the variables of: constitutional government structures (unitary states, federal states, multinational states), economic structure (market economies, those in transition from command economies), the pace of urban population growth, political culture (involvement of civil society, role of media, competitiveness among parties, openness of political process), and the level of economic development. In all cases, planning institutions are constantly evolving themselves to adapt to new needs and changes. One such broad shift is the embracing of market-led development, where planning institutions now facilitate market forces in an entrepreneurial fashion instead of restraining them. Several examples of planning cultures are presented below, in alphabetical order by country name.

=== Planning culture in Canada ===
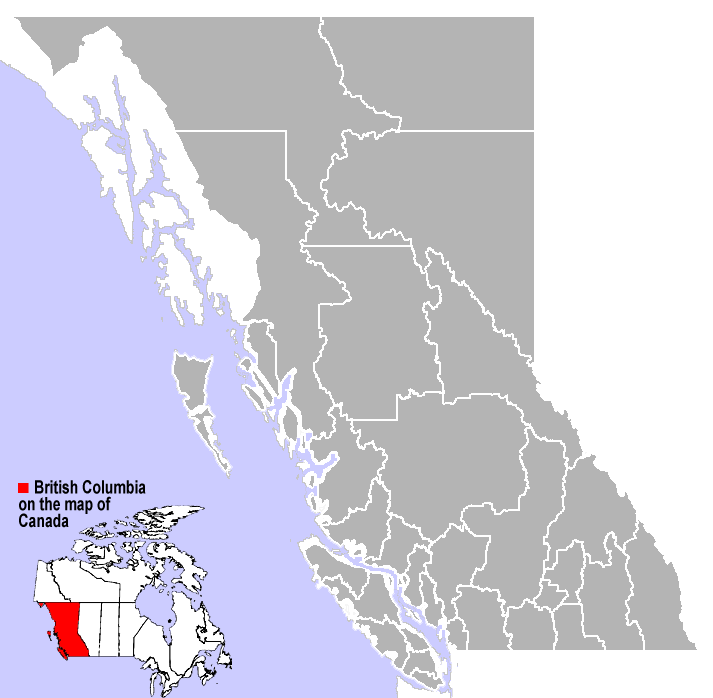
Regional districts in the province of British Columbia are one example of a regional scale at which some planning processes are undertaken in Canada.

Planning culture in Canada is inherently value-laden, and cultural and moral values are important aspects of this practice. Canadian planning culture has been influenced by the planning practices of Great Britain, who partly settled Canada, and by the United States, Canada's neighbour to the South. The culture of planning in Canada has retained its unique identity by focusing on community planning, while Great Britain focuses on town planning, and the United States on urban planning. Canada's legacy as a sparsely populated nation has led to a planning culture that centres on regional planning as a way of tackling disparities between rural and urban areas. The conflict of Canada's regional planning culture lies in the fact that a region can be defined in many different ways. For example, a region could be a large area centred around an urban area, a watershed area, or as an area based on the valley section between mountains.

Combined with the regional approach to planning, the diverse and multicultural nature of the Canadian population has led to some challenges in the way that planning is conducted in Canada. Jill Grant explains that a potential solution to these conflicts that has been adopted by Canadian planners is a planning culture where the professional works proactively to anticipate conflicts and mitigate them before they reach a tipping point. This flexible and proactive approach is useful in Canadian planning culture because it helps balance the needs of different groups living, an often very diverse geographic, political, and social, region to come to positive solutions.

Planning practice is influenced by politics, and in Canada social justice has been incorporated into progressive planning cultures since the 1960s. Social justice in planning has focused on enabling typically under-resourced groups, such as the poor. The legacy of planning in Canada as a form of social justice has permeated to planning schools, including the School of Community and Regional Planning at the University of British Columbia, where agency, democratization, and sustainability are declared to be important values of the curriculum. Participatory planning culture in Canada is in part inspired by Porto Alegre's participatory budget, which has led to a culture of consensus-building, collaboration, and community agency.

Canada's planning culture is rife with colonial legacies and inequalities and this is not forgotten in today's planning culture. Today, planning culture in Canada has evolved to a values-based practice embedded within the political realm that attempts to give agency to various groups by promoting collaboration and conflict resolution.

=== Planning culture in China ===
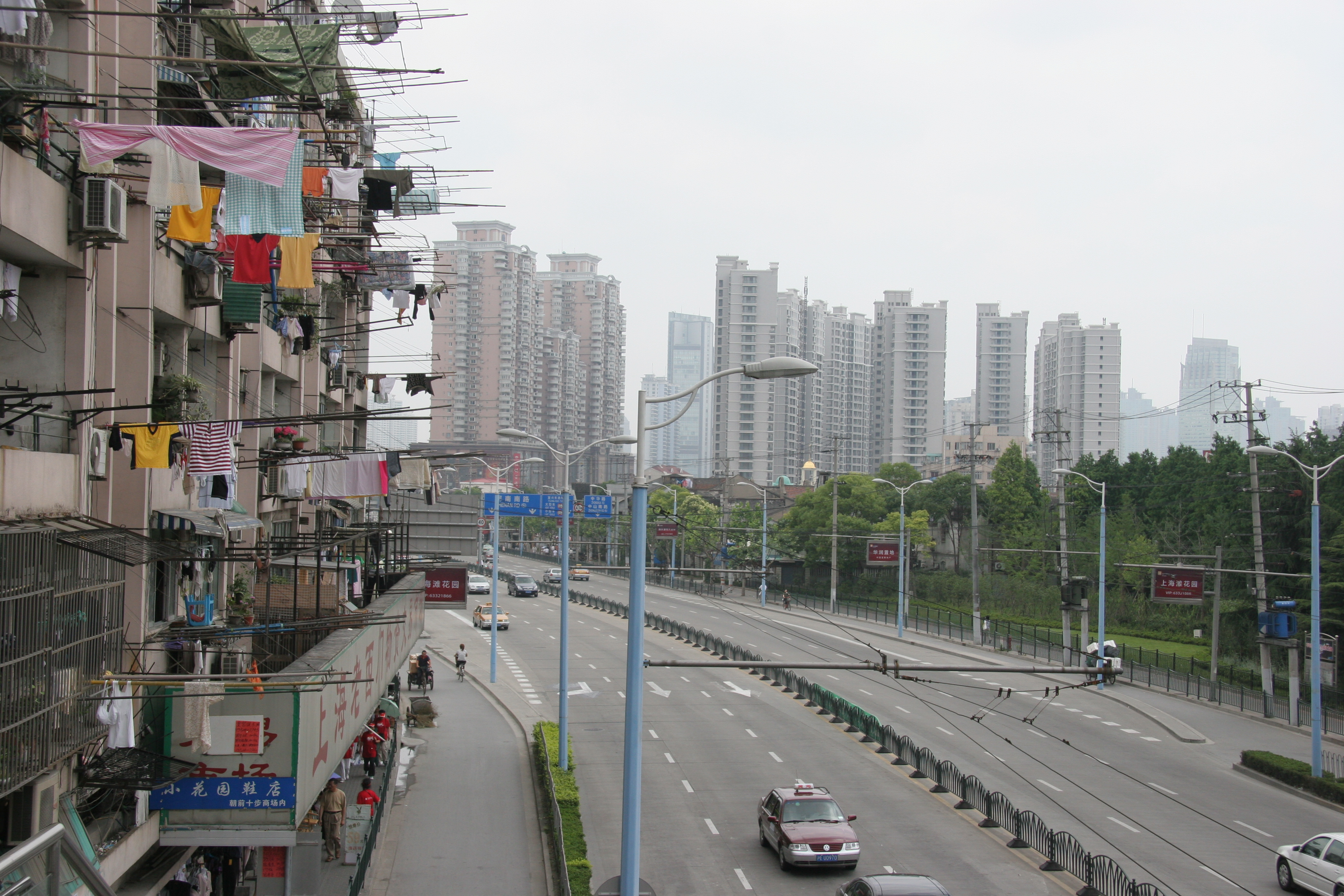
Traffic in Shanghai, China. It is divided into two roads, one serving each direction.

In China, planning activities and planning bureaucracies have expanded significantly in recent decades, with over 60,000 practicing planners in what is now a well-reputed profession. Local development and land use decisions are guided by socio-economic plans developed by senior governments, which in turn are aligned with national 5-year plans. The Ministry of Land and Resources is a vertically integrated organization with branches in every major city that oversees the allocation of land uses and coordinates major projects along with the Ministry of Housing and Urban-Rural Development. This is indicative of planning culture in China, which is characterized by centralization of decision making: for example, Civic Mayors are appointed by higher levels of government. Planning is largely seen as a responsibility of government, with little involvement from civil society. Citizens who take issue with planning decisions may sue the local government, file a petition, or engage in a public demonstration; however, these actions are largely futile. As a result, planners have significant latitude to implement their ideas without inhibition.

=== Planning culture in India ===
Relative to China, planning culture in India is characterized by jurisdictional and administrative autonomy. The civil service in charge of planning is accountable to, yet separate from, the political sphere. Five-year national economic plans guide the direction of development and land use planning at the state and municipal level. With the quadrupling of urban populations over the past 50 years, planning is challenged to keep up with such rapid urbanization. As a result, civil society is still finding its role in balancing planning actors with increasing influence for historically marginalized groups. While planning in India is seen as a vehicle by which to organize and bring significant benefits to society, the planning culture is marred by a socio-economic disconnect between planners and the populations they serve, a highly bureaucratic administration, and the continued marginalization of vast swathes of the urban poor who often live without land rights.

=== Planning culture in Japan ===
In Japan, planning was a large part of the dynastic society throughout the known recent history of Japan. During successive heredity an Emperor or the appointed Shogun had the authority to provide centralized planning for the areas of the country under their control. Individual provinces would report to the authority and power of the central government. After the Meiji Restoration the government developed separated functions and planning functions largely centralized on a regional basis. During the 1990s, local governments were empowered to begin producing urban development Master Plans to guide long-term changes in their jurisdictions. While municipalities were still tied financially to the central government, this change in planning was seen as a major innovation, and one that created a planning culture with increased opportunities for localized public participation.

=== Planning culture in Russia ===
In Russia, prior to the late 1980s, planning was highly centralized and plans were not publicly available. 30-year plans and designs for most areas were produced in government institutes in the largest cities, far removed from the realities where they were to be applied. After the dissolution of the Soviet Union, local governments were rapidly given increased planning responsibility, but did not yet have the tools and structure in place to effectively regulate land use. Significant political, societal, and economic changes in that period of transition further complicated the challenges faced by local planning authorities. Attention was given to addressing these immediate needs, and less to the long-range planning tasks of the Soviet era.

=== Planning culture in South Africa ===
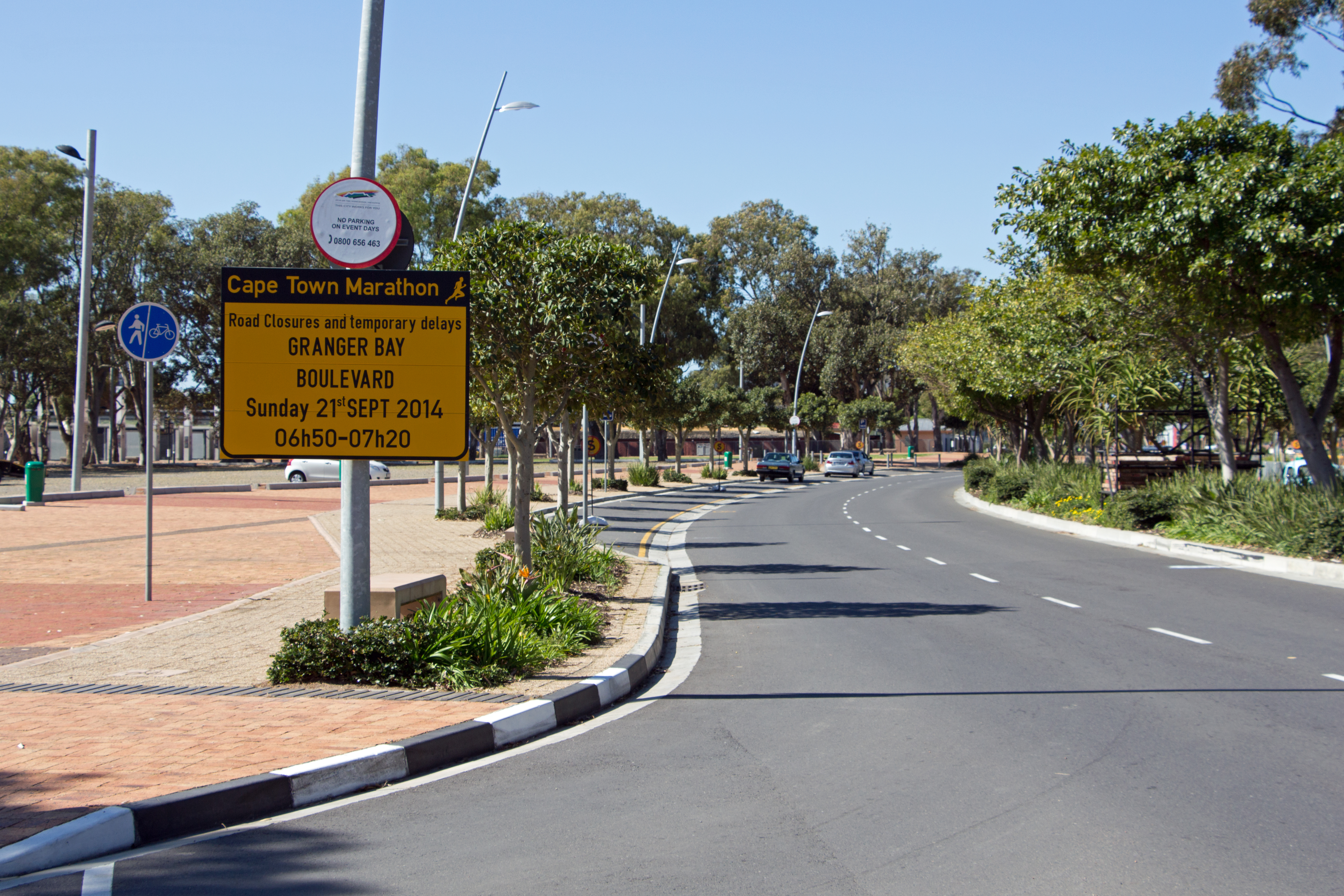
A road sign in South Africa

In sub-Saharan Africa, including the country of South Africa, urban growth rates remain some of the highest in the world due to high birth rates. A severe lack of institutional capacity and financial resources characterizes the context of planning challenges in sub-Saharan states. The planning culture is characterized by a process that focuses in the areas inhabited by urban elites, while the vast majority of urban populations live in informal and squatter settlements, which are technically illegal and beyond the official realm of planning jurisdiction. However, local and national authorities are increasingly directing attention to such settlements, and, combined with foreign financial support, are improving basic infrastructure needs. The precarious nature of these unofficial residential lands limits the ability of residents to obtain services and raise issues with local planning administrations, further maintaining their marginalization. Enforcement of regulations, public participation, and plan execution are notably weak, while nepotism is strong, resulting in much urban development taking place outside of official planning processes.

Studies of planning culture have tended to focus on national scales for comparative analysis; however, a need has been identified to focus on the contextual factors that differentiate planning cultures at the local level. Further research is also needed to understand the underlying forces that affect the core values of planning cultures; while "planning artifacts", such as institutional planning structures, are evident and can be easily compared, intangible aspects of the "social environment" require more thorough examination.

== Indigenous planning cultures ==
Indigenous planning culture is an approach to planning that is both by and for indigenous peoples and is a practice that has evolved over hundreds to thousands of years. Its cultural practice is defined by the sets of traditional knowledges, customs, practices, and cultural identities that are unique to the approximately 350 indigenous peoples worldwide. Indigenous world views ground planning cultures that have evolved and been sustained through time. Indigenous planning is defined by Dr. Theodore (Ted) Jojola as, "both an approach to community planning and an ideological movement. What distinguishes indigenous planning from mainstream practice is its reformulation of planning approaches in a manner that incorporates 'traditional' knowledge and cultural identity. Key to the process is the acknowledgement of an indigenous world-view, which not only serves to unite it philosophically, but also to distinguish it from neighbouring, non land-based communities." Many scholars, practitioners, and community leaders see indigenous planning as a cultural practice of reclaiming traditional and reformulating mainstream planning approaches that are respectful, responsive to, and owned by indigenous communities.

== Planning cultures in transition: institutional transformation ==
According to Sanyal, (p.xxi) "planning cultures are cultures of planning practice. They are the collective ethos and dominant attitudes of professional planners toward the appropriate roles of the state, market forces, and civil society in urban, regional, and national development." As Reimer notes, this ethos refers to the "basic ideas, traditions, and values of planning professionals."

Reimer further suggests that planning cultures are "complex and multi-dimensional institutional matrices comprising formal and informal institutional spheres that need to adapt to ever-changing external and internal circumstances." In this context, planning cultures operate in an institutional setting and any evolution of a planning culture must contend with a "persisting institutional stability". Reimer evaluates planning cultures as "an analytical concept (and not as a normative paradigm in theory and practice)." Planning is embedded and operates in specific cultural contexts, subject to changing planning cultures. This change can be seen as it plays out in institutional spheres, a form of social transformation. Institutional change can be theorized as a process comprising seven stages: equilibrium, shock event, deinstitutionalization, preinstitutionalization, theorization, diffusion, and reinstitutionalization.

Transitions in planning cultures can also be seen in the style and focus of education programs for new planners. Traditionally, planning was closely aligned with architecture and engineering; this is evidenced in planning programs in continental Europe, which emphasize urban design and land use planning. In North America, the United Kingdom, and select European countries, the breadth of planning subject matter in education has expanded and directs more attention to environmental sustainability and social justice, while also focusing on built form and land regulation. Planning programs are evolving to train planners to be more creative, innovative, and collaborative. Such skills are essential to meet the increasing challenges faced by planning, for which traditional methods will not suffice. In unprecedented, uncertain, and unstable times, adaptation of planning cultures is seen as key to their efficacy.

The foundation of Anglo-American planning values has long been guided by a yearning to implement utopian ideals. This starts with planning institutions where academics and practitioners practice, where institutional reform is a constant focus. By reforming institutions, planners believe they can improve core issues in the practice and process of planning.

== See also ==
- Theories of urban planning
- History of urban planning
- Category:Urban planning by country
