= Indigenous planning =

Indigenous planning (or Indigenous community planning) is an ideological approach to the field of regional planning where planning is done by Indigenous peoples for Indigenous communities. Practitioners integrate traditional knowledge or cultural knowledge into the process of planning. Indigenous planning recognizes that "all human communities plan" and that Indigenous communities have been carrying out their own community planning processes for thousands of years. While the broader context of urban planning, and social planning includes the need to work cooperatively with indigenous persons and organizations, the process in doing so is dependent on social, political and cultural forces.

As there are many Indigenous cultures, practices and planning within Indigenous communities vary greatly.

== Overview ==
Indigenous planning has a broader and more comprehensive scope than mainstream or Western planning, and is not limited to land use planning or physical development. Indigenous planning is comprehensive and can address all aspects of community life through community development, including the social and environmental aspects that impact the lives of community members.

Indigenous planning for land and resources can be understood as transformative planning as it addresses complex issues of Indigenous sovereignty, self-government, and self-determination. Indigenous planning can also be understood as a form of insurgent planning, as it provides an avenue for communities to confront and address their own oppression. Indigenous planning is often a tool which allows for Indigenous communities to regain control over resources and exercise maintenance of their culture and political autonomy.

The scope of Indigenous planning can be seen to cover three broad areas: Indigenous communities, urban Indigenous communities, land and resource planning.

== History ==
Indigenous peoples have been planning their communities for thousands of years, often referred to as 'since time immemorial'. However, planning as a technical and colonial tool has historically been used as a means to dispossess Indigenous communities through the re-appropriation of traditional territories for non-Indigenous profit and development. While Indigenous community planning is historically based upon managing interactions with the natural world, it now also focuses on interactions with non-Indigenous actors as well. In the political sense, this means fighting for and receiving legitimization and empowerment in leadership positions that were stripped from them through colonization. As such, Indigenous planning has re-emerged as a reaction to Western planning, which was historically used as a colonial tool, for example through the reserve system in Canada.

Indigenous planning emerged as a planning culture and field of practice during the mid-20th century within the context of modern planning and imperialism, however, Indigenous groups have been planning their own urban spaces for as long as they have existed. It is a continually evolving practice and spans (but is contextually unique to) Indigenous communities around the world. According to John Friedmann, Indigenous planning emerged as a formalized field in relation to mainstream planning in 1992 at a MIT conference through the creation of a theory of action that was based on long-term learning, local planning and shared culture. Three years later, in 1995, the Indigenous Planning Network was created under the American Planning Association (APA). The division is currently called Indigenous Planning (IP).

Contemporary Indigenous planning practices are particularly prevalent in New Zealand, Australia, Canada, and the United States (countries with large Indigenous populations and colonial histories). Histories of colonization have significantly impacted Indigenous communities and their planning cultures. International colonial processes are complex, divergent, and context specific. The large scale and ongoing impacts of these processes include but are not limited to: dispossession from land and retrenchment of decision-making power, intergenerational trauma, systematic racism, and disruptions of local and traditional cultural systems. Taiaiake Alfred asserts that it is essential to differentiate between Indigenous and Western planning cultures that are implicated within colonial legacies. Generally, Western planning cultures have tended to value linear systems of rationality, with power structures that dominate and suppress those cultures that do not share these value systems. Since colonization processes took place throughout the world, Indigenous planning cultures were largely ignored and actively disrupted as they were seen as impediments to western civilisation and progress. The culture of Indigenous planning is described as a movement where Indigenous communities, planners, academics, governments, institutions, and leaders, resist colonial and neo-colonial planning traditions as well as work towards increasing protections of rights, freedoms, and sovereignty for Indigenous peoples.

== Principles ==
Some of the key principles of Indigenous planning that are distinguishable from 'mainstream' or Western planning approaches, are its recognition and incorporation of traditional knowledge, cultural identity, customary law, and Indigenous world-views. As collective land-based peoples, land tenure and stewardship are at the core of Indigenous planning paradigms. Instead of regulating private land use, as western planning does, indigenous communities see land as a birthright that belongs to everyone, passed down through generations. Because of this belief, keeping the lands productivity stable for the next generation is a large component of Indigenous planning. Also in line with this belief, and a unique aspect of indigenous planning, are the countless indigenous technologies that work to foster a positive human relationship with the environment, as well as ensure present and future human symbiosis with nature.

Indigenous communities everywhere have sustained and developed distinct, fluid and evolving planning cultures that are unique to land, history, and peoples. These cultural planning practices include land stewardship, resource management, community planning, and intergenerational learning transfers such as traditional ecological knowledge. Indigenous planning cultures often hold traditional governance structures, including: matrilineal heritage or consensus based decision making; self-reliance and resiliency; and, reciprocity and ceremony. Complex relationships with time exist, with strong emphases on cyclical patterns, such as nature-human relational processes and the Seven Generation Sustainability methodology. Strength-based practices and wellness planning lenses are employed, rather than a negative or weakness based assessment framework. Many of these Indigenous cultures evoke particular planning methods, including: Transformational Planning, Participatory Planning, Therapeutic Planning, Cultural Humility, and Reconciliation.

The Indigenous planning culture is an intersectional, placed-based approach and political movement that is shaping western and mainstream urban planning cultures. Paullette Regan discusses the process of changing Canadian planning culture through the efforts of non-Indigenous Canadians to decolonize their personal beliefs and behaviours. Ryan Walker and Hiringi Matunga use case studies from Canada and New Zealand to discuss how planners might be able to re-situate Indigenous and mainstream planning cultures as a partnership in urban contexts. The reclamation of Indigenous planning cultures challenges western planning assumptions and many planners worldwide are questioning how non-indigenous and indigenous planners can work collaboratively towards planning practices that are reconciliatory, respectful, creative and culturally responsive.

Some Canadian First Nations engage in Indigenous planning through an approach known as Comprehensive Community Planning (CCP). CCP is a community-led and community-owned process. As a planning exercise, CCP takes a holistic and long-term approach that considers all aspects of the community, for example: housing, health, culture, economy, land use, resources, education, language revitalization and governance. CCP can also be a way for Indigenous communities to engage formally with government organizations who provide external resources and funding for First Nations projects. Comprehensive Community Plans are living documents designed to reflect and respond to the changing priorities and goals of the community.

In the United States in 1995, a grassroots movement with the ideals of the new theory of indigenous planning established 5 basic principles of indigenous planning. The principles established are; people thrive in community, ordinary people have all the answers, people have a basic right to determine their own future, oppression continues to be a force that devastates people, and the people are beautiful, already.

== Indigenous planning in practice ==
=== Africa ===
==== The Edo People (also called the Benin People) ====
The city of Benin has been thriving since before it was ransacked by a British punitive raid in 1897. Before the raid, the city was ordered according to family groupings. The city nonetheless survived and is home to more than a million people today.

=== Asia ===
==== The Lao People ====
Laos' Northern Provinces relies on the economic activity of swidden farming and raising livestock, which due to many complicated factors, is currently not sustainable and causing periods of food insecurity and lack of economic funds. To alleviate these problems and prevent future worsening of the problem, the Northern Region Sustainable Livelihoods Development Project uses "participatory livestock development," which will in turn help the surrounding ecosystems.

=== North America ===
==== The Syilx People ====
The En'owkinwixw process is a traditional method of facilitating "collective learning and community decision-making" used by Syilx communities in Okanagan, British Columbia. The CCP for the Penticton Indian Band is an example of the En'owkinwixw process in action. The process emphasizes inclusion and equal voice in community consultation to create a common guiding framework that is culturally relevant.

==== The Oneida Nation ====
In the 1995 American Planning Association's Chicago conference, indigenous planning emerged in academic planning circles, largely pushed by the people of the Oneida Nation. The conference resulted in the Indigenous Planning Network (IPN), a division in the American Planning Association.

==== The Blackfeet Nation ====
Mark Magee, a planner for the Blackfeet Nation (or Amskapi Pikani), describes the difficulties that arise from jurisdictional issues, a common theme in indigenous planning. Policies from the federal, state, and county levels often conflict with indigenous ideals, which can be hard to overcome. Currently, the planners are working on a project to bring bison back to their land, to restore both the ecosystem, and their old cultural way of life that includes bison. There is also a land buy-back program aimed at returning private, non-native owned lands to the Blackfeet Nation, which was successful in regaining 324 thousand acres of land.

=== Oceania ===
==== Indigenous Australians ====
In Australia, land councils are regional organizations representing Indigenous Australians. While the primary function is to advocate for traditional land rights, the work of many land councils extends to community development plans and programs, which focus on the economic, social and cultural well-being of Indigenous Australians.

==== The Maori People ====
The Maori in New Zealand practice Iwi Management Planning, which provides a framework for tribes to define their past and present, and prescribe "management, planning and decision-making processes to guide iwi toward their concept of self-determination". Iwi management planning and its associated policies and approaches are examples of indigenous planning done by and for Maori communities. Furthermore, Maori iwi management planning is a planning tradition that has a history that predates colonization and any ensuing acts or treaties. Contemporary Maori planning practiced today can be seen as a "dual planning tradition" where the nature of planning in the context of colonization continues to evolve while remaining grounded in Maori tradition and philosophy.

==== The Hawaiian People ====
In Hawai'i there is a trend towards the traditional Ahupuaʻa concept of land management, particularly with watershed planning.

=== South America ===
==== The Kamëntšá Biyá People ====
In 2010, the Kamëntšá won the rights to their land, which lies in the Sibundoy Valley of present-day Colombia. After this preliminary step that came after decades of disposition by colonialism, they legally regained 20% of their ancestral lands. Their land use visions center primarily around the cosmos and public health, two very important aspects of their culture. In order to protect those interests, protection of watersheds and ecosystems with traditional medicinal plants are high on the people's' priority list.

== Academic programs ==
Several planning schools have incorporated Indigenous planning focuses into their curriculum. Some build relationships with Indigenous communities on whose lands they exist. For example, the University of British Columbia, School of Community and Regional Planning maintains a partnership with the Musqueam Indian Band. Planning schools which offer Indigenous planning curricula are often interested in updating professional planning education and practice through approaches involving the native ideals and perspectives of decolonization and reflexivity.

Academic institutions with Indigenous planning-focused curricula include:

- James Cook University (Graduate Certificate of Planning and Indigenous Communities)
- University of Auckland (Bachelor of Urban Planning (Honours) - Māori urban planning)
- University of British Columbia (School of Community and Regional Planning - Indigenous Community Planning program)
- University of New Mexico (School of Architecture and Planning - Indigenous Design and Planning Institute)
- University of Northern British Columbia (School of Environmental Planning - First Nations planning specialization)
- University of Saskatchewan (Bachelor of Arts - Community Planning and Native Studies)
- Vancouver Island University (Master of Community Planning - First Nations planning focus area)
- University of Manitoba (Department of City Planning - Indigenous Planning Studio)
- University of Waterloo (Department of Planning - Indigenous Peoples and Community Planning - Special topic course)

== See also ==
- Aboriginal peoples in Canada
- Architecture
- Environmental planning
- Indian Americans
- Indigenous peoples
- Indigenous Australians
- Local economic development
- Māori people
- Participatory planning
- Planning cultures
- Strategic planning
- Urban planner
- Urban planning
- Urban planning education
- Urban planning in Australia
- Urban planning in the United States
