= Roman Baths (Potsdam) =

Coordinates: 52°23′52″N 13°01′42″E

The Roman Baths (German: die Römischen Bäder), situated northeast of the Charlottenhof Palace in the Sanssouci Park in Potsdam, reflect the Italiensehnsucht ("Sehnsucht/longing for Italy") of its creator Frederick William IV of Prussia. Various classical Roman and antique Italian styles were melded into an architectural ensemble, created between 1829 and 1840.

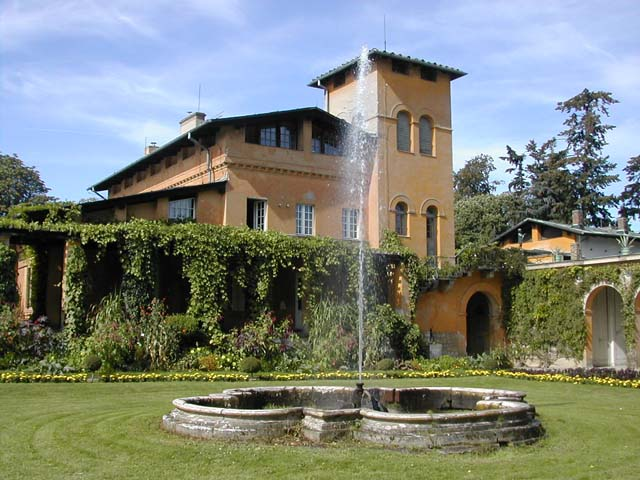
Gardener's house (center) and the entry to the Roman Baths (far right)

== Design ==
While still crown prince, Frederick William commissioned both Charlottenhof (1826-1829) and the Roman Baths (1834-1840). Coming up with numerous ideas and drawing many actual drafts, the artistically inclined heir to the throne had considerable influence on the plans of the architect, Karl Friedrich Schinkel. Charged with managing the actual construction was one of Schinkel's students, Ludwig Persius.

== Style ==
The gardener's house (Gärtnerhaus) (1829–30) and the adjacent house for the gardener's helpers (Gärtnergehilfenhaus) (1832) were both built in Italian country villa style (Landhausstil). The Roman Bath, which gave its name to the ensemble in its entirety, was styled after ancient villas. Together with a small tea pavilion (Teepavillon) (1830), modelled on temples of classical antiquity, they form a complex of buildings tied together by pergolas, arcades and garden spaces. The individual buildings were largely inspired by Schinkel's second trip to Italy in 1828. Thus the Roman Bath, which has never actually been used as a bathing facility, came into being thanks purely to the romantic fantasy of the royal Italophile.

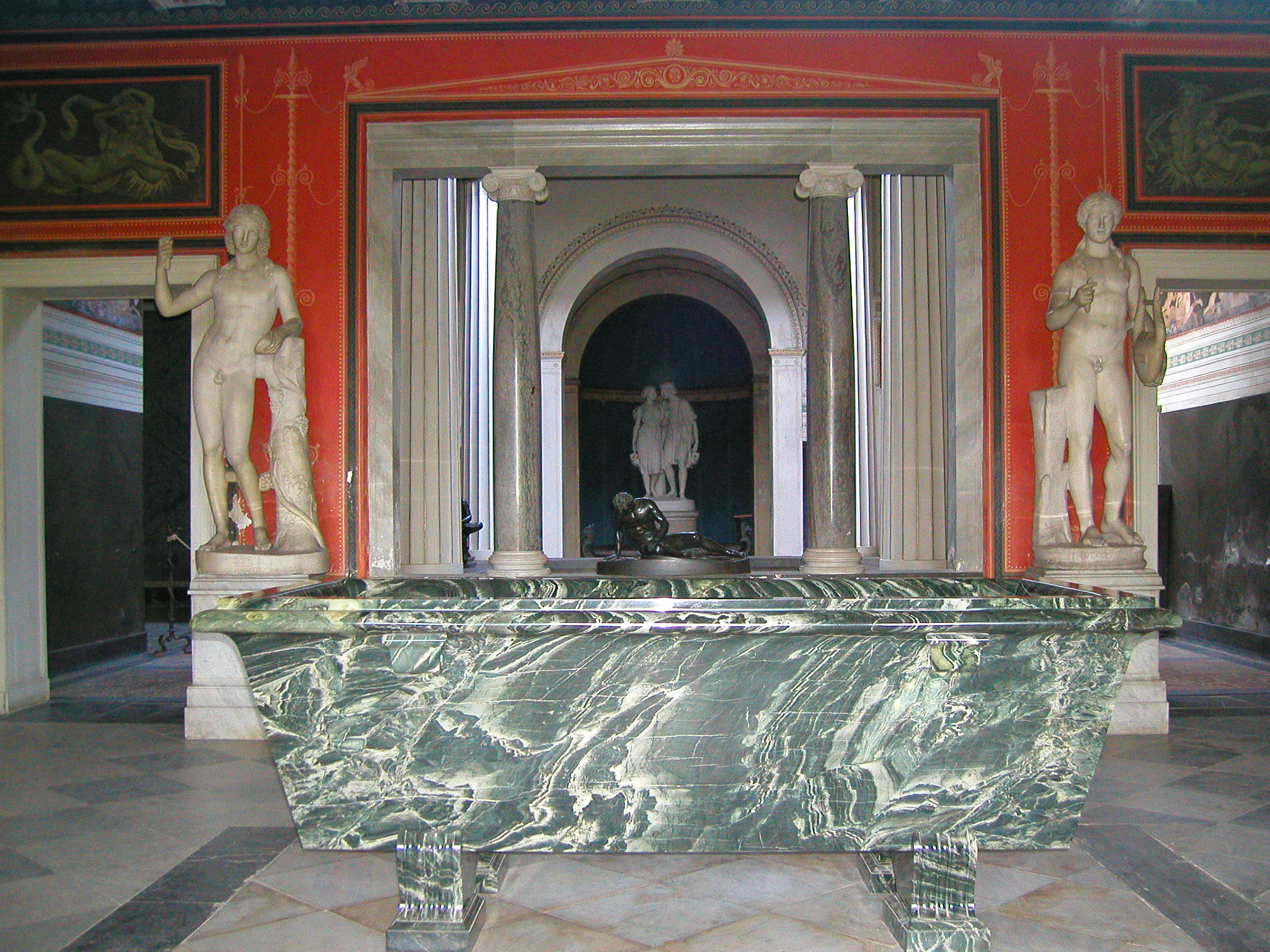
Atrium of the Roman Baths with a decorative tub of green jasper (a gift of Czar Nicholas I)

The names of the rooms connote a mixture of antique villas and Roman baths. The atrium, the courtyard of a Roman house, is the reception area. The Impluvium, actually only a glorified rainwater-collection device, gives its name to the whole room in which it is located. The Viridarium (greenhouse) is actually a small garden. Additional names associated with Roman thermal baths are Apodyterium for the changing room and Caldarium.

== Location ==
The whole nostalgic creation is on the bank of an artificial lake created during Peter Joseph Lenné's landscaping of the Charlottenhof grounds. The so-called machine pond (Maschinenteich) gets its name from a steam engine building and an adjacent pumping station torn down in 1923. The large hull of a well marks the location of the former building. The steam engine was not just responsible for keeping the artificial waters of Charlottenhof moving – its smokestacks were also a symbol of progress and what was at its time advanced technology.
