= Heinrich Strack =

German architect (1805–1880)

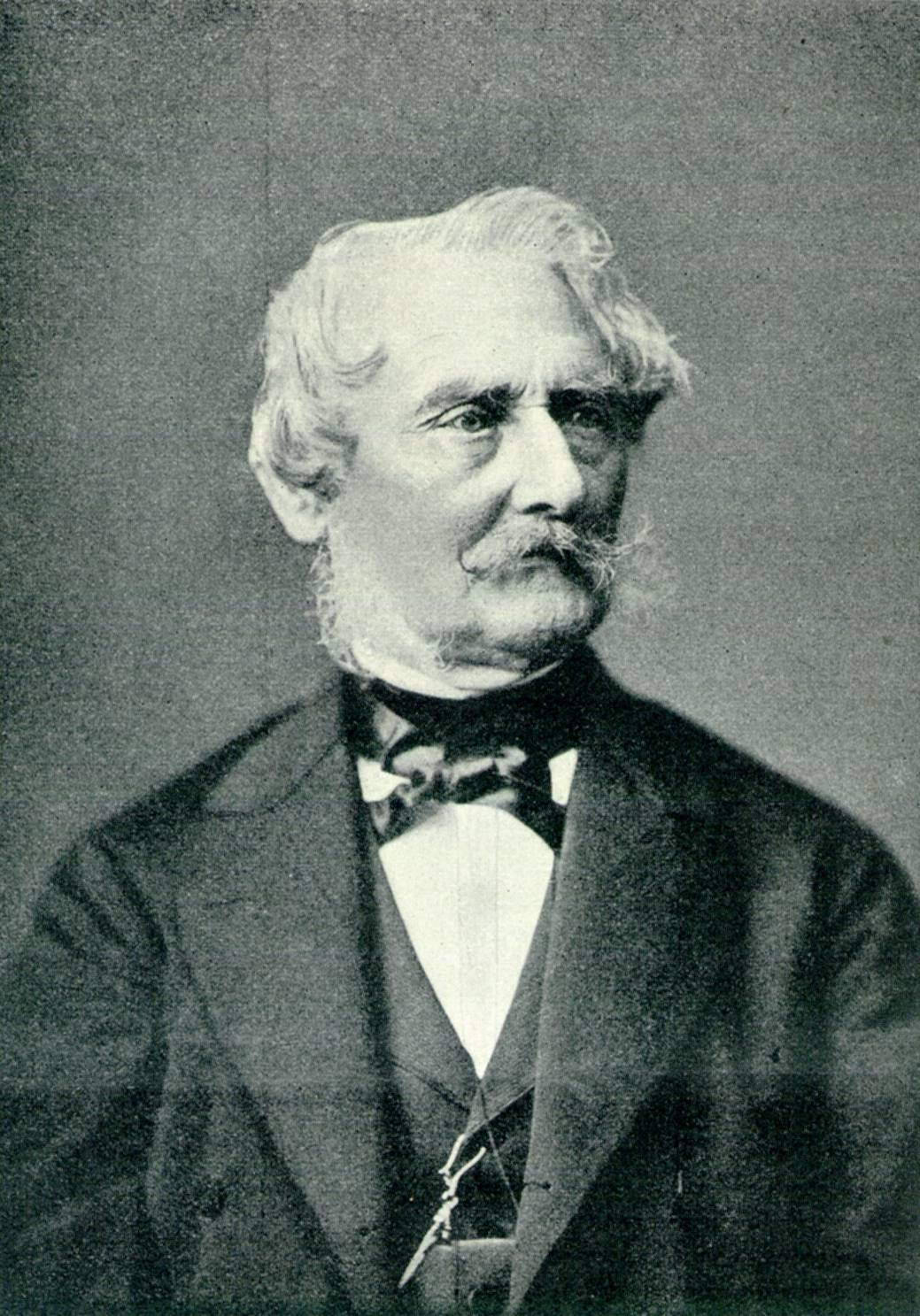
Heinrich Strack

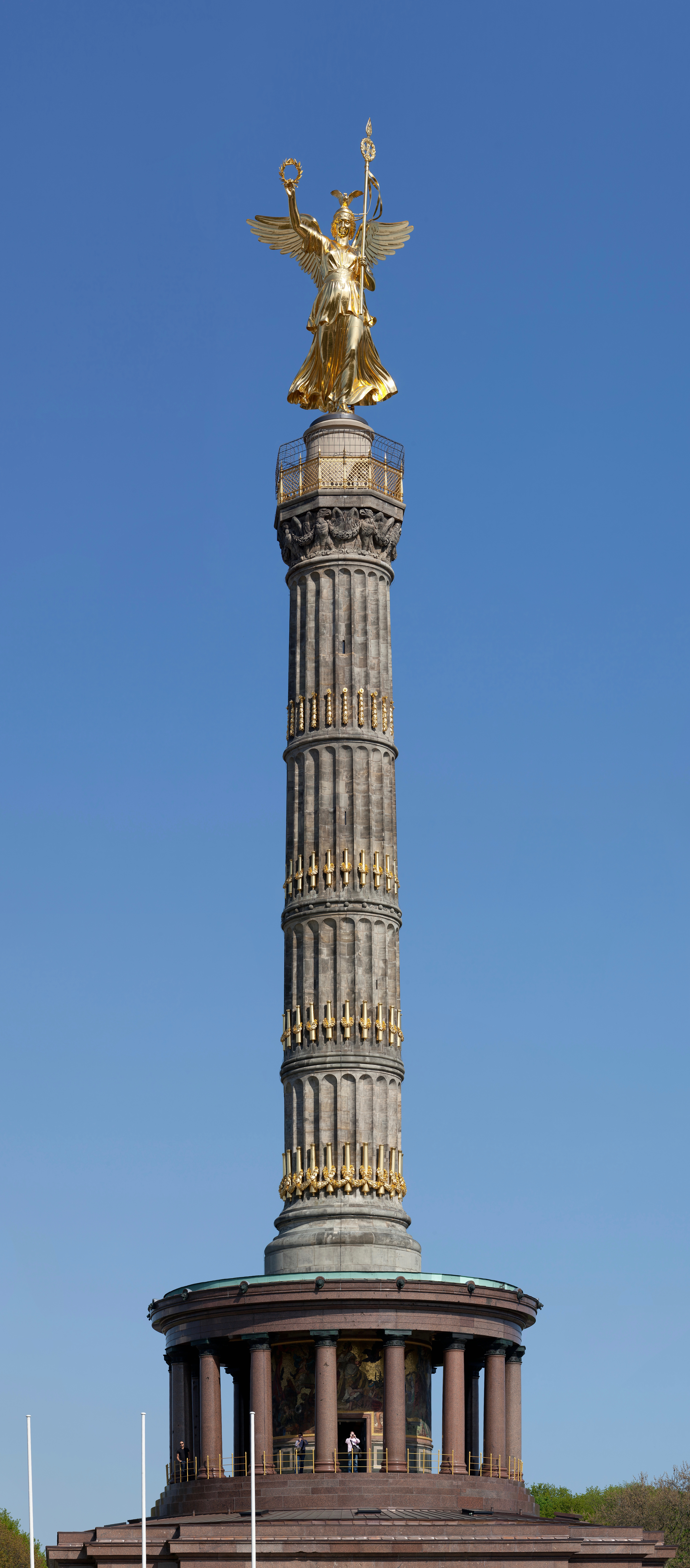
The Berlin Victory Column; statue by Friedrich Drake

Johann Heinrich Strack (6 July 1805, Bückeburg – 13 June 1880, Berlin) was a German architect of the Schinkelschule. His notable works include the Berlin Victory Column.

== Life and work ==
His father, Anton Wilhelm Strack, was a painter of portraits and vedute. His mother's brother was Johann Heinrich Tischbein, a famous portrait and history painter. Between 1824 and 1838, he studied at both the Bauakademie and the Prussian Academy of Arts. During that time, he passed the surveyor's examination (1825), the construction manager examination (1827) and the Master Builder's examination (1838), which qualified him to be an inspector.

He also assisted Karl Friedrich Schinkel, furnishing an apartment for Crown Prince Friedrich Wilhelm at the Berliner Schloss; and Friedrich August Stüler, in renovating the Ordenspalais. The latter resulted in a lifetime friendship. His first independent employment was as a construction manager, for renovating the Prinz-Albrecht-Palais (1829–1830). He worked as an freelance manager and architect from 1832 to 1837.

He began teaching at the Prussian Academy in 1839, and was appointed a Professor there in 1841. The following year, he became a building inspector for the Court, in service to then-Prince Wilhelm. In 1850, he became a member of the new "Technical Building Deputation". He succeeded Stüler as a Professor at the Bauakademie in 1854. He also taught drawing to Wilhelm's son, Friedrich, and accompanied him on a trip to Italy.

In 1862, during excavations in Athens, Strack, Ernst Curtius and Karl Bötticher discovered the Theatre of Dionysus, near the Acropolis. Three years later, he was accepted as a foreign member of the Académie des Beaux-Arts, and began writings texts on architectural subjects. When he retired in 1876, then-Emperor Wilhelm I appointed him "Architect to the Emperor".

His tomb at Dorotheenstadt Cemetery was designed by two of his students; Reinhold Persius and Julius Emmerich.

== Selected works ==
- 1845–1849: Babelsberg Palace, completion after the death of Ludwig Persius
- 1854: Refurbishment of the Old Palace, Unter den Linden, Berlin
- 1853–1856: St. Andrew's Church, formerly Stralauer Platz, Friedrichshain
- 1856–1858: Expansion of the Kronprinzenpalais, Unter den Linden, Berlin
- 1867–1868: Gatehouses of the Brandenburg Gate
- 1869–1873: Berlin Victory Column, now in Großer Stern in the Tiergarten in Berlin
- 1866–1875: Construction of the Alte Nationalgalerie, Berlin
- 1853–1856: Flatow Tower in Babelsberg Park
- 1870/1871: Redesign of the Berlin Gerichtslaube in the park of Babelsberg Palace

== Sources ==
- Hermann Arthur Lier (1893). "Johann Heinrich Strack". Allgemeine Deutsche Biographie (in German). Vol. 36. Leipzig: Duncker & Humblot. pp. 484–485.
- Franz Jahn, Hans Vollmer; "Strack, Johann Heinrich", In: Allgemeines Lexikon der Bildenden Künstler von der Antike bis zur Gegenwart, Vol. 32: Stephens–Theodotos, E. A. Seemann, Leipzig, 1938
- Wochenschrift d. Architekten-Vereins zu Berlin, Vol.2, 1907, Heymanns
