= Sociotope =

A sociotope is a defined space that is uniform in its use values and social meanings (compare with biotope). It can be described as the collective life world of a place (Greek: topos, 'place' from tópos koinós, common place; pl. topoi), its use and meaning, in a specific culture or group of people (Latin: socio).

The sociotope can be defined in the real world (geography) or in virtual reality (cyberspace). It is shaped by a multiplicity of lifestyles connected to a specific place and it can be categorized as more or less local (or global). Sociotope is related to urban sociologist Manuel Castells concept "space of place" and how it connects to "the space of flows". Example: Times Square in New York is a global sociotope which is used for social interaction, traffic and shopping. Tegnérlunden (small park) in Stockholm, Sweden is a local sociotope which is used for recreation, social interaction and children's play.

It is not clear who first defined the word sociotope but it is set in anthropology and sociology. The German sociologist Michael Rutschky is supposed to have used the term in the field of milieu research in 1982. Tino Bargel and other have used it before (1978) with regard to the environment conditions of the socialisation process. The Swedish social psychologist Lars Dencik used the word 1989 to describe the social life world (network) of children. The German historian Hasso Spode spoke of a "sociotope" (Soziotop) in 1994 in order to analyze the special sociocultural composition of the Berlin district of Kreuzberg. The German anthropologist Elisabeth Katching-Fasch used the word in 1998 to describe "the city as a "sociotope" of multicultural lifestyles. The German landscape architect Werner Nohl has used it to desbribe social types of urban settings. The word has recently been extensively used in Sweden for urban planning practise. The first sociotope map was made for the open spaces of Stockholm city in 2000 by landscape architect Alexander Ståhle at the Urban Planning Administration. The map shows how squares and green areas are used and if they are local or regional. The map is a tool for urban planning and design.

== Related Articles ==
- Urban planning
- Biotope
