= Aire de mise en valeur de l'architecture et du paysage =

An aire de mise en valeur de l'architecture et du patrimoine (also AVAP or AMVAP) is a French urban planning regulation built and spatial heritage. The law creating the AMVAP was passed on July 12, 2010 with the Grenelle II law. They replaced the zones de protection du patrimoine architectural, urbain et paysager, and older ones would be replaced before 14 July 2015.
