= Reinhold Persius =

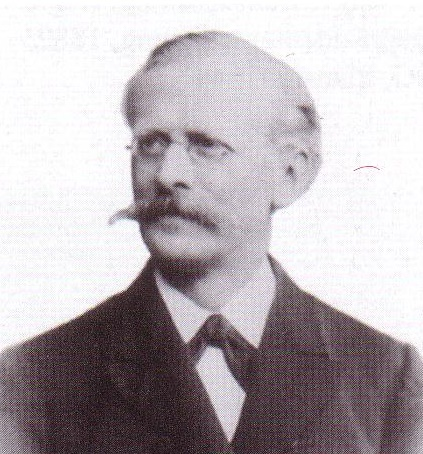
Reinhold Persius (before 1900)

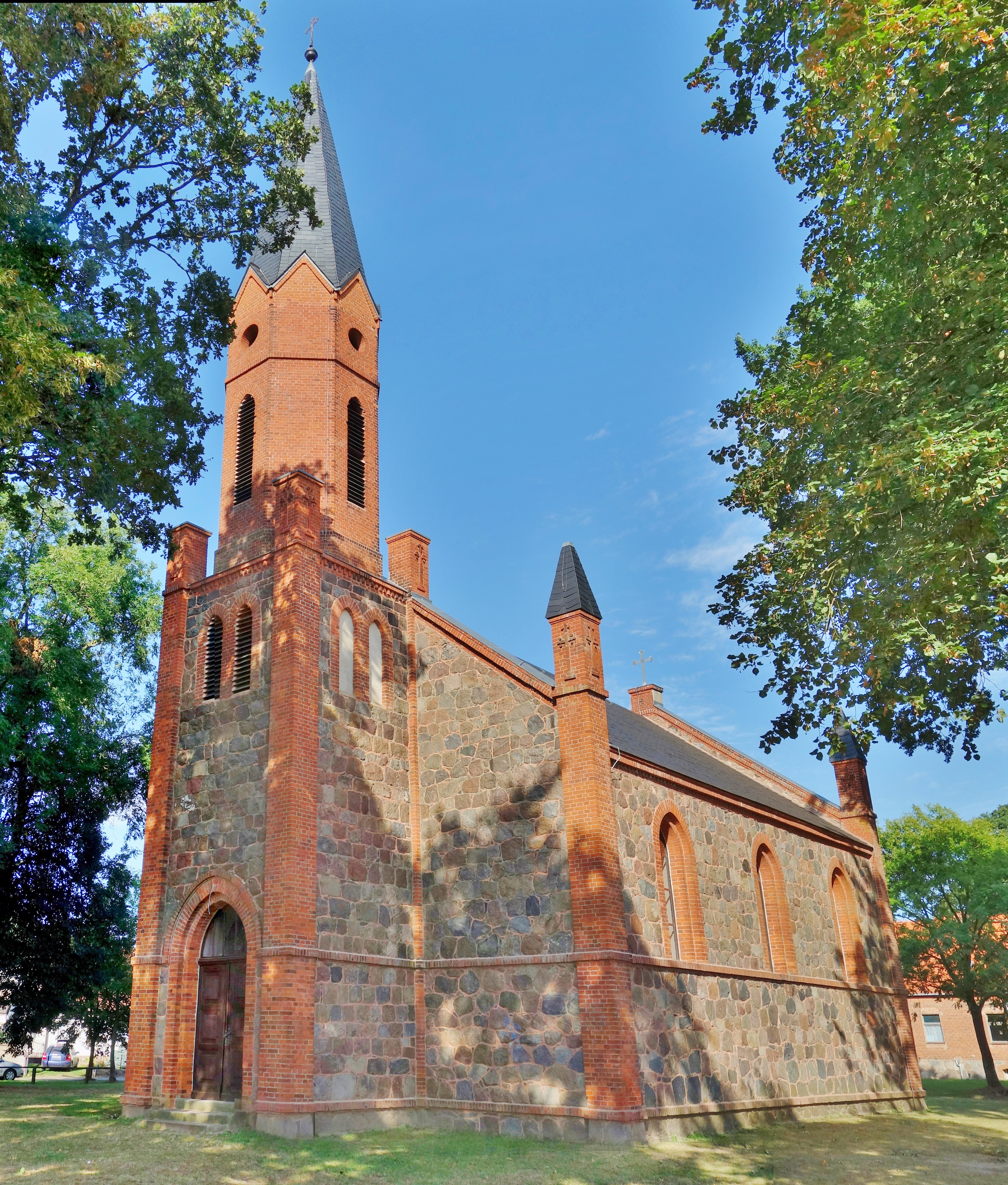
His first project, the village church in Brügge

Ernst Ludwig Reinhold Persius (27 August 1835, Potsdam - 12 December 1912, Berlin) was a German architect and Prussian building official.

== Life and work ==
He was the fourth of six children born to the Royal Architect, Ludwig Persius, and his wife Charlotte, née Sello. From 1854 to 1856, he studied at the Bauakademie with Ferdinand von Arnim, graduating as a construction site manager. During that same period, he took classes at the Prussian Academy of Arts with Heinrich Strack and Karl Bötticher. From 1856 to 1860, he worked as a manager for Friedrich August Stüler.

In 1859, he won first prize at the Academy's architecture competition, which enabled him to study in Southern France and Italy. In 1860, he returned to the Bauakademie, where he studied for four years, obtaining the title of Master Builder. He then took part in the reconstruction of Hohenzollern Castle, until 1867. In the winter months, he travelled to Austria, Italy, England and France.

In 1867, he was appointed a Court Architect and received a teaching position at the Bauakademie, which he kept until 1876, when he succeeded Ludwig Ferdinand Hesse as head of the Palace Construction Commission; a position he held until 1888. He was named a Conservator of Monuments in 1886; the same year he became a Privy Councilor with the title "Court Architect to His Majesty the Emperor". He also served on the commission overseeing the construction of the new Reichstag building. After 1890, he was a Senior Government Councilor. He resigned all of his positions in 1901, for health reasons.

Much of his work involved renovations and reconstructions. During the 1870s, he designed several villas, including the Villa Fischbach and the Villa Mühlberg, on Puschkinallee; both of which are now historical monuments.

== Sources ==
- Oskar Hossfeld: "Reinhold Persius" (obituary) In: Zentralblatt der Bauverwaltung, Vol.33, #5, 1913 (Online)
- Ulrike Bröcker: Die Potsdamer Vorstädte 1861–1900. Von der Turmvilla zum Mietwohnhaus, 2nd ed., Werdersche Verlagsgesellschaft, Worms 2005, pg.292 ISBN 3-88462-208-0
