= Friedrich Ludwig Persius =

Prussian architect (1803–1845)

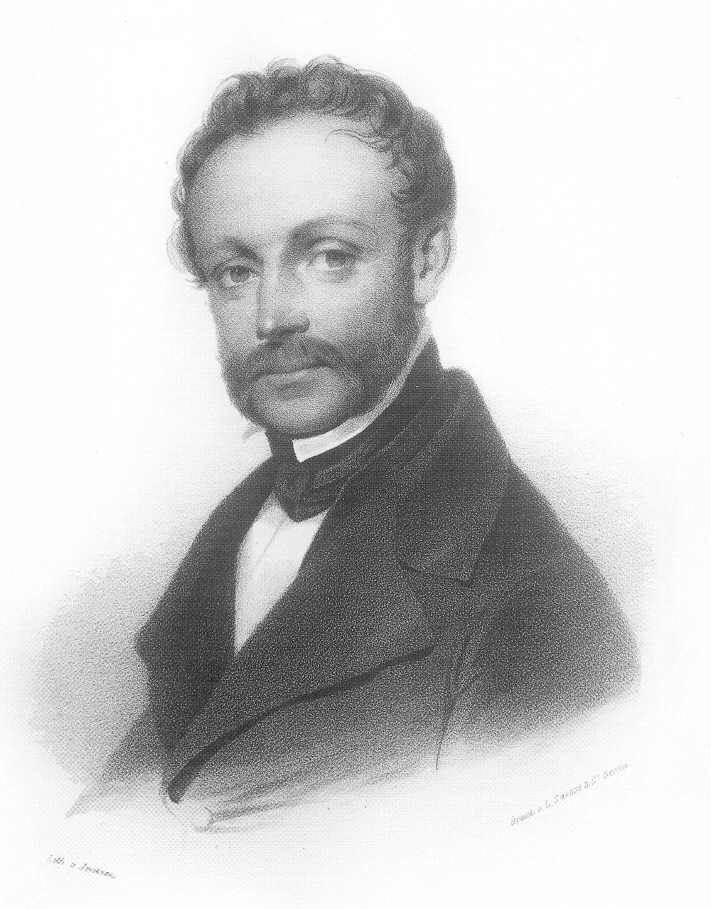
- Ludwig Persius, in 1840, drawn by Friedrich Jentzen.
- Born: 15 February 1803; Potsdam, Margraviate of Brandenburg, Kingdom of Prussia
- Died: 12 July 1845 (aged 42); Potsdam, Province of Brandenburg, Kingdom of Prussia
- Occupation: Architect
- Practice: Associated architectural firm[s]

Friedrich Ludwig Persius (15 February 1803 in Potsdam – 12 July 1845 in Potsdam) was a Prussian architect and a student of Karl Friedrich Schinkel.

Persius assisted Schinkel with, among others, the building of the Charlottenhof Palace and the Roman Baths in Sanssouci Park in Potsdam. He was also involved with the construction of the Sanssouci Palace Great Fountain, the Church of Peace, the Orangery Palace and Norman Tower observation tower on the Ruinenberg opposite Sanssouci Palace.

== Life ==
Persius was born in Potsdam, where he went to public school and grammar school. From 1817 to 1819 he worked with the building inspector Gotthil Hecker; he enrolled as a carpenter. From 1819 he studied to become a surveyor at the Academy of Architecture in Berlin, and took his exam in March 1821. Already working for Schinkel as a student, he executed Schinkel's buildings for the Prussian princes in Glienicke and Babelsberg, and, most notably, for the Crown Prince from 1826 onward, Charlottenhof Palace, the Gardener's Villa, and the Roman Baths, and finally, from 1830 to 1837, St. Nicholas' Church in Potsdam.

From 1821 he worked as a building planner in Potsdam, working under, among others, Karl Friedrich Schinkel during the building of the castle and church on the grounds of Graf Potocki at Kraków. In 1824 Persius became a member of the Association of Architects. In Glienicke he worked as a successful architect under Schinkel. In 1826 he passed his exam to become a master builder at the Academy of Architecture in Berlin, and became a building planner in Charlottenhof Palace.

In 1827 he married Pauline Sello (1808–1883), daughter of Potsdam court gardener Samuel Ludwig Sello (1775–1837), her brother was court gardener Hermann Sello (1800–76). They he had six children: Elisabeth (1829–80), Ludwig (1832–1902), Marie (1834–47), Reinhold (1835–1912), Conrad (1836–1903) and Felix (1842–1885).

In 1829 Persius became a building inspector with the Royal Government in Potsdam. In 1833 he completed his first independent work, renovating the artificial mills (near the Roman Baths) into a residential house for Handmann, the gardener. In 1834 he became the Royal Court Building Inspector.

In 1840 he made a journey on the Rhine, that brought him to, among others, Heidelberg and Bacharach, as well as the Stolzenfels Castle and Ehrenbreitstein Fortress. In 1841 he travelled to Paris, and went on to visit Munich, Strasbourg, Andernach, Remagen-Rolandseck, Bad Godesberg and Cologne. In 1842 he went on a further journey: to Lehnin, Chorin, Halle and thence to Erfurt.

In 1841 Frederick William IV named Persius as his court architect. In 1842 he became a Royal Architectural Advisor and member of the Chief Architectural Authority. In 1843/44 Persius worked for Prince Hermann von Pückler-Muskau among others. In 1843 he made a further journey on the Rhine, which included Bingen, Bad Godesberg and Trier. In 1844 he travelled to Bad Muskau and the Netherlands. In 1845 he undertook a journey to Italy via Nîmes, Marseille and Genoa to Rome, Naples, Vicenza, Padua, Venice and Verona.

In 1845 Persius was appointed as Head Architectural Advisor with retrospective effect from 12 October 1842. His brief but significant career was concentrated in Potsdam, interrupted by only a few trips in Germany (including Bad Muskau in 1844, where he created the Orangerie – which until then had not been considered his work), to Paris (1841), Holland (1844), Italy (January to May 1845).

On 12 July 1845 he died of typhus, at the age of only 42, and was laid to rest in the Bornstedt Cemetery in Sello-Teil (near the Krongut Bornstedt) in Potsdam.

== Works ==
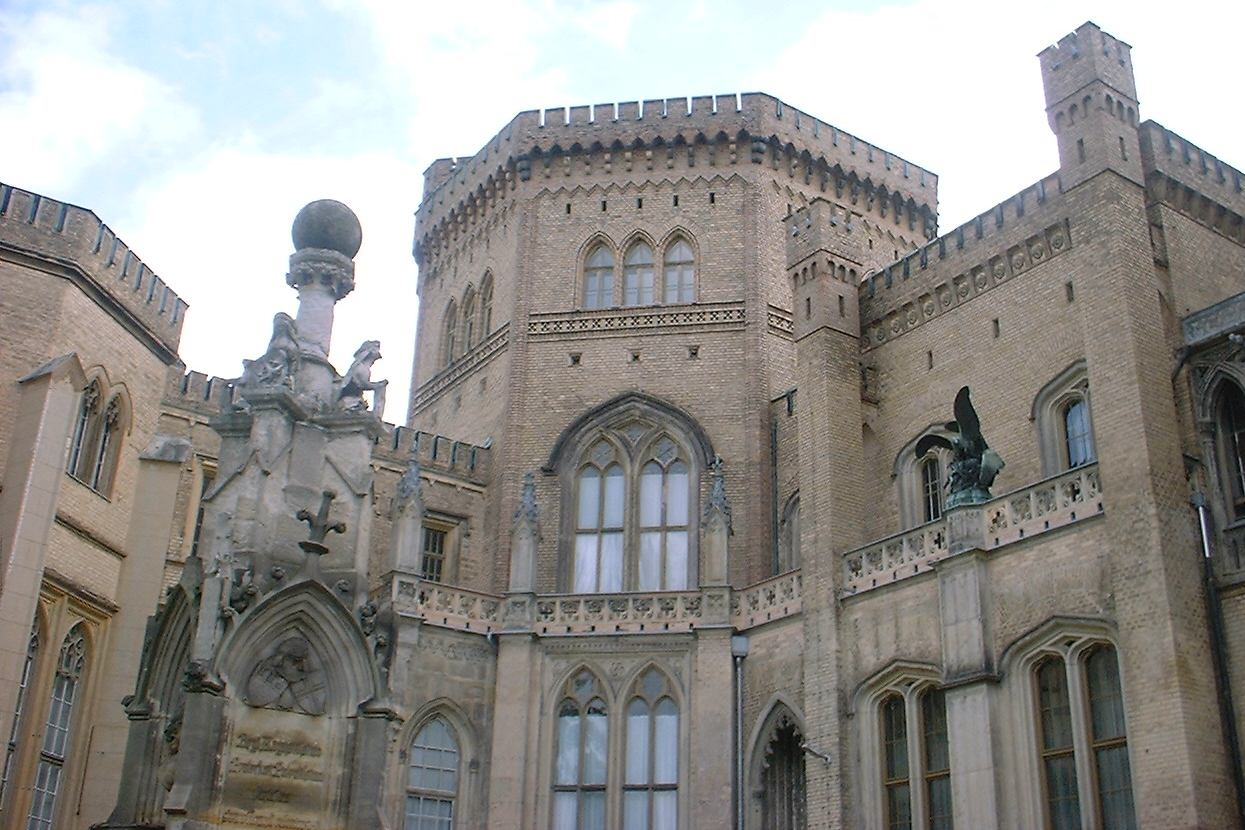
Babelsberg Castle in Potsdam-Babelsberg

=== Built in co-operation with Schinkel ===
- 1821, castle and church on the grounds of Count Artur Potocki at Kraków

=== Remaining ===
- 1833, house in Sanssouci Park near the Roman Baths
- 1834/35, Traveller's and Fisherman's House in Uetz (in Uetz-Paaren, near Potsdam)
- 1837/38, Schierstedt Farmhouse in Gräben-Dahlen
- 1838/39, gardener and machine house, the Devil's Bridge, Orangery and greenhouse in Glienicke Park (in Berlin-Wannsee)
- 1840, Stibadium in Park Glienicke (in Berlin-Wannsee)
- 1840/41, Entenfang Establishment at the Safari Park (in Geltow, Schwielowsee) as well as the rebuilding of the side wings of the Sanssouci Palace
- 1840–42, Rebuilding of Glienicke Palace (in Berlin-Wannsee)
- 1841, Prince's Underforester's House at Moorlake (in Berlin-Wannsee); first blueprints for the Church of Peace (completed in 1844)
- 1841/42, Stag Gate in Glienicke Park; first, second and third Forester's Establishment and the Gamekeeper's House in the Safari Park; Blueprints for the dome of the Church of St. Nikolai (completed in 1850)
- 1841–43, Conversion of the Royal Civil Cabinet House (in Potsdam, Allee nach Sanssouci 6); Head gardener's House in Sello (now the Villa Kache in Potsdam, Maulbeerallee 2); Steam engine house for Sanssouci (in Potsdam, Breite Str. 28); steam flour mills of the former Preußische Seehandlung (in Potsdam, Zeppelinstr. 136)
- 1841–44, Church of the Redeemer and Roman Bank in Potsdam-Sacrow (Krampnitzer Str. 9); Fountains and minor architectural details in Sanssouci Park; Atrium and Pergola in the Paradise Garden (completed in 1848); Mulberry Alley, now part of the Botanical Gardens at the University of Potsdam

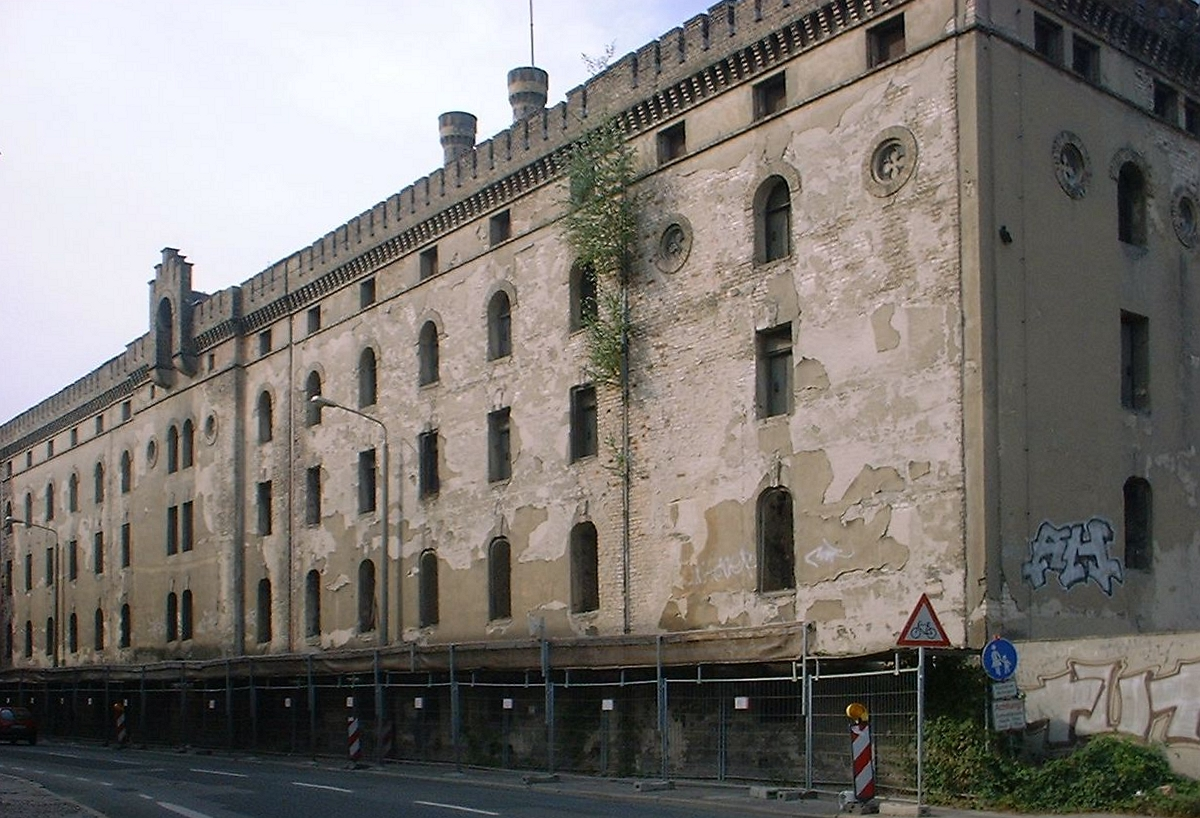
Körnermagazin in Potsdam

- 1842, north wing of the Picture Gallery and conversion of the New Chambers (near Sanssouci Palace); Blueprints of the Exedra on Ruinenberg (completed 1843/44)
- 1842–44, Charlottenhof Pheasantry (in Potsdam, Geschwister-Scholl-Str. 36)
- 1842/43, Blueprints for the Körner Repository on the site of the Department of Provisions (in Potsdam, Leipziger Str. 7/8); Hunter's Gate in Glienicke Park (in Berlin-Wannsee)
- 1843, Seaman's House in Schweizerstil in Glienicke Park (in Berlin-Wannsee); Blueprints for the Villa Tieck (completed 1845/46; in Potsdam, Schopenhauerstr. 24); Blueprints for Ahok House (completed 1845; in Potsdam, Weinbergstr. 9); Plans for the conversion of the Villa Illaire (formerly the house of the head gardener Voss; completed 1846)
- 1843/44, Brandt House (in Potsdam, Zeppelinstr. 189); Orangery in Fürst-Pückler Park in Bad Muskau; Viaduct in Potsdam-Bornstedt ("Devil's Grave Bridge" over the Bornstedt Durchstich); Preacher House in Lehnin; Conversion and extension of the dairy farm in the New Garden
- 1843–45, Extension of Babelsberg Castle; Engine house and gatekeeper's house in Potsdam-Babelsberg; Villa Tiedke (in Potsdam, Reiterweg 1); Villa Schöningen (in Potsdam, Berliner Str. 86)
- 1844, Blueprints for Lindstedt Castle (completed elsewhere in Potsdam); Blueprints for the Norman Tower on the Ruinenberg (completed 1845 under chief architectural advisor Ferdinand von Arnim); Blueprints for the Nedlitzer Farmhouse (in Potsdam-Neu Fahrland, Tschudistr. 1); Bornim Economy Grange (only the tower remains; in Potsdam, Max-Eyth-Allee); House of Master Carpenter Rietz (in Potsdam-Bornstedt, Ribbeckstr. 22); Blueprints for the church in Saarmund (completed 1846-48)
- 1844/45, conversion of Minerva Box (in Potsdam, Kiezstr. 10)
- 1845, Farmyard in Glienicke Park (in Berlin-Wannsee); Blueprints for the church in Heringsdorf (1846-48 ausgeführt)

=== No longer remaining ===
- 1835–39, Villa Jacobs
- 1837, Villa Persius; Barns (Schweizerhaus) at the Historic Mill in Sanssouci Park
- 1842, Gangway over the Potsdam City Canal
- 1842/43, Kneib steam mills; Jacobs sugar silo
- 1844, Plans for the Nedlitz Northern Bridge (completed 1853/54, demolished 2001 despite preservation status); "To Doktor Faust" pub in Potsdam-Sacrow
