= Etos TV =

Etos TV was a planned television channel owned by former RTL Deutschland executive Wolf Tillman Schneider in association with German funeraries, which attempted to break the obituary monopoly usually reserved for the press. In addition to obituaries, the channel would also air related programming, such as documentaries on cemeteries, as well as programming. The channel was scheduled to launch in late 2007, later delayed to 2008, then 2009, and ultimately never launched as a result of a lack of funds.

== Concept ==
The concept was created on 26 March 2007 by Wolf Tillman Schneider, in Glienicke. That day, he made an experiment featuring a televised obituary. His idea was to end the obituary monopoly which is reserved for newspapers. Initially, the channel was supposed to be named Eos TV, but had to be renamed Etos TV in September 2007 in order to avoid confusion with Jan Mojto's Eos Entertainment, as well as to avoid a court dispute.

On 19 September 2007, the Commission for Concentration of the Media (KEK) approved Etos TV's license. Speaking to Financial Times Deutschland, Schneider had a plan to withdraw the channel from a negative image of being "Death TV" by including programing that covered topics such as trauma and guidance, which even public broadcasters (ARD and ZDF) barely covered.

The channel was originally set to launch in early 2008, but it missed the target and opted instead for a new early 2009 target.

== Programming ==
The channel planned to produce an obituary video for the deceased, granted that the family paid a sum of €2,000. The initial goal was to air at least one hour a day, later expanding to four hours, and would target 5.6 million viewers over the age of 50, broadcasting free-to-air using the Astra satellite. The video would be produced by an outside partner. 85% of the programming, per its October 2008 plan, was to consist of services-based programming for the elderly, such as nutrition and physical exercise, healthcare, searching for heirs and senior living concepts.

== Suspension ==
The project was suspended in 2009 after the group could not find investors. In 2011, Volker Rumler announced his intent to relaunch the channel, issuing a request to the Hesse State Regulator for Private Broadcasting and New Media.
