= Ethos (film) =

2011 documentary film

- Film poster
- Directed by: Pete McGrain
- Written by: Pete McGrain
- Narrated by: Woody Harrelson
- Release date: February 5, 2011

Ethos: A Time for a Change is a 2011 documentary film directed and written by Pete McGrain and hosted by Woody Harrelson. The main point of the film is to encourage people to engage in ethical consumerism.

The film uses many video interview segments from other films at length, including the Zeitgeist movies and, predominantly, The Corporation.

== Reception ==
A review describes the film as follows: "This film is a Chamber of Possible Horrors. A staccato listing of many possible conspiracies of varying degrees of credibility challenges us with the statement that there are real conspiracies. The suggestions have got to come fast because it is all packed into a short 69-minute film, and there are a lot of conspiracies and scary situations to get through. And no doubt some of what McGrain is suggesting is indeed true, and no doubt some of it is absolute balderdash. McGrain gives little evidence beyond quotes and questionable testimony. Before the viewer has time to think about one claim, McGrain has presented two more. What he presents lies somewhere in the twilight zone between the Washington Post and the Weekly World News."
