= Charlottenhof Palace =

Former royal palace in Germany

- Schloss Charlottenhof
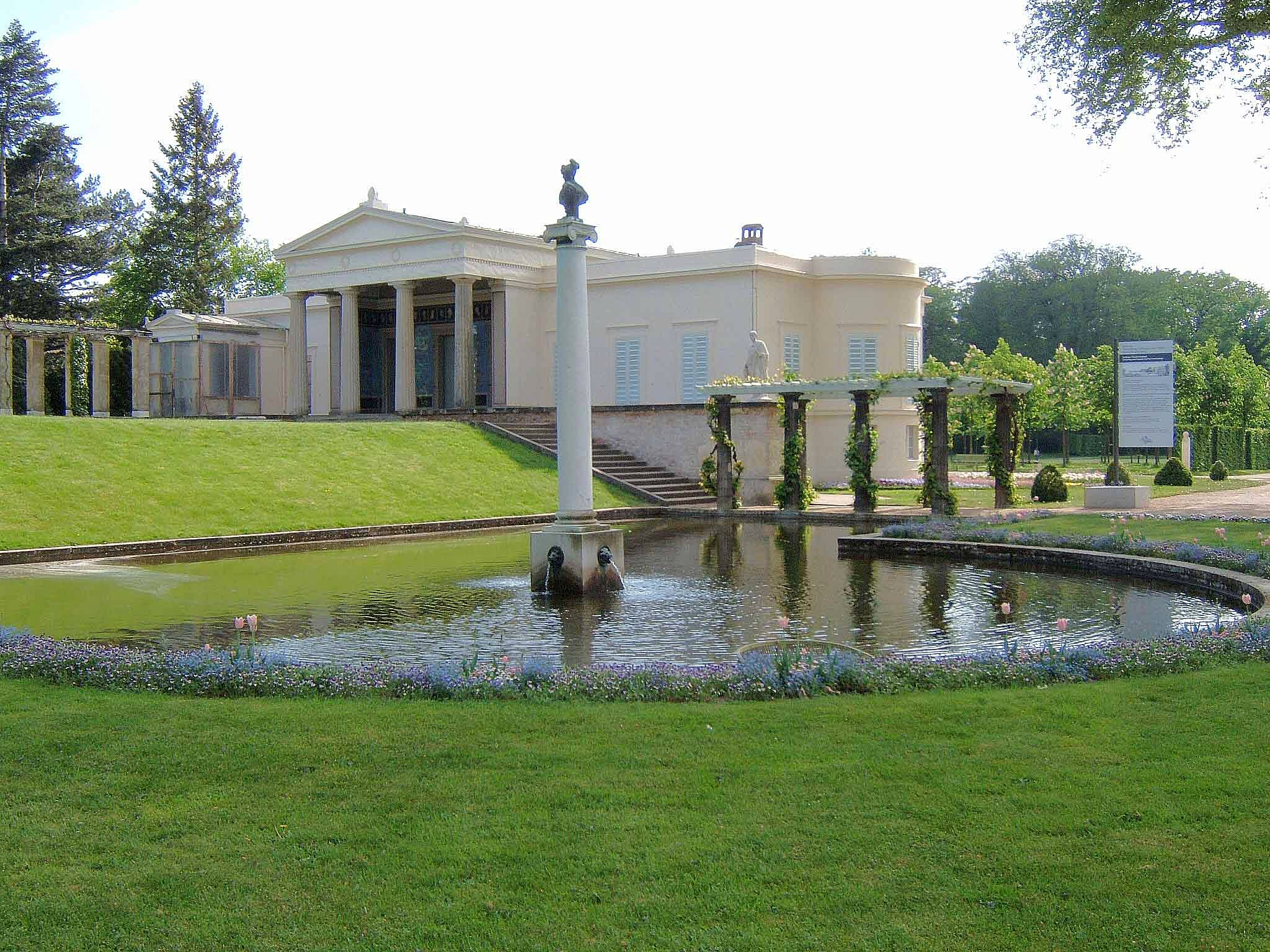
- Charlottenhof Palace

- Location within Germany Location within Brandenburg
- Interactive map of the Charlottenhof Palace area

General information
- Type: Palace
- Architectural style: Neoclassical
- Location: Potsdam, Germany
- Coordinates: 52°23′44″N 13°01′32″E
- Construction started: 1826
- Completed: 1829
- Client: Frederick William IV of Prussia
- Owner: Stiftung Preußische Schlösser und Gärten Berlin-Brandenburg

Design and construction
- Architects: Karl Friedrich Schinkel; Ludwig Persius

Website
- www.spsg.de/en/palaces-gardens/object/charlottenhof-villa/

UNESCO World Heritage Site
- Part of: Palaces and Parks of Potsdam and Berlin
- Criteria: Cultural: (i)(ii)(iv)
- Reference: 532ter
- Inscription: 1990 (14th Session)
- Extensions: 1992, 1999

Charlottenhof Palace or Charlottenhof Manor (German: Schloss Charlottenhof) is a former royal palace located southwest of Sanssouci Palace in Sanssouci Park at Potsdam, Germany. It is best known as the summer residence of Crown Prince Frederick William (later King Frederick William IV of Prussia). Today, it is maintained by the Prussian Palaces and Gardens Foundation Berlin-Brandenburg.

== Location ==
Charlottenhof Palace and its surrounding park are located in the Brandenburger Vorstadt district of Potsdam's Westliche Vorstädte borough. Being located adjacent to Sanssouci Park, it is part of the Berlin-Potsdam Palaces and Parks system.

=== Transport ===
The palace is located between the Potsdam-Park Sanssouci and Potsdam-Charlottenhof railway stations, both offering direct DB Regio regional rail connections to Potsdam Central Station and Berlin Central Station.

Several Potsdam Tram lines connect the palace to central Potsdam at Schloss Charlottenhof and Bahnhof Charlottenhof/Geschwister-Scholl-Straße stations.

== Overview ==
The park area, with its various buildings, dates back to the 18th century. After it had changed hands several times, King Frederick William III of Prussia bought the land that borders the south of Sanssouci Park. He gave it to his son Frederick William and his wife Elisabeth Ludovika for Christmas in 1825.

The Crown Prince charged the architect Karl Friedrich Schinkel with remodeling an existing farmhouse, and the project was completed at low cost from 1826 through 1829. In the end, Schinkel, with the help of his student Ludwig Persius, built a small Neoclassical palace on the foundations of the old farmhouse in the image of a Roman villa.

With designs he created himself, the artistically inclined Crown Prince participated in the planning of the palace and its surrounding park. He referred to this summer residence as "Siam", which at the time was considered "the Land of the Free", and to himself jokingly as the "Siam House architect".

Officially, the palace and park were named "Charlottenhof" in honor of Maria Charlotte von Gentzkow, who had owned the property from 1790 to 1794.

The interior design of the ten rooms is still largely intact. The furniture, for the most part designed by Schinkel himself, is remarkable for its simple and cultivated style.

The palace's most distinctive room is the tent room fashioned after a Roman Caesar's tent. In the tent room, both the ceiling and walls are decorated with blue-and-white striped wallpaper, and the window treatments, bed tent, and coverings continue that design. The room was used as a bedroom for companions and guests.

The blue and white theme is continued throughout on the palace's window shutters, it seems, in deference to the Bavarian heritage of the then crown princess Elisabeth.

Between 1835 and 1840, the explorer and world traveler Alexander von Humboldt was invited and stayed in the tent room during the summer months.

== Charlottenhof Park ==
The landscape architect Peter Joseph Lenné was charged with the design of the Charlottenhof gardens.

He completely recreated the initially flat and partly marshy area into an English garden with trees, lawn and water features. He also linked the new park at Charlottenhof to the older one at Sanssouci from the time of Frederick the Great.

== World Heritage Site ==
Since 1990, Charlottenhof Palace has been part of the UNESCO World Heritage Site "Palaces and Parks of Potsdam and Berlin". The palace is administered by the Stiftung Preußische Schlösser und Gärten Berlin-Brandenburg.

== See also ==
- List of sights of Potsdam
- List of castles in Berlin and Brandenburg
- Palaces and Parks of Potsdam and Berlin
