= Urban planning in the United States =

Urban planning in the United States is practice of urban planning as it relates specifically to localities and urban centers in the United States.

== History ==
=== Early history ===
In 1682, William Penn founded Philadelphia, Pennsylvania, planning it as a city to serve as a port on the Delaware River and as a place for government. Hoping that Philadelphia would become more like an English rural town instead of a city, Penn laid out roads on a grid plan to keep houses and businesses spread far apart, with areas for gardens and orchards. The city's inhabitants did not follow Penn's plans, as they crowded by the Delaware River, the port, and subdivided and resold their lots. Before Penn left Philadelphia for the last time, he issued the Charter of 1701 establishing it as a city. It became an important trading center, poor at first, but with tolerable living conditions by the 1750s. Benjamin Franklin, a leading citizen, helped improve city services and founded new ones, such as fire protection, a library, and one of the American colonies' first hospitals.

President George Washington appointed Pierre L'Enfant in 1791 to design the new capital city (later named the City of Washington) under the supervision of three Commissioners, whom Washington had appointed to oversee the planning and development of the federal territory that would later become the District of Columbia. Thomas Jefferson, who worked alongside President Washington in overseeing the plans for the capital, sent L'Enfant a letter outlining his task, which was to provide a drawing of suitable sites for the federal city and the public buildings. Though Jefferson had modest ideas for the Capital, L'Enfant saw the task as far more grandiose, believing he was not only locating the capital, but also devising the city plan and designing the buildings. Dismissed by the Washington D.C. commission, L'Enfant's plan would not be revived and implemented until 1902, as part of the McMillan Commission's efforts to rebuild the city.

In 1811, land for New York's Central Park was acquired by the city through eminent domain and incorporated into the urban plan. Residents of Seneca Village, a settlement of free African Americans and German and Irish immigrants located on the future site of Central Park, were evicted by 1857. Frederick Law Olmsted, with the help of Calvert Vaux, developed a design for Central Park, which was entered into the open competition held by the city, and subsequently won. Their plan was then successfully implemented by the city, and was opened to the public in the winter of 1858.

=== The twentieth century ===
In 1909, the first National Conference on City Planning was held in Washington D.C. Dominating the conference, Benjamin C. Marshall urged the government to conduct a 'civic census' to study the state of American cities, educate the public on its findings, and establish a national city-planning committee.

Daniel Burnham was commissioned by the Chicago Merchants Association to lead a team to plan Chicago's World's Columbian Exposition of 1893.

In 1933, the National Planning Board was established.

In 1965, President Lyndon B. Johnson established the Department of Housing and Urban Development.

== See also ==
=== Overviews and related topics ===
- Urban planning

=== Specific cities, towns, and urban centers ===
- History of Philadelphia
- Augusta, Georgia
- New Haven, Connecticut
- Holyoke, Massachusetts
- Annapolis, Maryland
- Charleston, South Carolina
- Columbia, South Carolina
- New Orleans
- Mobile, Alabama
- Pierre L'Enfant
