= State-centered theory =

Political theory

State-centered theory (or state-centred federalism) is a political theory which stresses the role of the government on civil society. It holds that the state itself can structure political life to some degree, but doesn't facilitate the way power is distributed between classes and other groups at a given time.

Theory holding that the national government represents a voluntary compact or agreement between the states, which retain a dominant position. Supporters of state-centered federalism included Thomas Jefferson and the Republican Party. They saw the Constitution as an agreement among the states of which gave them the ability to self-governance.

National policy makers interact with economy independently, with intention of raising social welfare. This gives legitimacy to market intervention.
