= Behavioral urbanism =

Behavioral urbanism and its related area of study, behavioral architecture, is an interdisciplinary field focused on the interaction between humans and the built environment, studying the effects of social, cognitive, and emotional factors in understanding the spatial behavior of individuals.
