= Urban planning =

Technical process of land use and urban design

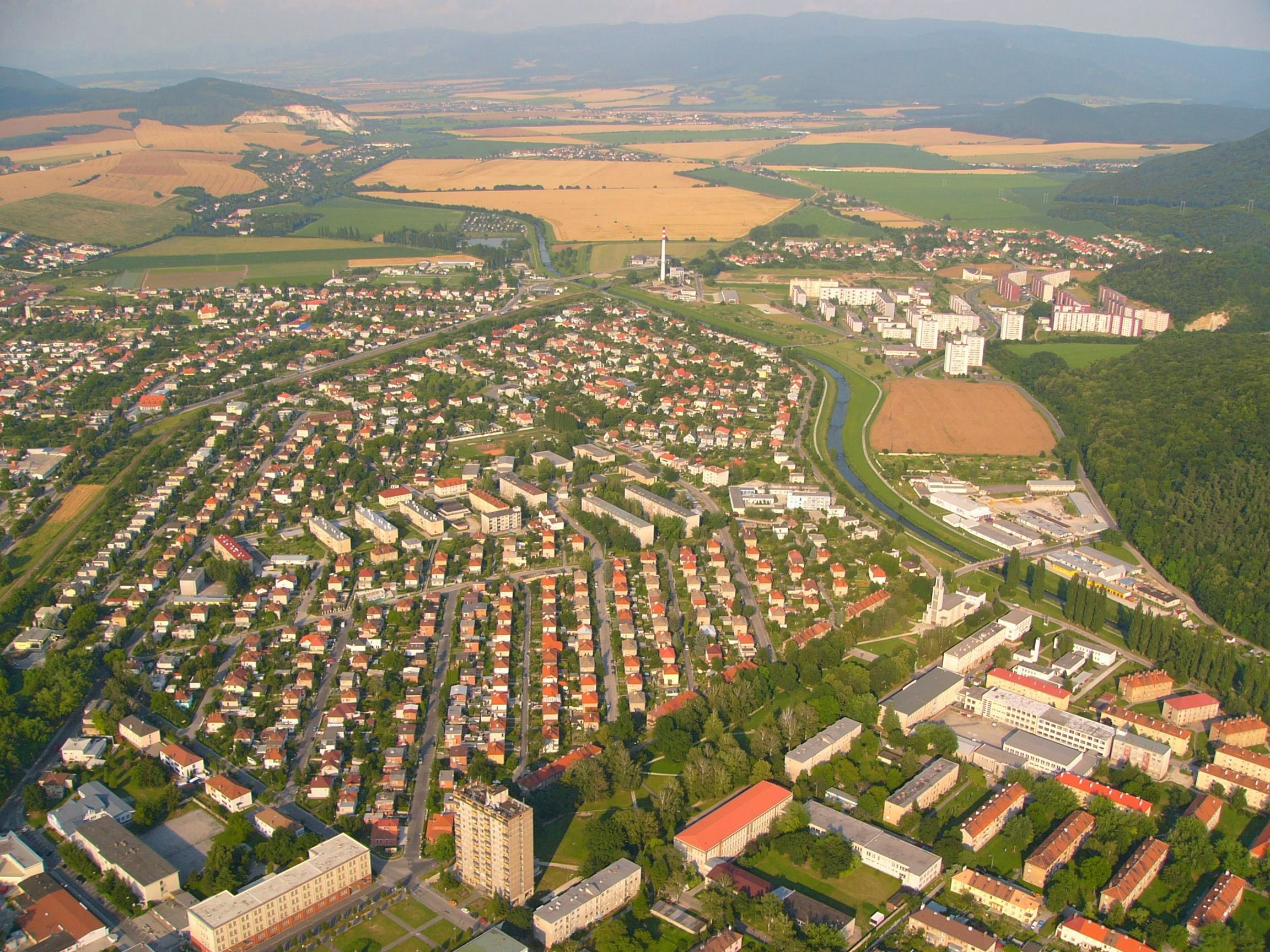
Partizánske in Slovakia – an example of a typical planned European industrial town founded in 1938 together with a shoemaking factory in which practically all adult inhabitants of the city were employed

Urban planning (also called city planning or town planning in some contexts) is the process of developing and designing plans for land use and the built environment, including air, water, and the infrastructure passing into and out of urban areas, such as transportation, communications, and power distribution networks, and their accessibility. Traditionally, urban planning followed a top-down approach in master planning the physical layout of human settlements. The primary concern was the public welfare, which included considerations of efficiency, sanitation, protection and use of the environment, as well as taking account of effects of the master plans on the social and economic activities. Over time, urban planning has adopted a focus on the social and environmental "bottom lines" that focus on using planning as a tool to improve the health and well-being of people and maintain sustainability standards. In the mid-20th century, urban planning experts such as Jane Jacobs called on urban planners to take resident experiences and needs more into consideration.

Urban planning answers questions about how people will live, work, and play in a given area and thus, guides orderly development in urban, suburban and rural areas. Although predominantly concerned with the planning of settlements and communities, urban planners are also responsible for planning the efficient transportation of goods, resources, people, and waste. The distribution of basic necessities such as water and electricity; a sense of inclusion and opportunity for people of all kinds, culture and needs; economic growth or business development; improving health and conserving areas of natural environmental significance that actively contribute to reducing CO_{2} emissions as well as protecting heritage structures and built environments. Since most urban planning teams consist of highly educated individuals who work for city governments, recent debates focus on how to involve more community members in city planning processes.

Urban planning is an interdisciplinary field that includes civil engineering, architecture, human geography, social science and design sciences. Practitioners of urban planning use research and analysis, strategic thinking, engineering architecture, urban design, public consultation, policy recommendations, implementation and management. It is closely related to the field of urban design and some urban planners provide designs for streets, parks, buildings and other urban areas. Urban planners work with the cognate fields of civil engineering, landscape architecture, architecture, and public administration to achieve strategic, policy and sustainability goals. Early urban planners were often members of these cognate fields though in the 21st century, urban planning is a separate, independent professional discipline. The discipline of urban planning is the broader category that includes different sub-fields such as land-use planning, zoning, economic development, environmental planning, and transportation planning. Creating the plans requires a thorough understanding of penal codes and zonal codes of planning.

Another important aspect of urban planning is that projects range from the large-scale planning of new towns and Greenfield projects to the transformation and renewal of existing cities, neighborhoods, and public spaces. Pierre Charles L'Enfant and Lúcio Costa are known for planning new capital cities, while Daniel Burnham's Plan of Chicago, Georges-Eugene Haussmann's renovation of Paris, and the urban renewal projects of Robert Moses exemplify the large-scale reshaping of existing urban environments. Although many of Le Corbusier's urban plans were never realized, his ideas profoundly influenced twentieth-century urban planning.

== History ==
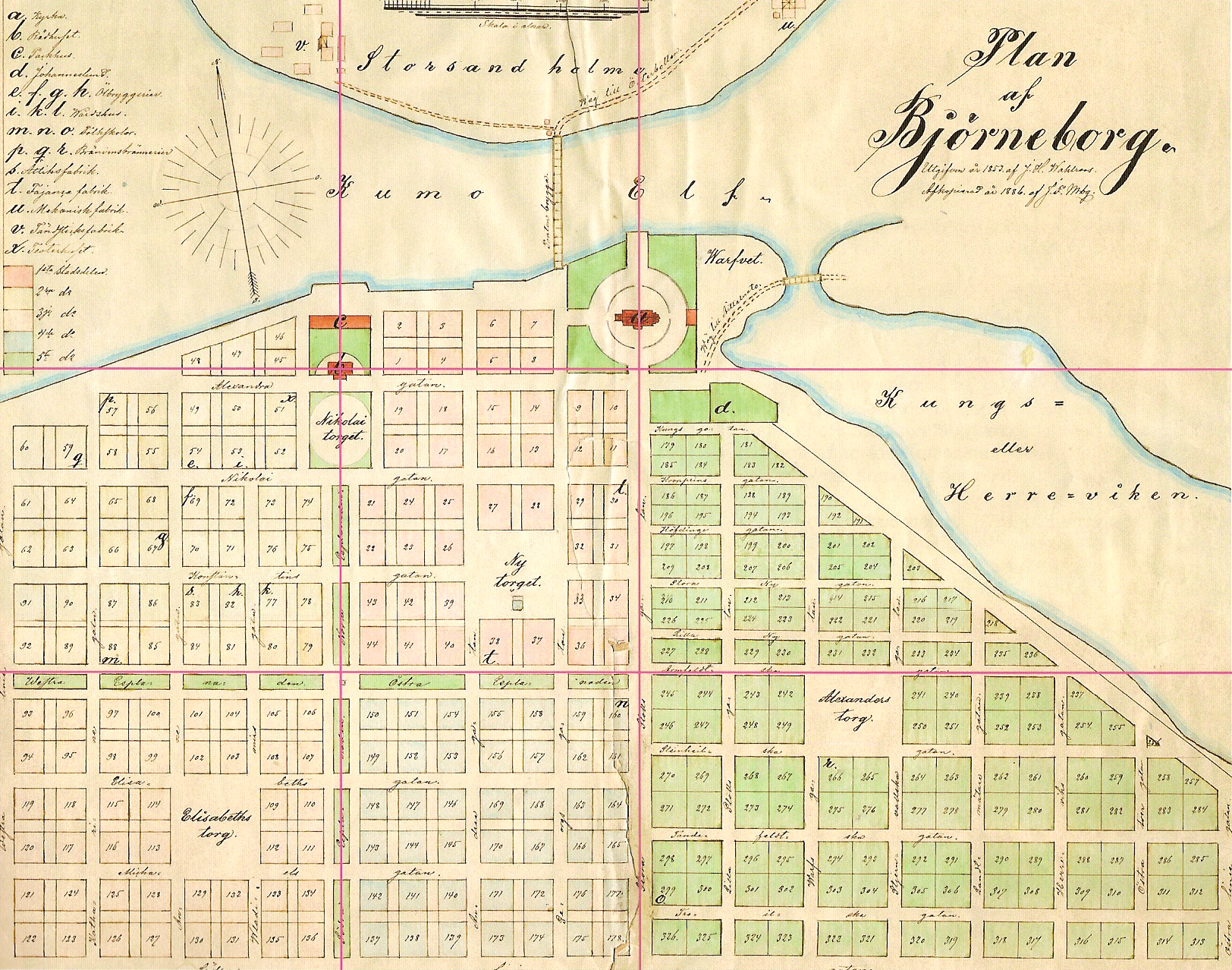
1852 city plan of Pori by G. T. von Chiewitz

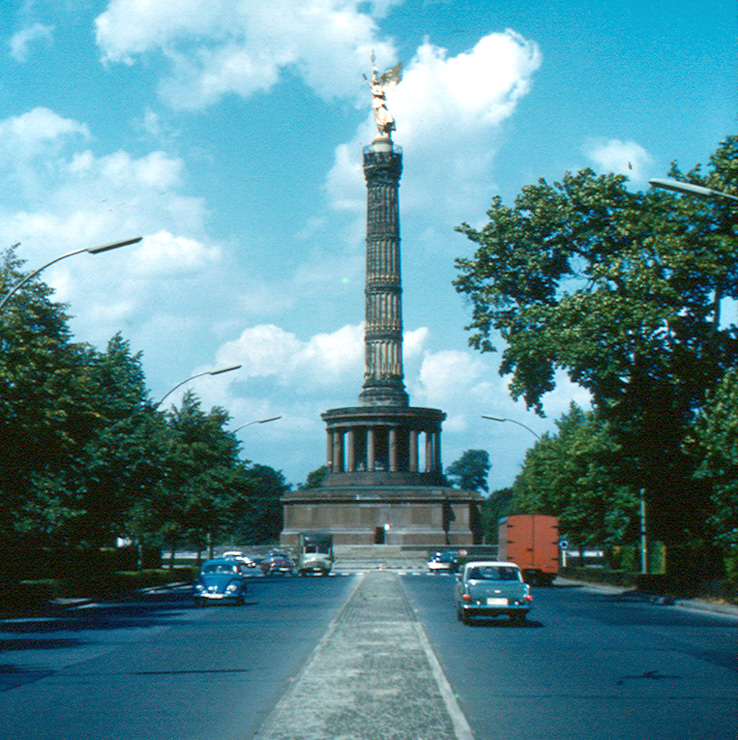
Berlin – Siegessäule. August 1963. Spacious and organized city planning in Germany was official government policy dating back to Nazi rule.

There is evidence of urban planning and designed communities dating back to the Mesopotamian, Indus Valley, Minoan, and Egyptian civilizations in the third millennium BCE. Archaeologists studying the ruins of cities in these areas find paved streets that were laid out at right angles in a grid pattern. The idea of a planned out urban area evolved as different civilizations adopted it. Beginning in the 8th century BCE, Greek city states primarily used orthogonal (or grid-like) plans. Hippodamus of Miletus (498–408 BC), the ancient Greek architect and urban planner, is considered to be "the father of European urban planning", and the namesake of the "Hippodamian plan" (grid plan) of city layout.

The ancient Romans also used orthogonal plans for their cities. City planning in the Roman world was developed for military defense and public convenience. The spread of the Roman Empire subsequently spread the ideas of urban planning. As the Roman Empire declined, these ideas slowly disappeared. However, many cities in Europe still held onto the planned Roman city center. Cities in Europe from the 9th to 14th centuries, often grew organically and sometimes chaotically. But in the following centuries with the coming of the Renaissance many new cities were enlarged with newly planned extensions. From the 15th century on, much more is recorded of urban design and the people that were involved. In this period, theoretical treatises on architecture and urban planning start to appear in which theoretical questions around planning the main lines, ensuring plans meet the needs of the given population and so forth are addressed and designs of towns and cities are described and depicted. During the Enlightenment period, several European rulers ambitiously attempted to redesign capital cities. During the Second French Empire, Baron Georges-Eugène Haussmann, under the direction of Napoleon III, redesigned the city of Paris into a more modern capital, with long, straight, wide boulevards.

Planning and architecture went through a paradigm shift at the turn of the 20th century. The industrialized cities of the 19th century grew at a tremendous rate. The evils of urban life for the working poor were becoming increasingly evident as a matter of public concern. The laissez-faire style of government management of the economy, in fashion for most of the Victorian era, was starting to give way to a New Liberalism that championed intervention on the part of the poor and disadvantaged. Around 1900, theorists began developing urban planning models to mitigate the consequences of the industrial age, by providing citizens, especially factory workers, with healthier environments.

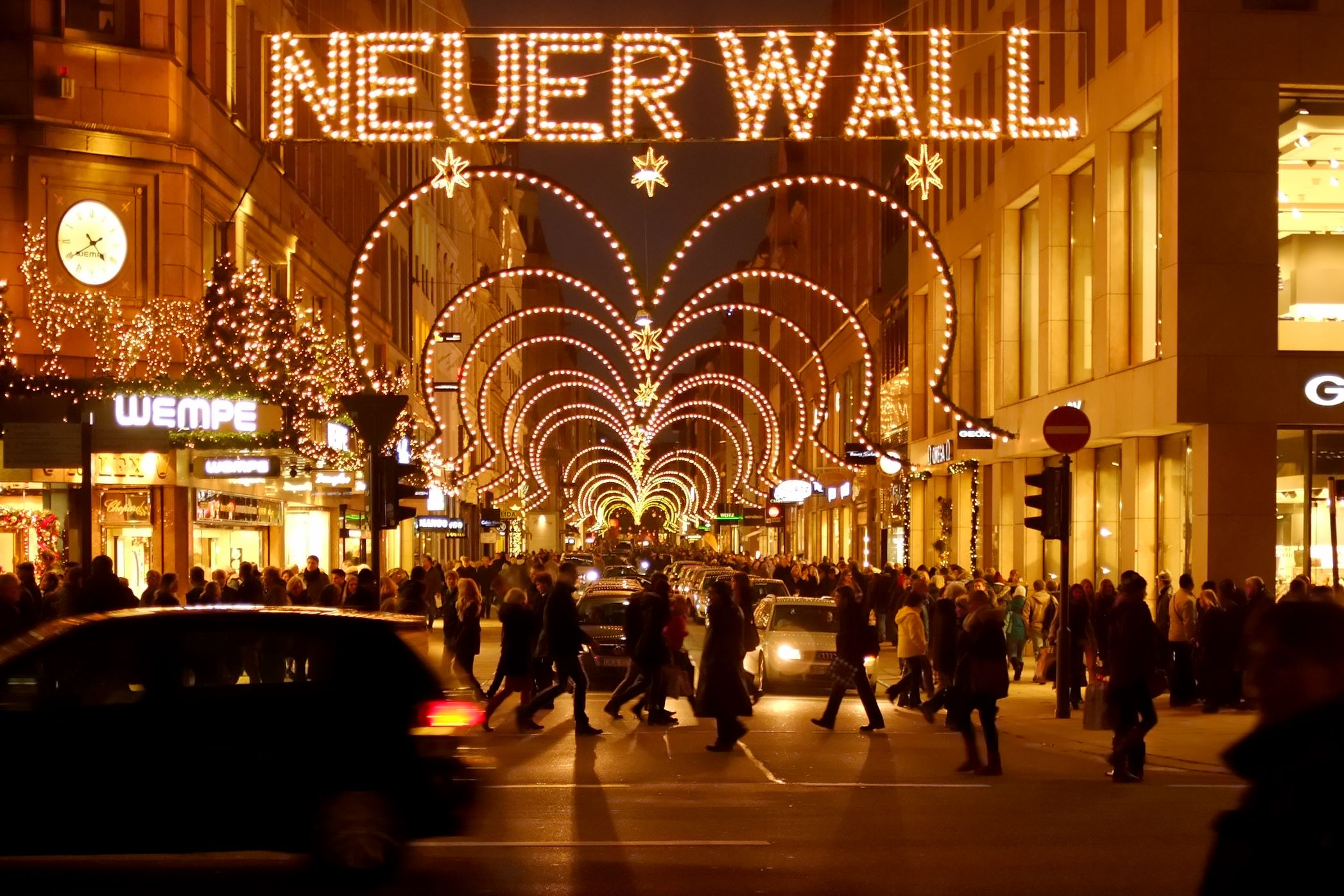
Neuer Wall, one of Europe's most luxurious shopping streets

At the beginning of the 20th century, urban planning began to be recognized as a separate profession. The Town and Country Planning Association was founded in 1899 and the first academic course in Great Britain on urban planning was offered by the University of Liverpool in 1909. In the 1920s, the ideas of modernism and uniformity began to emerge in urban planning, and lasted until the 1970s. The architect Le Corbusier presented the Radiant City in 1933 as a city that grew in the form of towers, which offered a solution to the problem of pollution and over-crowding. But many planners started to believe that the ideas of modernism in urban planning led to higher crime rates and social problems. In 1961, Jane Jacobs published The Death and Life of Great American Cities, establishing the concept of livable streets and encouraging urban renewal planners to adopt a livable urban-area perspective. In the second half of the 20th century, urban planners gradually shifted their focus to individualism and diversity in urban centers.

== 21st-century practices ==
Urban planners studying the effects of increasing congestion in urban areas began to address the externalities, the negative impacts caused by induced demand from larger highway systems in western countries such as in the United States. The United Nations Department of Economic and Social Affairs predicted in 2018 that around 2.5 billion more people occupy urban areas by 2050 according to population elements of global migration. New planning theories have adopted non-traditional concepts such as blue Zones and innovation districts to incorporate geographic areas within the city that allow for novel business development and the prioritization of infrastructure that would assist with improving the quality of life of citizens by extending their potential lifespan.

Planning practices have incorporated policy changes to help address anthropogenic (human caused) climate change. London began to charge a congestion charge for cars trying to access already crowded places in the city.

== Theories ==
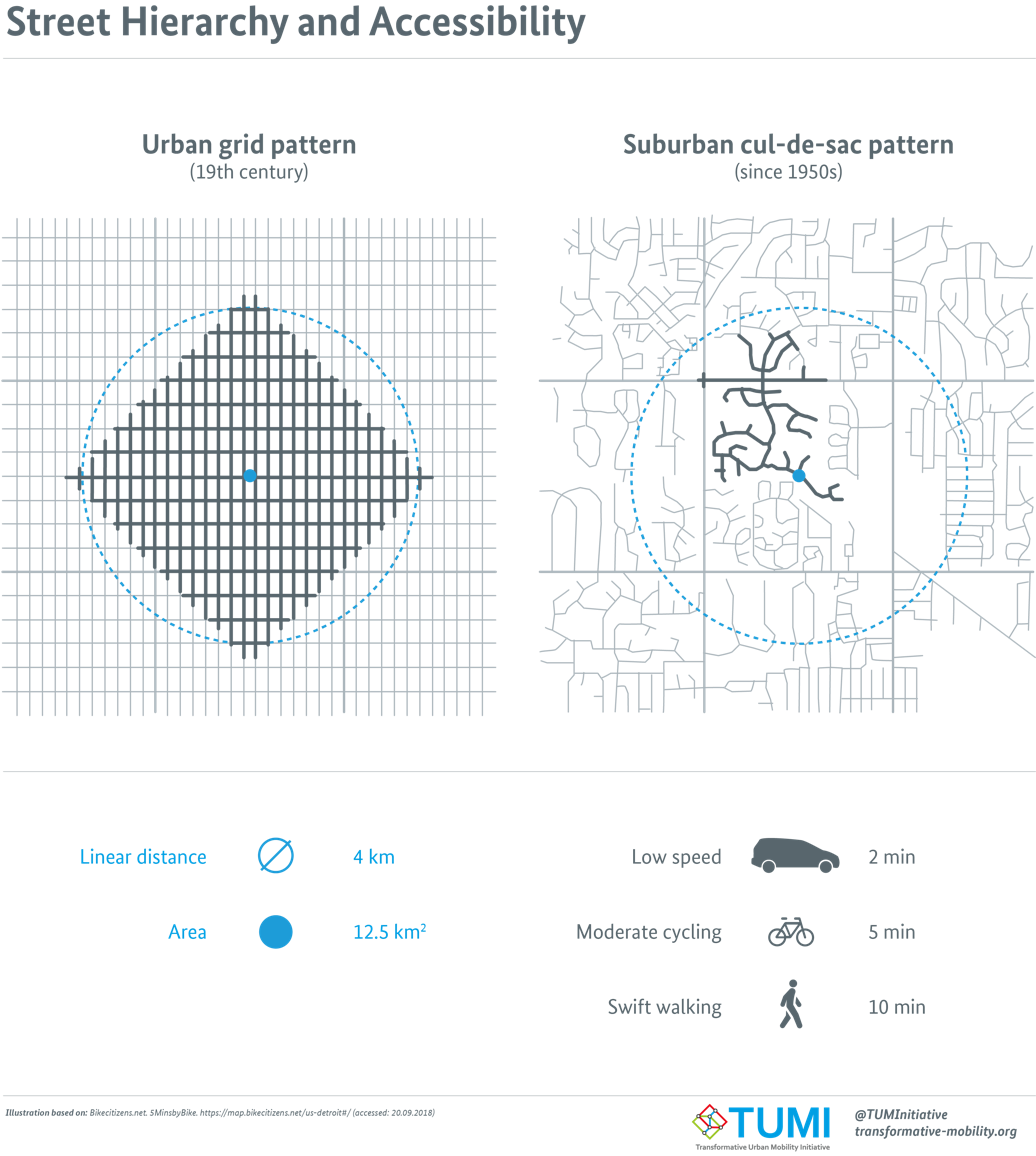
Street Hierarchy and Accessibility

Planning theory is the body of scientific concepts, definitions, behavioral relationships, and assumptions that define the body of knowledge of urban planning. There are eight procedural theories of planning that remain the principal theories of planning procedure today: the rational-comprehensive approach, the incremental approach, the transactive approach, the communicative approach, the advocacy approach, the equity approach, the radical approach, and the humanist or phenomenological approach. Some other conceptual planning theories include Ebenezer Howard's The Three Magnets theory, which he envisioned for the future of British settlements, as well as his Garden Cities, the Concentric Zone Model, also called the Burgess Model, developed by sociologist Ernest Burgess, the Radburn Superblock that encourages pedestrian movement, the Sector Model and the Multiple Nuclei Model among others.

Participatory planning is an urban planning approach that involves the entire community in the planning process. Participatory planning in the United States emerged during the 1960s and 1970s. Urban planning can follow local median-voter preferences.

== Technical aspects ==
Technical aspects of urban planning involve the application of scientific and technical processes, considerations, and methods used in planning for land use, urban design, natural resources, transportation, and infrastructure. Urban planning includes techniques such as: predicting population growth, zoning, geographic mapping and analysis, analyzing park space, surveying the water supply, identifying transportation patterns, recognizing food supply demands, allocating healthcare and social services, and analyzing the impact of land use.

In order to predict how cities will develop and estimate the effects of their interventions, planners use various models. These models can be used to indicate relationships and patterns in demographic, geographic, and economic data. They might deal with short-term issues such as how people move through cities, or long-term issues such as land use and growth. One such model is the Geographic Information System (GIS) which is used to model existing planning conditions and project future impacts on society, the economy, and the environment.

Building codes and other regulations complement urban planning by governing how cities are constructed and used at the individual level. Enforcement methodologies include governmental zoning, planning permissions, and building codes, as well as private easements and restrictive covenants.

In urban planning, technical tools increasingly include incentive-based regulatory frameworks alongside zoning and building codes. Research on urban policies shows that financial, non-financial, and social incentives shape planning outcomes only when embedded in appropriate institutional and regulatory configurations. Rather than operating automatically, incentives interact with local rules, governance arrangements, and collective action capacities. Comparative urban studies highlight that effective planning depends on coordinated incentive systems, trust, monitoring mechanisms, and stakeholder co-production, rather than on isolated economic stimuli. This approach emphasizes the regulation of incentives themselves as a technical dimension of strategic urban planning.

Recent advances in urban planning include the use of urban digital twins (UDTs), which leverage artificial intelligence (AI) and the Internet of Things (IoT) to simulate and predict urban development scenarios. These technologies enable planners to collect real-time data, predict population growth, traffic patterns, and assess the environmental impact of urban interventions. AI and IoT are also employed to optimize resource allocation and improve sustainability by offering data-driven insights for long-term urban development planning

With recent advances in information and communication technologies and the Internet of Things, an increasing number of cities are adopting technologies such as crowdsourced mobile phone sensing and machine learning to collect data and extract useful information to help make informed urban planning decisions.

== Urban planners ==
An urban planner is a professional who works in the field of urban planning for the purpose of optimizing the effectiveness of a community's land use and infrastructure. They formulate plans for the development and management of urban and suburban areas. They typically analyze land use compatibility as well as economic, environmental, and social trends. In developing any plan for a community (whether commercial, residential, agricultural, natural or recreational), urban planners must consider a wide array of issues including sustainability, existing and potential pollution, transport including potential congestion, crime, land values, economic development, social equity, zoning codes, and other legislation.

The importance of the urban planner is increasing in the 21st century, as modern society begins to face issues of increased population growth, climate change and unsustainable development. An urban planner could be considered a green collar professional.

Some researchers suggest that urban planners, globally, work in different "planning cultures", adapted to their cities and cultures. However, professionals have identified skills, abilities, and basic knowledge sets that are common to urban planners across regional and national boundaries.

== Criticisms and debates ==
The school of neoclassical economics argues that planning is unnecessary, or even harmful, as market efficiency allows for effective land use. A pluralist strain of political thinking argues in a similar vein that the government should not intrude in the political competition between different interest groups which decides how land is used. The traditional justification for urban planning has in response been that the planner does to the city what the engineer or architect does to the home, that is, make it more amenable to the needs and preferences of its inhabitants. Planning implies control is exercised to ensure development conforms to a plan.

The widely adopted consensus-building model of planning, which seeks to accommodate different preferences within the community has been criticized for being based upon, rather than challenging, the power structures of the community. Instead, agonism has been proposed as a framework for urban planning decision-making.

Another debate within the urban planning field is about who is included and excluded in the urban planning decision-making process. Most urban planning processes use a top-down approach which fails to include the residents of the places where urban planners and city officials are working. Sherry Arnstein's "ladder of citizen participation" is often used by many urban planners and city governments to determine the degree of inclusivity or exclusivity of their urban planning. One main source of engagement between city officials and residents are city council meetings that are open to the residents and that welcome public comments. Additionally, in US there are some federal requirements for citizen participation in government-funded infrastructure projects.

Participatory urban planning has been criticized for contributing to the housing crisis in parts of the world.

== See also ==
- Air pollution
- Aire de mise en valeur de l'architecture et du paysage
- Behavioral urbanism
- Bicycle-friendly
- Blue space
- Circulation planning
- Curb cut effect
- Cycling infrastructure
- Development studies
- Domestic travel restrictions
- Epidemiology
- Green urbanism
- Hazard mitigation
- Index of urban planning articles
- Land recycling
- Landscape urbanism
- List of planned cities
- List of planning journals
- List of urban planners
- List of urban plans
- List of urban theorists
- Living street
- Low emission zone
- NIMBY
- New Urbanism
- Noise pollution
- Permeability
- Planning cultures
- Regional planning
- Road traffic safety
- Reurbanisation
- Rural development
- Tactical urbanism
- Smart city
- Sociotope
- Sponge city
- Street reclamation
- Stroad
- Sustainable urbanism
- Universal design
- Urban density
- Urban economics
- Urban planning education
- Urban green space
- Dark infrastructure
- Urban history
- Urban informatics
- Urban planning in communist countries
- Urban studies
- Urban theory
- Urban vitality
- Urbanism
- YIMBY
- Walkability
- Walking audit
- World Urbanism Day
