= Ethos Technologies =

American insurance technology company

Ethos
- Company type: Public
- Traded as: Nasdaq: LIFE
- Industry: Financial technology
- Founded: 2016; 10 years ago
- Founders: Peter Colis, Lingke Wang
- Headquarters: Austin, Texas, United States
- Key people: Peter Colis (CEO)
- Products: Life insurance
- Website: www.ethos.com

Ethos Life Insurance (Ethos) is an American insurance technology company. The company was founded in 2016, and is headquartered in Austin, Texas.

== History ==
Ethos was founded in 2016 by Peter Colis and Lingke Wang. The company's strategy was to simplify the process of buying life insurance, including eliminating medical exams.

In July 2021, the company was valued at $2.7 billion after a $100 million investment from Japanese investment holding company Softbank.

In September 2025, Ethos filed for an IPO. On January 29, 2026, it went public on the Nasdaq with a $1.2 billion valuation.

== Products ==
Ethos develops machine learning and data science technology to help customers buy life insurance policies online. The company is not itself an insurer, but develops a platform and underwriting engine designed to streamline the buying, selling and risk management of life insurance.
