= Ethos (magazine) =

Former British biannual magazine

- Frequency: Biannual
- Founded: 2007
- Final issue: 2014
- Company: Sunday Publishing for Serco
- Country: United Kingdom
- Based in: London
- Language: English
- Website: ethosjournal.com

Ethos was a biannual magazine published between 2007 and 2014 for Serco Group plc by Sunday Publishing Ltd. The stated aim of Ethos was to "stimulate thought and provoke reaction to the big issues shaping the world of public services" while the publisher's brief was to "position Serco at the forefront of debate about the design and delivery of the UK’s public services". Ethos was published online every month and in print twice a year.

== Contributors ==
Contributors were drawn from across the political spectrum including journalists, academics, politicians, experts, think tanks and industry leaders. They included Jane Dudman, Mark Easton, Hugh Orde, Christian Wolmar, Polly Toynbee and John Rentoul. Ethos also featured UK think tank leaders, including ResPublica's director Phillip Blond and Andrew Haldenby, director of Reform.

== Topics ==
Ethos covered issues surrounding public services, from health to local government and justice to transport, with a UK focus but bringing in relevant insights and perspectives from overseas. During 2012/13 a series of articles examined the structure, design, challenges and successes of different models of public service delivery. Joint venture, government-owned, contractor-operated (GoCo) and mutuals were amongst the models covered.

== Awards ==
In 2011, 2012 and 2014, Ethos was awarded ‘Best public sector/government title’ at the International Content Marketing Awards, the customer publishing industry’s annual awards ceremony. Judges at the 2012 awards were impressed both by the quality of content and the high-class contributors, saying “It doesn’t just pay lip service to key issues; it tries to achieve real change.”

== Closure ==
As of April 2015 the Serco website states that the Ethos journal and website have ceased publication.
