= Glienicke =

Glienicke may refer to the following places in Germany:

- Glienicke Palace, a historic palace in Berlin-Wannsee in Germany
  - Glienicke Bridge
  - Jagdschloss Glienicke, a hunting castle
- Glienicke/Nordbahn, a municipality in the Oberhavel district, in Brandenburg, Germany

== See also ==
- Altglienicke, a locality of Berlin
- Groß Glienicke, a village in Potsdam and Berlin
- Klein Glienicke, part of Potsdam
