= List of tourist attractions in Potsdam =

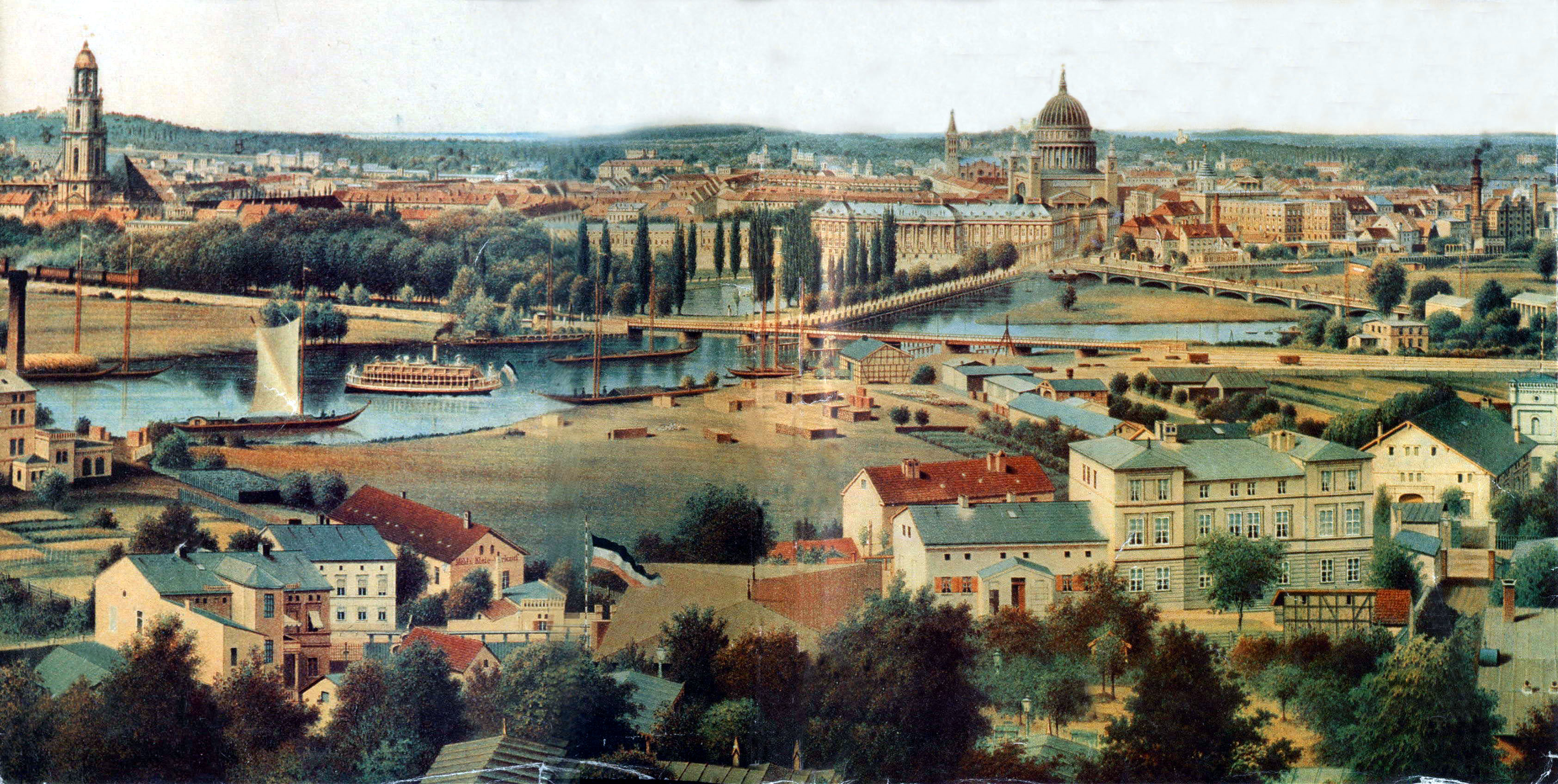
1871 view of the city with the Garrison Church, Stadtschloss and St. Nicholas' Church

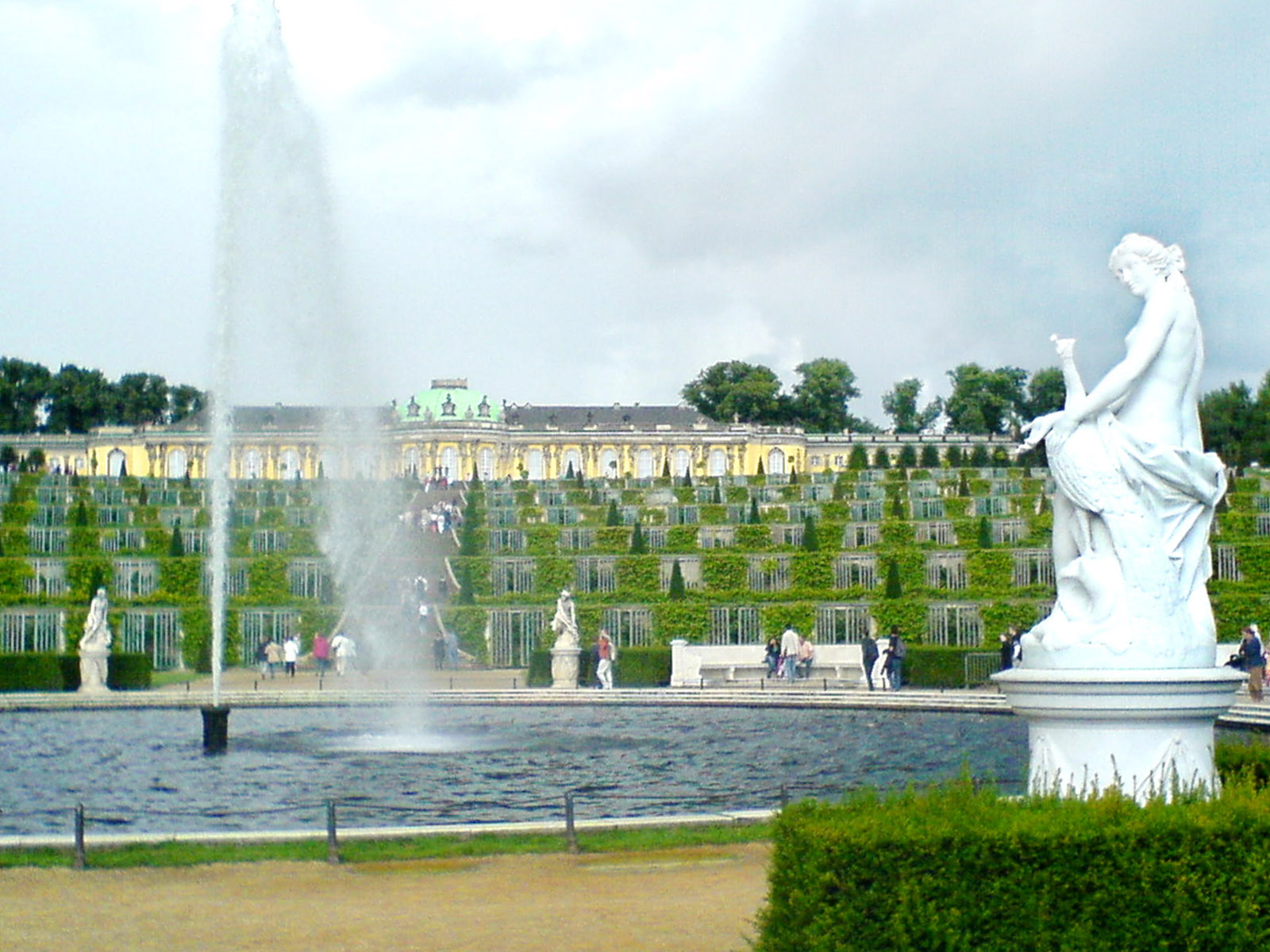
Sanssouci Palace and the vineyard.

The following is a list of sights of Potsdam, the capital of the German state of Brandenburg in Germany.

== Sanssouci Park ==
The historic park of Sanssouci covers an area of about 290 hectares and is thus the largest and best known in the March of Brandenburg. In the 18th and 19th centuries, Frederick the Great and Frederick William IV influenced the park in the contemporary architectural styles of Rococo and Classicism and had an artistic synthesis of architecture and gardens constructed, whose centrepiece is the vineyard terraces and the palace of Sanssouci that crowns them.

- Sanssouci Palace (built 1745 to 1747, symbol of the town)
- New Palace (Neues Palais) (1763 to 1769)
- Charlottenhof Palace (Schloss Charlottenhof) (1826 to 1829)
- Orangery Palace (Orangerieschloss), also called the Orangery (Orangerie) or New Orangery (Neue Orangerie) (1851 to 1864)
- New Chambers (Neue Kammern) (1771 to 1775)
- Sanssouci Picture Gallery (Bildergalerie) (1755 to 1764)
- Chinese House (Chinesisches Haus) (1755 to 1764)
- Church of Peace (Friedenskirche) (1845 to 1848)
- Antique Temple (Antikentempel) (1768/1769)
- Temple of Friendship (Freundschaftstempel) (1768 to 1770)
- Roman Baths (Römische Bäder) (1829 to 1840)
- Belvedere on the Klausberg (Belvedere auf dem Klausberg) (1770 to 1772)
- Dragon House (Drachenhaus) on the Klausberg (1770 to 1772)
- Historic Mill of Sanssouci (1736 to 1739, first rebuilding begun 1790, destroyed during fighting in 1945, rebuilt in 1983 and from 1990 to 1993)
- Neptune Grotto (Neptungrotte) (from 1751)
- Green Gate (Grünes Gitter) at the park entrance
- Botanical Garden, Potsdam
- No longer accessible: The "Fort in the Park" of Sanssouci (1893). A model fort near the New Palace. Filled in since 2004.
- Pheasantry (Fasanerie)
- Bornstedt Crown Estate, a former royal estate and nowadays a living history centre.
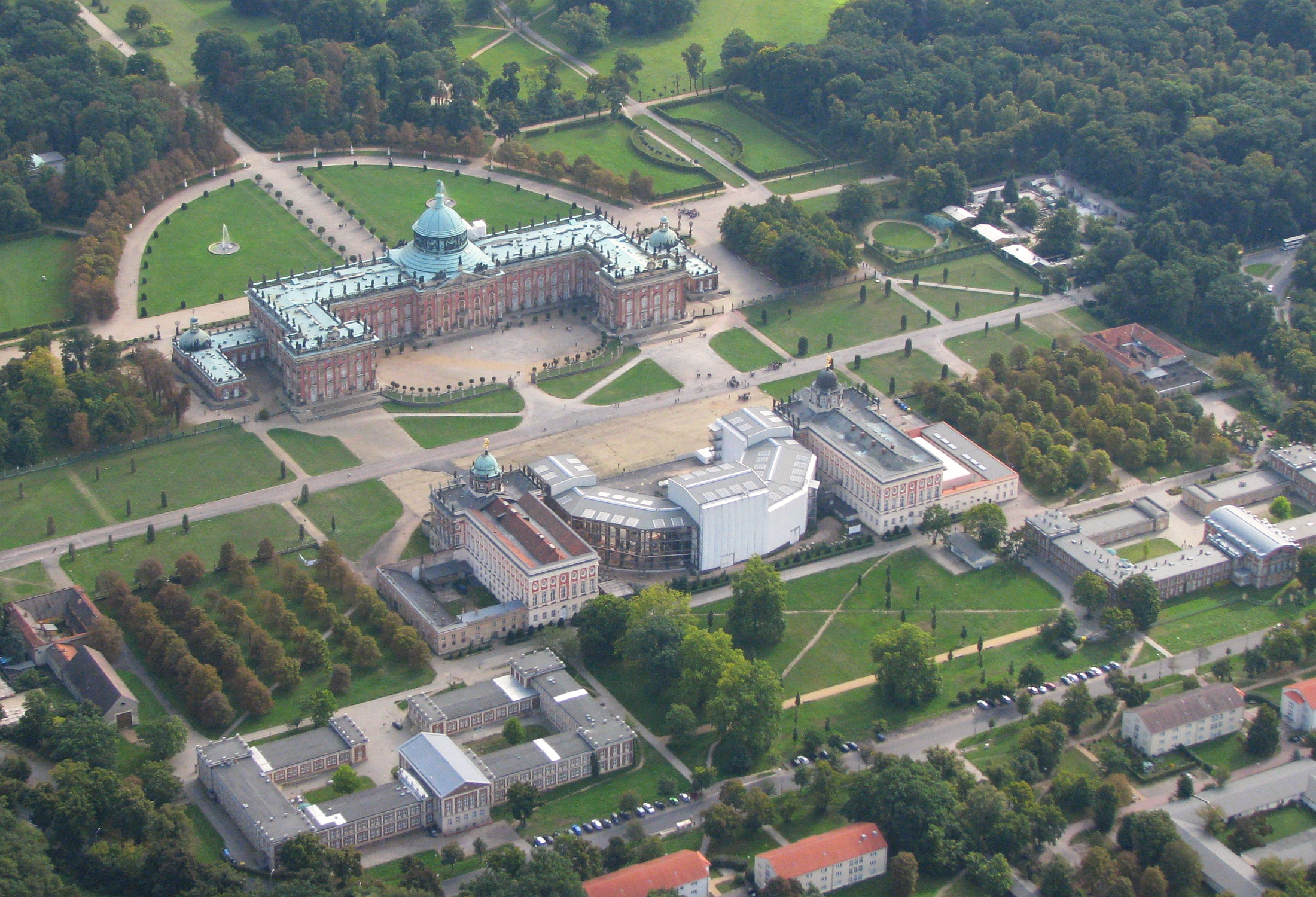
New Palace

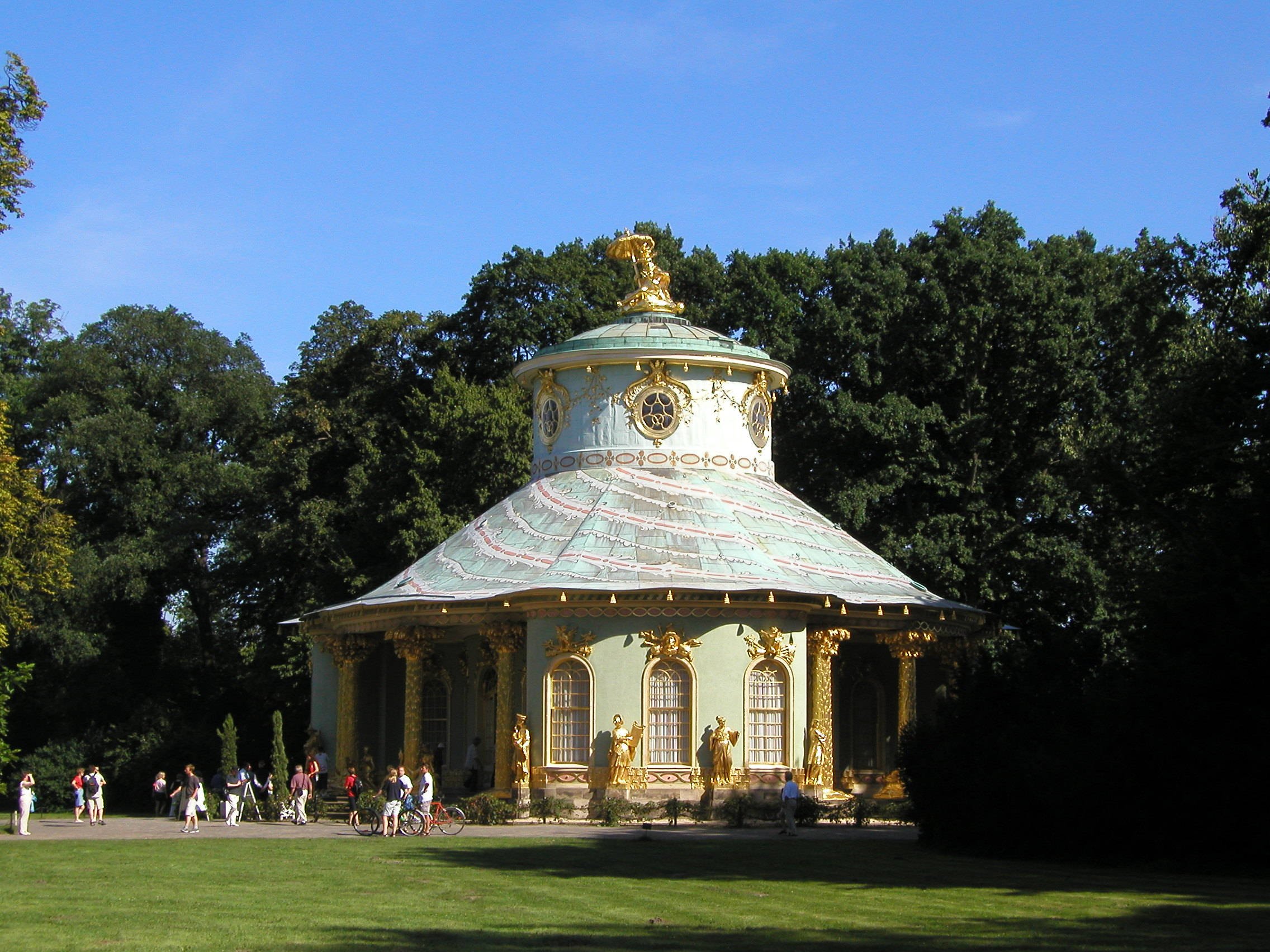
Chinese House

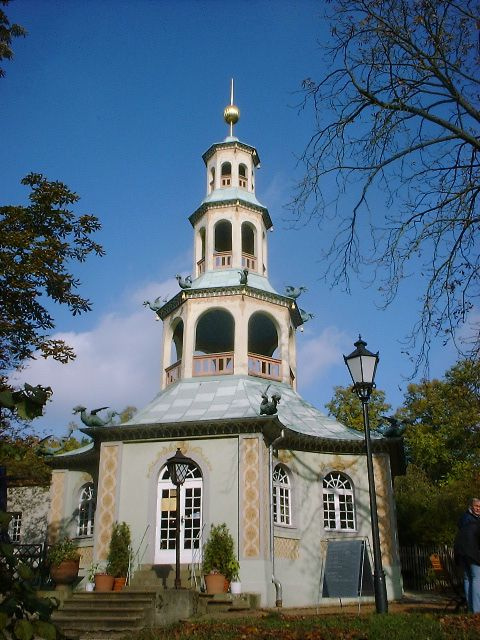
Dragon House

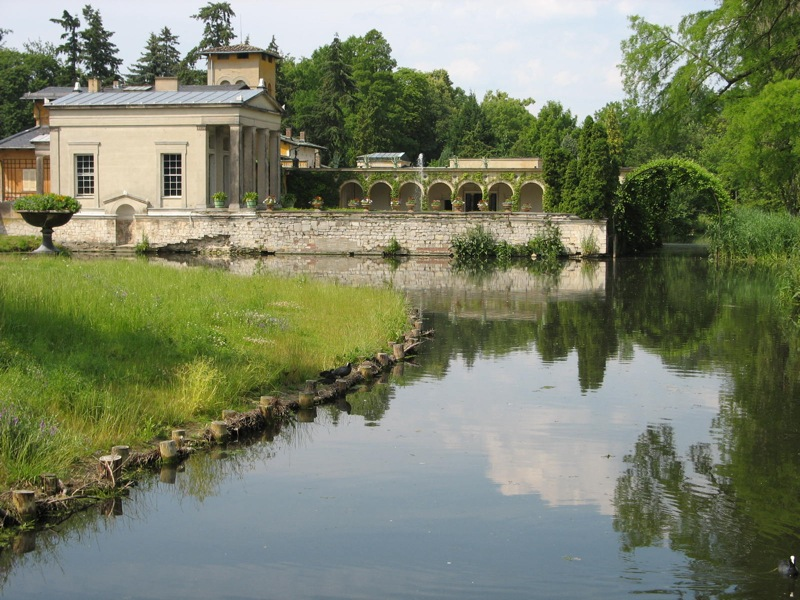
Roman Baths

== New Garden ==
The New Garden (Neuer Garten) is a park, roughly 100 ha in area, that lies in the north of Potsdam and borders on the lakes of Heiliger See and the Jungfernsee. In 1787 Frederick William II had a new garden laid out on this site, hence the name. The park was intended to reflect the prevailing fashion for the English garden, in contrast to the outmoded style of the Baroque ornamental and vegetable garden at Sanssouci.

- New Garten (Neuer Garten) (laid out from 1787)
- Marble Palace (Marmorpalais) (1787 to 1792)
- Palace kitchen, in the shape of a temple ruin (1788 to 1790)
- Orangery (1791 to 1793)
- Gothic Library (1792 to 1794)
- Pyramids (1791 to 1792)
- Dairy (1790 to 1792)
- Crystal and Shell Grotto (Crystall- and Muschelgrotte) (1791/92)
- Dutch Quarter (Holländisches Etablissement) - houses in Dutch style
- Garden houses: the White, Brown, Red and Green House
- Cecilienhof Palace (Schloss Cecilienhof) (1914 to 1917)
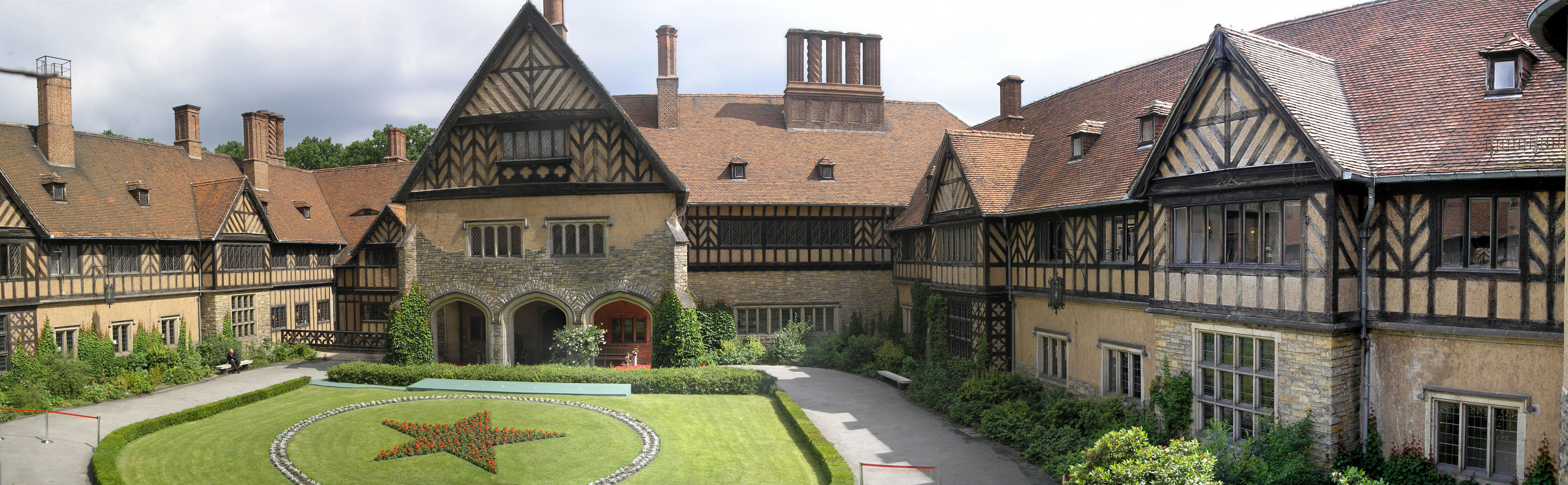
Cecilienhof Palace

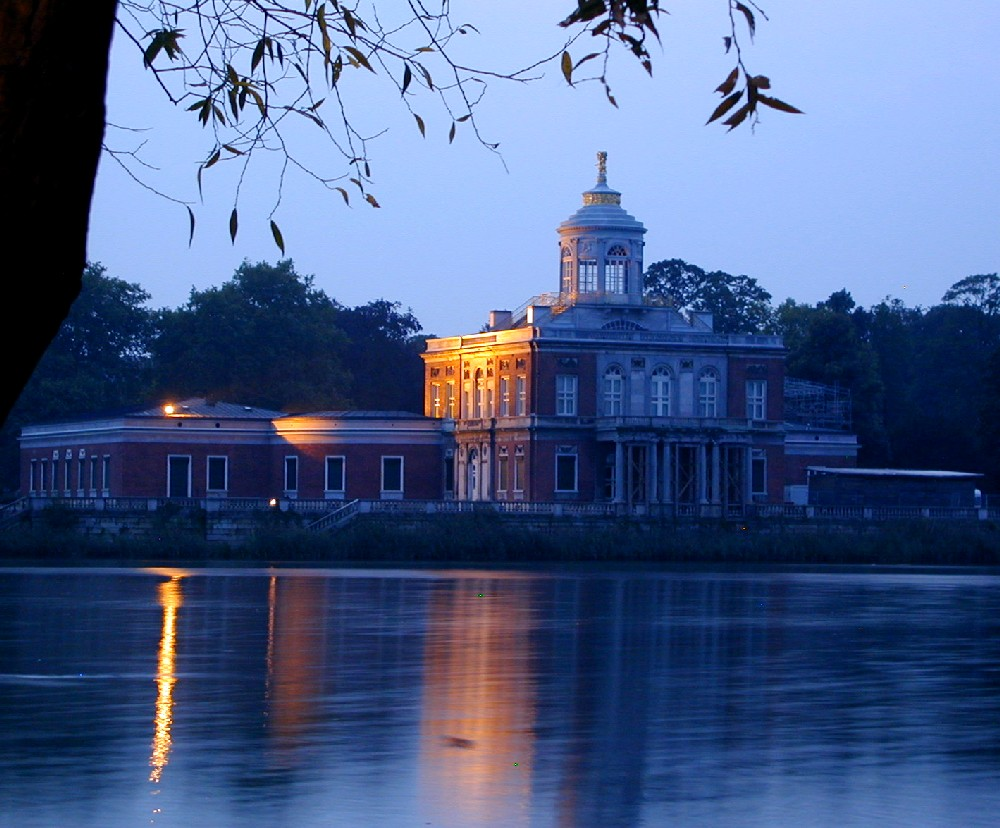
Marble Palace

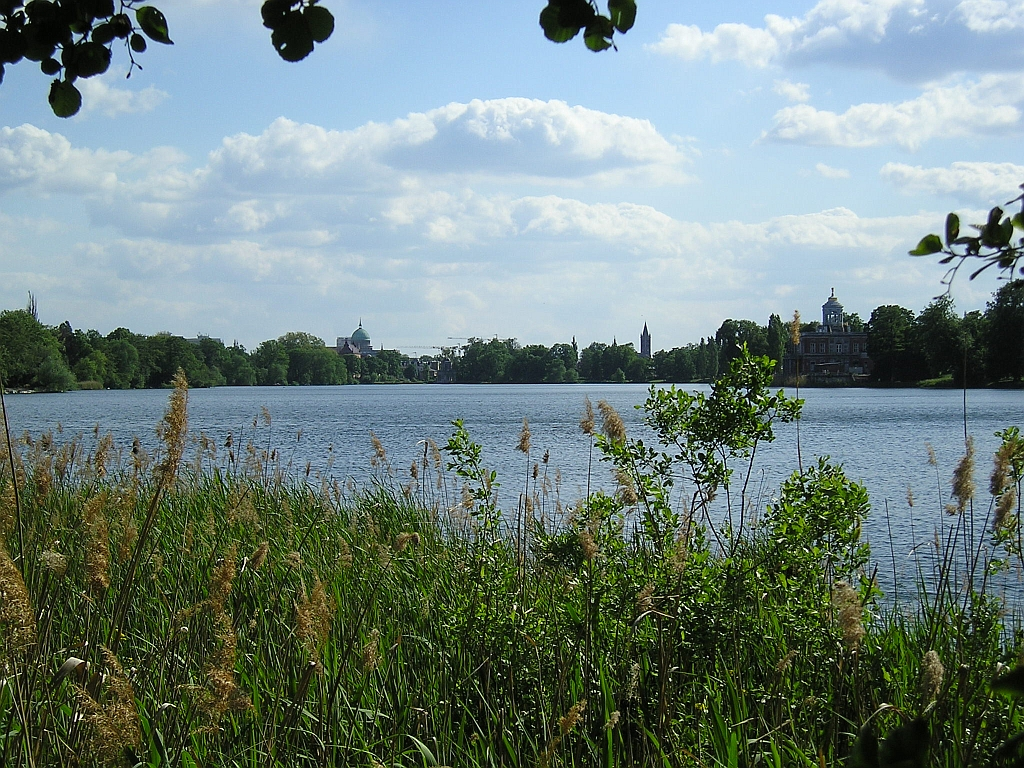
Heiliger See

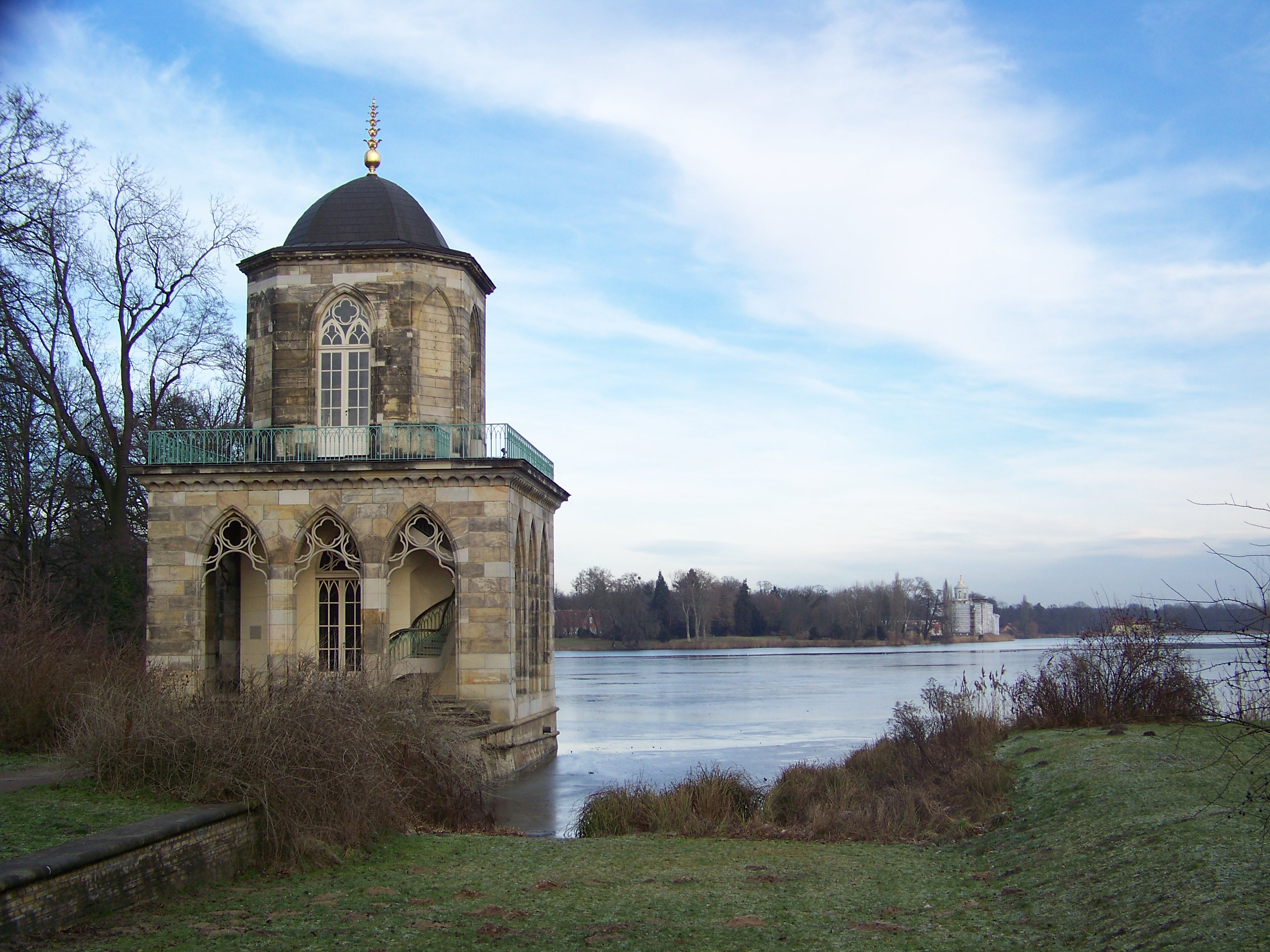
Gothic Library

== Babelsberg Park ==
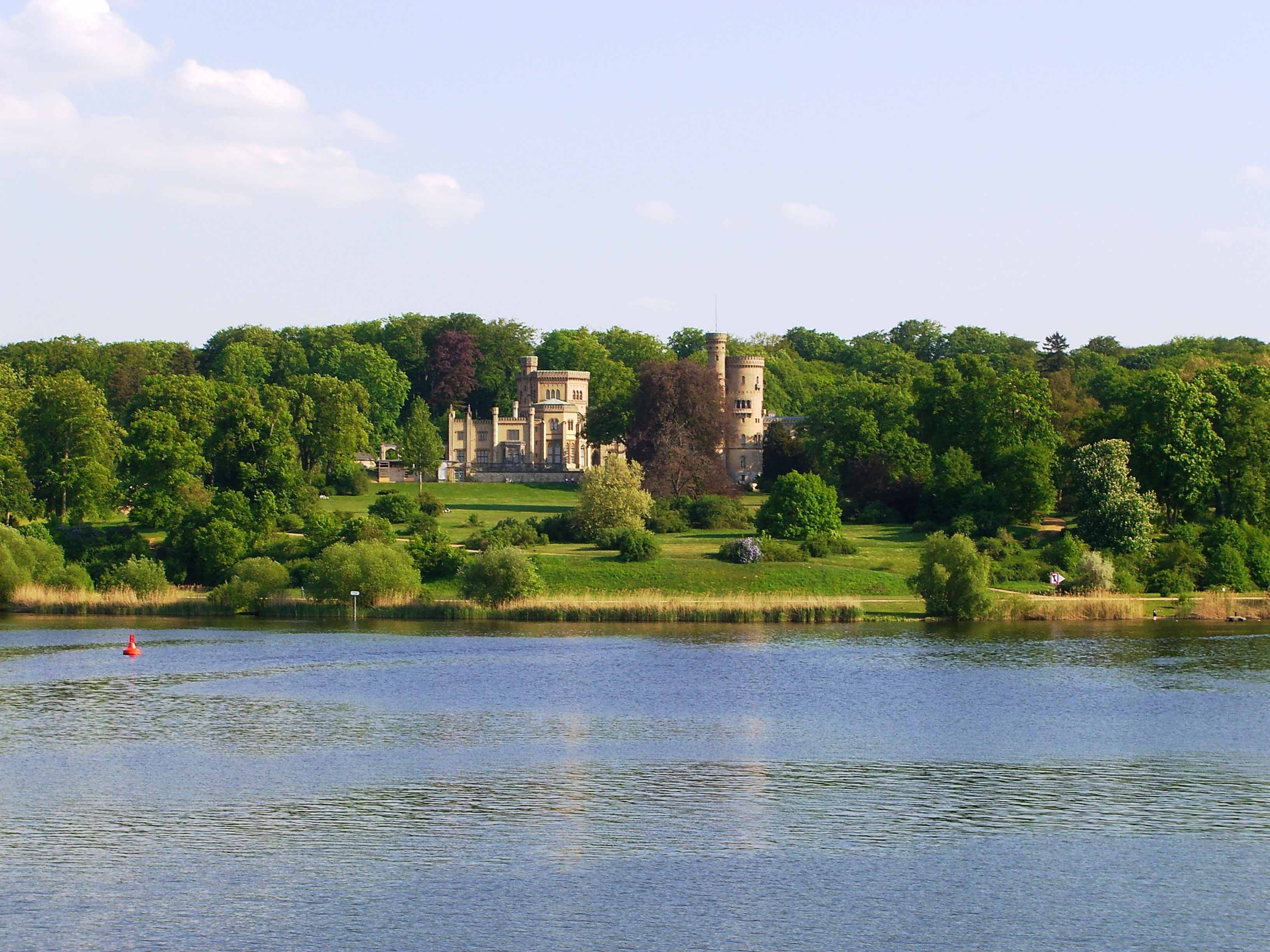
Babelsberg Palace on the Havel.

Bordering the Tiefer See on the River Havel lies Babelsberg Park, covering an area of 114 hectares. In 1833, on the order of Prince William, later Emperor William I and his wife, Augusta the landscape gardener, Peter Joseph Lenné, and Prince Hermann of Pückler-Muskau began turning the rolling terrain that sloped down towards the lake into a park.

- Babelsberg Park (started 1833)
- Royal Stables (Marstall) (1834 to 1839 and 1861)
- Babelsberg Palace (1835 to 1849)
- Little Palace (Kleines Palace) (1841/42)
- Sailors' House (Matrosenhaus) (1842)
- Steam-powered Pumping Station (Dampfmaschinenhaus) (1843 to 1845)
- Flatow Tower (Flatowturm) (1853 to 1856)
- Court Arcade (Gerichtslaube) (1871)

== Other parks and gardens ==
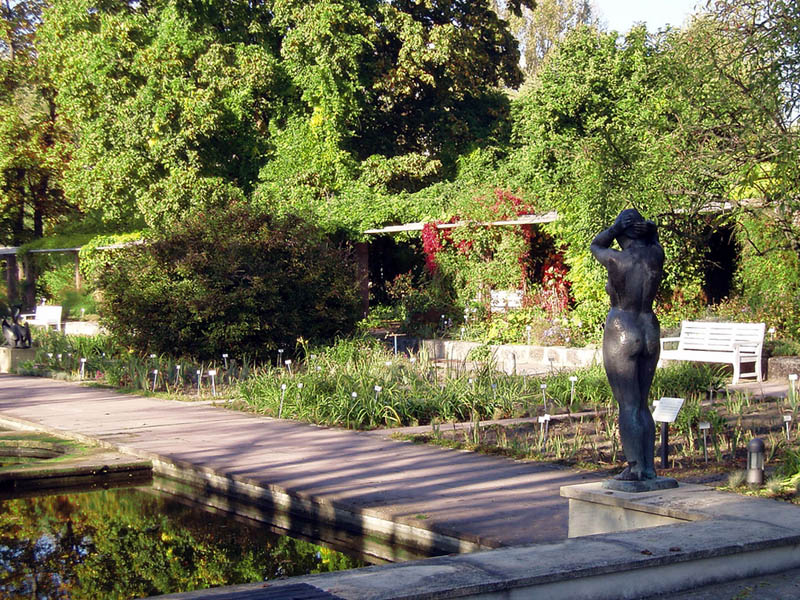
Island of Friendship

- Island of Friendship (Freundschaftsinsel) in the centre of the city with the Karl Foerster perennial garden.
- Karl Foerster Garden in Potsdam-Bornim with its private residence.
- Pleasure Garden (Lustgarten), the oldest garden in Potsdam, originally part of the City Palace (Stadtschloss) site
- Potsdam Municipal Park (Volkspark Potsdam) on the old 2001 Federal Garden Show site with the Potsdam Biosphere, a commercially run park.
- Potsdam Wildlife Park (Wildpark, 1834 to 1838), one of the oldest examples of the linkage of courtly tradition and landscape gardening. The wildlife park has an area of over 875 hectares and is located west of Sanssouci Park.
- Bornstedt Cemetery, more-than-400-year-old park with Italian-like church. Amongst those buried here are Ferdinand von Arnim, Peter Joseph Lenné and Ludwig Persius.

== Churches ==
The Prussian tolerance, which is highly visible in the city, is also expressed by Potsdam's churches: In the centre of Protestant Potsdam, stands a large Roman Catholic church, and the oldest Russian Orthodox Church in Germany is found here. Churches were built for settlers from various corners of Europe: the Swiss, French, Bohemians ...

- St. Nicholas' Church, (1830 to 1837). A giant domed building based on cathedrals in Rome, London and Paris, on the Old Market Square, consecrated in 1837, architects: Schinkel, Persius and Stüler.
- Garrison Church, reconstruction began in 2017
- French Church, (1752/1753). Based on the Roman Pantheon and built for French settlers, consecrated in 1753, builders: restored by Knobelsdorff, Boumann, in the past years.
- Roman Catholic Priory Church of St. Peter and Paul, (1867 to 1870). Like a campanile writ large, the church stands at the end of the Potsdam Bummelboulevard, consecrated in 1870, builders: Stüler, Salzenberg.
- Church of Peace in Sanssouci Park, (1845 to 1854). This church was established at the entrance to Sanssouci Park like a medieval Italian monastery, consecrated in 1848, builders: Persius, von Arnim, Hesse, Stüler.
- Church of the Redeemer, well outside the town centre, on the banks of the Havel, in the style of an Italian basilica, stood for years in the shadow of the wall in no-man's land, consecrated in 1844, architect: Persius.
- Alexander Nevsky Memorial Church built for the Russian residents of the settlement of Alexandrowka below the Kapellenberg, used without interruption, consecrated 1829, oldest Russian Orthodox church in Germany, architects: Vasily Stasov (design), Karl Friedrich Schinkel.
- Church of Our Saviour (Erlöserkirche). Evangelical church in Potsdam-West, consecrated in 1898, builder: Möckel
- Church of Christ, wedged between residential buildings continues to be the one-time Old Lutheran church, consecrated in 1903. Today the church is used independent Evangelical-Lutheran Church of Christ parish (SELK). Builder: Grabowsky.
- Pentecostal Church, (1894). This church stands between [g] and the New Garden in an idyllic garden setting, consecrated in 1894, architect: Tiedemann.
- Hermannswerder Island Church, a Neogothic building that belongs to the Hoffbauer Foundation, consecrated in 1911, builder: Gebrüder Bolle.
- Frederick Church on the Weberplatz, (1752/1753). Centrepiece of a settlement for Bohemian weavers in Babelsberg (formerly Nowawes), consecrated in 1753, builder: Boumann.
- Oberlin Church, Babelsberg, (1904/1905). focal point of the Oberlinhaus, inter alia a lyceum for deaf-blind people, consecrated in 1905, builder: Tiedemann.
- Old Neuendorf Church in Babelsberg, built 1850–52, rebuilding started in 1998
- Parish Church of St. Anthony, Roman Catholic church for Babelsberg, consecrated in 1934, architect: Fahlbusch.
- Chapel of Klein-Glienicke, near the city's boundary with Berlin, which meant that the church fell into ruin as a result of its proximity to the Berlin Wall, consecrated in 1881, architect: Reinhold Persius.
- Bornstedt Church, Italianate church that watches over the graves of famous Potsdam townsfolk, consecrated in 1856, builder: Stüler.
- other village churches in the incorporated villages:
  - Bornim (1902/1903, consecrated 1903). Architect: Tiedemann
  - Eiche (1771)
  - Grube (1746)
  - Nattwerder (1690 – the oldest surviving church in Potsdam)
  - Drewitz (1732)
- and the churches in the new districts:
  - Stern Church (1990)
  - Church of Atonement, Kirchsteigfeld (1997)
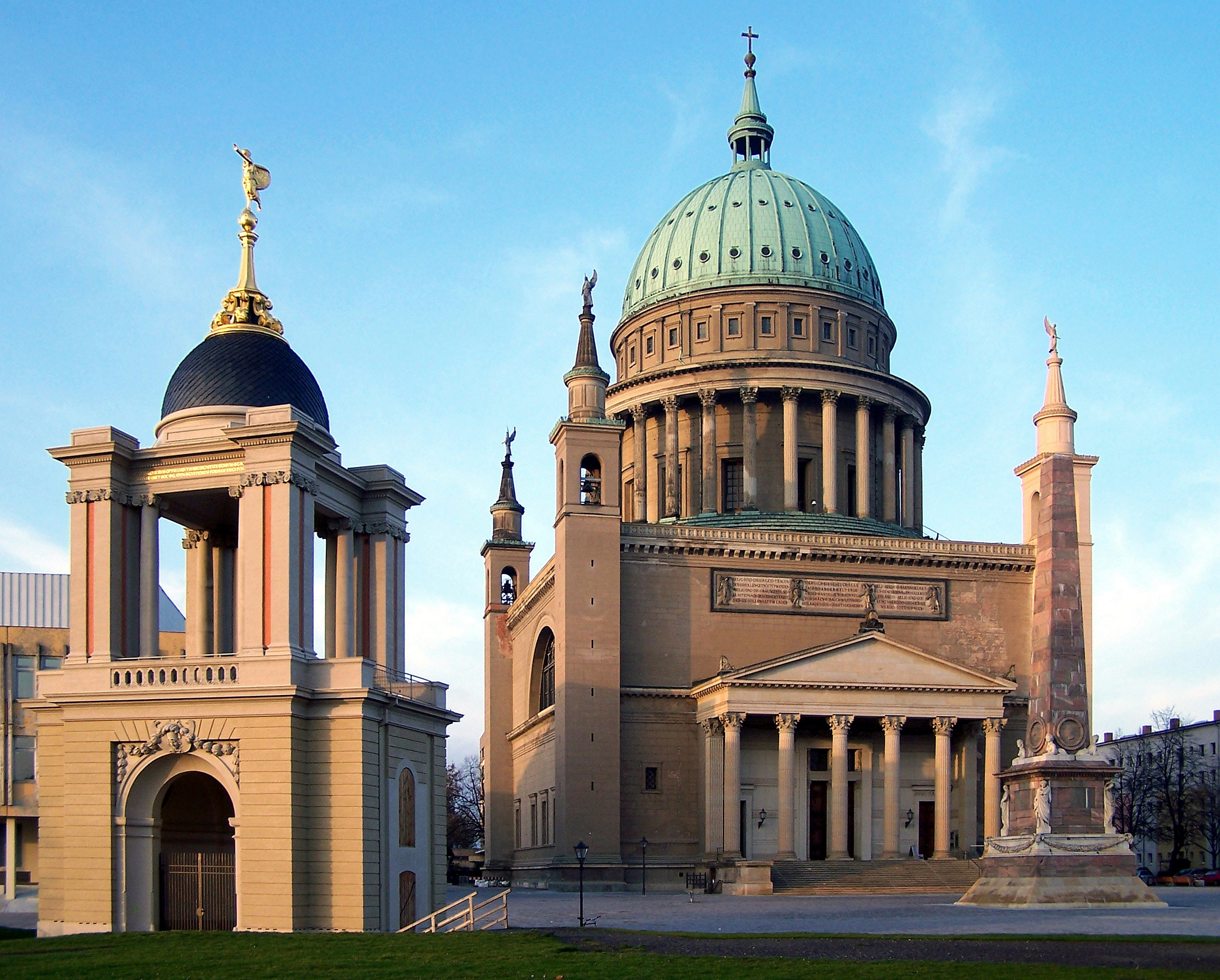
St. Nicholas' Church

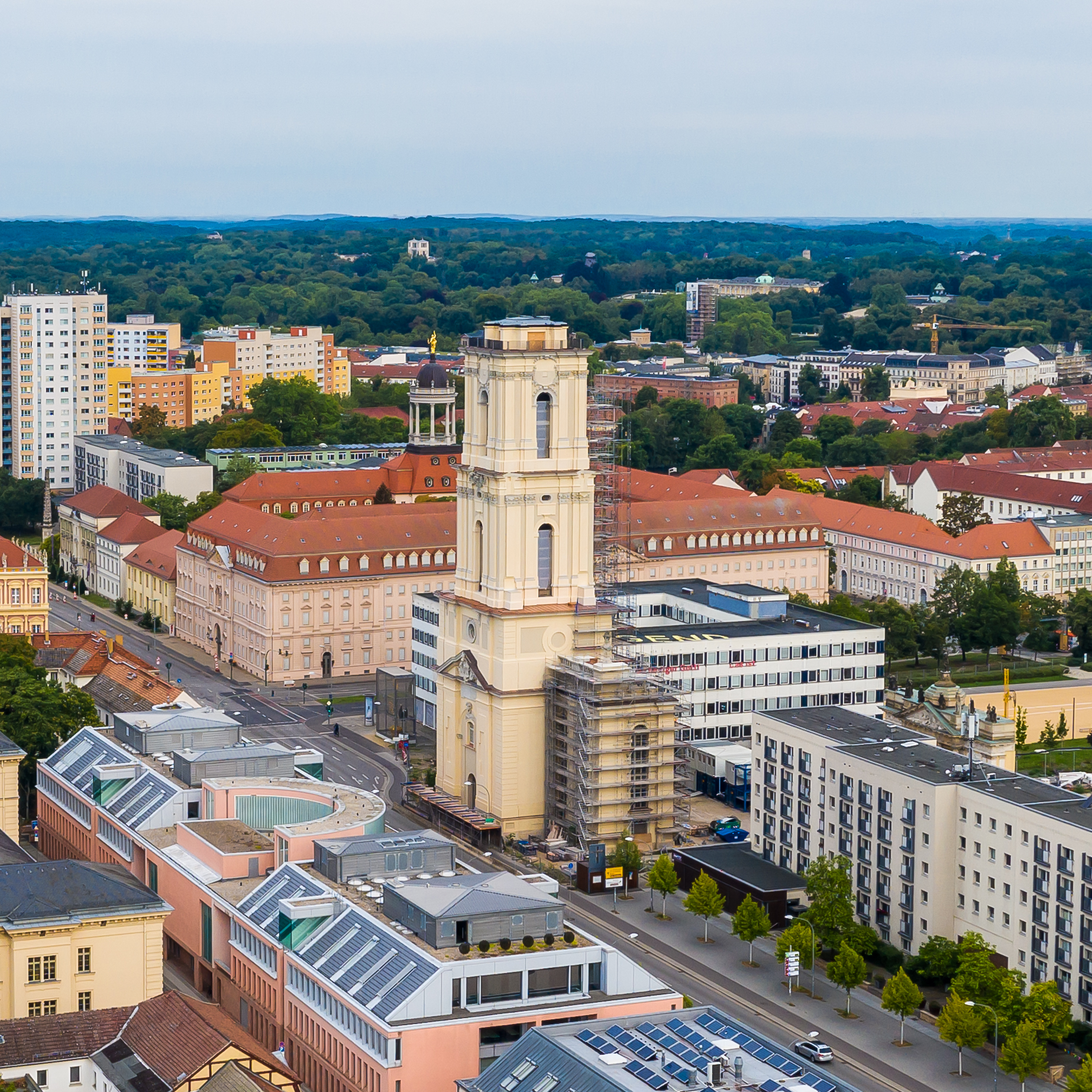
Garrison Church

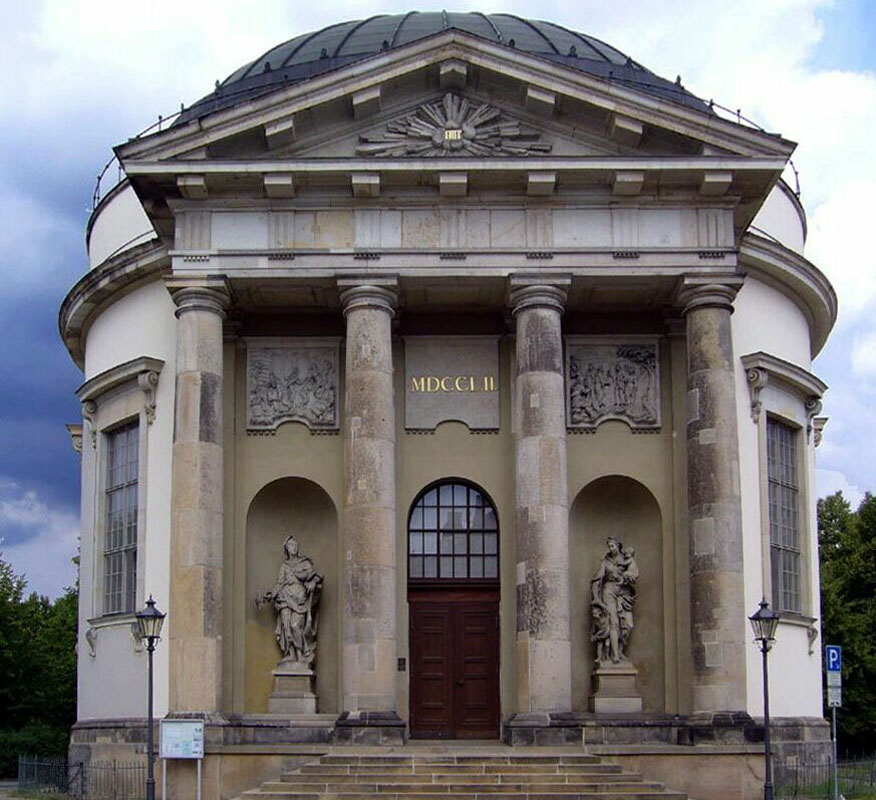
French Church

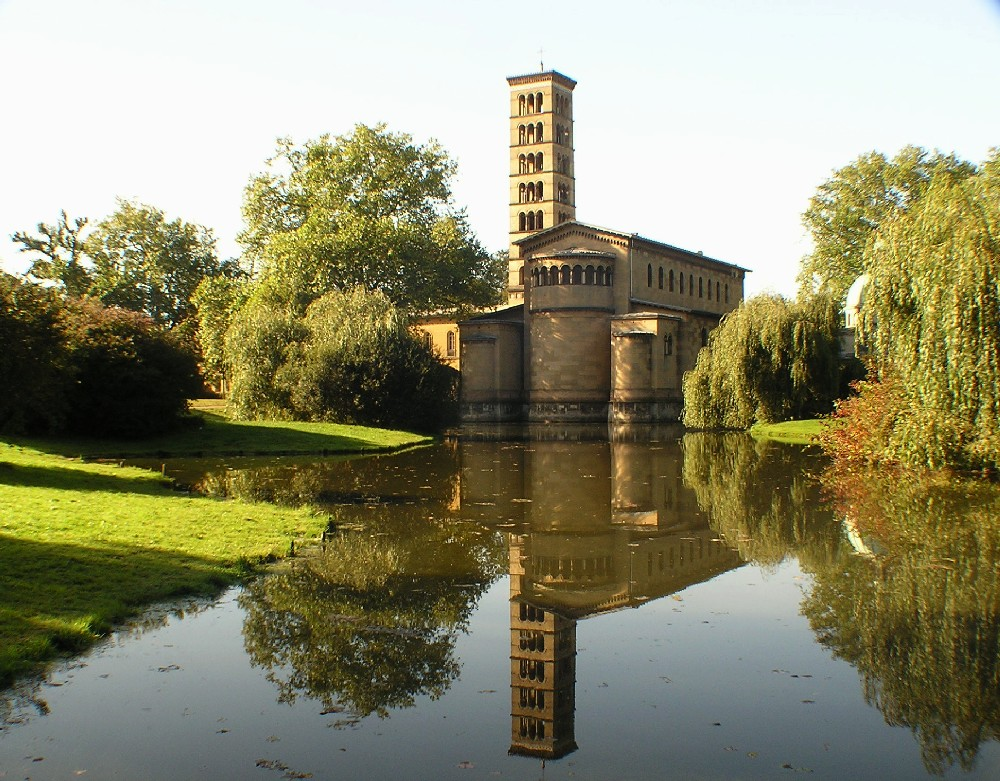
Church of Peace

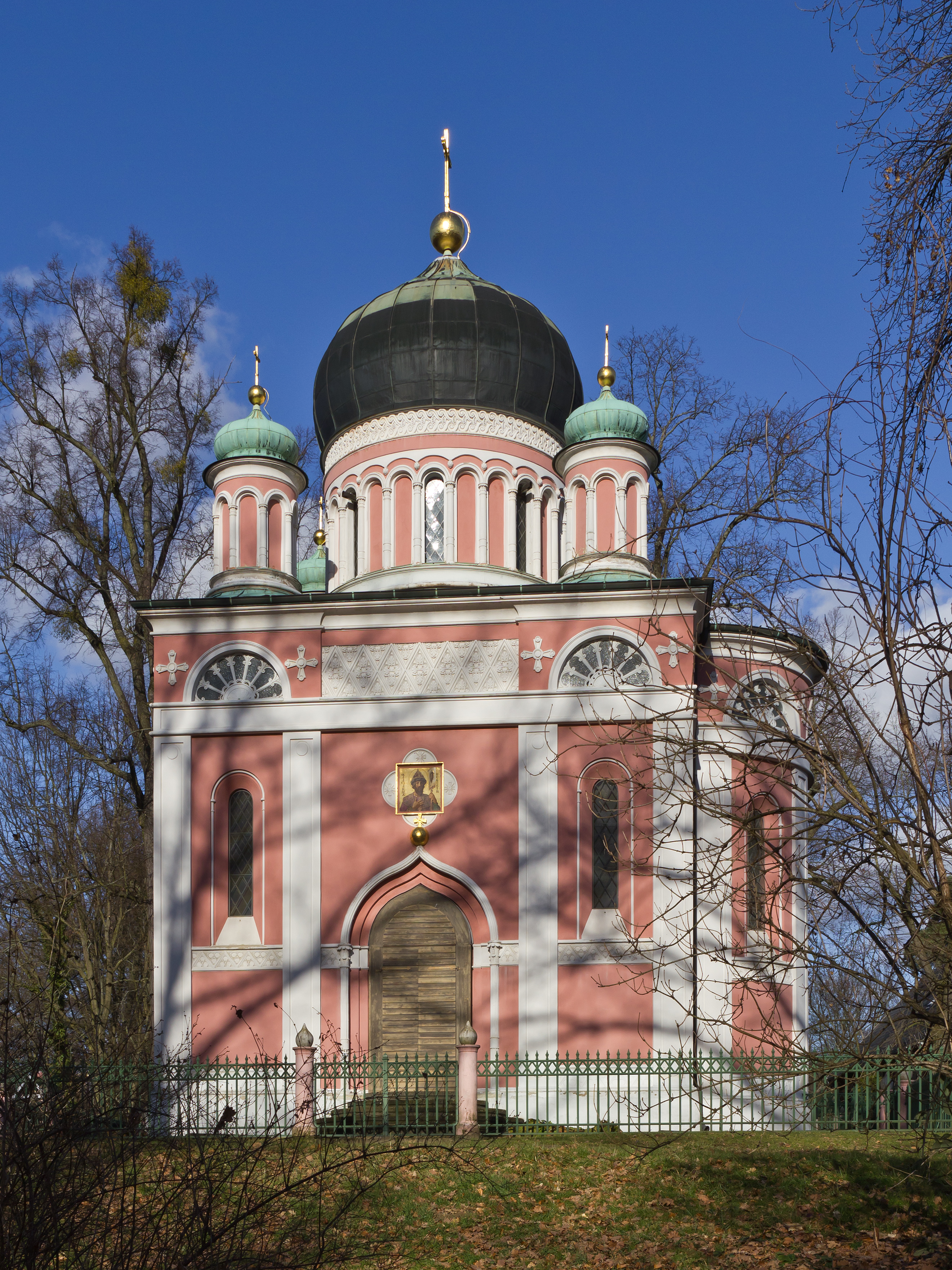
Russian Orthodox church

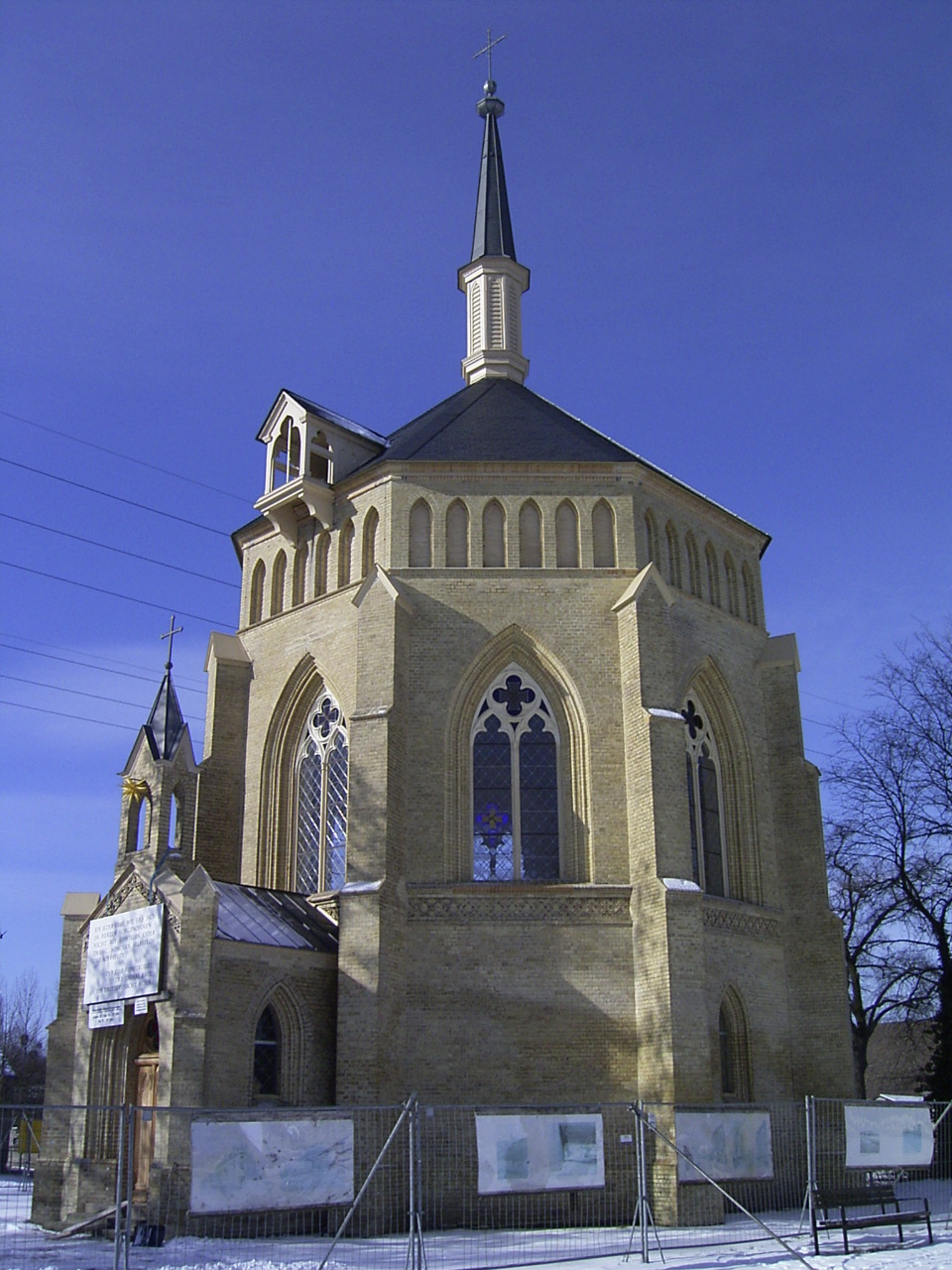
Neuendorf Church

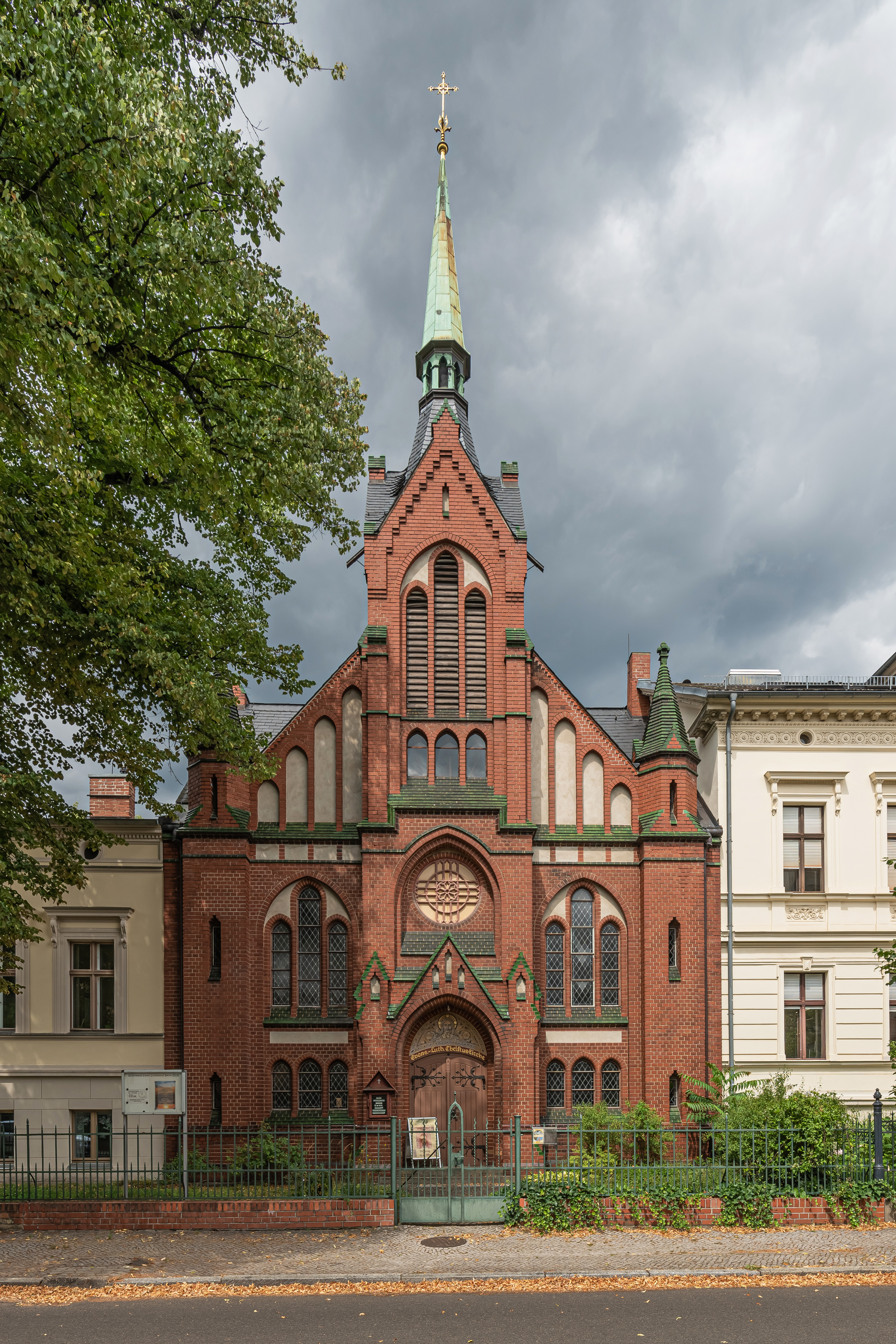
Evangelical-Lutheran Church of Christ

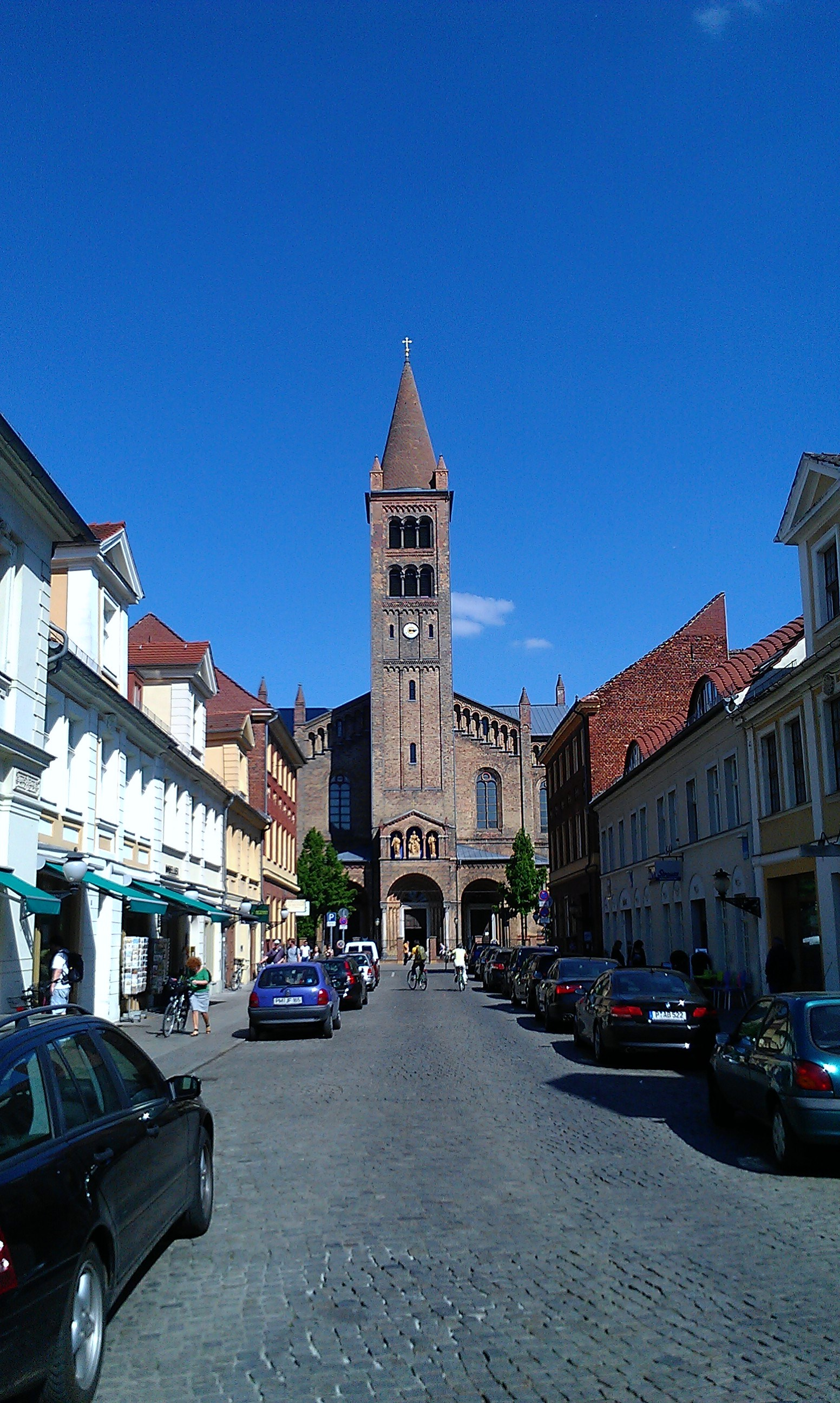
Church of St. Peter and Paul

== City gates ==
As a garrison city Potsdam had a city wall with several gates. With their flamboyant architectural styles they were more built for show that for defence. Of the city gates only three have survived.

- Brandenburg Gate (1770)
- Nauen Gate: construction plans by Johann Gottfried Büring based on 1754 sketches by King Frederick II of Prussia. First example of Neogothic in continental Europe.
- Jägertor ("Hunters' Gate", 1733)
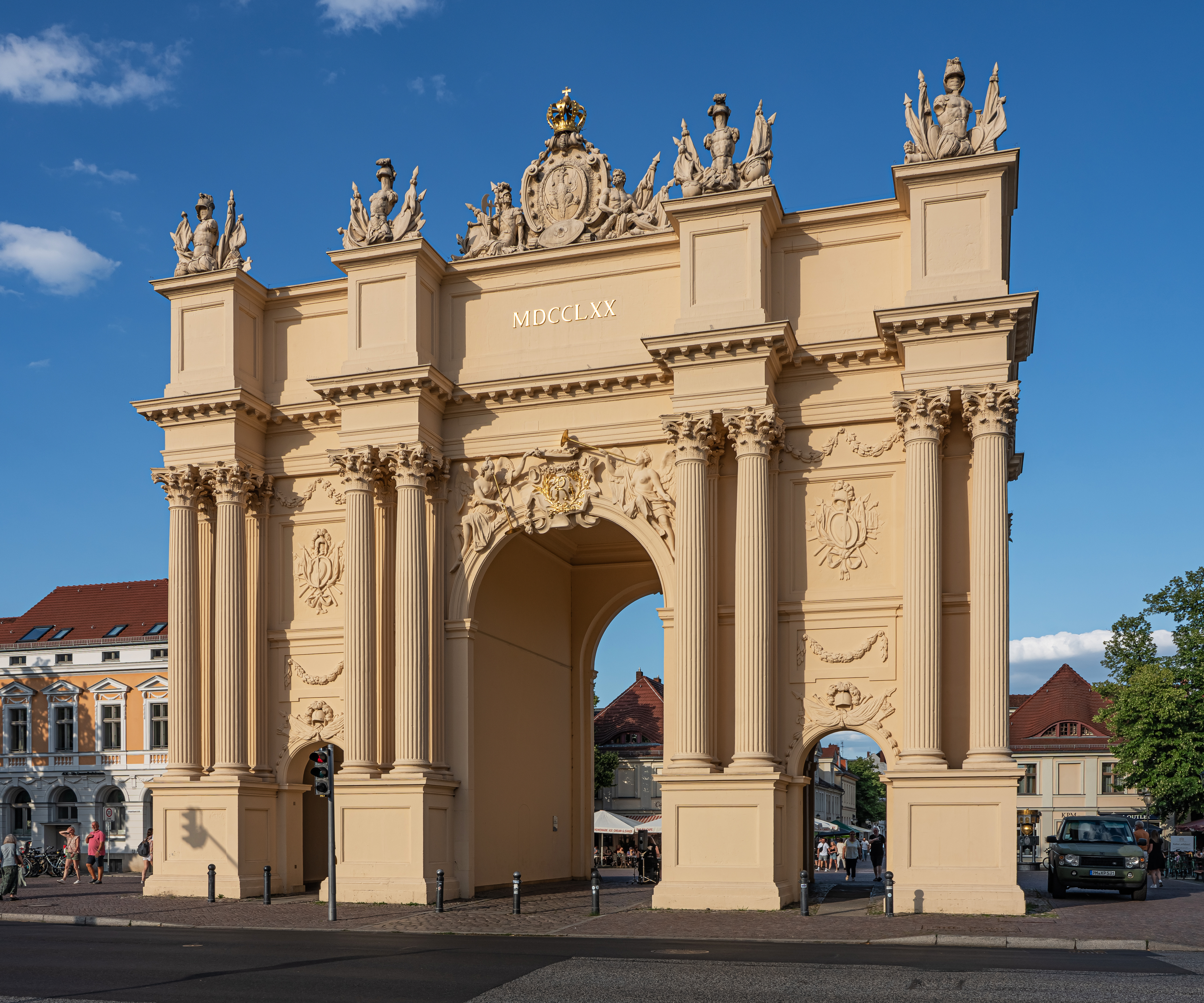
Brandenburg Gate

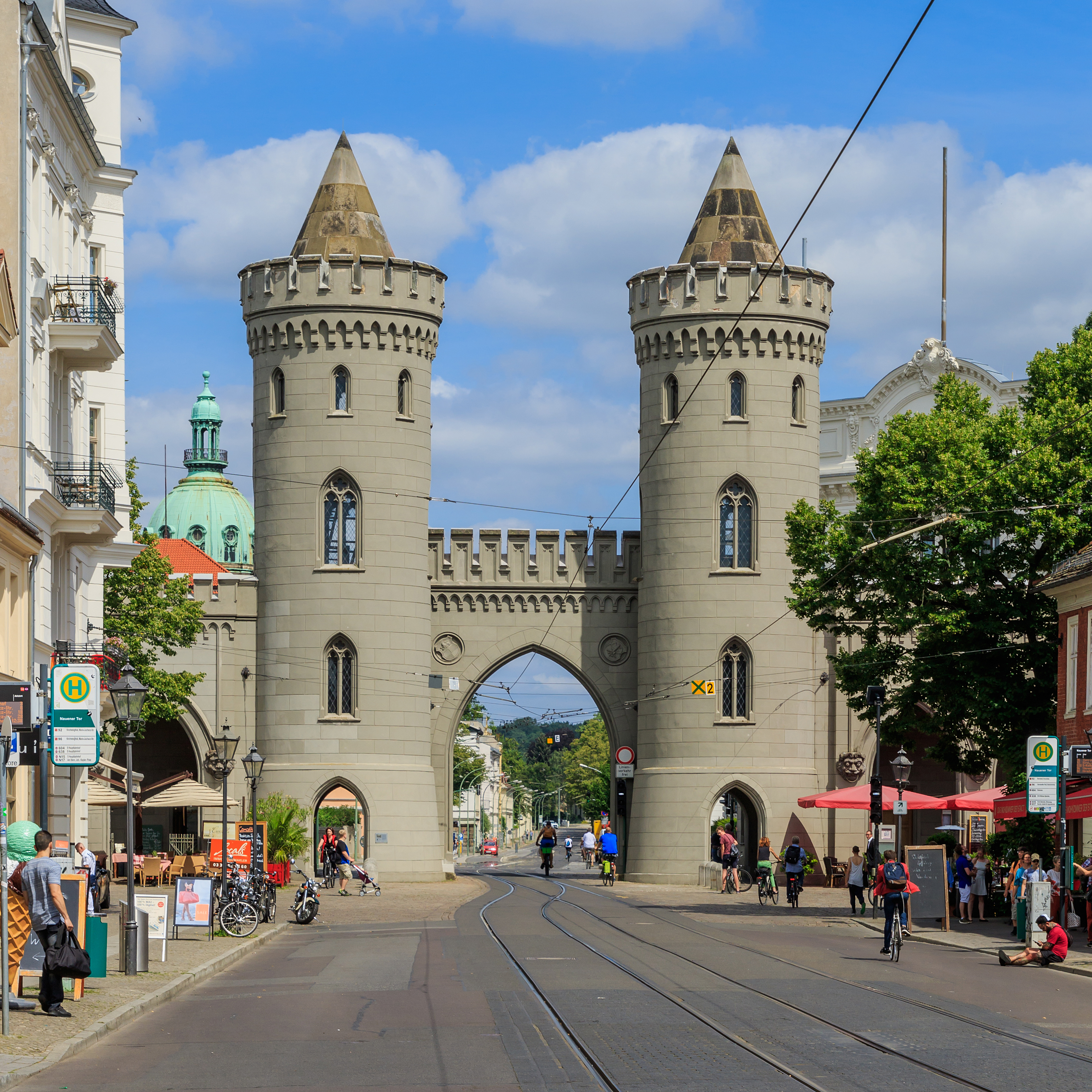
Nauen Gate

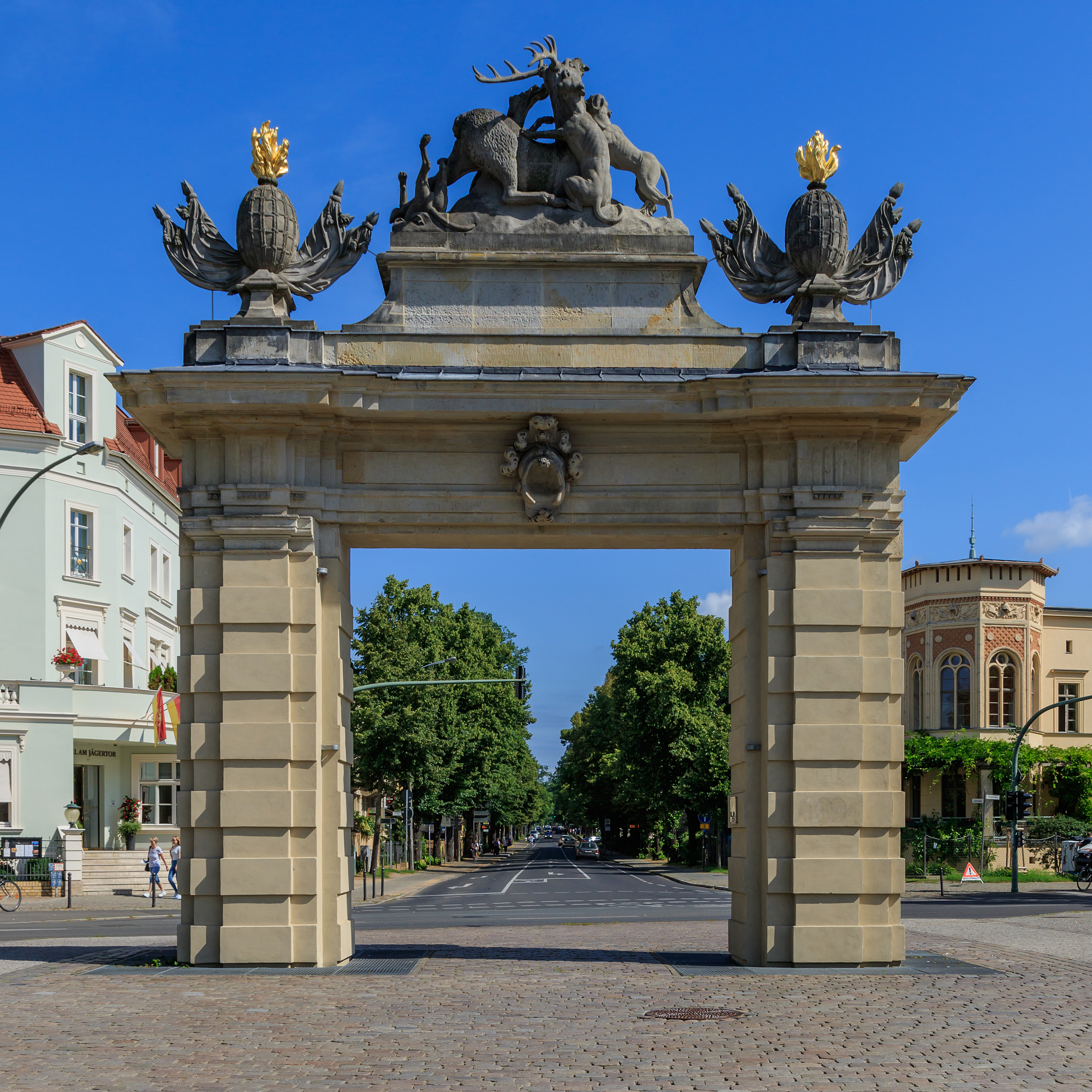
Jägertor ("Hunters' Gate")

== City quarters and ensembles ==
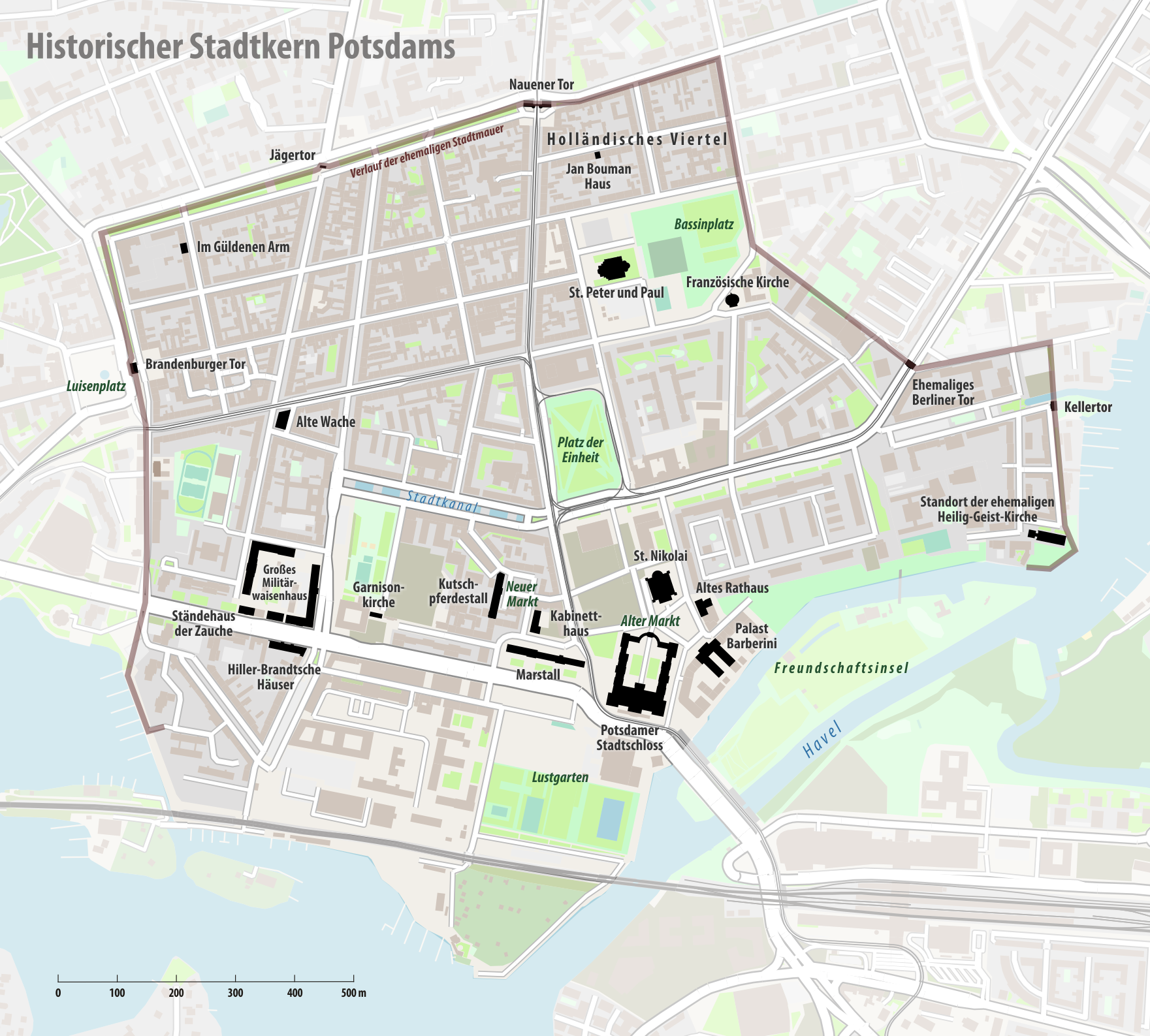
The historical centre of Potsdam

=== City quarters ===
- Dutch Quarter (1733 to 1740)
- Russian Colony of Alexandrowka (1826/1827) with its Alexander Nevsky Memorial Church (foundation stone laid 1826, consecration 1829)
- Potsdam-Babelsberg (around 1900) and the villa colony of Neubabelsberg as well as the Bohemian Weavers' Quarter (Weberviertel)
- Brandenburger Straße is the shopping street of Potsdam in the city centre, and is a pedestrian zone, bordered by St. Peter and St. Paul's Church and the Brandenburger Tor.)
- Berliner Vorstadt (from the second half of the 19th century)
- Potsdam West
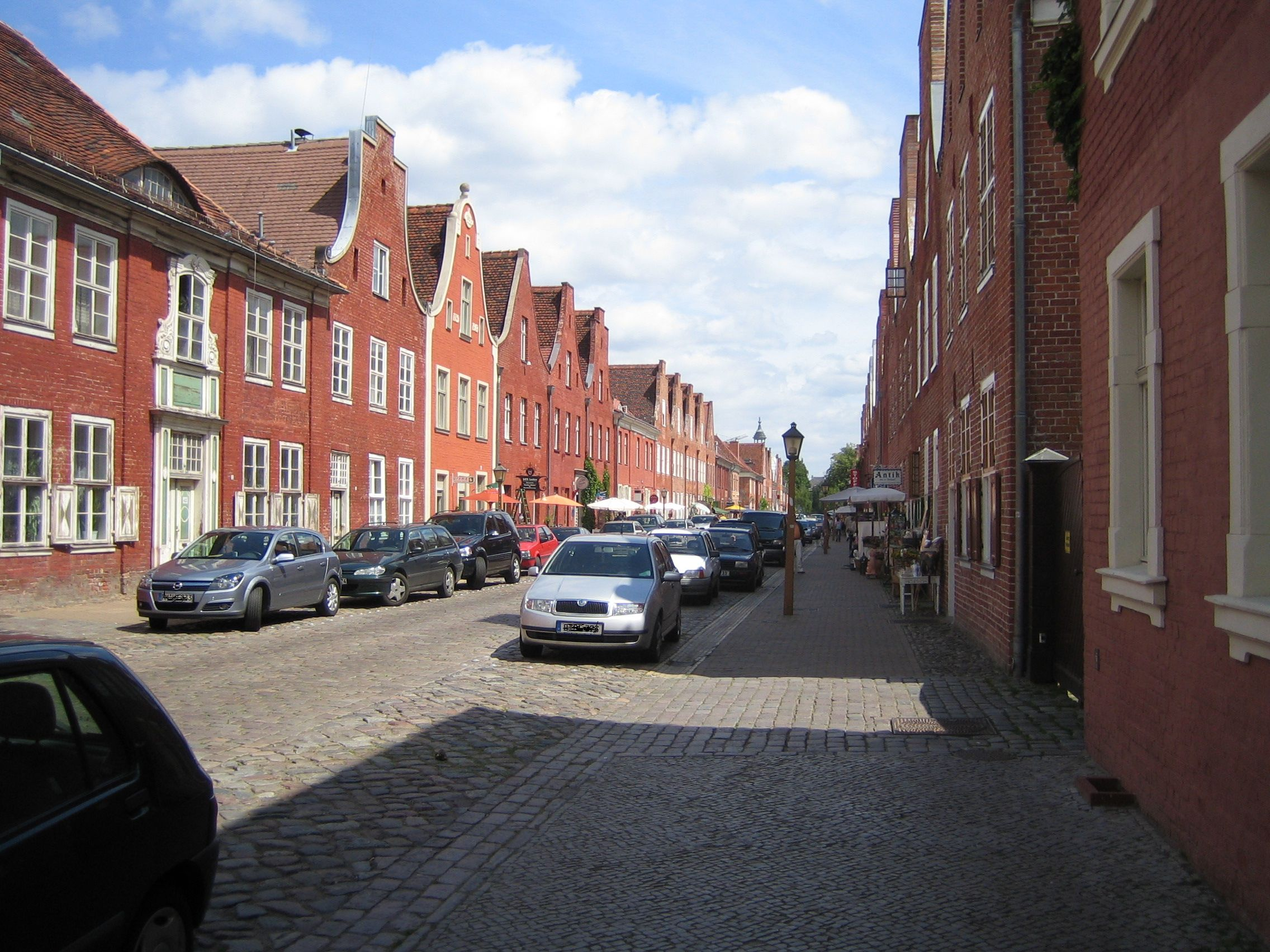
Dutch Quarter

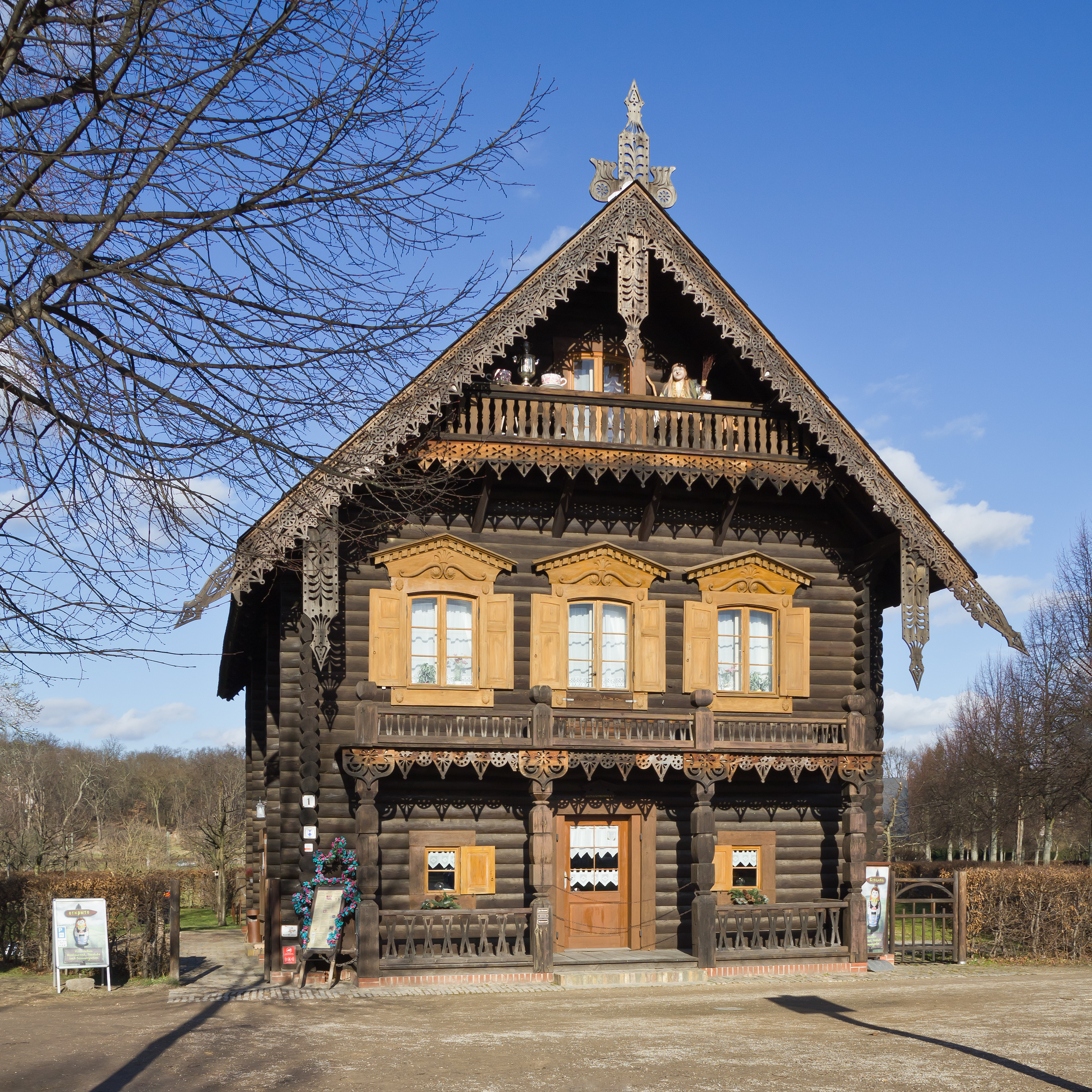
Russian Colony of Alexandrowka

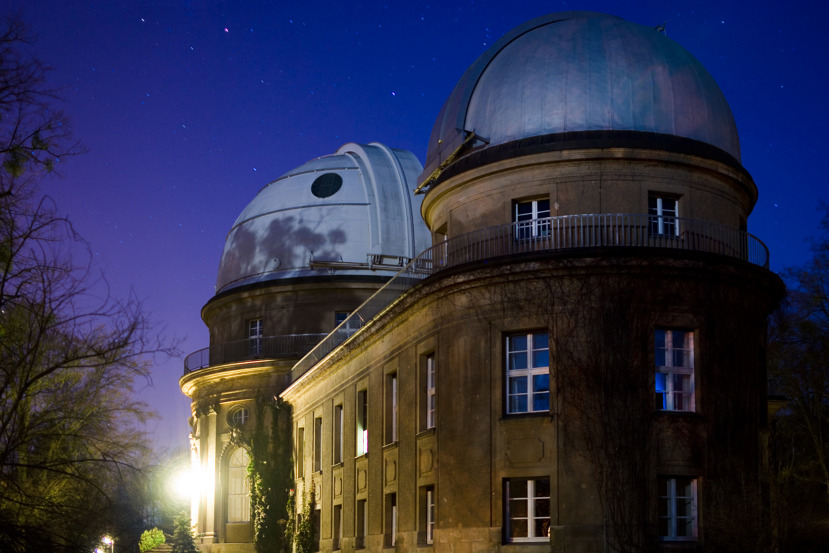
Sternwarte Babelsberg

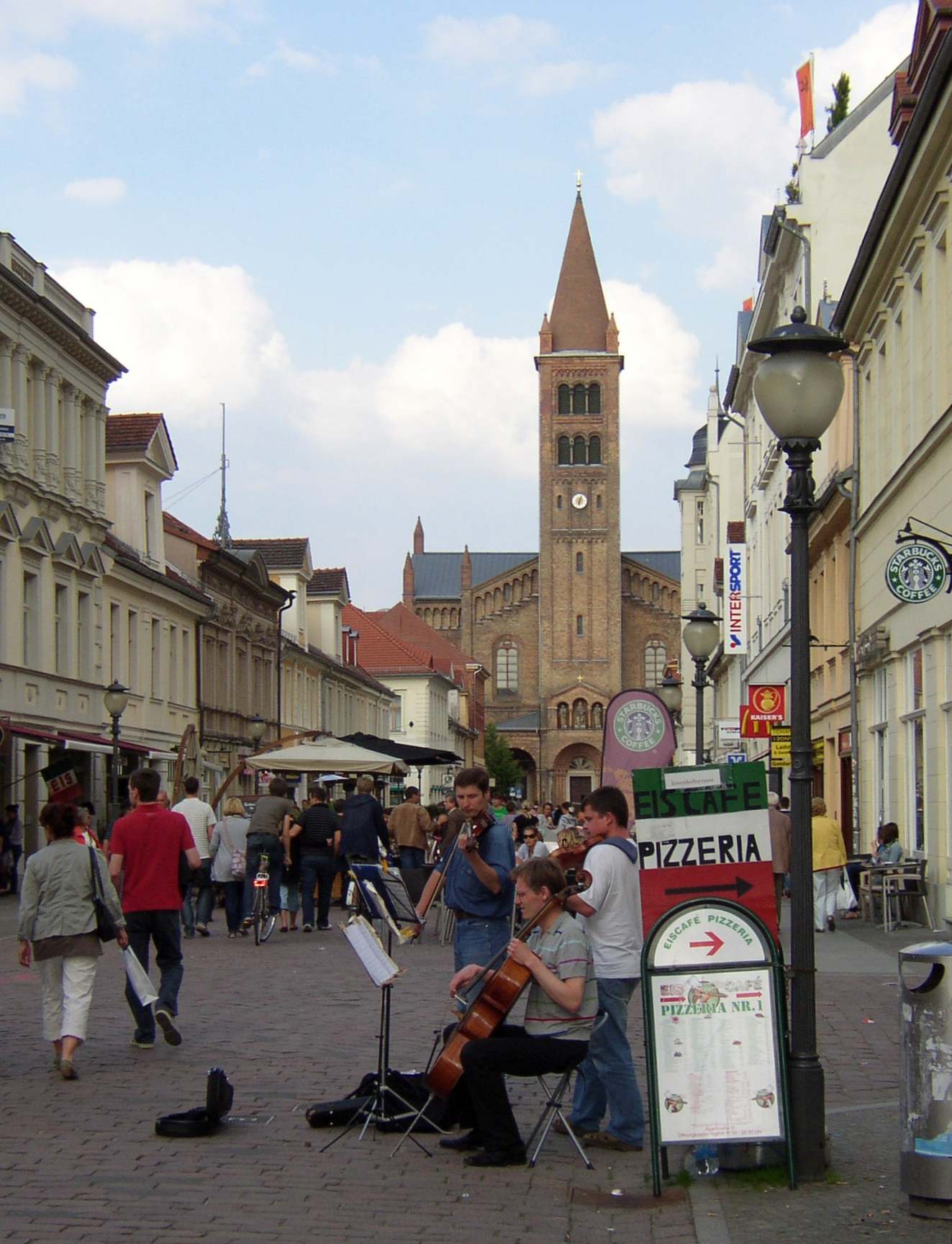
Brandenburger Straße

=== Open spaces and squares ===
- Alter Markt, historic centre of the city.
  - Potsdam City Palace (Stadtschloss), (1662 to 1669, 1744 to 1752; was damaged in 1945, its rebuilding as the state parliament (Landtag) should be finished in 2012)
  - Fortuna Portal, (1701 to 1740) rebuilt 2001/02.
  - Old City Hall (Altes Rathaus), built in the baroque style in 1753 to a design by Andrea Palladio for the Palazzo Angarano in Vicenza that was never executed.
- Neuer Markt, almost entirely preserved baroque square.
- Luisenplatz, (ab 1733), baroque square between Brandenburger Straße and the entrance to Sanssouci Park.
- Bassinplatz with St. Peter and St. Paul's and the French Church.
- Platz der Einheit, central square with modern and historic architecture.
- Glienicke Bridge, (end of the 17th century), well known for the exchange of agents during the Cold War.
- Potsdam Airship Station (Luftschiffhafen Potsdam)
- Babelsberg Film Studio and Babelsberg Film Park
- The new cultural quarter of Schiffbauergasse with the Hans Otto Theatre and the Schinkelhalle.
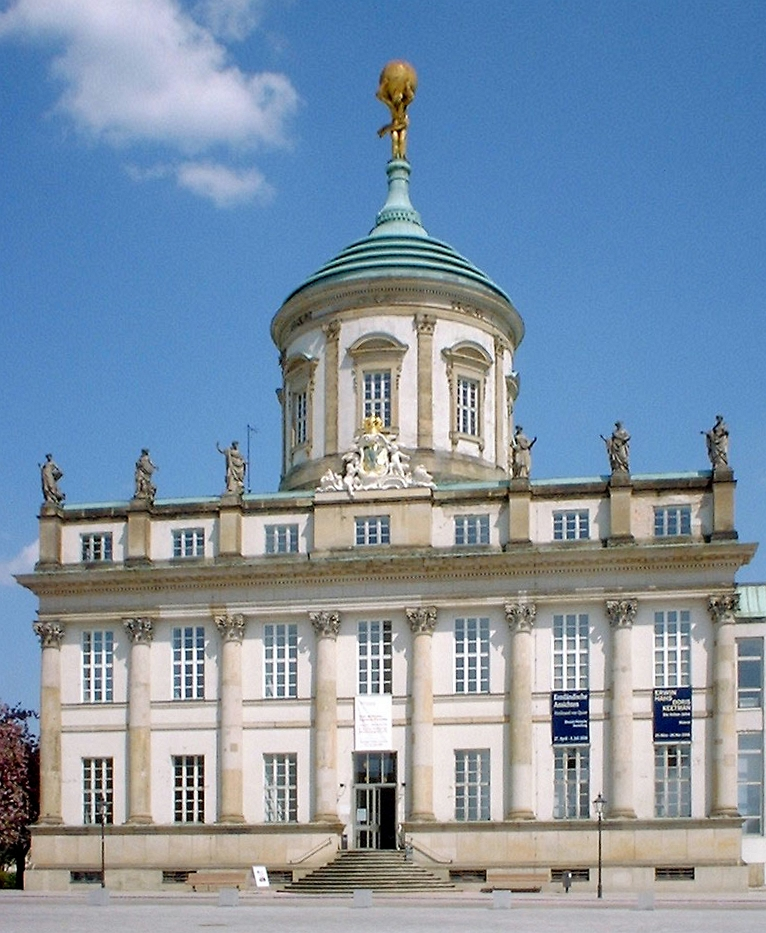
Old City Hall on the Alter Markt (old market square)

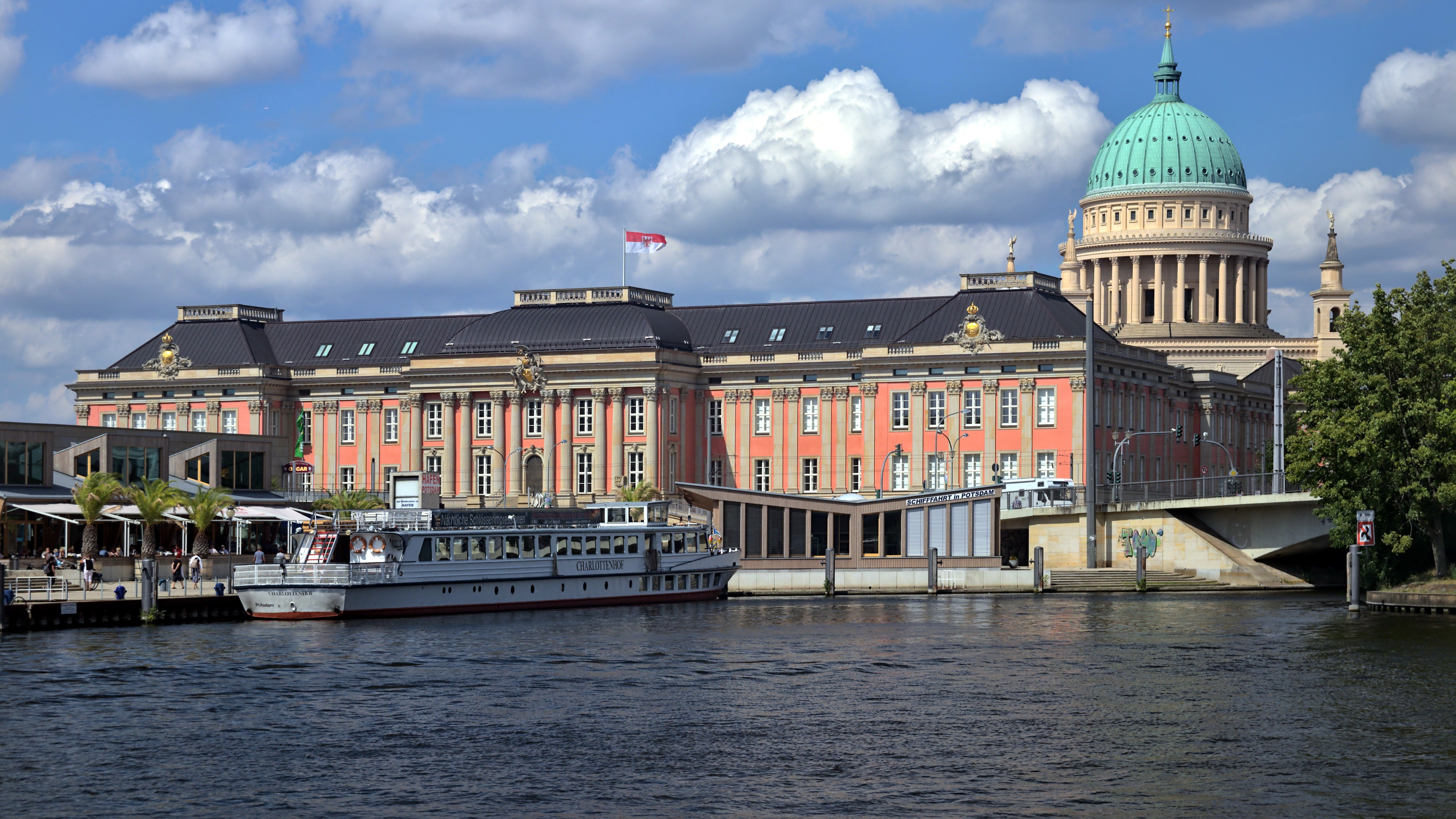
Potsdam City Palace (Stadtschloss)

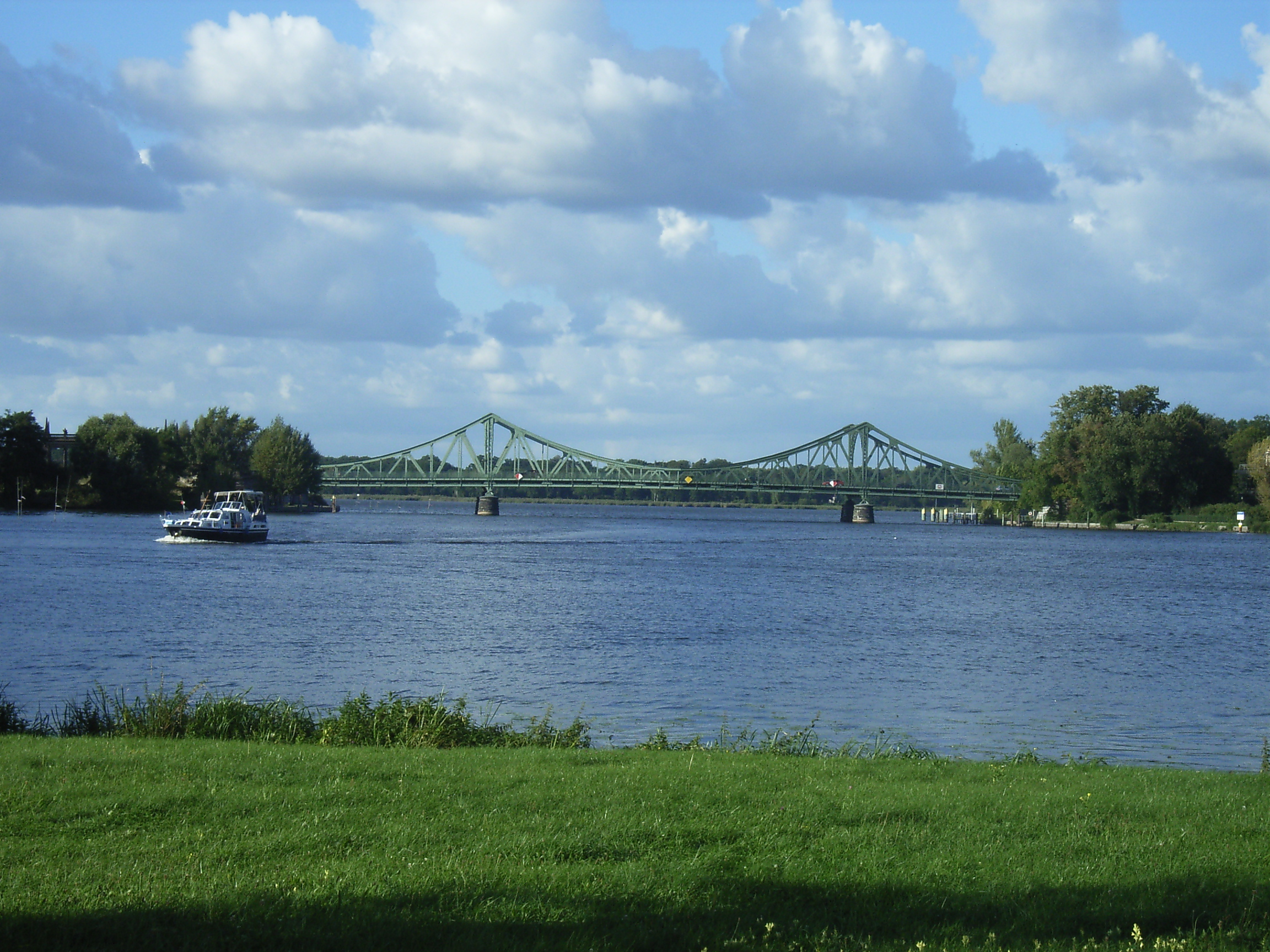
Glienicke Bridge

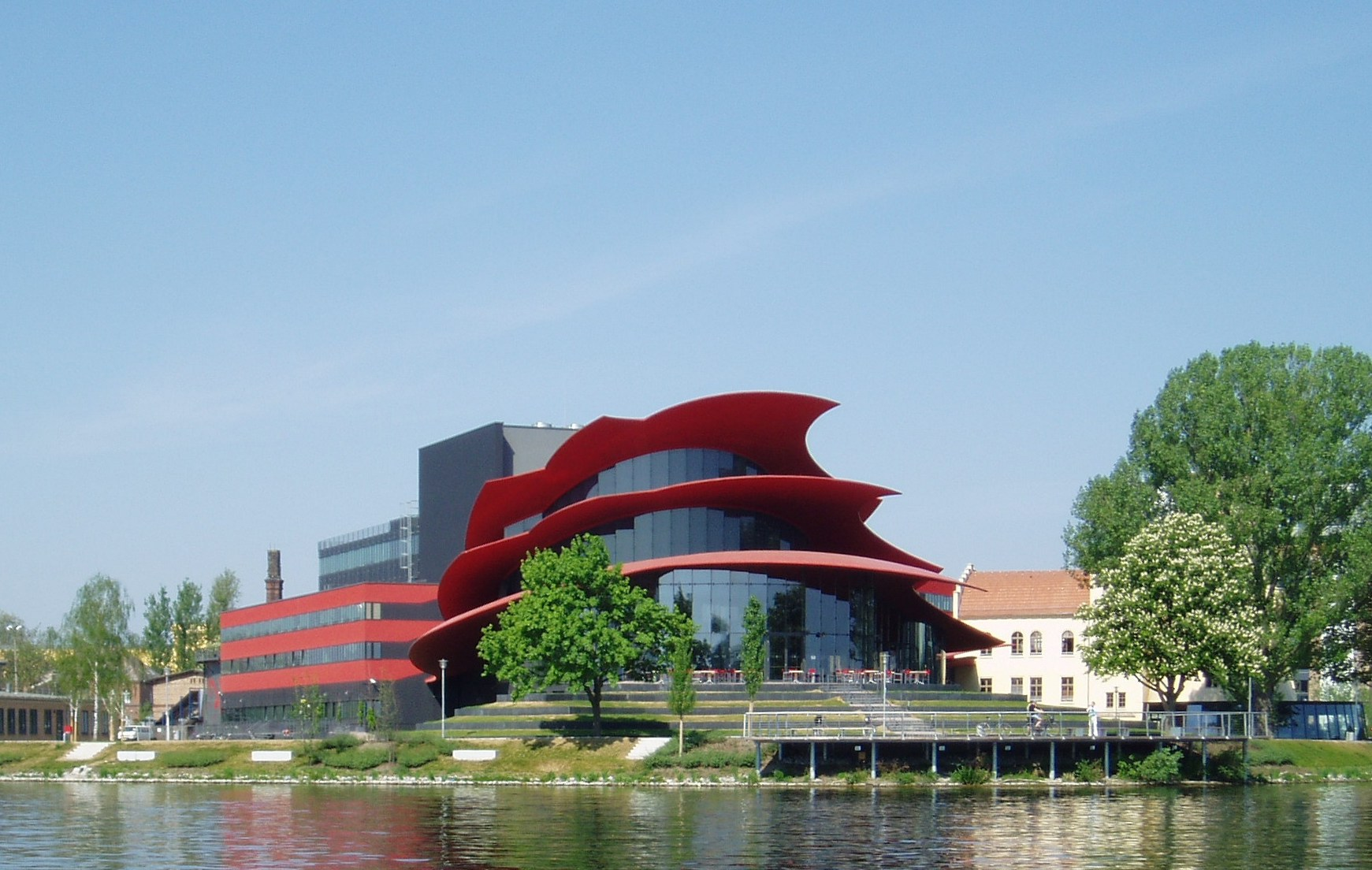
Hans Otto Theatre

=== Buildings ===
- Jan Bouman House (1735) in the Dutch Quarter
- The Hiller & Brandt Houses (1769) located at Breite Strasse 8–12
- The former Great Military Orphanage (Großes Militärwaisenhaus) (1771)
- Pomona Temple (around 1800), the first work by Karl Friedrich Schinkel
- The steam-powered Pump House (1841–43) for the fountains of Sanssouci Park, designed by Ludwig Persius in the shape of a mosque on the bank of the Havel River
- Belvedere on the Pfingstberg (1847 to 1852, 1860 to 1863)
- The former War College (Kriegsschule) (1902) on the Brauhausberg hill
- The Emperor's Station (1905–09) (Kaiserbahnhof), originally the Court Station (Hofstation) in Wildpark, has been used since its recent restoration as a Management Academy (Akademie für Führungskräfte) for the German rail system.
- Karstadt department store with art nouveau facade and atrium (1905, 1928–29)
- Werner Alfred Bathhouse
- Bayrisches Haus
- Einstein Tower (1920 to 1921)
- Glass Sweets Factory owned by the firm Katjes. From the gallery, visitors can view the entire sweets-manufacturing process.
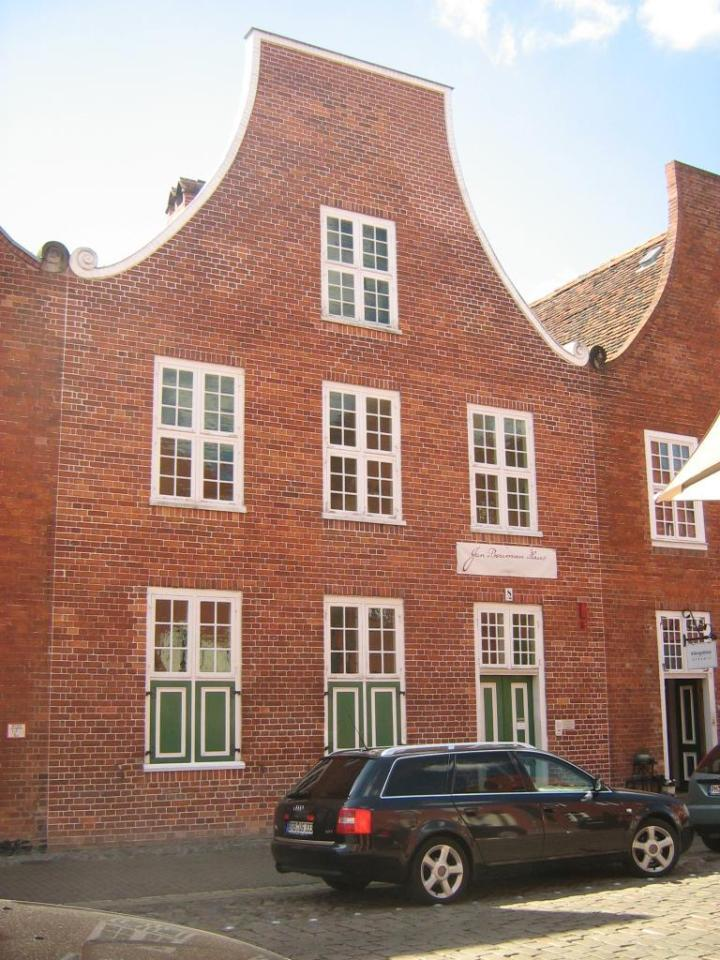
Jan Bouman House

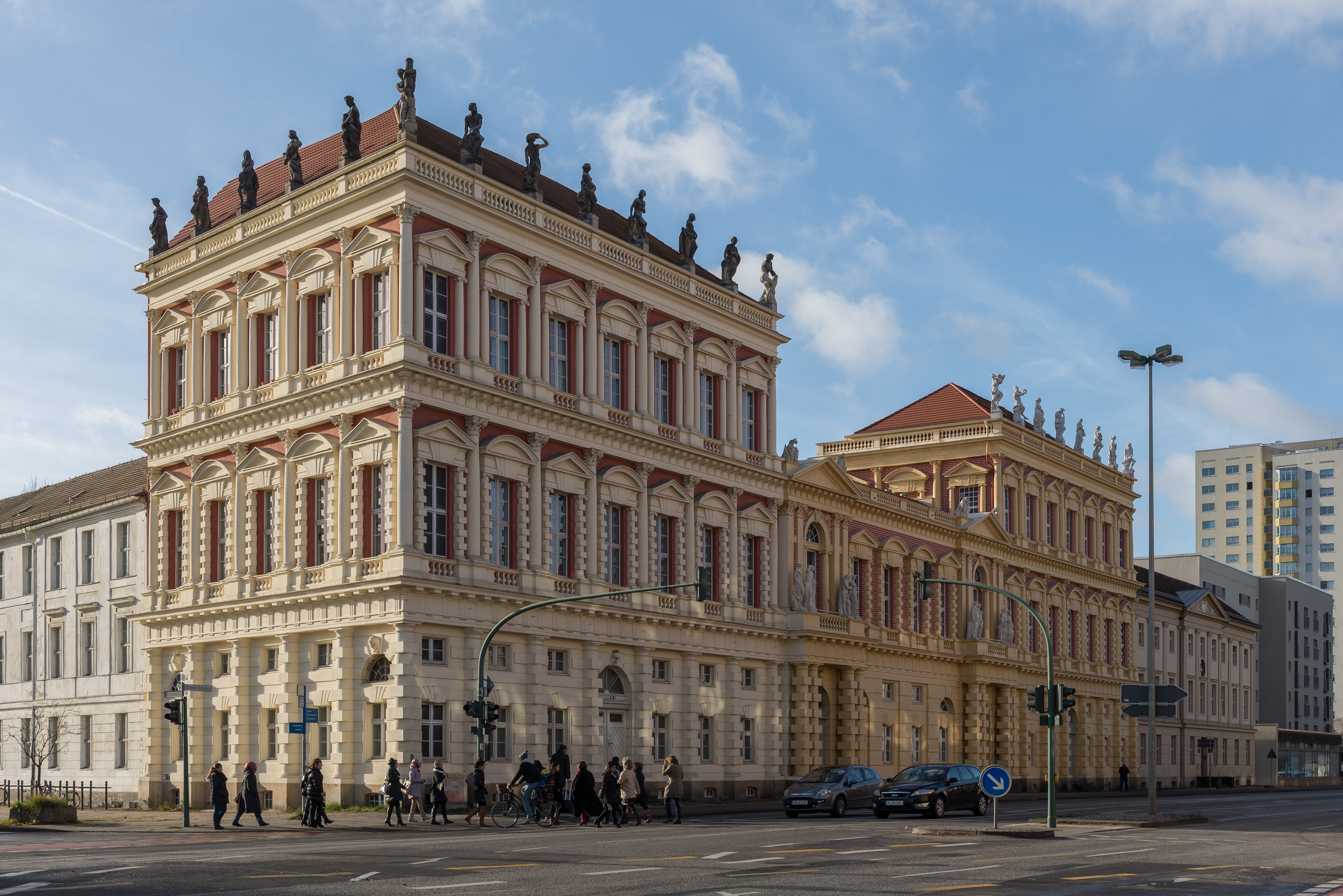
Hiller & Brandt Houses

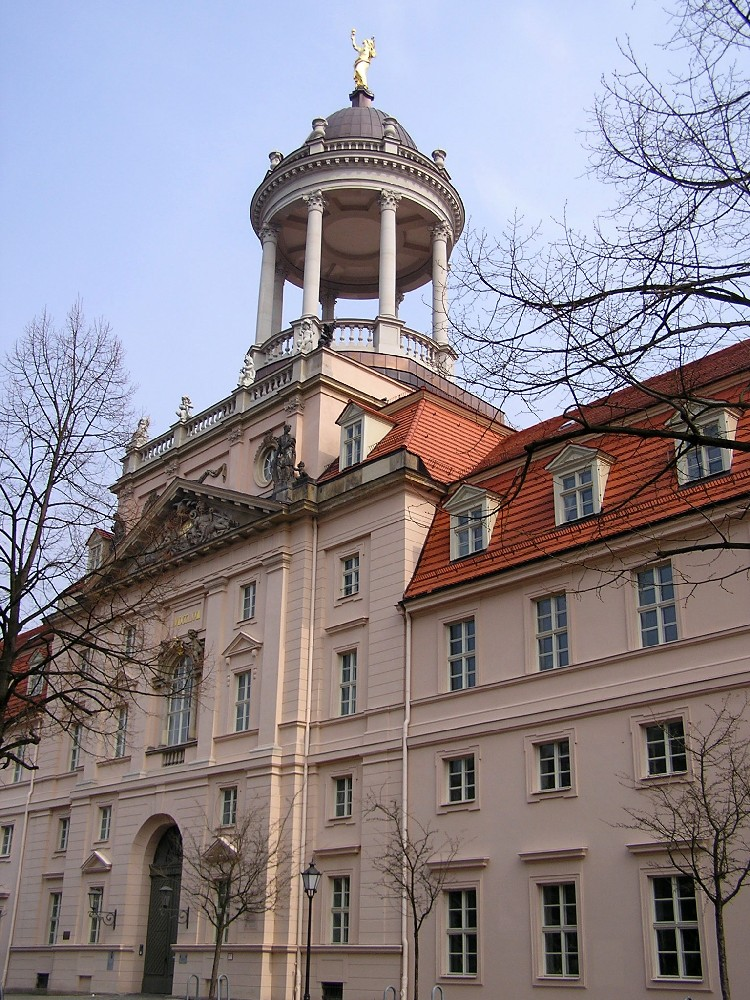
The former Great Military Orphanage

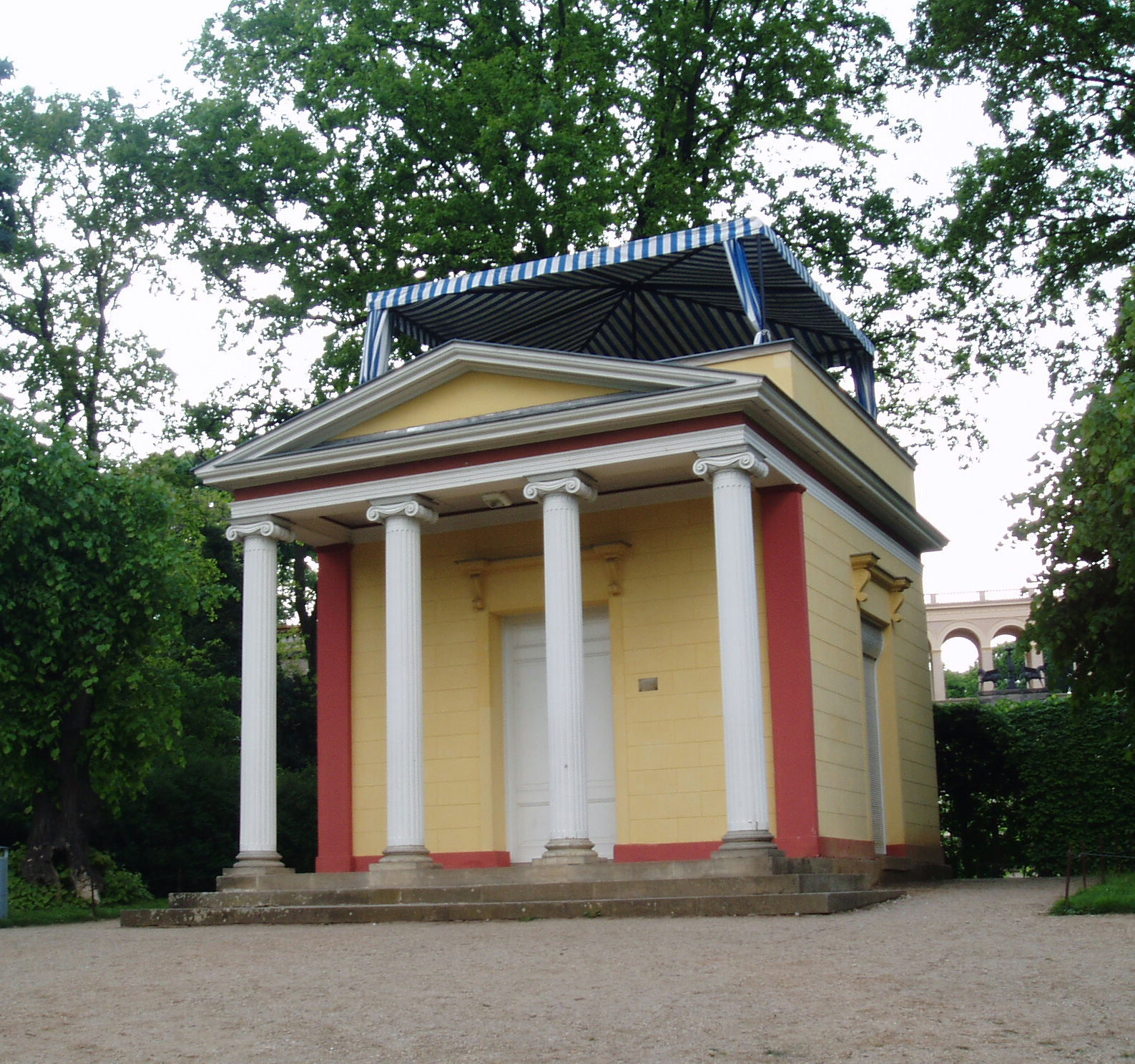
Pomona Temple

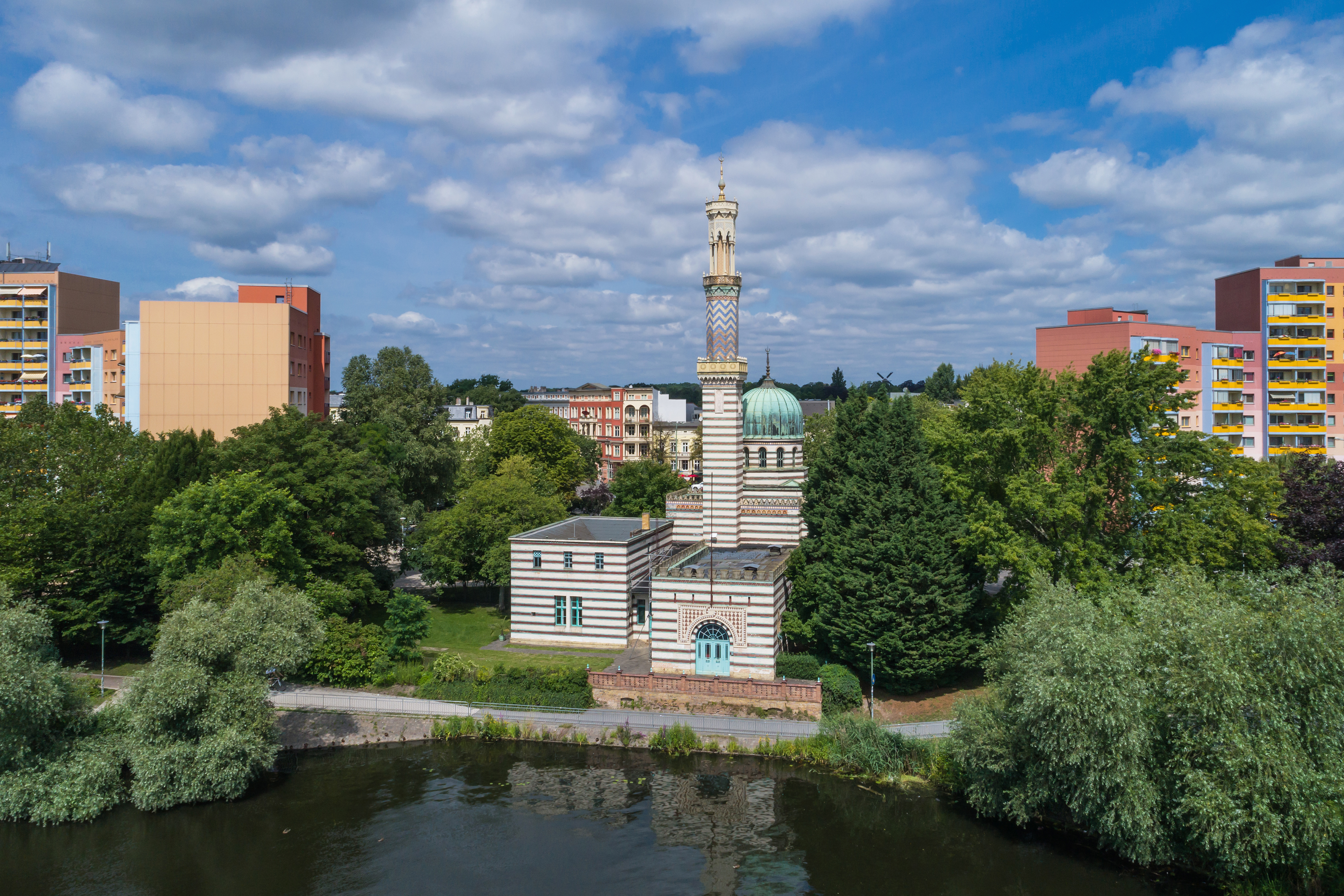
Steam-powered Pump House

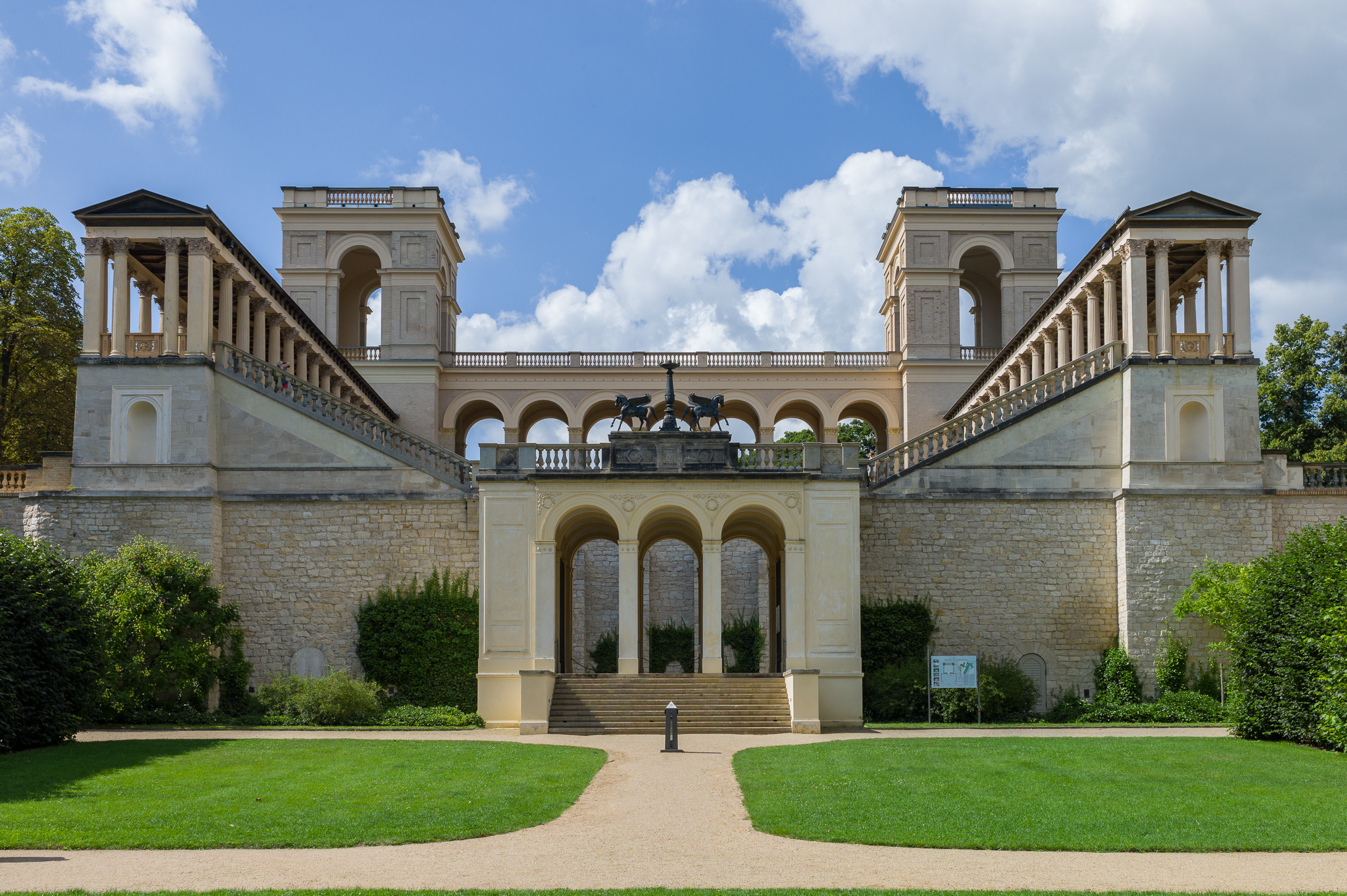
Belvedere on the Pfingstberg

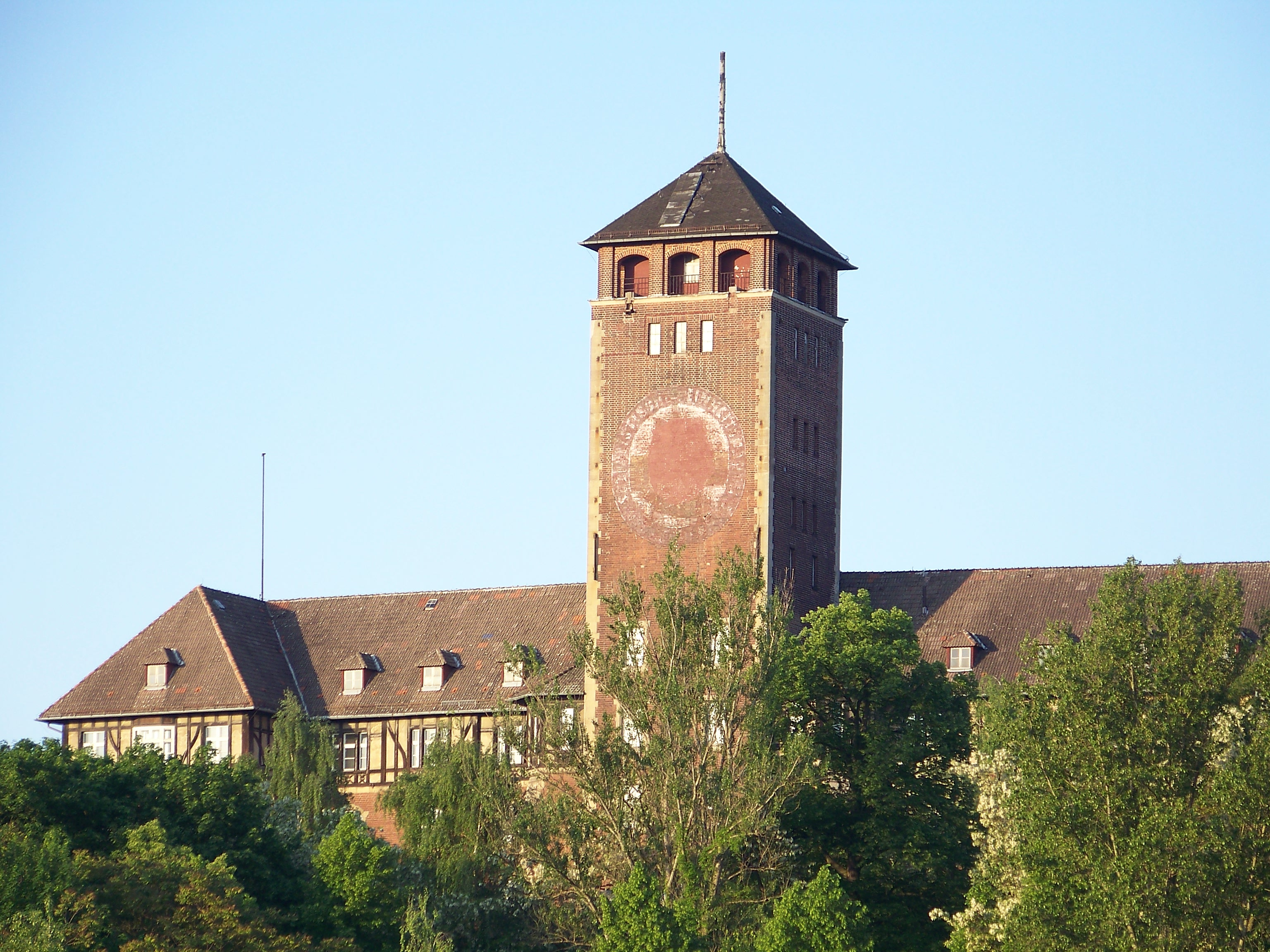
Former War College on the Brauhausberg hill

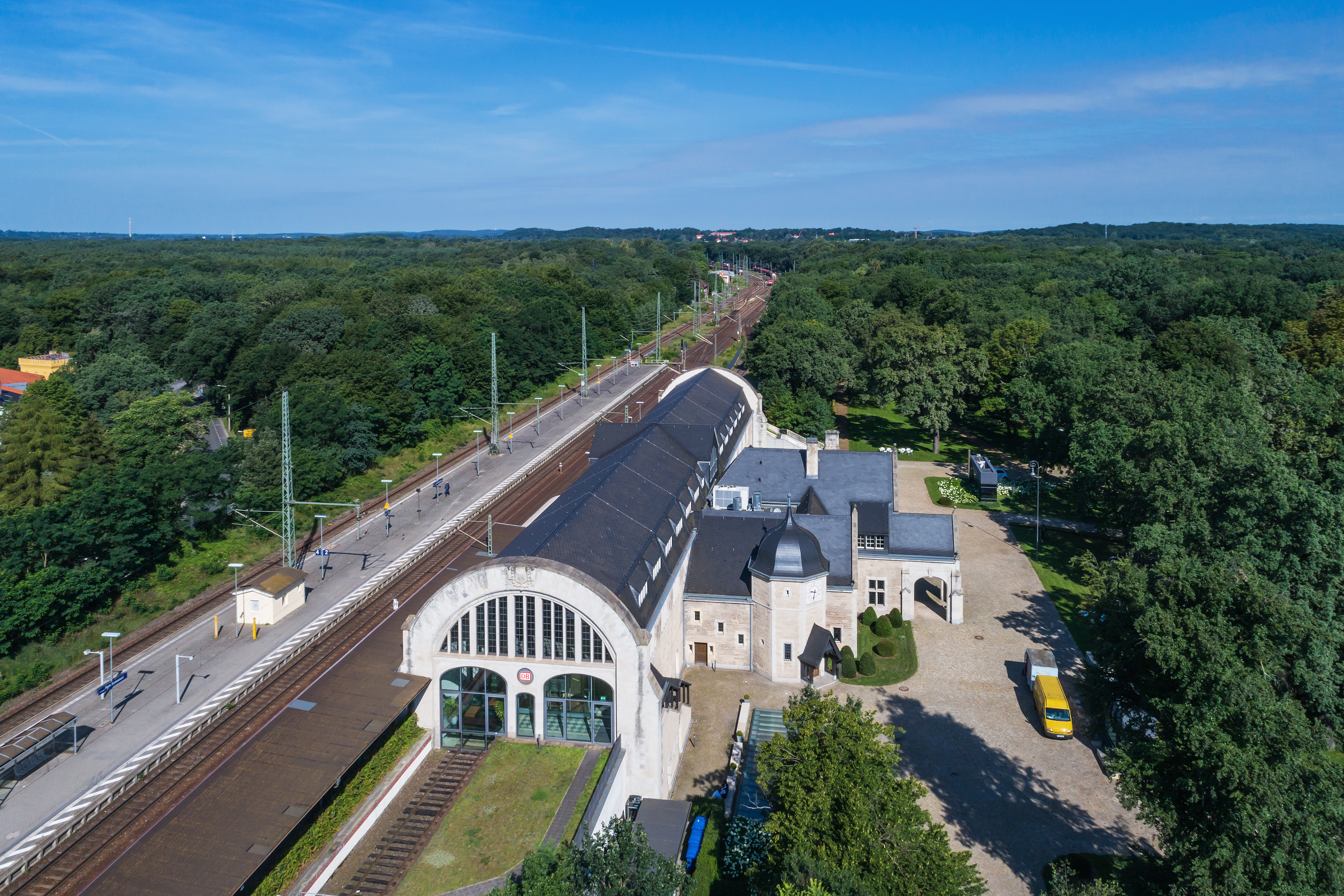
The Emperor's Station

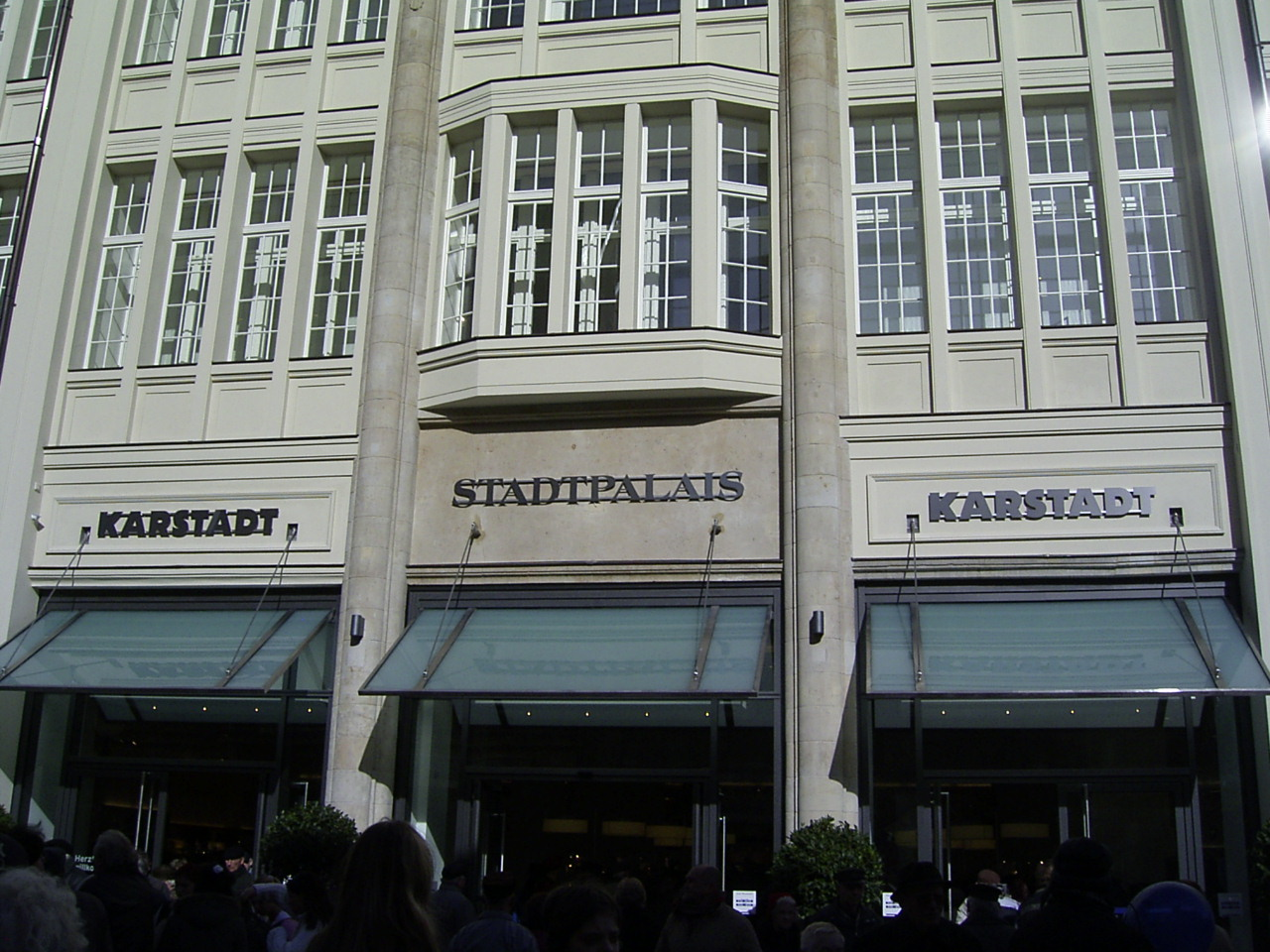
Karstadt department store

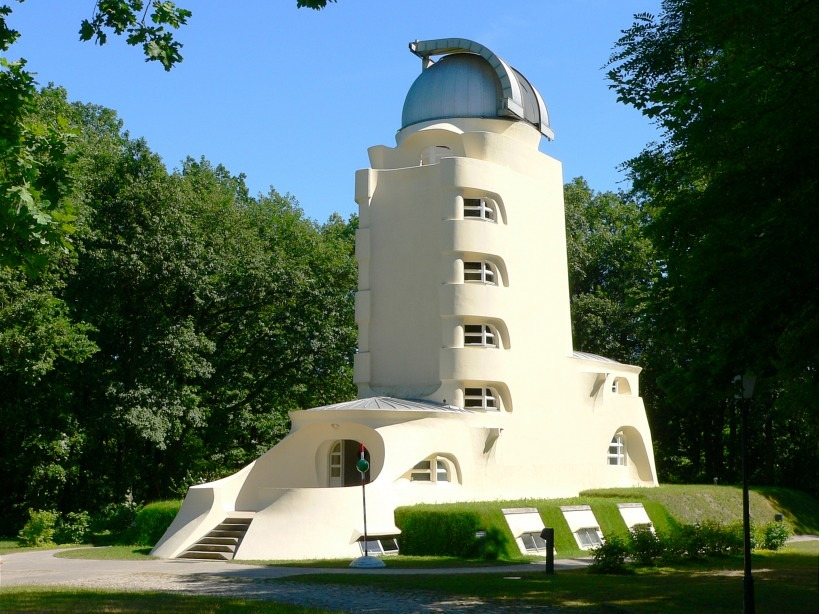
Einstein Tower

== Museums and exhibitions ==
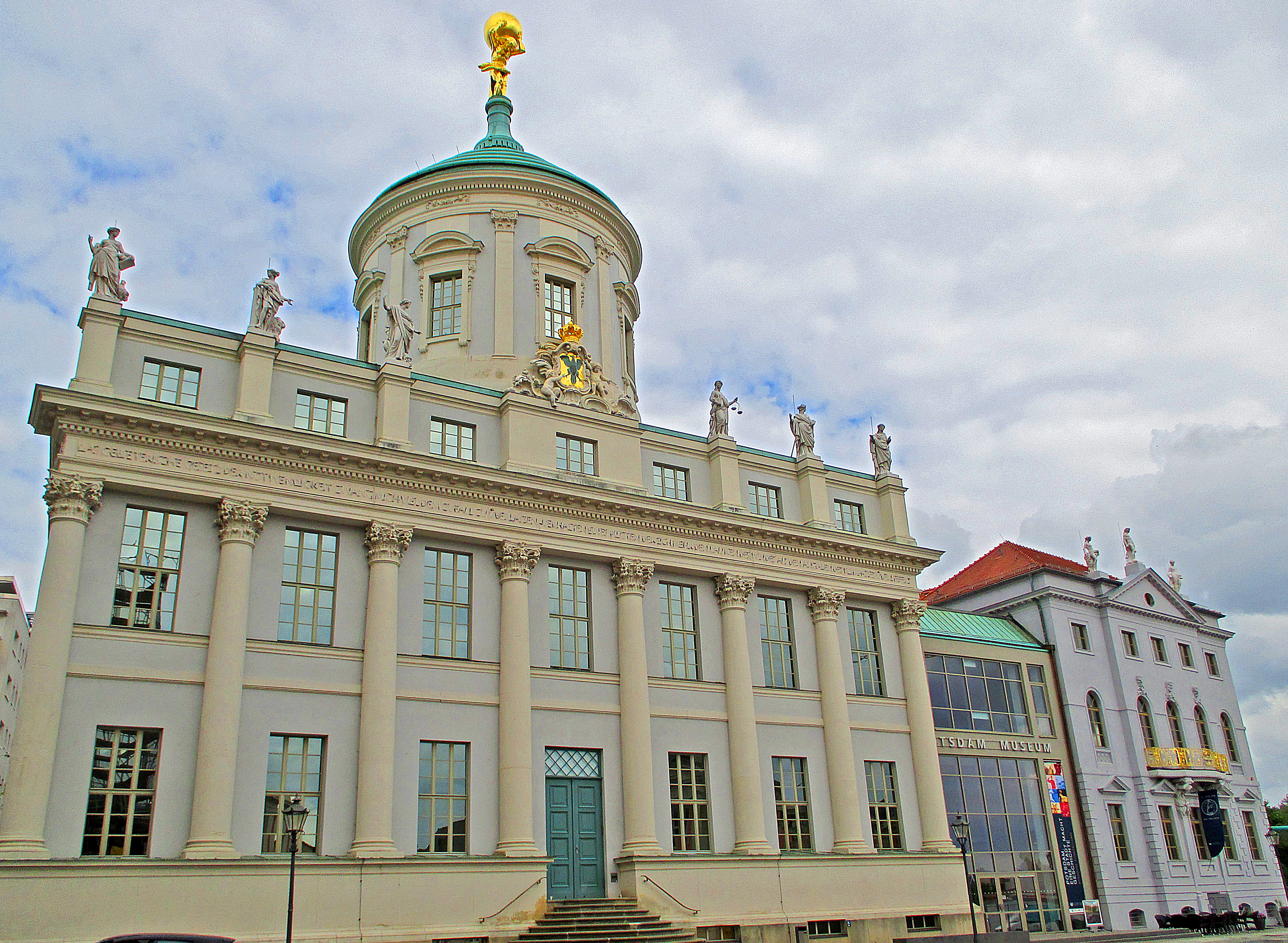
Old Town Hall - home of the Potsdam Museum - Forum for Art and History

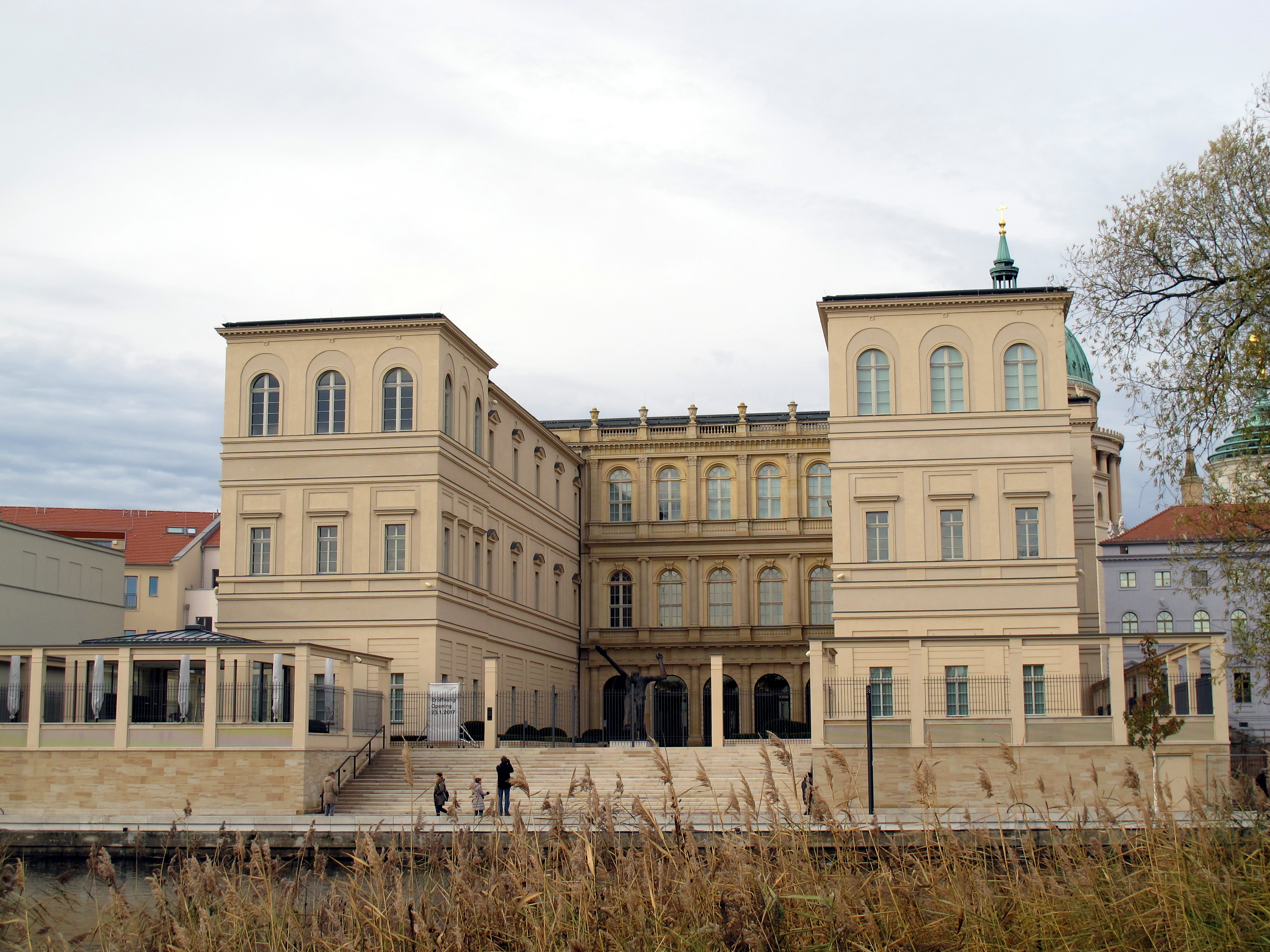
Museum Barberini in November 2016

- Babelsberg Palace
- Belvedere auf dem Klausberg
- Belvedere on the Pfingstberg
- Berlin S-Bahn Museum at Griebnitzsee station
- Cecilienhof
- Charlottenhof Palace
- Einstein Tower
- Extavium Potsdam
- Historic Mill of Sanssouci
- House of Brandenburg-Prussian History at the Neuer Markt
- Jan Bouman House - typical gabled house from 1735 in the Dutch Quarter
- Kommandantenhaus - Memorial Lindenstraße for the victims of political violence in the 20th century
- Marmorpalais
- Memorial Leistikowstraße Potsdam - former KGB prison
- Museum Alexandrowka - Restored 1820s period wooden house in Russian style
- Museum Barberini - Built on the site of Barberini Palace
- Museum FLUXUS+
- Museum ‘Im Güldenen Arm’
- New Chambers
- Nowaweser Weaver's Cottage in the Bohemian Weber Quarter
- Orangery Palace
- Potsdam Film Museum in the historic royal stables, the oldest surviving building in the city
- Potsdam Museum in the Dutch Quarter
- Potsdam Natural History Museum
- Roman Baths
- Sanssouci Palace
- Sanssouci Picture Gallery
- Steam Engine Building in Sanssouci Park - historic pumphouse designed like a mosque
- Villa Schöningen

== Villas ==
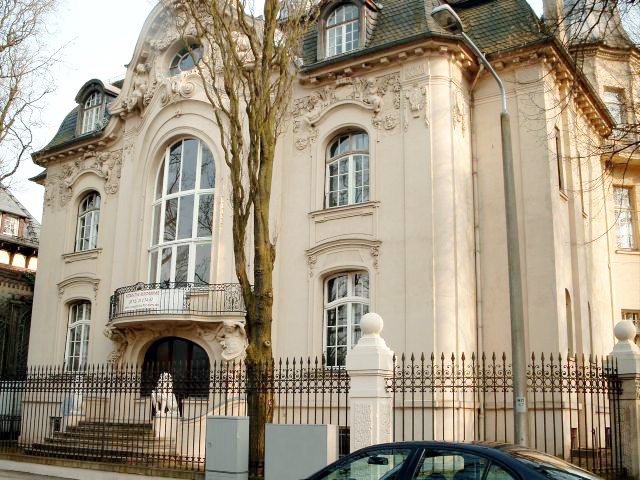
Löwenvilla

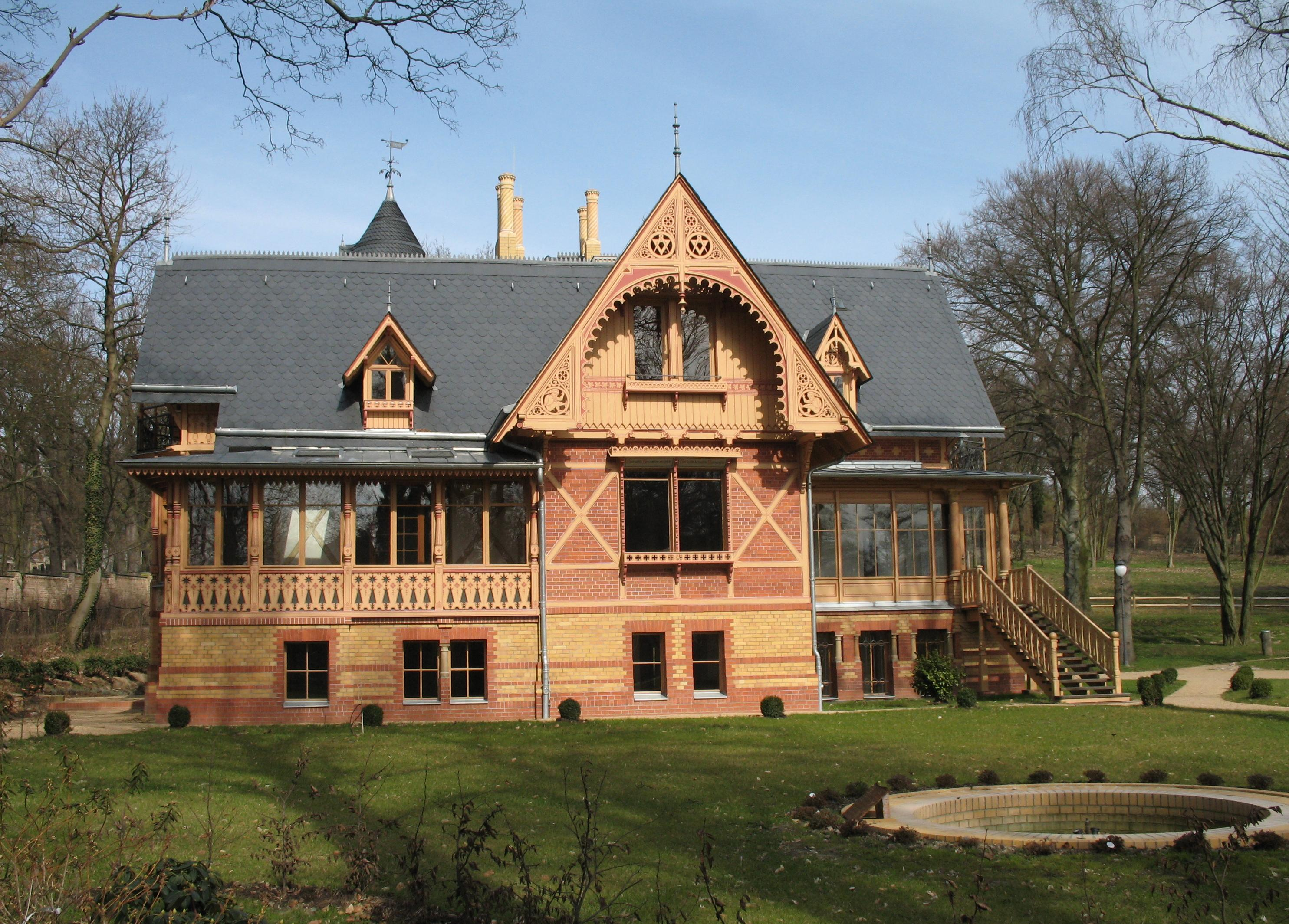
Villa Gericke

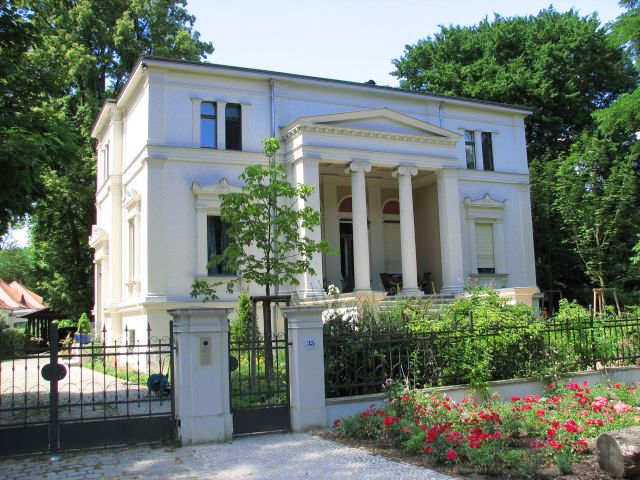
Villa Stülpnagel

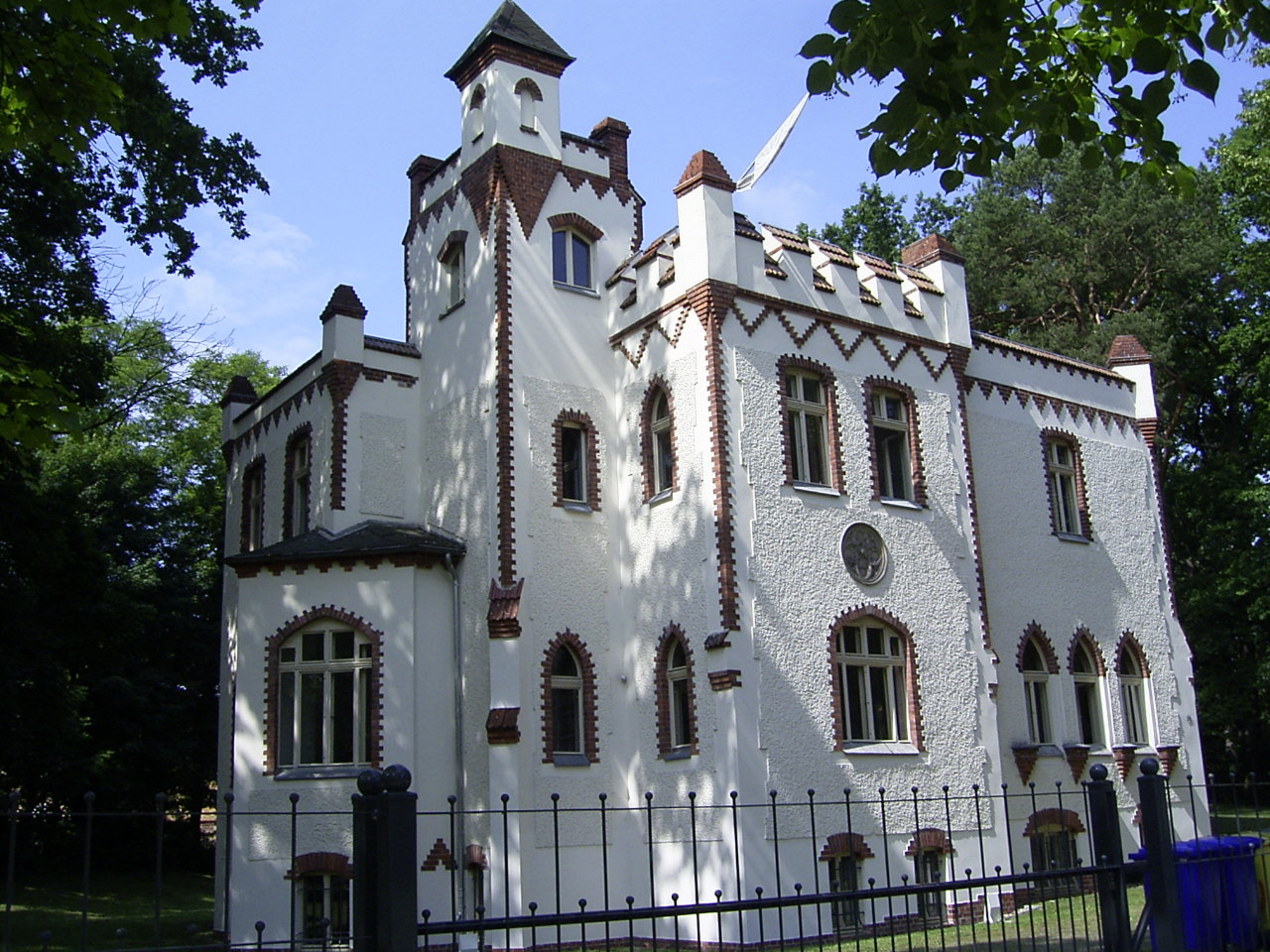
Villa Lademann

Since the 1990s many architecturally interesting villas have been restored:

- Neubabelsberg villa colony
- Villa Ingenheim
- Villa Liegnitz
- Villa von Diringshofen
- Villa Kampffmeyer by the Glienicke Bridge
- Villa Schöningen by the Glienicke Bridge
- Villa Heydert
- Villa Rohn also called the Löwenwilla, named after the lions (Löwen) in front of the facade. Owned since 1941 by the Fritz von der Lancken family, a resistance fighter against the Third Reich.
- Herbertshof, named after Herbert Gutmann, with its Arabic Room (Zimmer Arabicum)
- Palace of Countess Lichtenau, on the Heiliger See
- Villa Bach, Spitzweggasse
- Villa Ernst von Bergmann, Berliner Straße
- Villa Gericke, Puschkinallee
- Villa Gutmann (only a small part has been renovated)
- Villa Kellermann
- Villa Kutscherhaus, Persiusstr.
- Villa General Ladental
- Villa Mendelson, named after the Jewish merchant
- Villa Mosler
- Villa Fritz Rumpf
- Villa Sarna with its lion frieze
- Villa Spillner, Böcklinstraße/Tizianstraße
- Villa Starke (Potsdam-Babelsberg)
- Villa Stülpnagel, Hegelallee 5, with impressive frame and panel door (Kassettentür); large historic map of Berlin in Russian script in the fireplace room.
- Villa Wiener, Konrad Adenauer lived here in 1934
- Villa Lademann, Heinz Rühmann lived here during filming, the house was built by the brother of Otto Lilienthal, Gustav Lilienthal
- Villa Alfred Zeisler, by Marika Röckk

== Lakes ==
- Griebnitzsee
- Großer and Kleiner Zernsee
- Heiliger See
- Jungfernsee
- Lehnitzsee
- Teufelssee
- Templiner See
- Tiefer See
- Weißer See
- Potsdam City Canal, rebuilt in 1999
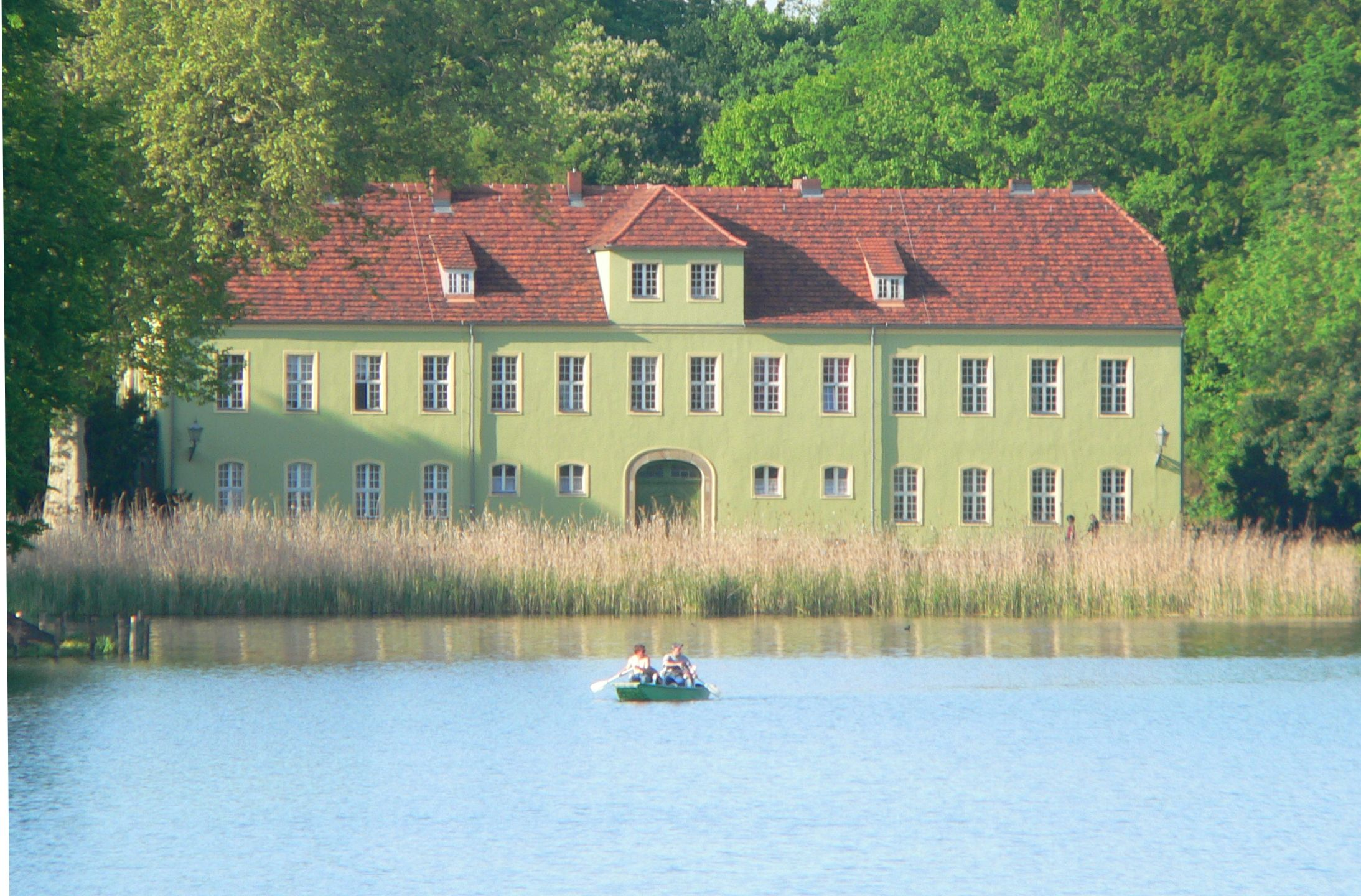
The Green House (Grünes Haus) in the New Garden on the Heiliger See

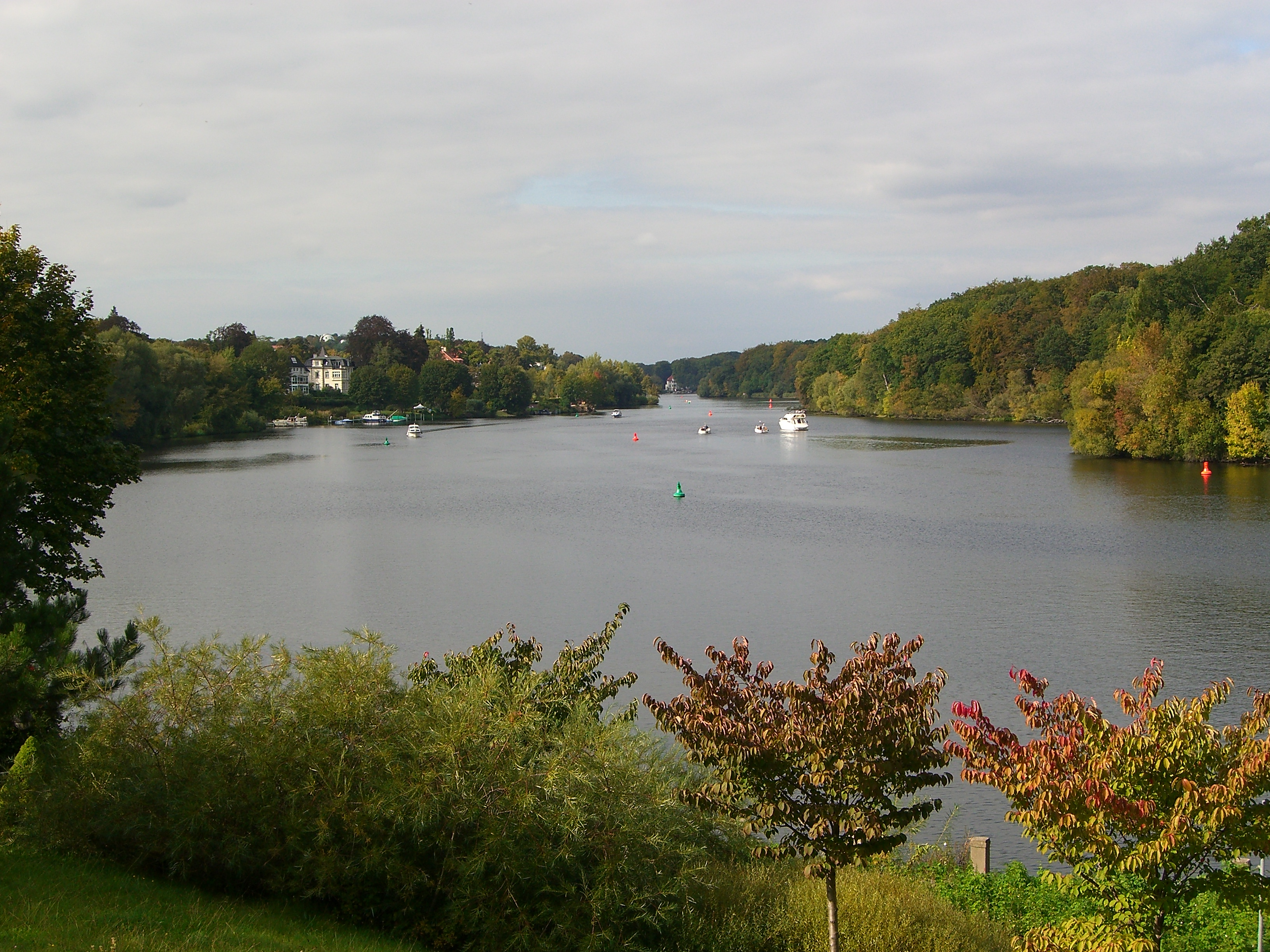
Griebnitzsee

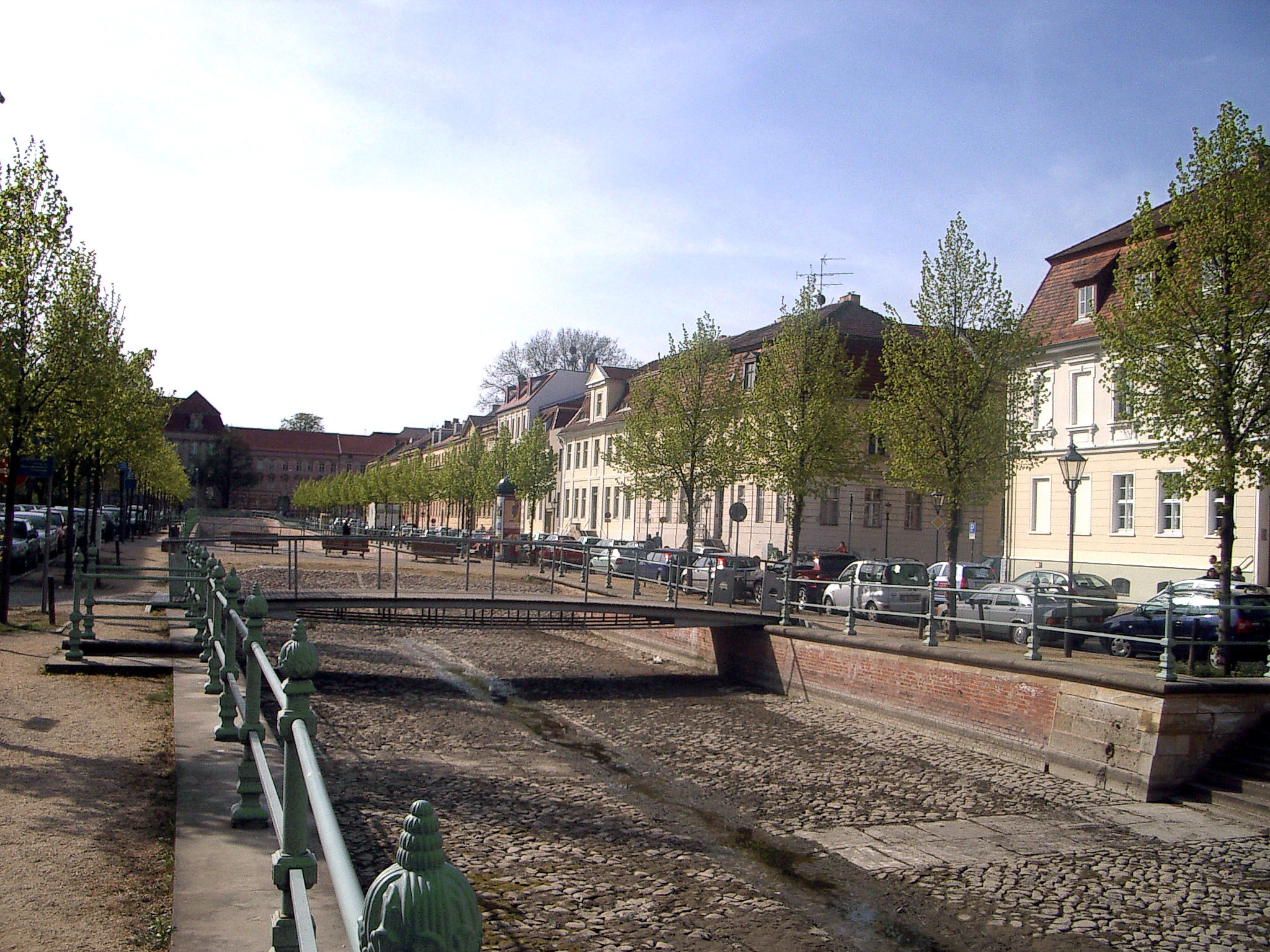
Potsdam City Canal
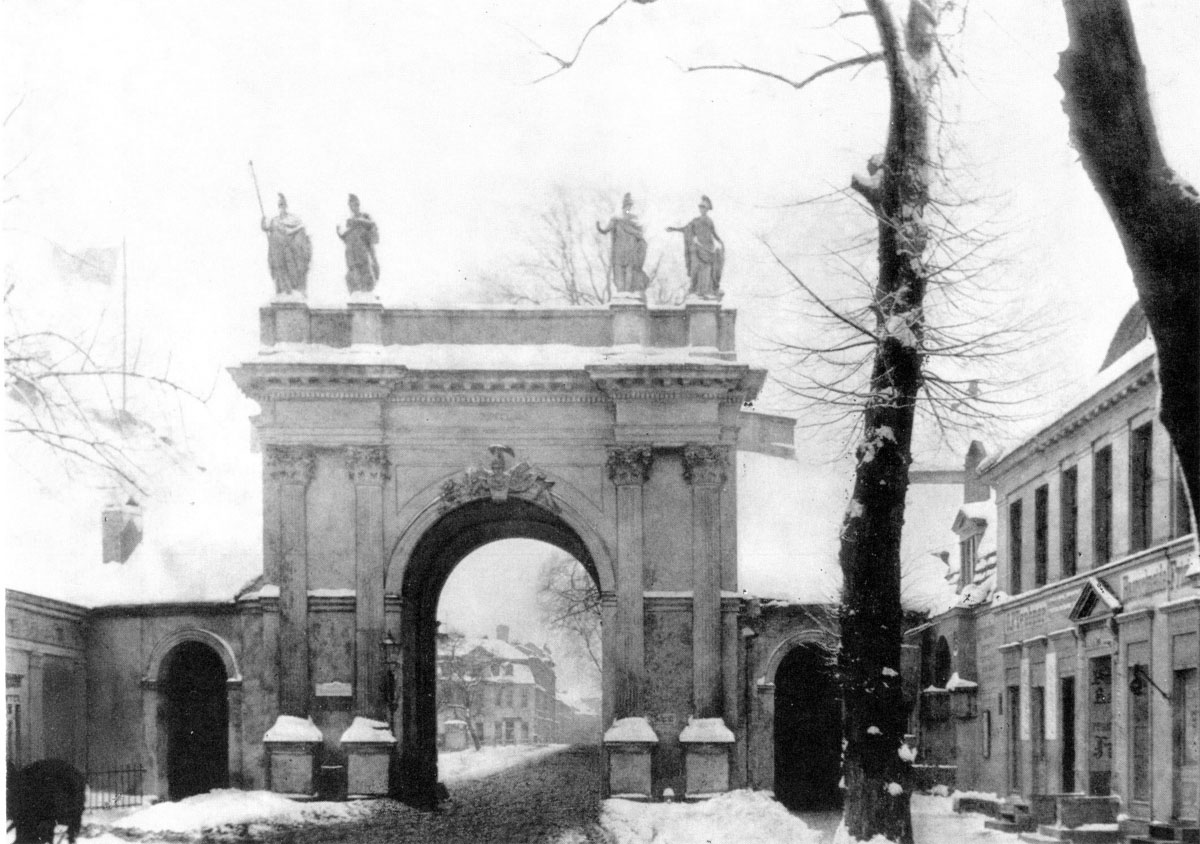
The Berlin Gate

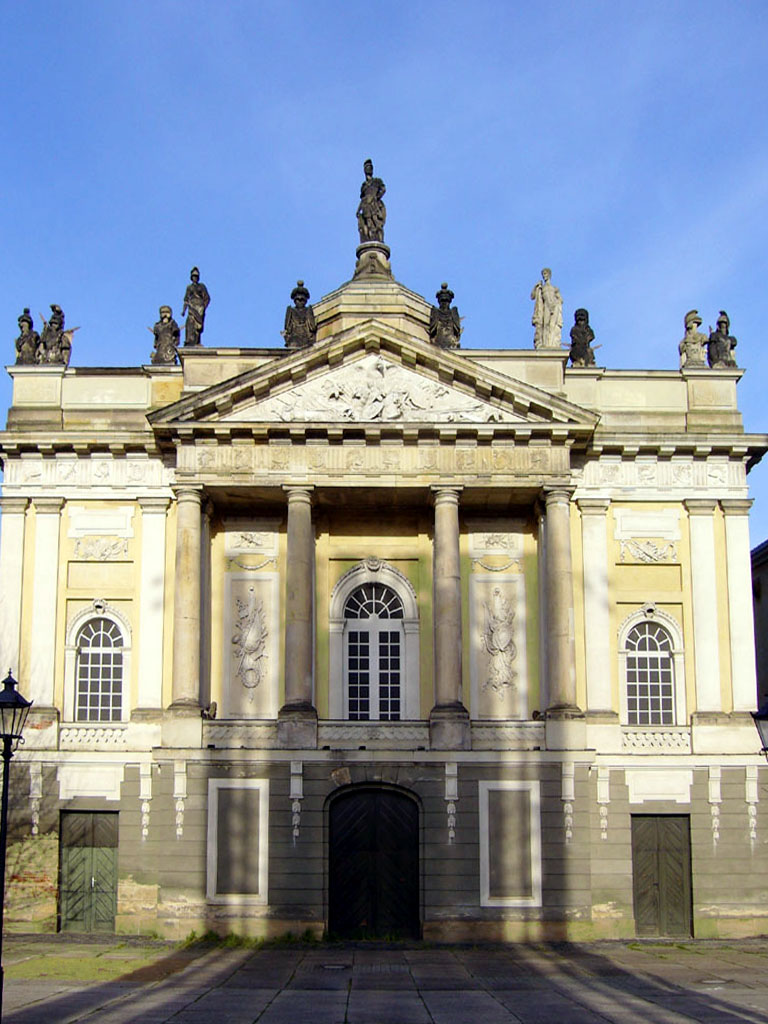
Langer Stall front facade

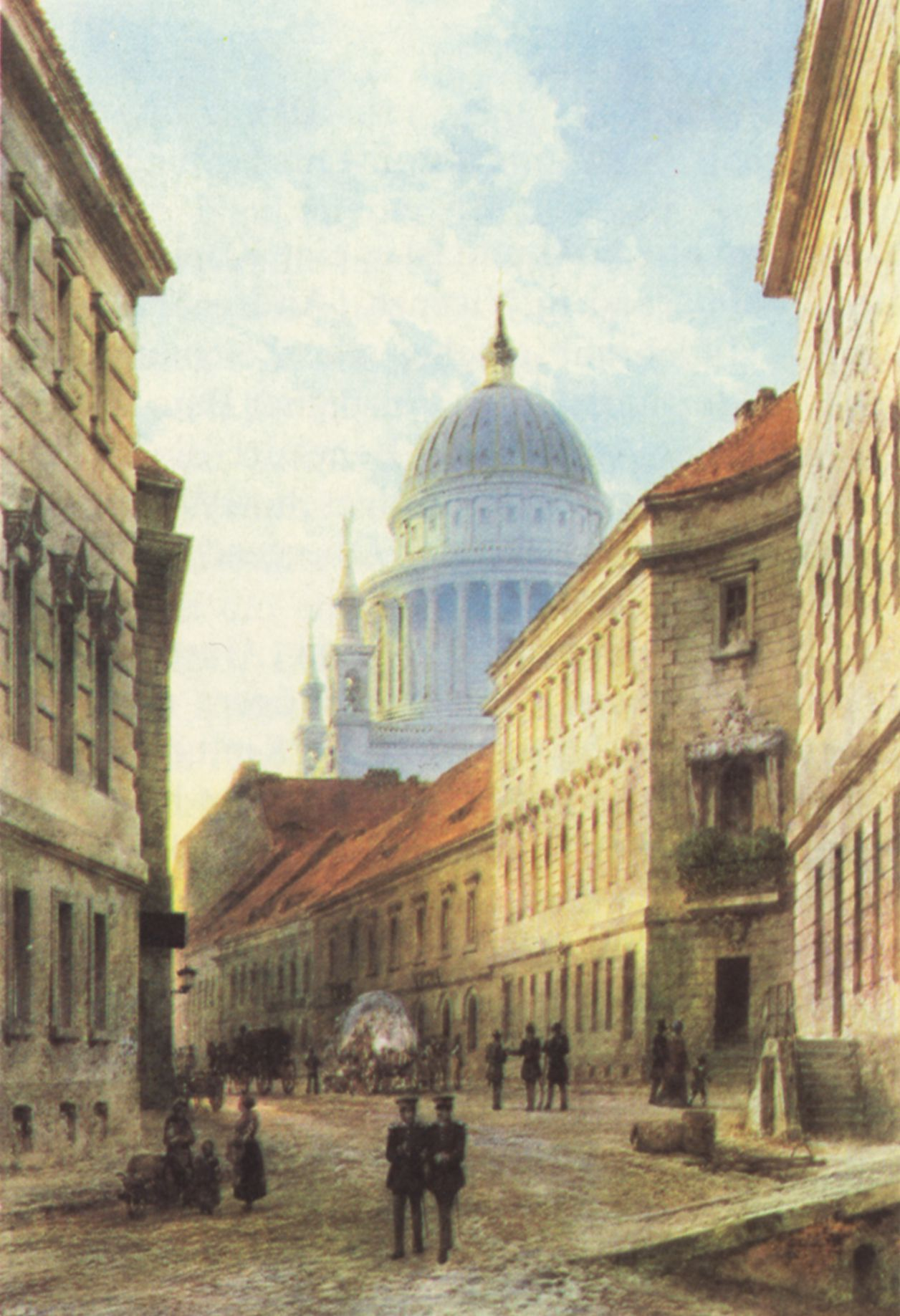
Acht Ecken

== Literature ==
- Andreas Kitschke (2001), Die Potsdamer Kirchen (in German), Passau: Kunstverlag Peda, ISBN 3-89643-530-2
- Potsdamer Schlösser in Geschichte and Kunst (in German) (4 ed.), Leipzig: VEB F.A. Brockhaus Verlag, 1984, ISBN 3-325-00030-4 (Hrsg: Staatliche Archivverwaltung der DDR, Staatliche Schlösser and Gärten Potsdam-Sanssouci)
