= Prussian Palaces and Gardens Foundation Berlin-Brandenburg =

German foundation in Berlin-Brandenburg

- Established: 1 January 1995
- Mission: Heritage conservation
- Chairman: Hartmut Dorgerloh
- Location: Potsdam
- Website: www.spsg.de

The Prussian Palaces and Gardens Foundation Berlin-Brandenburg (German: Stiftung Preußische Schlösser und Gärten Berlin-Brandenburg; SPSG) was founded by a treaty of 23 August 1994 between the German federal states of Berlin and Brandenburg as a public foundation following German reunification. The treaty came into force on 1 January 1995. The foundation is separate from the considerably larger Prussian Cultural Heritage Foundation (Stiftung Preußischer Kulturbesitz).

== History ==
The SPSG is an amalgamation of the Potsdam-Sanssouci State Palaces and Gardens (Staatlichen Schlösser und Gärten Potsdam-Sanssouci) in the former East Germany and the State Palaces and Gardens Administration (Verwaltung der Staatlichen Schlösser und Gärten) in West Berlin that had been formed following the division of Germany. These institutions were formed from the Prussian State Palaces and Gardens Administration that had been founded on 1 April 1927 as a result of the apportionment of assets and liabilities between the House of Hohenzollern and the Prussian state and which was disbanded in 1945.

The SPSG has its headquarters in Brandenburg's capital city, Potsdam. Its owners are the states of Berlin (21.35%) and Brandenburg (36.60%) and the federal government (42.05%) (as at: 2007). The foundation receives other support from numerous societies and private sponsors.

The Berlin-Brandenburg Foundation For Prussian Palaces and Gardens was listed in 2001 in the "Blue Book" that publishes a list of heritage sites in eastern Germany that are of national significance and currently includes 20 so-called "cultural beacons" (kulturelle Leuchttürme). The selection of heritage sites was based on an initiative of the commissaries of the Federal Office of Heritage and the Media and voted on by the East German ministers of culture.

== Properties of SPSG ==
The Foundation manages and administers approximately 500 employees in Potsdam, Brandenburg and Berlin, about 300 buildings or structures, including more than 150 historic buildings and nearly 800 acres (320 ha) of gardens, with Potsdam-Berlin's cultural landscape forming the largest part. With the treaty of SPSG coming into force, these land and buildings are included in the inventory:

=== In Brandenburg ===
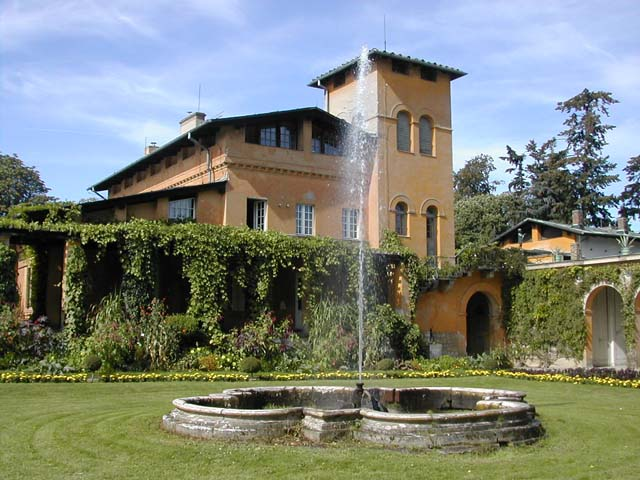
Gardener's House with the Roman Baths

Buildings and parks in Potsdam:

- Sanssouci Park (289 ha) including Sanssouci, New Palace, Charlottenhof Palace, Picture Gallery, New Chambers, Orangery Palace, Dragon House, Belvedere auf dem Klausberg, Roman Baths, Chinese House, pheasant, dairy, Historic Mill, Ruinenberg, stables and other buildings in the park.
- New Garden including the Holy Lake (146 ha) with Marble Palace, Cecilienhof Castle, dairy, Orangerie, Gothic library building and other buildings in the park.
- Babelsberg Park (114 ha) including Babelsberg Palace, kitchen buildings, steam-powered pump house, Flatowturm, Gerichtslaube, Little Castle, sailor's house and various buildings.

Historic buildings in Potsdam outside the parks:

- Stern Hunting Lodge, former stables of the castle town, steam-powered pump house of Sanssouci, Kopfbau zum Langen Stall, Lindstedt Castle, Belvedere on the Pfingstberg, Pomona Temple, Thiemann House.

Castles in Brandenburg:

- Rheinsberg Palace and Park (27 ha), including all ancillary buildings, waters and bridges, Sacrow Castle and Park (38 ha), Caputh Castle and Park (5 ha), Wusterhausen Royal Castle and Park (5 ha), including ancillary facilities.

In 2001 palaces in Paretz and Oranienburg were added in order to support museums.

=== In Berlin ===
Charlottenburg Palace

- Charlottenburg Park (55,44 ha) including Charlottenburg Palace, Belvedere, Mausoleum and New Pavillon (housing artworks including Friedrich's The Garden Terrace)
- Grunewald Hunting Lodge
- Pfaueninsel (76 ha) including Pfaueninsel Palace and other buildings in the park
- Glienicke Park (7,2 ha) including Glienicke Palace and other buildings in the park
- Schönhausen Palace

== See also ==
- Palaces and Parks of Potsdam and Berlin
