= Orangery Palace =

Palace in Potsdam, Germany

- Orangerieschloss
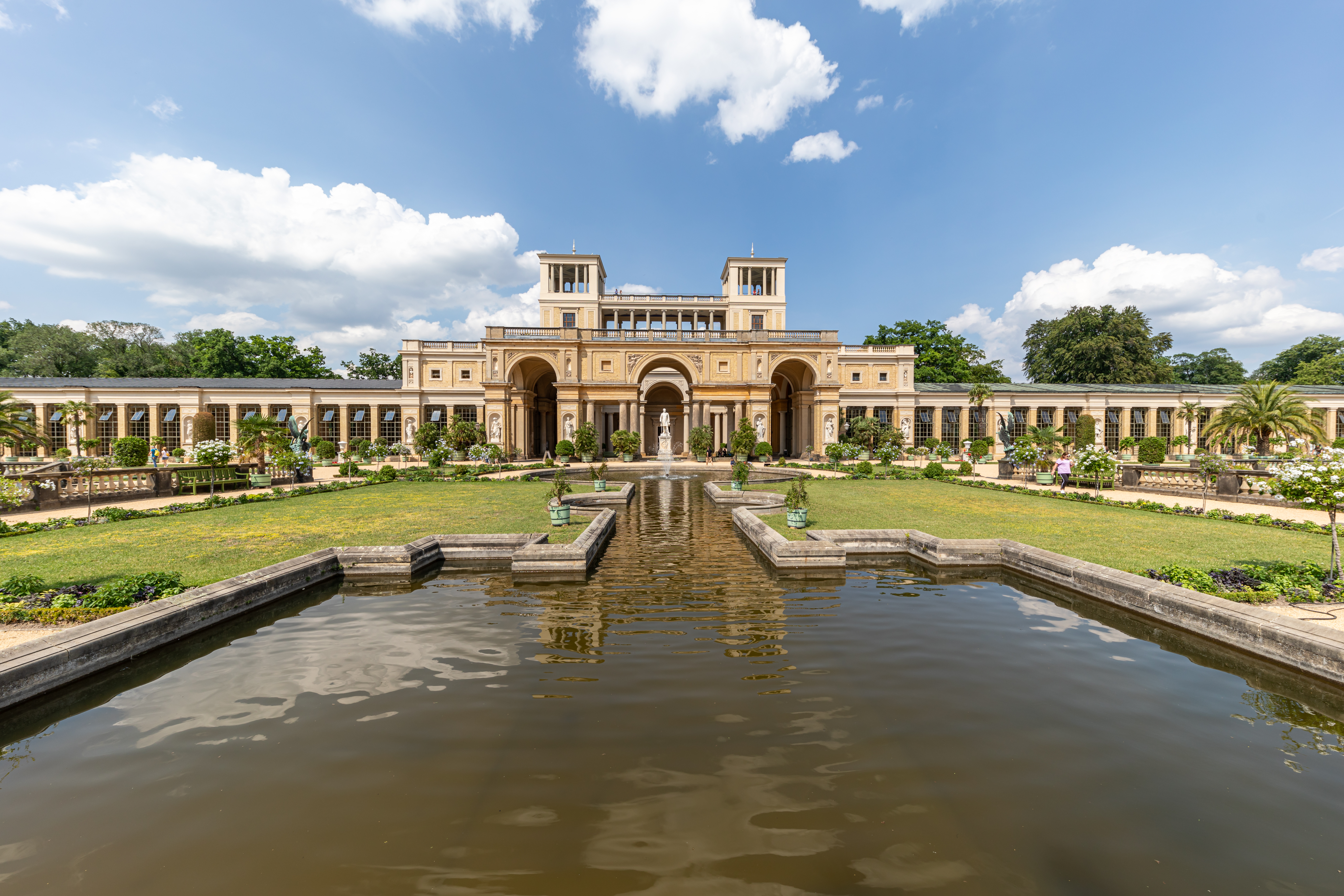
- The Orangery Palace

- Location within Germany Location within Brandenburg
- Alternative names: Neue Orangerie auf dem Klausberg

General information
- Type: Palace
- Architectural style: Renaissance Revival
- Location: Potsdam, Germany
- Coordinates: 52.405°N 13.029°E
- Construction started: 1851
- Completed: 1864
- Client: Frederick William IV of Prussia
- Owner: Stiftung Preußische Schlösser und Gärten Berlin-Brandenburg

Design and construction
- Architects: Friedrich August Stüler; Ludwig Ferdinand Hesse

Website
- www.spsg.de/en/palaces-gardens/object/orangery-palace/

The Orangery Palace (German: Orangerieschloss) is a palace located in the Sanssouci Park of Potsdam, Germany. It is also known as the New Orangery on the Klausberg, or just the Orangery. It was built on behest of the "Romantic on the Throne", King Frederick William IV of Prussia from 1851 to 1864.

== Background ==
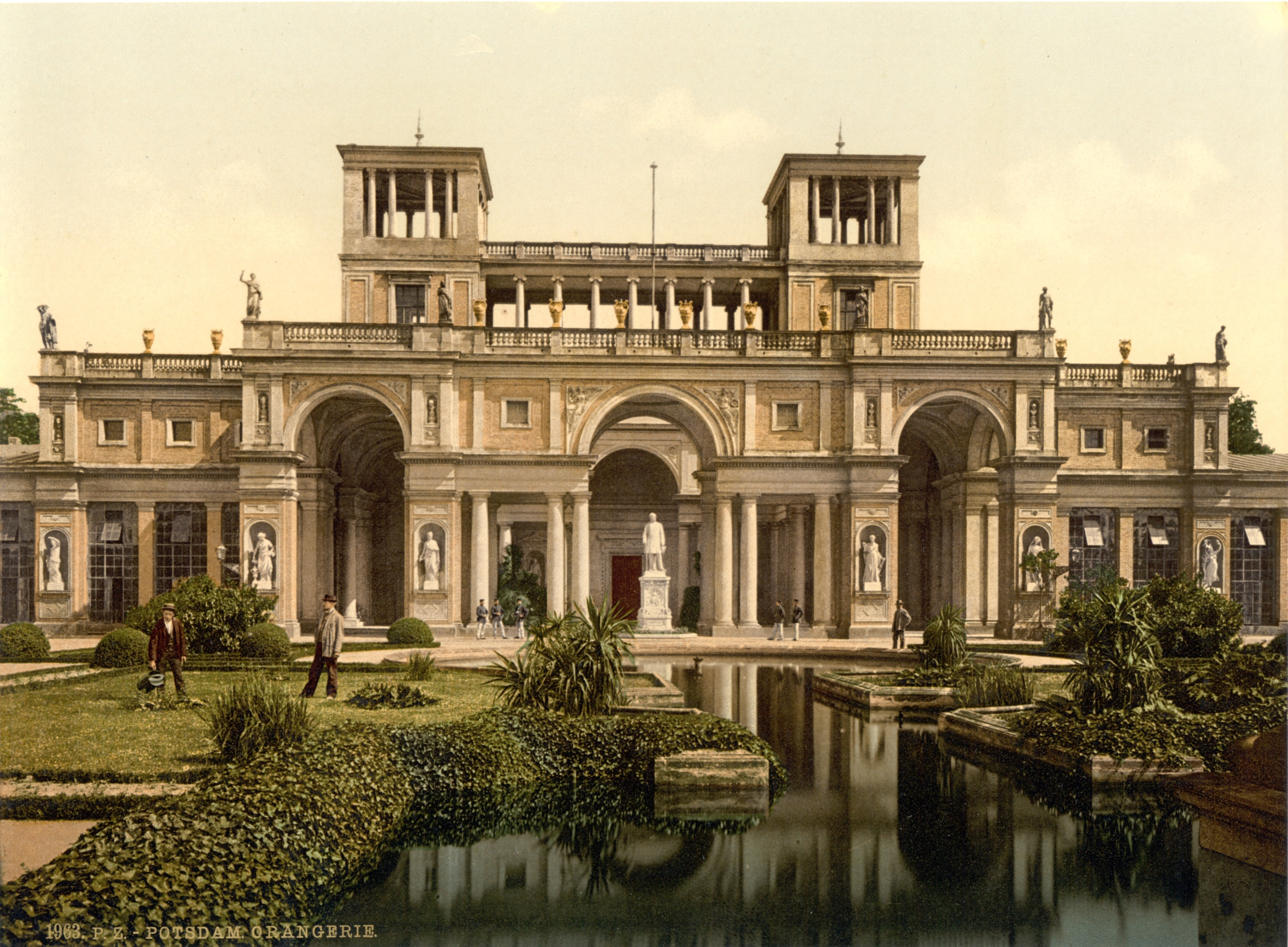
The Orangery Palace around 1900

The building of the Orangery began with a plan for a high street or triumph street. It was to begin at the triumph arch, east of Sanssouci Park, and end at the Belvedere on the Klausberg. The difference in elevation was to be balanced with viaducts.

With reference to the north side of the Picture Gallery and the New Chambers from the time of Frederick the Great, Frederick William IV sketched out more new buildings, which would decorate his two kilometer long Via Triumphalis.

Because of the political unrest of the period (March Revolution) and lack of funding, the gigantic project never materialized. Only the Orangery Palace and the Triumphtor were ever realized.

== The Palace ==
The construction of the Orangery Palace began after designs by the architects Friedrich August Stüler, Friedrich Ludwig Persius and Ludwig Ferdinand Hesse.

The building, with its 300-meter-long front, was built in the style of the Italian Renaissance, after the image of the Villa Medici in Rome and the Uffizi in Florence.

The middle building with its twin towers is the actual palace. This building is joined to the 103 meter long and 16 meter wide Plant Hall, with its almost ceiling-to-floor windows on the south side. In the western hall, the original floor duct heating system is still present and functioning. In the alcoves along the garden side of the castle annex, there are allegorical figures of the months and seasons. In the corner building at the end of the Orangery Hall were the royal apartments and the servants' quarters.

In front of the peristyle Elisabeth, Frederick William IV's wife, had a statue of the king erected in Memoriam after his death in 1861.

== Orangery interior ==
Behind the portico, in the middle building, lies the over two-story-tall Raffael Hall. It was based on the Sala Regia in the Vatican. Over a large skylight in the high clouded ceiling, light falls into the Museum Hall. On the red silk covered walls, hang over fifty copies of Renaissance paintings and frescoes. Frederick William IV inherited the works from his father, King Frederick William III of Prussia, and assembled them here.

The royal apartments were outfitted in the second Rococo style, connected to both sides of the Raffael Hall. They were intended as guest rooms for Tsar Nicholas I and his wife, Alexandra Feodorovna. The Tsarina was the favorite sister of Frederick William IV, Charlotte, who gave up her name along with her homeland when she married.

Between 1949 and 2010 the Palace also housed premises of the Brandenburgian State Main Archive in its eastern wing.

== Garden construction ==
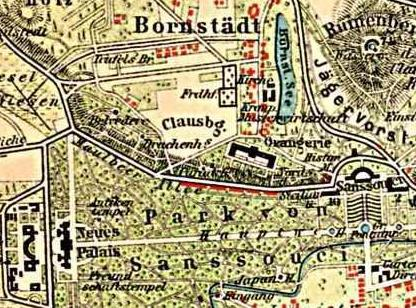
Klausberg around 1900

The gardens were styled after those of the Italian Renaissance by the garden architect, Peter Joseph Lenné. In the west, below the annex, he designed the Paradise Garden in 1843–44. It contains many exotic flowers and foliage plants. The atrium, a small building in middle of the compound, designed in the ancient style, was built on plans by Ludwig Persius in 1845. The current Botanical Garden, with its systematically arranged planting, is used by the University of Potsdam as a teaching garden.

The Norse and Sicilian Gardens lie to the east. These completely different garden sections were laid out by Lenné between 1857 and 1860. The dark, effective Norse Garden, with its pines, was to have been an element of the planned triumph street.

The Sicilian Garden, with its palm tubs, myrtles, laurels, flowers, arcades, and fountains, runs southward.

== World Heritage Site ==
Since 1990, the Orangery has been part of the UNESCO World Heritage Site "Palaces and Parks of Potsdam and Berlin". The palace is administered by the Stiftung Preußische Schlösser und Gärten Berlin-Brandenburg.

== See also ==
- List of sights of Potsdam
- List of castles in Berlin and Brandenburg
- Palaces and Parks of Potsdam and Berlin

== Additional reading ==
- Paul Sigel, Silke Dähmlow, Frank Seehausen und Lucas Elmenhorst, Architekturführer Potsdam - Architectural Guide, Dietrich Reimer Verlag, Berlin 2006, ISBN 3-496-01325-7.
- Gert Streidt, Klaus Frahm: Potsdam. Die Schlösser und Gärten der Hohenzollern. Könemann Verlagsgesellschaft mbH, Köln 1996, ISBN 3-89508-238-4
- Waltraud Volk: Potsdam. Historische Straßen und Plätze heute. 2nd edition, 1993. Verlag für Bauwesen Berlin-München 1993, ISBN 3-345-00488-7
