= Green Gate (disambiguation) =

Green Gate may refer to the following tourist attractions:

- Green Gate in Poland
- Green Gate, Potsdam, the main entrance to Sanssouci Park in Potsdam, Germany
- Green Gate, Devon, in Devon, England

== See also ==
- Greengates
