= Johann Melchior Kambly =

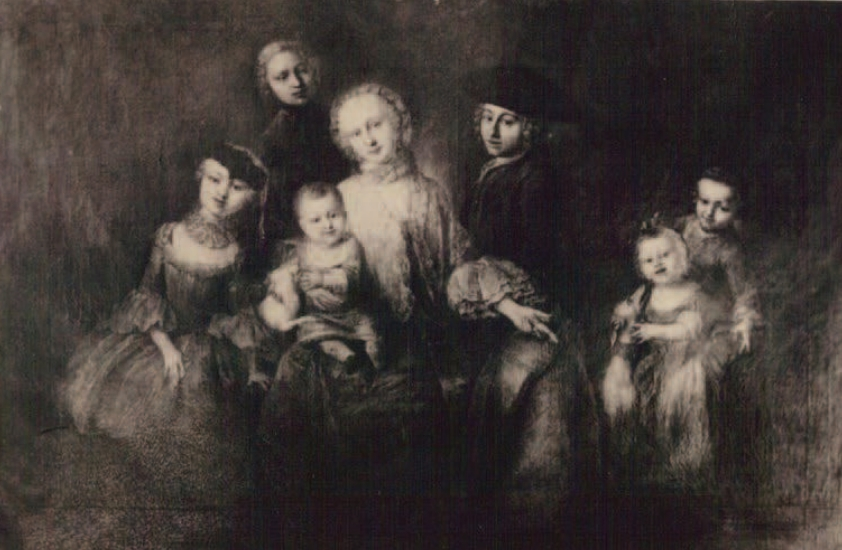
An oil painting depicting Kambly in hat with wife and children, c. 1755

Johann Melchior Kambly (January 1718 – 12 April 1783) was a Swiss sculptor who took part in the development of the architectural style of Frederician Rococo.

Kambly was born in Zürich. He worked predominantly as a royal architect in Potsdam and contributed to, among others, Sanssouci Palace, the New Palace, the Chinese House and the New Chambers. No works have been recognized from his Swiss period. He died in Potsdam.

The name Kambly is also written as Camply or Kambli.
