= Dragon House =

Coordinates: 52°24′22″N 13°01′17″E

- Drachenhaus
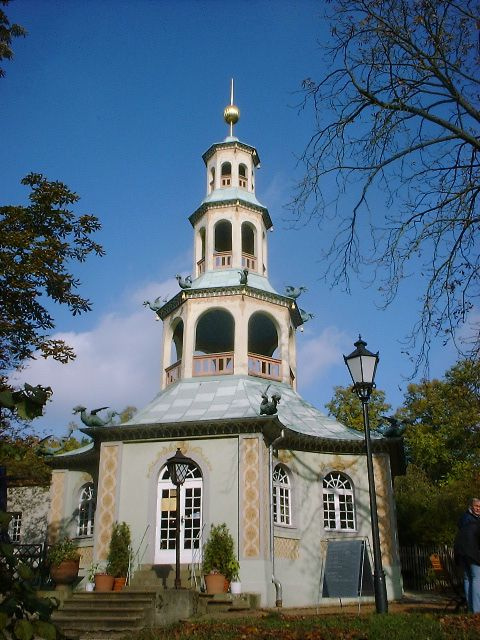
- The Dragon House from the South
- Interactive map of the Dragon House area

General information
- Type: Historical building
- Architectural style: Chinoiserie
- Location: Potsdam, Germany
- Construction started: 1770
- Completed: 1772
- Renovated: 1787

Dragon House (German Drachenhaus) is a historical building in Potsdam, Germany, built by King Frederick the Great of Prussia on the southern slope of the Klausberg, which borders the northern edge of Sanssouci Park. It was constructed between 1770 and 1772 in the prevailing Chinoiserie taste of the time, designed to imitate a Chinese pagoda. Carl von Gontard was commissioned to build it. The house served as the residence of the vineyard's vintner.

The Dragon House is named after the sixteen dragons on the corners of its concave roofs. Six years after the construction of the Chinese House in Sanssouci Park, Frederick's enthusiasm for Chinoiserie park structures was expressed once again with this creation.

Frederick the Great was stimulated to build in a Far Eastern style by Sir William Chambers's Designs of Chinese Buildings (1757) and from his Plans, elevations, section and perspective views of the gardens and buildings at Kew (1763). These architectural reference books were given to Frederick by the author, who had created for Augusta, Princess of Wales a large garden at Kew (near London), in which there still stands Chambers's many-tiered tapering Great Pagoda, completed in 1762.

The Dragon House at Sanssouci was built on an octagonal plan, with four floors not only to be decorative but also as living quarters for the wine-growers who worked on the neighbouring Weinberg. However, they did not move into the pagoda. To save the pagoda from its dilapidated state, it had to be restored in 1787. Ever since then it has been constantly inhabited by the overseer of the Belvedere on the Klausberg. Over the years, because of its inhabitation, an additional room, a laundry and three stables have extended the two rooms—a kitchen and an entrance hall—of the structure. The Dragon House has been used since 1934 in a gastronomical capacity.
