= Ruinenberg =

Hill in Potsdam, Germany

Coordinates: 52°24′35.50″N 13°02′16.60″E

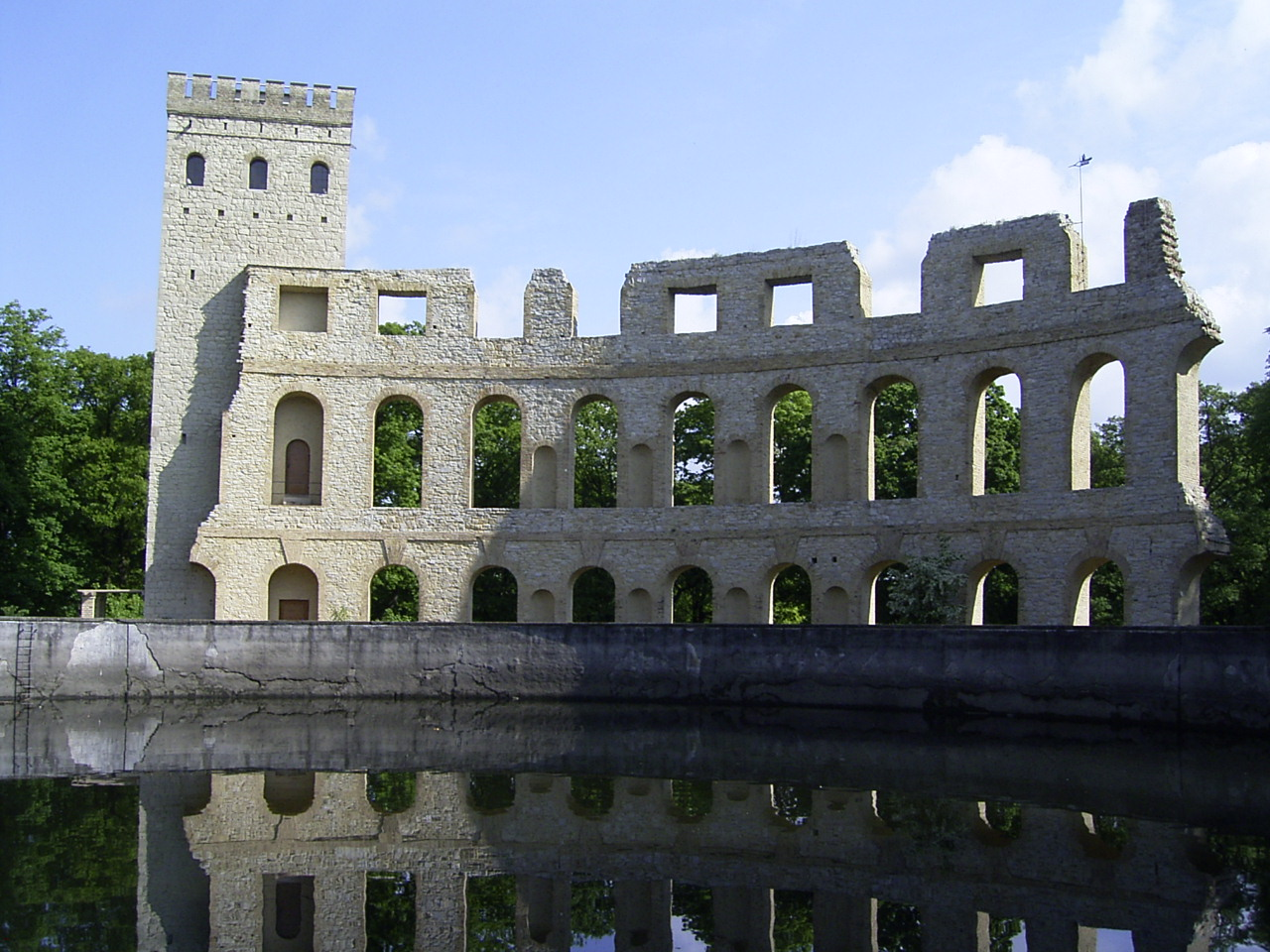
Norman Tower, Theatre Wall and tank

The Ruinenberg is a hill in the Bornstedt borough of Potsdam, located north of Sanssouci Park. In 1748, the Prussian king Frederick the Great had a water tank with a capacity of around 7,600 cubic metres (270,000 cu ft) or about 2,000,000 US gallons built on top to supply the Sanssouci water features, and had it decorated with artificial ruins. From 1841 a surrounding landscape garden was laid out at the behest of King Frederick William IV of Prussia, according to plans designed by Peter Joseph Lenné.

== History ==
The lands around the former Hünenberg hill had been part of the partridge and pheasant hunting grounds of Frederick's father King Frederick William I of Prussia. His son Frederick the Great began the erection of Sanssouci Palace in 1745.

Frederick wanted a lot of water for his then planned projects: a fountain complex, the Neptune Grotto, and a marble colonnade in Sanssouci Park, which is no longer standing. The plans intended to draw water from the Havel with windmills into the high basin on the mountain. It then flowed under the park through a tubular system of hollowed tree trunks, which was to bring the water up into the fountains.

Though the king poured a great deal of money into the project, it yielded no success because of the technical ignorance of his men. After many years of effort, Frederick's dream of fountains was finally given up in 1780.

In a letter to Voltaire, he wrote in 1778:

I wanted to have a water jet in my garden: Euler calculated the force of the wheels necessary to raise the water to a reservoir, from where it should fall back through channels, finally spurting out in Sans Souci. My mill was carried out geometrically and could not raise a mouthful of water closer than fifty paces to the reservoir. Vanity of vanities! Vanity of geometry!

Master builder Georg Wenzeslaus von Knobelsdorff and theatre painter Innocente Bellavite designed blinds of imitation antique ruins. A Monopteros (round temple), three high ionic columns, a small pyramid, and a ruined wall, designed as if from a Roman theatre, were grouped around the pool.

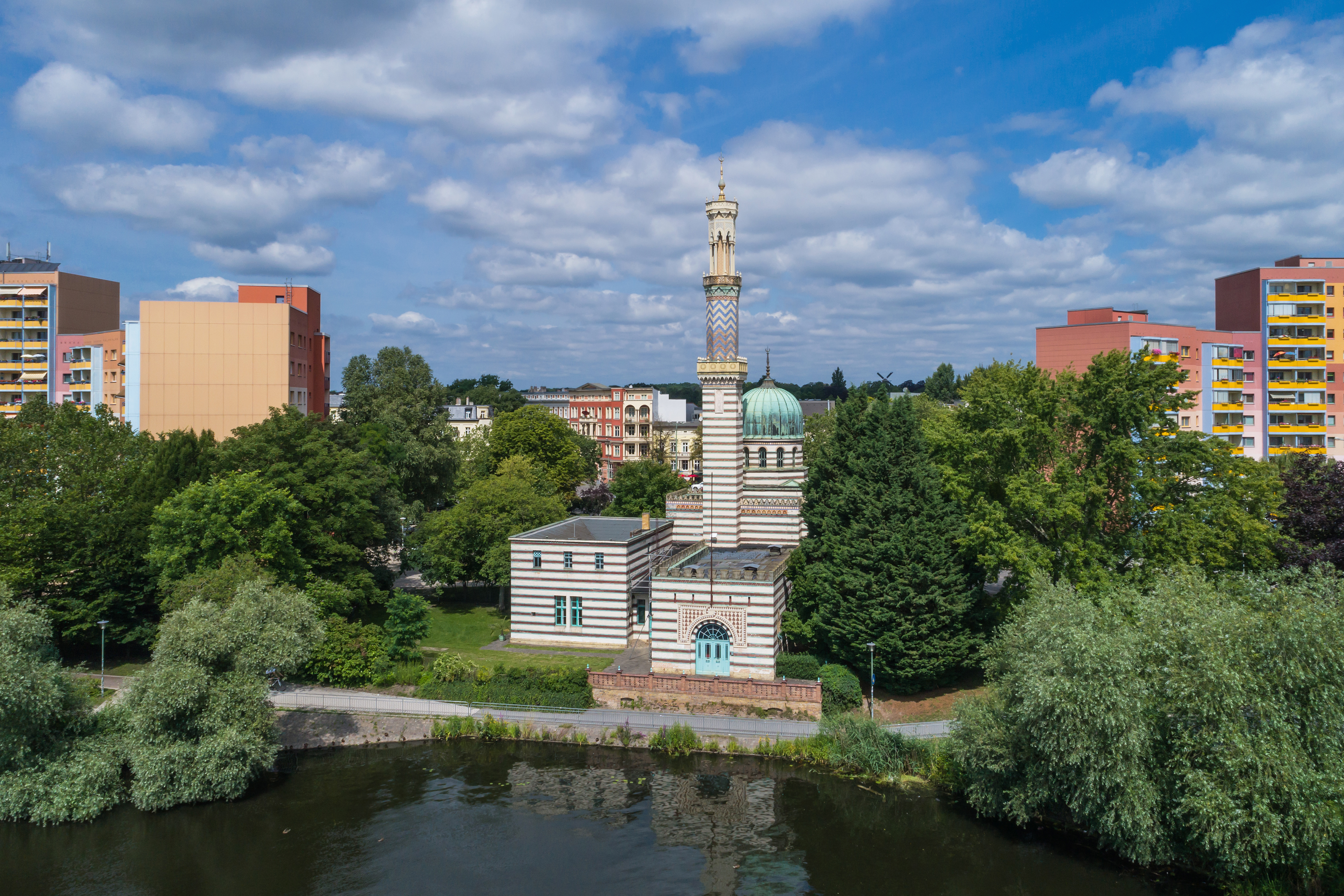
The Pump House on the Havel

Around a century after the construction of Sanssouci, Friedrich Wilhelm IV realized Frederick's dream. Through new technical possibilities of the steam engine and a modern piping system, the fountains were put into place. A building was erected especially for the steam engine (August Borsig) and its pump machine from 1841 to 1843 on the shore of the Havel. Disguised as a mosque, it was designed by Ludwig Persius.

Persius also had plans to extend the theater wall on the Ruinenberg with a 23 metres (75 ft) high look-out tower, in imitation of a medieval watchtower. After his early death, the so-called Norman Tower was built by Ferdinand von Arnim in 1846.
