= Neptune Grotto =

Artificial human constructed architectural cave in Potsdam

Coordinates: 52°24′12″N 13°02′32″E

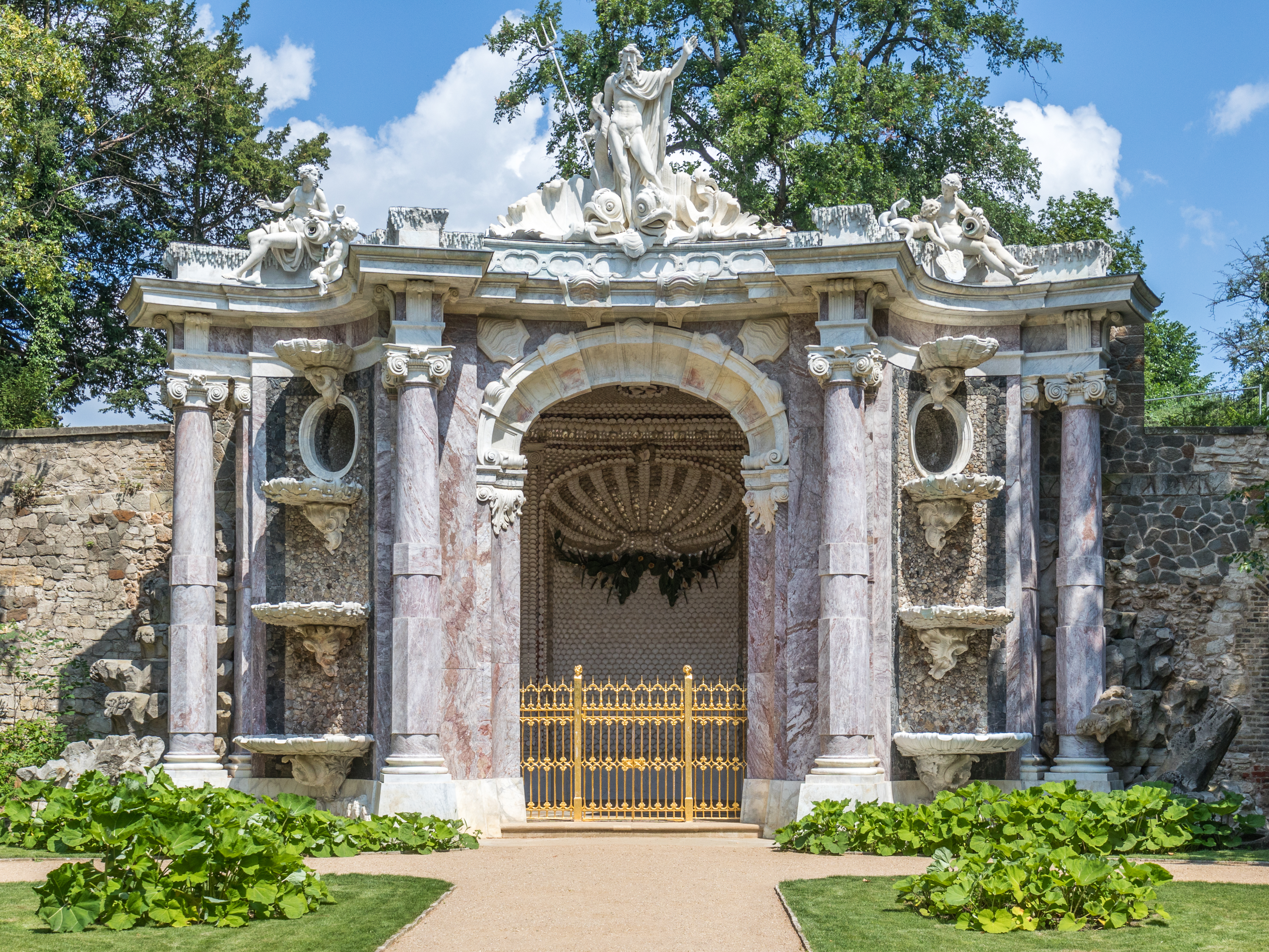
Neptune Grotto, 2019

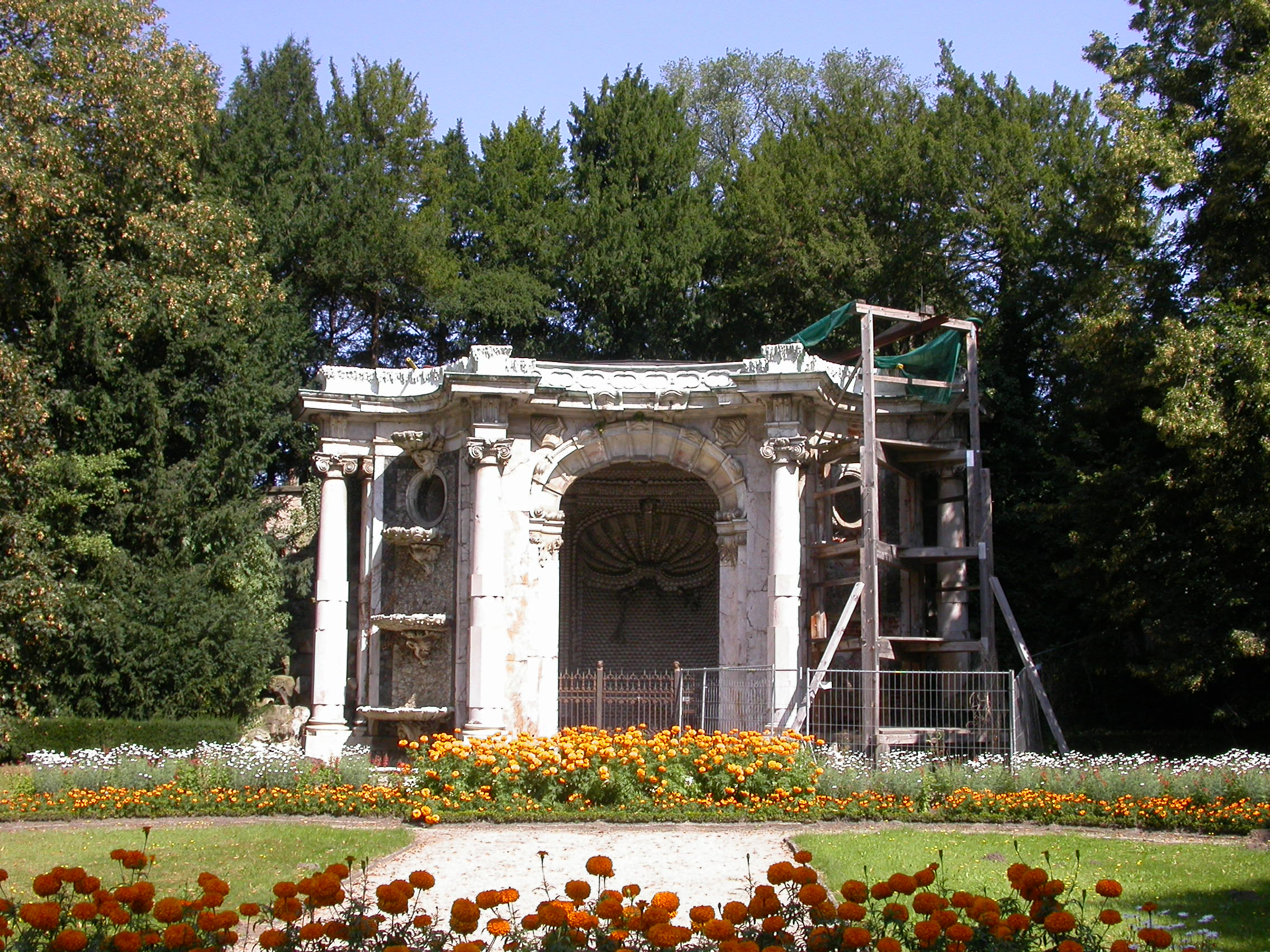
Neptune Grotto, 2009

The Neptune Grotto (German: Neptungrotte) close to the Obelisk entrance in Sanssouci Park, Potsdam, was created by Frederick the Great between 1751 and 1757 (268 years ago) to beautify the park.

Built following plans by Georg Wenzeslaus von Knobelsdorff it arose as a representation of the revived interest in garden architecture. The grotto ought to have been a component of the numerous fountains of the park, which did not function at that time, owing to a lack of technical knowledge.

The trident wielding god of the sea, Neptune, establishes a relationship to water. The conches on the sides, arranged into the shape of waterfalls and the great shell inside, made from many real shells, are a characteristic theme of Rococo.
