= Chinese House (Potsdam) =

Garden pavilion in Potsdam, Germany

Coordinates: 52°24′1″N 13°1′55″E

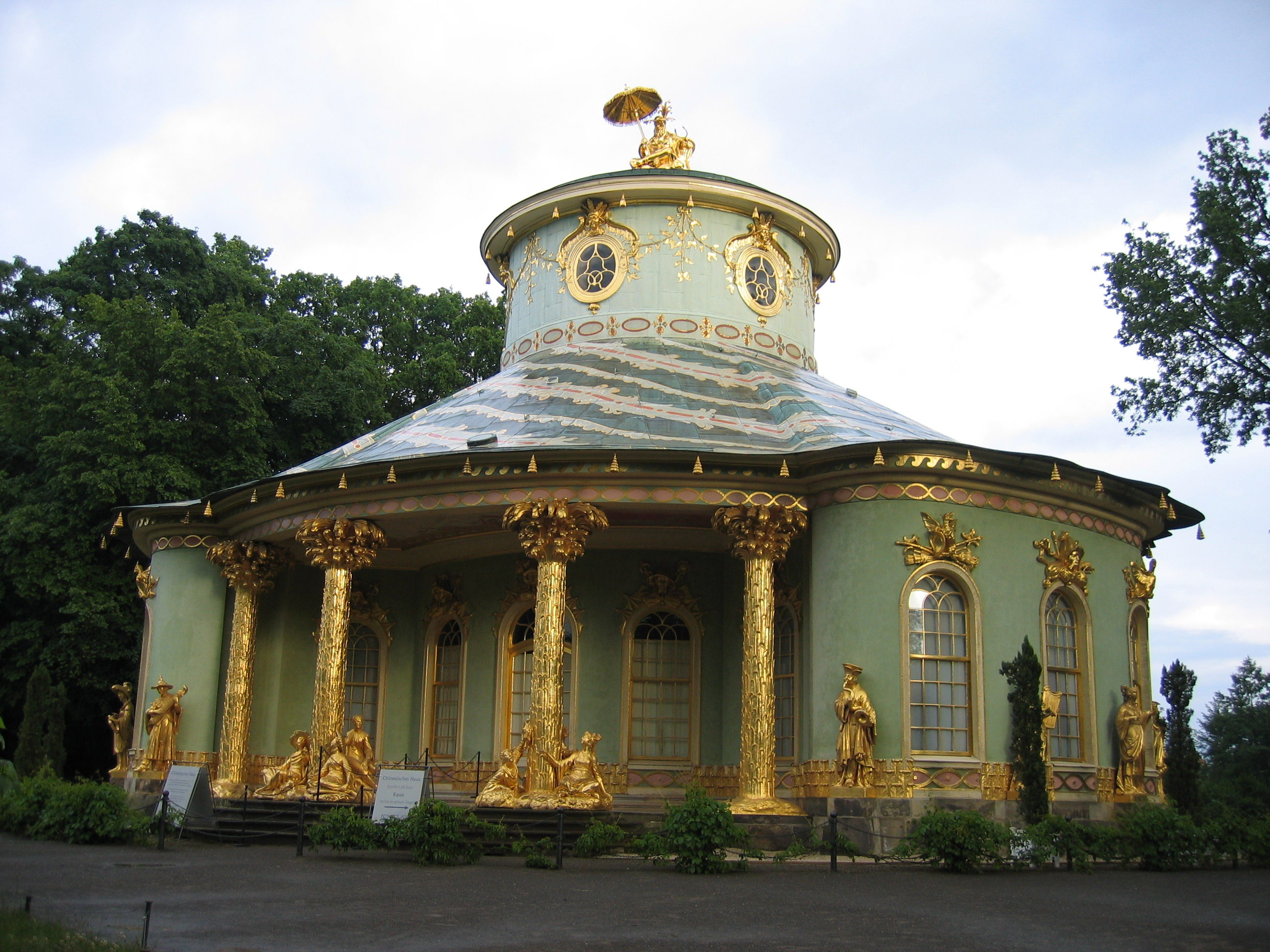
The Chinese House

The Chinese House (German: Chinesisches Haus) is a garden pavilion in Sanssouci Park in Potsdam, Germany. Frederick the Great had it built, about seven hundred metres southwest of the Sanssouci Summer Palace, to adorn his flower and vegetable garden. The garden architect was Johann Gottfried Büring, who between 1755 and 1764 designed the pavilion in the then-popular style of Chinoiserie, a mixture of ornamental rococo elements and parts of Chinese architecture.

The unusually long building time of nine years is attributed to the Seven Years' War, during which Prussia's economic and financial situation suffered significantly. Only after the end of the war in 1763 were the chambers inside the pavilion furnished. As the building served not only as a decorative piece of garden architecture but also as a setting for small social events, Frederick the Great ordered the building of a Chinese Kitchen, a few metres south-east of the Chinese House. After a conversion in 1789, only the hexagonal windows show the Oriental character of the former outbuilding. A few years later, the Dragon House was built in the form of a Chinese pagoda on the northern edge of Sanssouci Park bordering Klausberg. The building was Frederick the Great's attempt to follow the Chinese fashion of the 18th century, which began in France before spreading to England, Germany, and Russia.

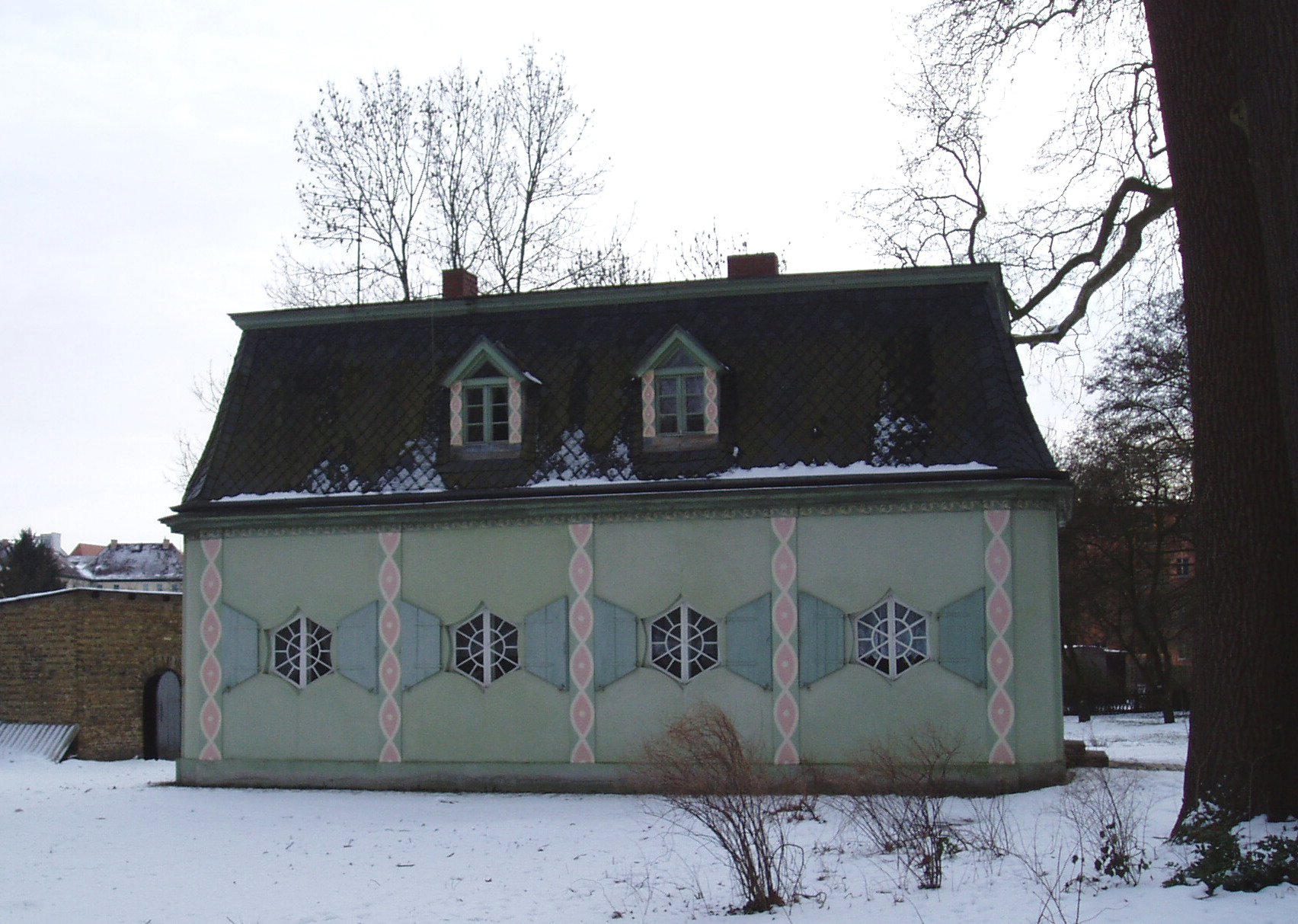
The former Chinese Kitchen following its conversion

== Chinoiserie ==
In the 17th century, Dutch traders brought Chinese mother-of-pearl, lacquer, silks and porcelain to Europe. In the noble courts of the baroque era, an interest in Oriental arts grew during the rococo period into Chinoiserie, a genuine fashion for all things Chinese. In addition to the enthusiasm for Asian luxury goods which harmonized with the certain forms of rococo, travelogues and exhibitions portrayed the carefree living of the Chinese, which corresponded with the European courts' ideal of a relaxed lifestyle. Whole rooms of palaces were decorated with porcelain, small Chinese-style furniture and wall murals which presented the ideal world that was supposedly China.

== Architecture ==
Frederick the Great modeled the Chinese House on the Maison du trèfle, a 1738 pavilion in the garden of the Palace of Lunéville, Lorraine. This trefoil-shaped building was created by the French architect Emmanuel Héré de Corny for the Duke of Lorraine, Stanislaus I, former King of Poland, who lived in exile in France. An exemplar of one of the etchings of the Maison published by Héré in 1753 was in the possession of Frederick the Great.

=== Outer design ===
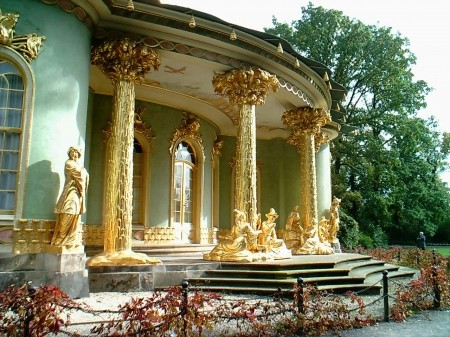
Northern entrance to the Chinese House

The Chinese House has the shape of a trefoil. The rounded central building contains three cabinet rooms regularly interspersed with free spaces. Rounded windows and French windows that reach almost to the ground let light into the pavilion's interior. The rolling tented copper ceiling is supported in the free space by four gilded sandstone columns, the work of the Swiss ornamental sculptor Johann Melchior Kambly, who was in the employ of Frederick the Great from 1746.

The gilded sandstone sculptures that sit at the feet of the columns and stand at the walls of the rooms originate from the workshops of the sculptors Johann Gottlieb Heymüller (c. 1715–1763) and Johann Peter Benckert (1709–1769). People from the area stood as models for the eating, drinking and music-making Chinese figures, which explains the statues' European features.

The cupola crowning the roof is surmounted by a gilded Chinese figure with an open parasol. Friedrich Jury created it in copper after a design by the sculptor Benjamin Giese. Light falls into the central chamber through the long oval window openings of the cupola as it does through the windows in the façade.

=== Interior design ===
The wall of the circular central chamber, accessible by the north side, is coated with stucco marble. Monkeys with musical instruments worked in stucco over the French windows, brackets holding porcelain and wall sconces between the windows are all coated with gold leaf. Likewise coated is a richly decorated chandelier which hangs from the cupola.

The ceiling painting on the higher circuit of the room is the work of Thomas Huber, dating from 1756. Huber also painted the ceilings of the empty chambers on the exterior surface. The plans of the French artist Blaise Nicholas Le Sueur, who taught as an art master at the Berlin Academy of Arts, served as a model for the interior. The ceiling paintings show Oriental men behind a balustrade, some looking into the room, others chatting with one another. They are surrounded by parrots, monkeys and Buddhas sitting on posts.

The walls between the central room and the adjoining chambers are decorated with brightly coloured, silken wall coverings painted with floral patterns, at the time a desired and valuable wall textile known as "Pekings". As may be seen here, Frederick the Great preferred to use for the interiors of his buildings only the highest quality materials manufactured by Prussian silk factories. Small fragments of this wall covering were used as a model for the reconstruction of the original during a restoration of 1990–1993.

== Additional reading ==
- Paul Sigel, Silke Dähmlow, Frank Seehausen und Lucas Elmenhorst, Architekturführer Potsdam - Architectural Guide, Dietrich Reimer Verlag, Berlin 2006, ISBN 3-496-01325-7.
