= Sanssouci Park =

UNESCO World Heritage Site
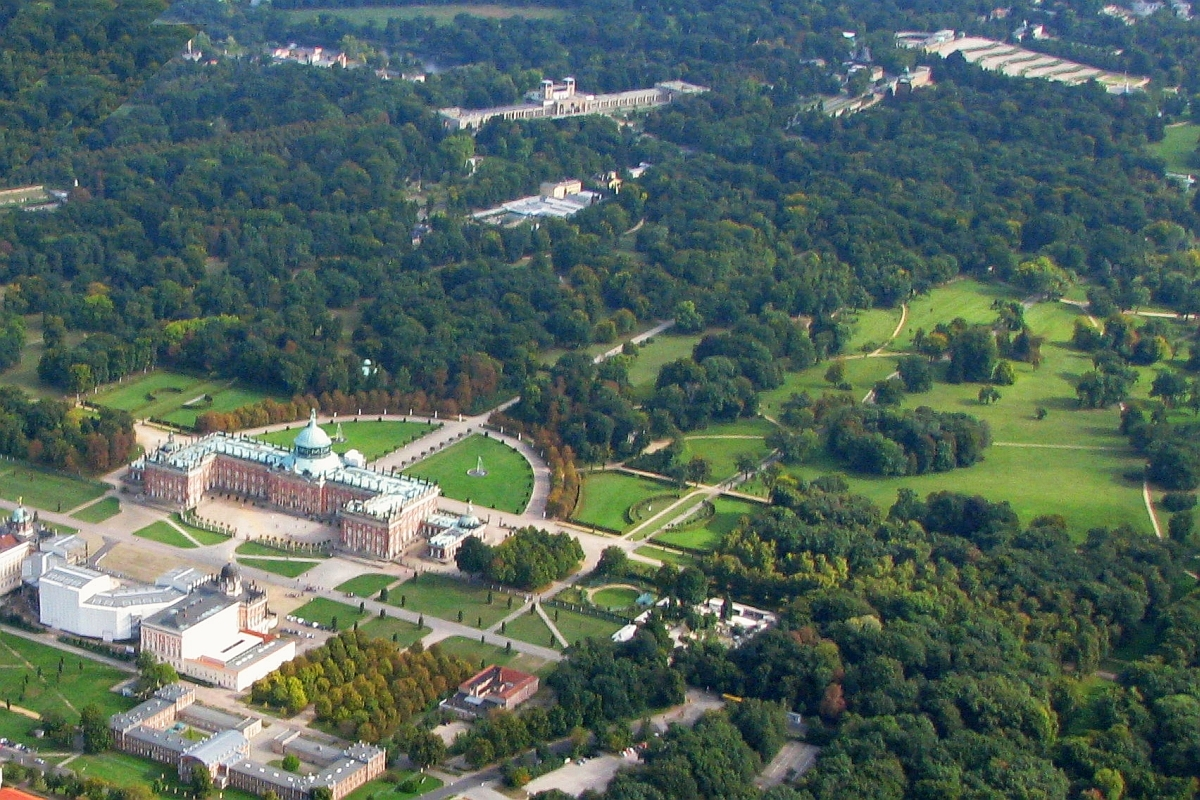
- New Palace (in front), Orangery Palace (background, center) and Sanssouci (background right)

- Location within Brandenburg Location within Germany
- Interactive map of Sanssouci Park
- Location: Potsdam, Brandenburg, Germany
- Part of: Palaces and Parks of Potsdam and Berlin
- Criteria: Cultural: (i)(ii)(iv)
- Reference: 532ter
- Inscription: 1990 (14th Session)
- Extensions: 1992, 1999
- Coordinates: 52°24′07″N 13°02′01″E

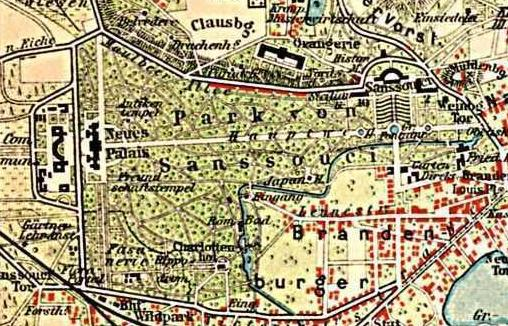
Sanssouci Park around 1900

Sanssouci Park is a large park surrounding Sanssouci Palace in Potsdam, Germany, built under Frederick the Great in the mid-18th century. Following the terracing of the vineyard and the completion of the palace, the surroundings were included in the structure. A Baroque flower garden with lawns, flower beds, hedges and trees was created. In the hedge quarter 3,000 fruit trees were planted. The greenhouses of the numerous nurseries contained oranges, melons, peaches and bananas. The goddesses Flora and Pomona, who decorate the entrance obelisk at the eastern park exit, were placed there to highlight the connection of a flower, fruit and vegetable garden. Along with the Sanssouci Palace and other nearby palaces and parks, Sanssouci Park was inscribed on the UNESCO World Heritage List in 1990 for its unique architectural unity and testimony to 18th and 19th century landscaping in Europe.

== Overview ==
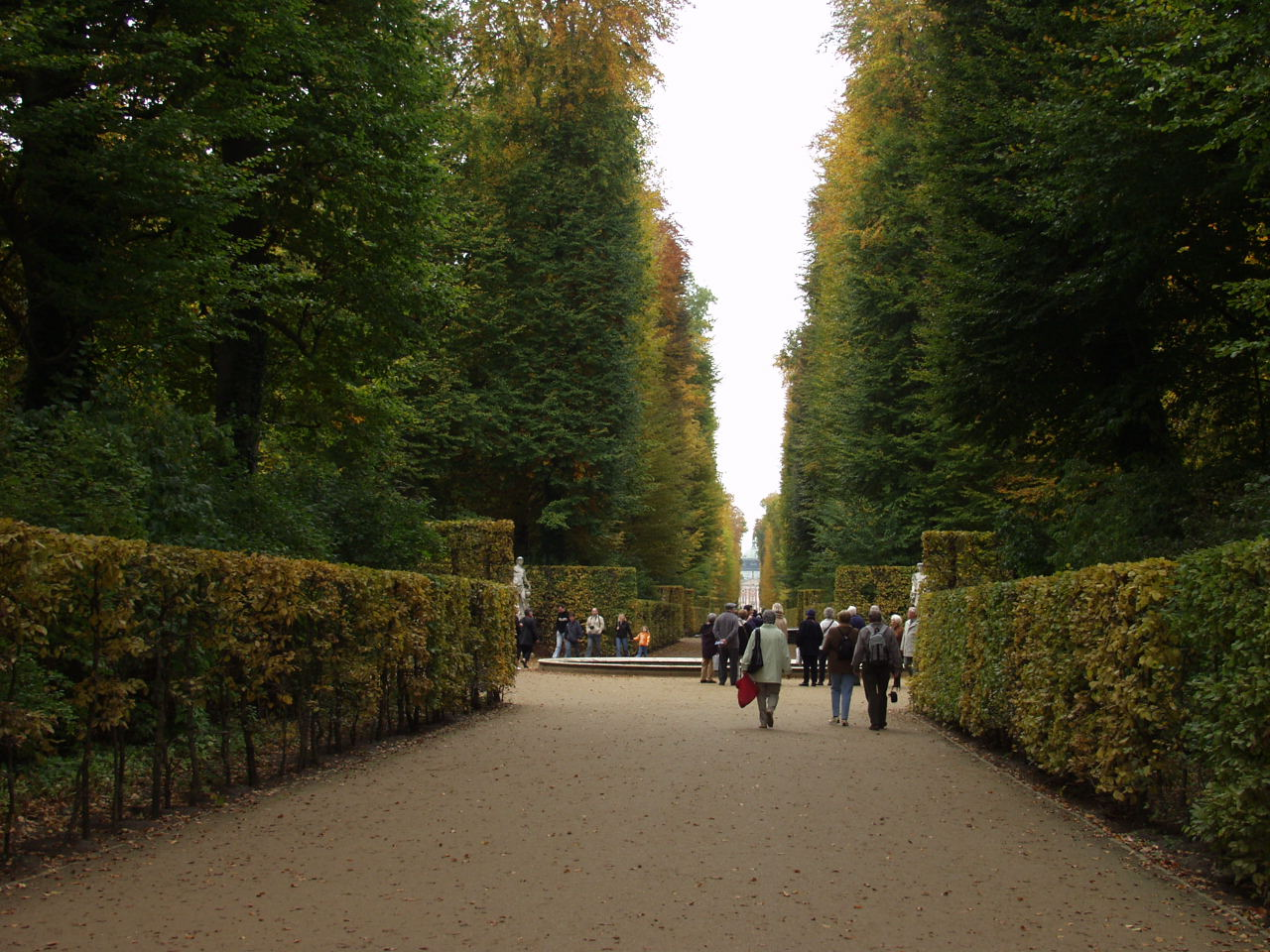
Clipped hedges and clipped trees keep the allées open

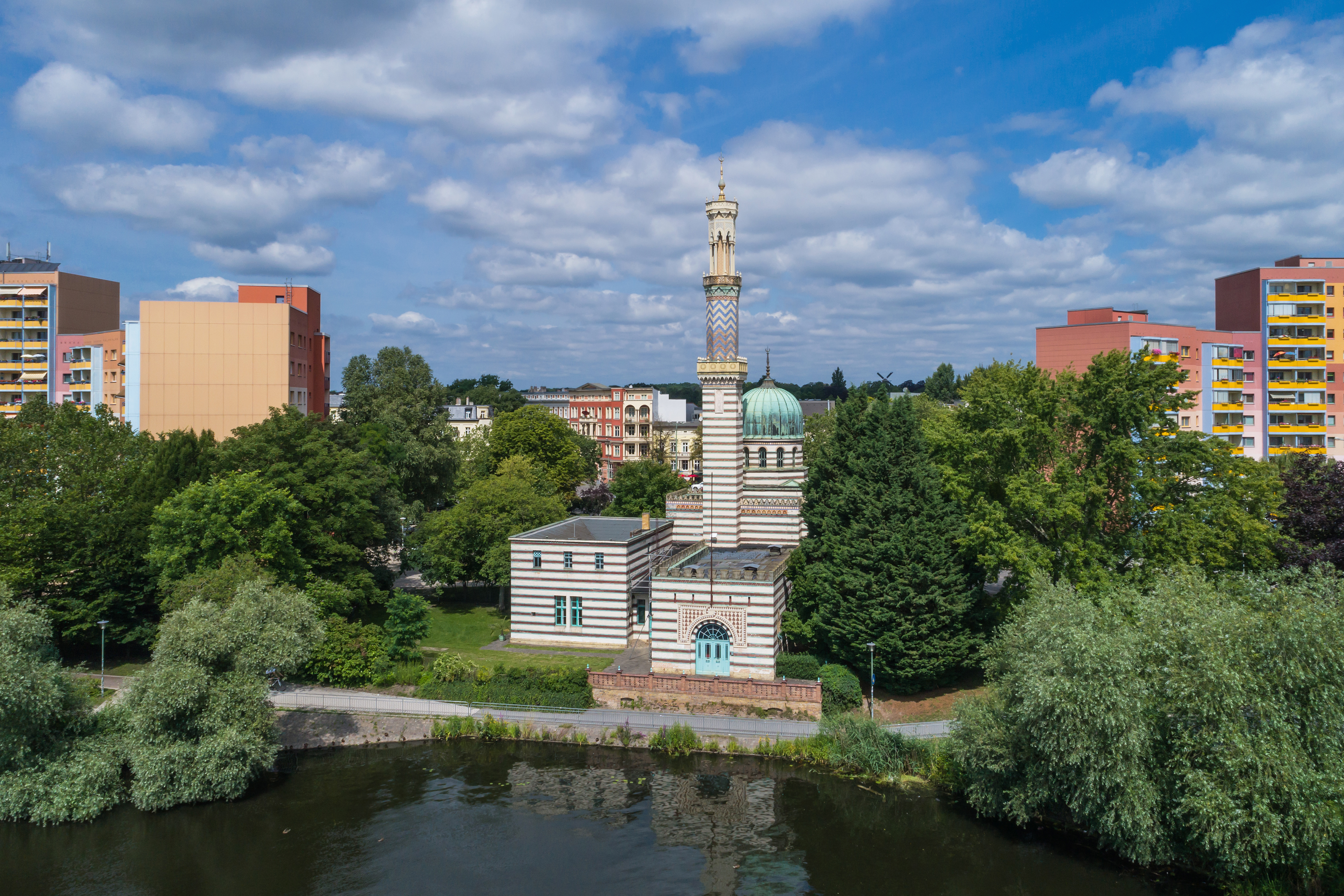
The mosque-like Pumping Station

With the expansion of the site after the creation of more buildings, a 2.5 km long straight main avenue was built. It began in the east at the 1748 obelisk and over the years was extended all the way to the New Palace, which marks its end in the west. In 1764 the picture gallery was constructed, followed by the New Chambers in 1774. They flank the palace and open the alley up to rondels with the fountains, surrounded by marble statues. From there paths lead in a star pattern between tall hedges to further parts of the gardens.

In his organisation of the park, Frederick continued what he had begun in Neuruppin and Rheinsberg. During his stay as Crown Prince in Neuruppin, where he was commander of a regiment from 1732 to 1735, he ordered that a flower, fruit and vegetable garden be laid out in the grounds of his abode. He already deviated here from the classical organisation of baroque gardens, which concerned themselves purely with the model represented by Versailles, by combining the beautiful and the useful. He also followed this principle in Rheinsberg. Apart from the transformation of the palace, which Frederick received as a present from his father Frederick William I in 1734, he ordered the establishment of fruit and vegetable garden areas enclosed by hedges. In addition the central avenue and a larger intersecting avenue did not lead directly to the palace, as was usual in French parks of the era, but took off from the south wing and at a right angle to the building.

Frederick invested heavily in the fountain system of Sanssouci Park, as water features were a firm component of baroque gardens. But the Neptune Grotto, finished in 1757 in the eastern part of the park, was used just as little for its intended function as the fountain facilities. Atop the Ruinenberg, roughly six hundred metres away, was a water basin from which no water could arrive into the park and because of the "fountaineers"' lack of expertise the project failed.

It did not succeed until steam power was employed one hundred years later, and thus the purpose of the water reservoir was finally fulfilled. In October 1842 an 81.4 horsepower steam engine built by August Borsig started working and made the water jet of the Great Fountain below the vineyard terraces rise to a height of 38 metres. A pumping station on the Havelbucht was especially built for this machine. It was commissioned by Frederick William IV and built by Ludwig Persius between 1841 and 1843, in the then fashionable Moorish Revival architectural style to look like "a Turkish Mosque with a minaret as a chimney".

Many years earlier, Frederick William III had acquired an area which bordered Sanssouci Park to the south and given it to his son Frederick William IV for Christmas in 1825. There Karl Friedrich Schinkel and Ludwig Persius built Charlottenhof Palace on the site of a former farm house and Peter Joseph Lenné was commissioned with the garden design. With the baroque flower and fruit and vegetable gardens from the Frederician era in mind, the garden architect converted the flat and partly swampy grounds into an open landscape park. Broad meadows created visual avenues between Charlottenhof, the Roman Baths and the New Palace with the Temple of Friendship developed from the time of Frederick the Great. Casually placed groups of bushes and trees and a moat that was broadened into a pond at its southeastern end beautify the large park. Lenné used the materials excavated to create the pond to construct a gentle hilly area landscape where the paths meet in the shape of stars at the high points.

== Buildings in Sanssouci Park ==
Built under Frederick the Great:

- Sanssouci
- Picture Gallery
- New Chambers
- Neptune Grotto
- Chinese House
- New Palace
- Temple of Friendship
- Antique Temple
- Obelisk entrance and the Obelisk

Built under Frederick William IV:

- Roman Baths
- Church of Peace with the neighbouring group of buildings

In the neighbouring area of Sanssouci:

- Ensemble of artistic ruins on the Ruinenberg
- Belvedere on the Klausberg
- Dragon House
- Orangery Palace or the New Orangery on the Klausberg
- Charlottenhof Palace
- Kaiserbahnhof at Potsdam Park Sanssouci railway station

== Points of interest ==
- Botanischer Garten Potsdam, a botanical garden established in 1950
- Green Gate, Potsdam, the main entrance to the park
- Historic Mill of Sanssouci
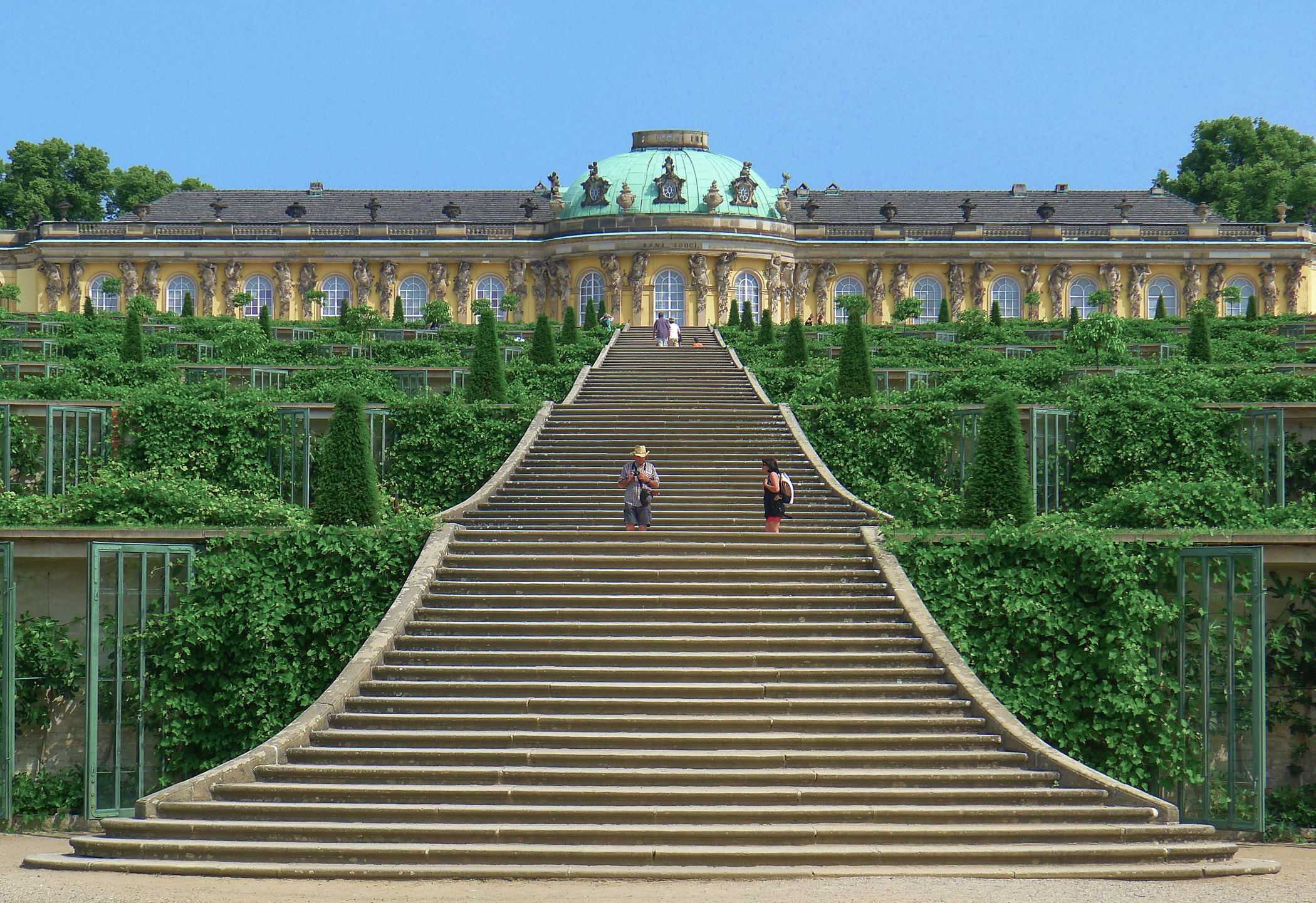
Sanssouci

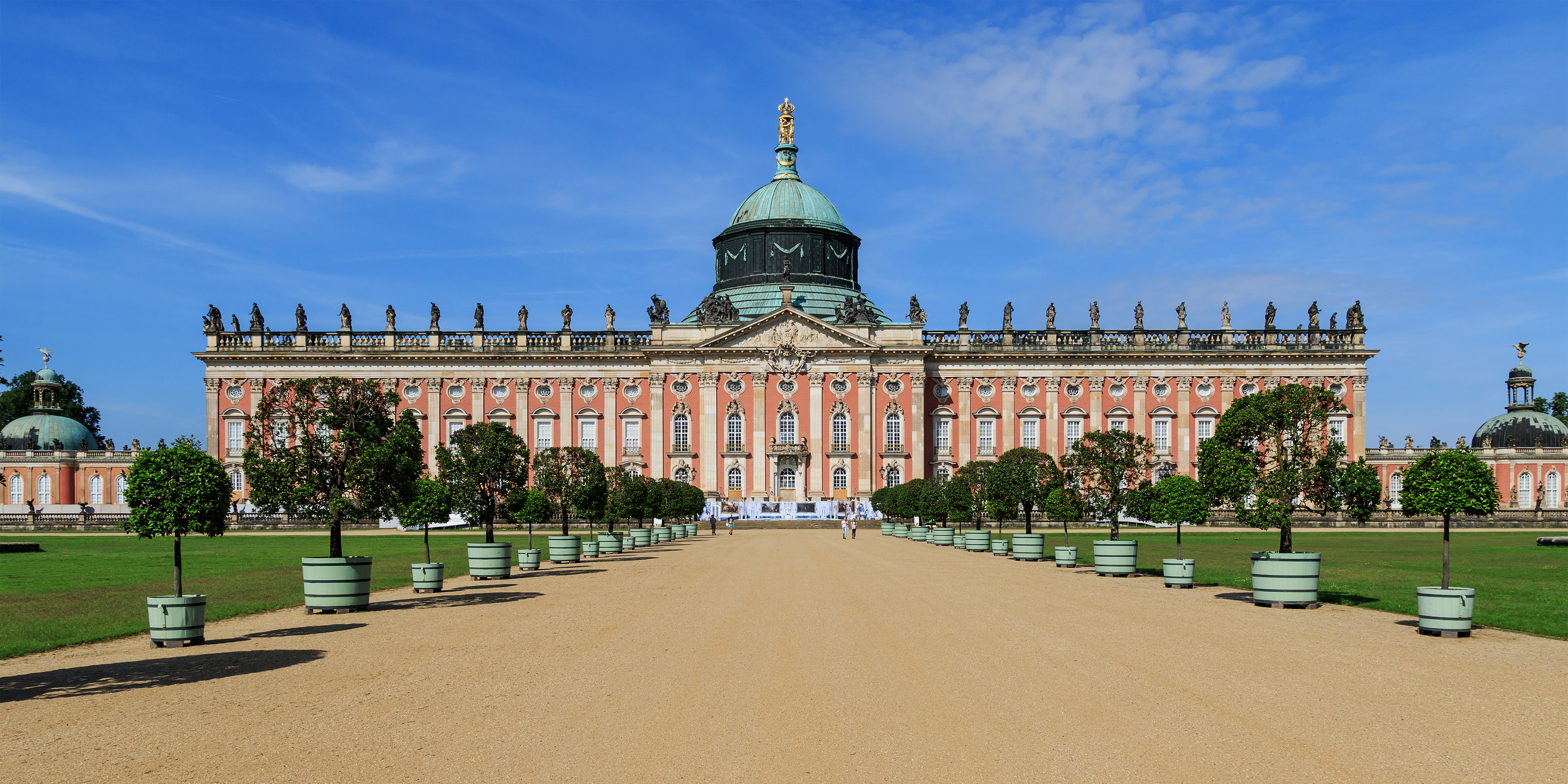
New Palace

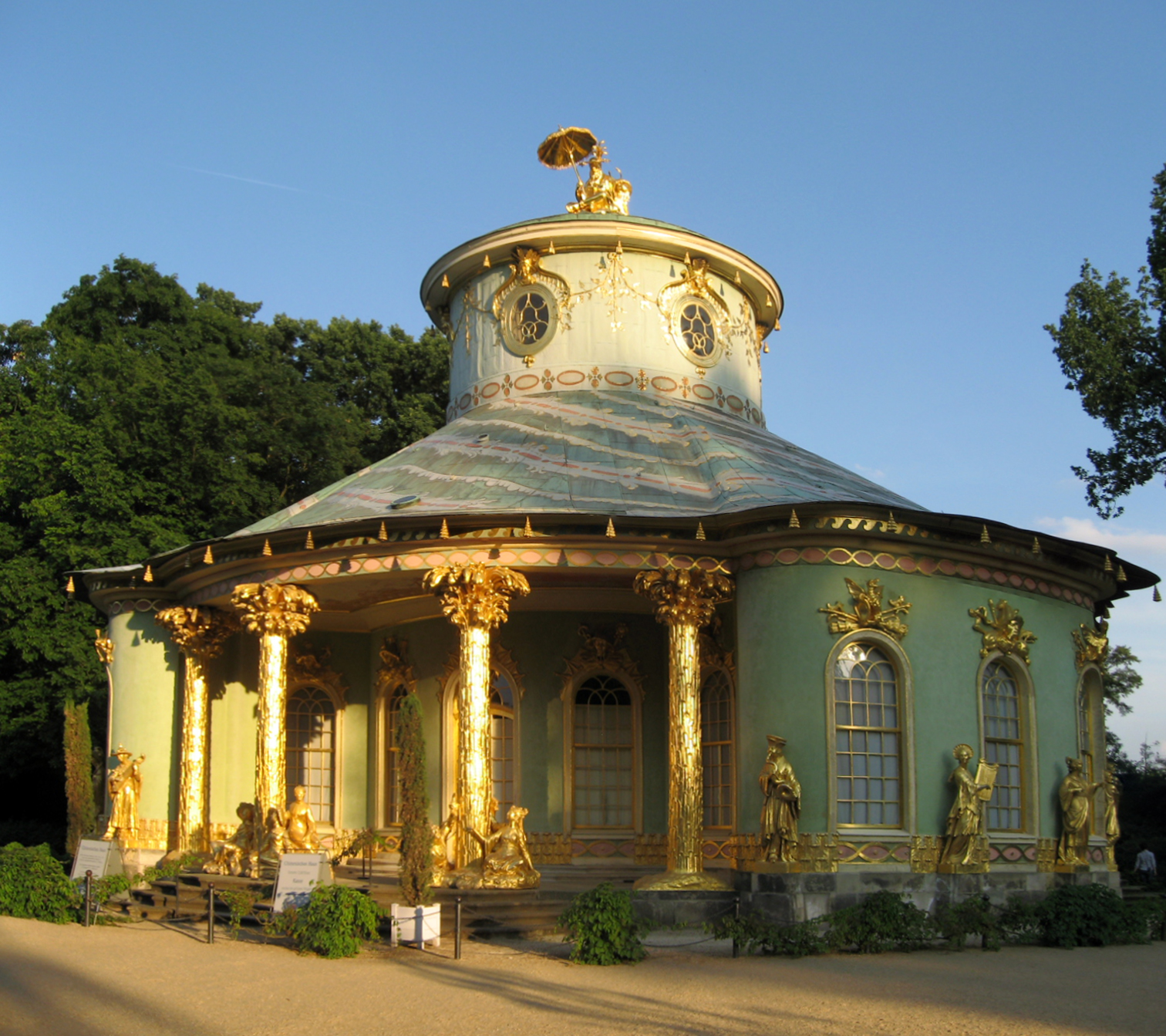
Chinese House

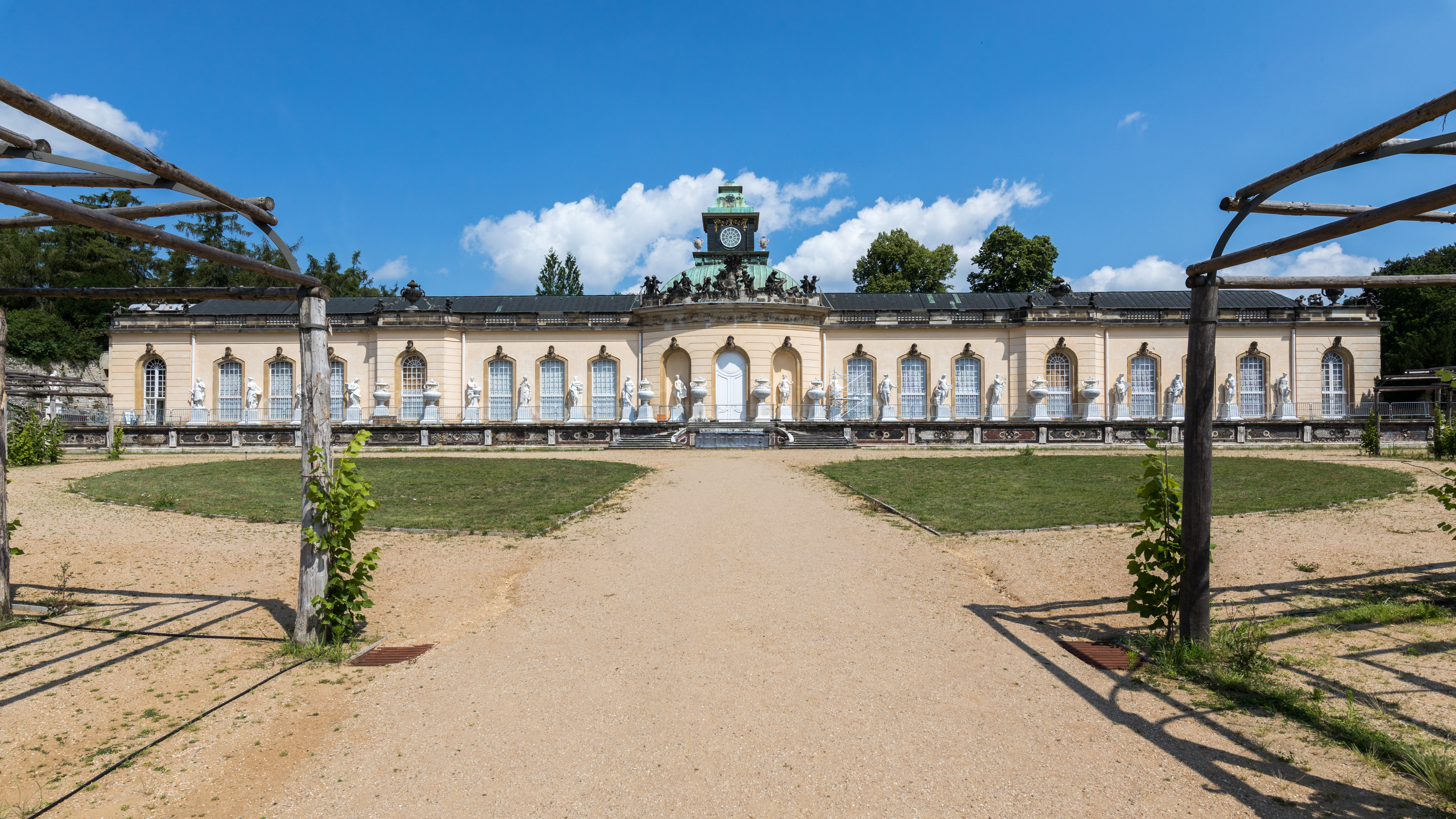
Picture Gallery

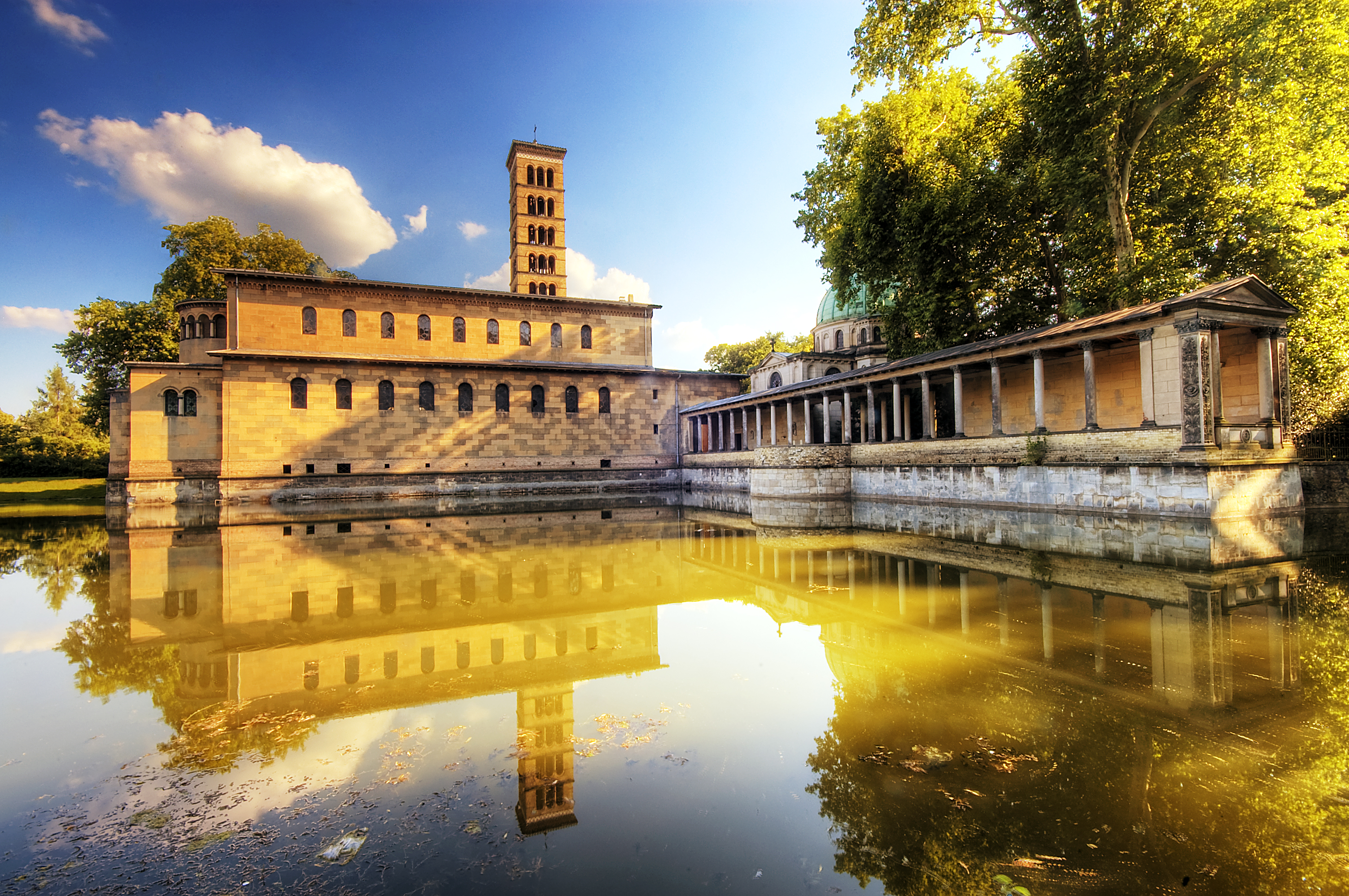
Church of Peace

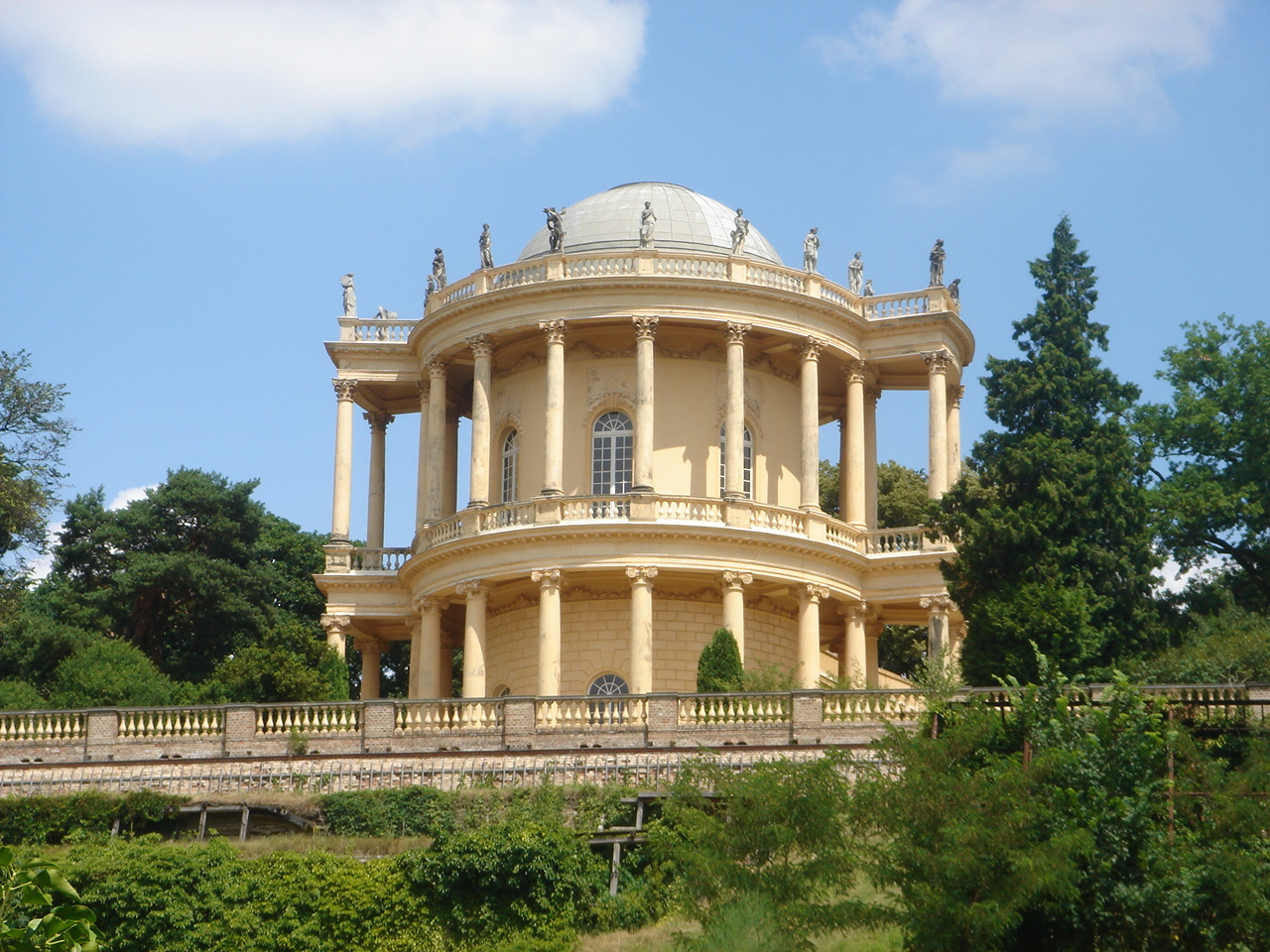
Belvedere on the Klausberg

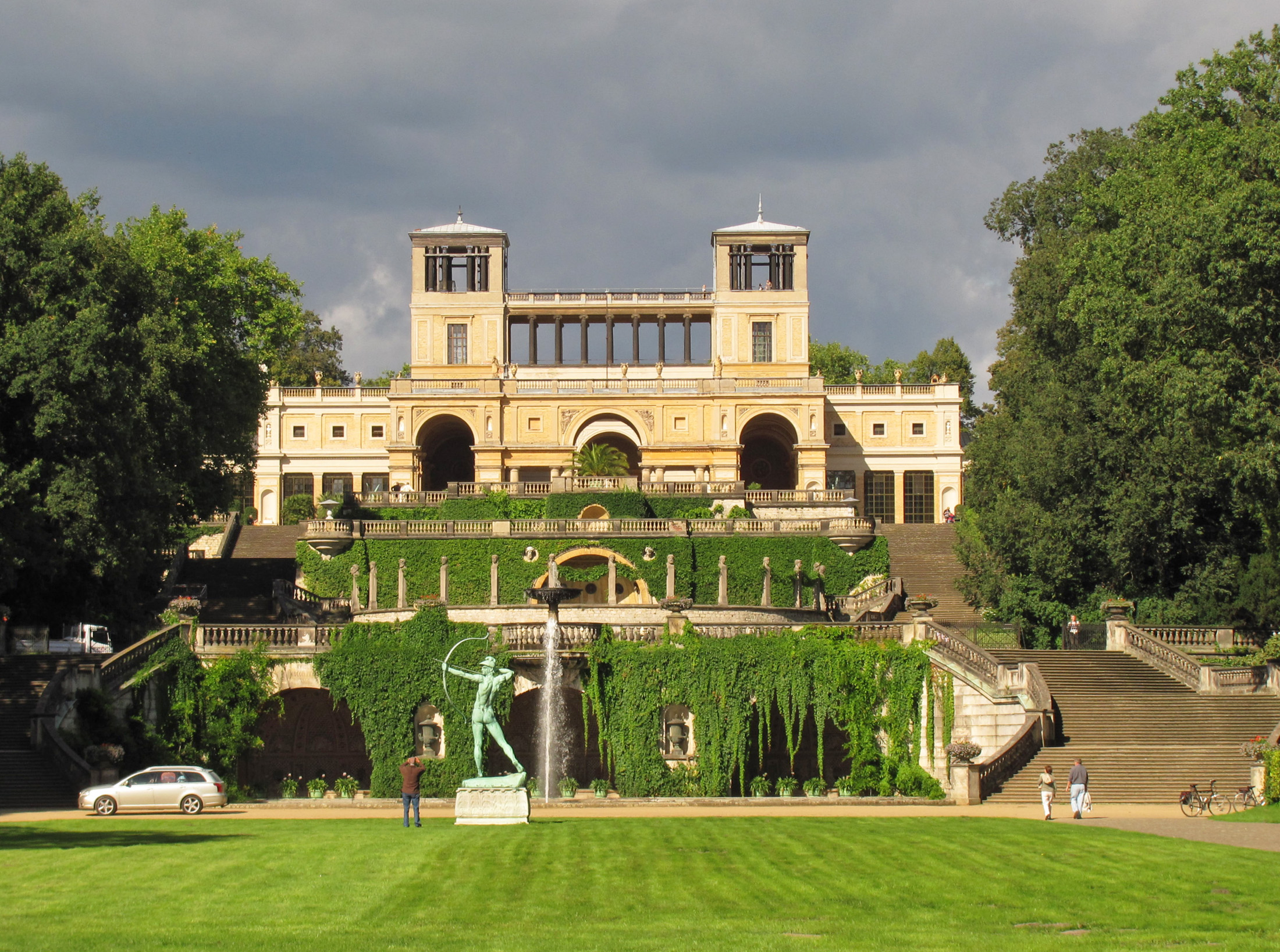
Orangery Palace

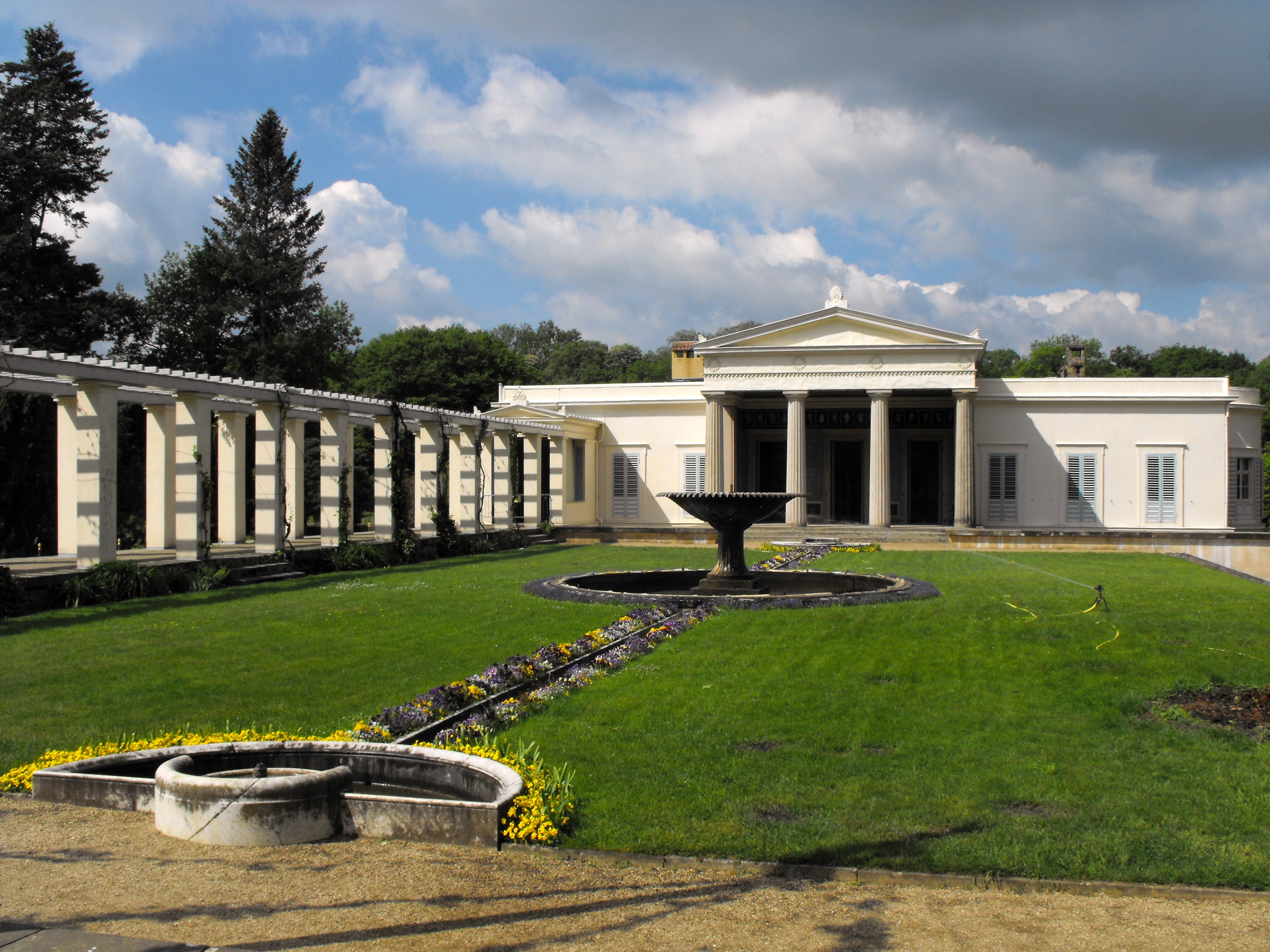
Charlottenhof Palace

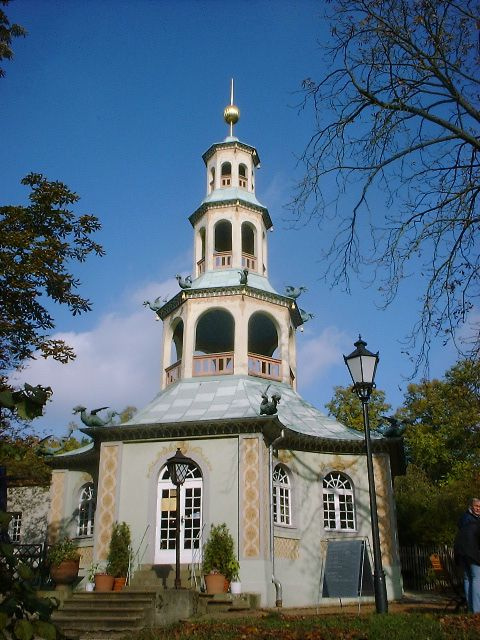
The Dragon House was constructed between 1770 and 1772 in the Chinoiserie style on the northern edge of Sanssouci Park.

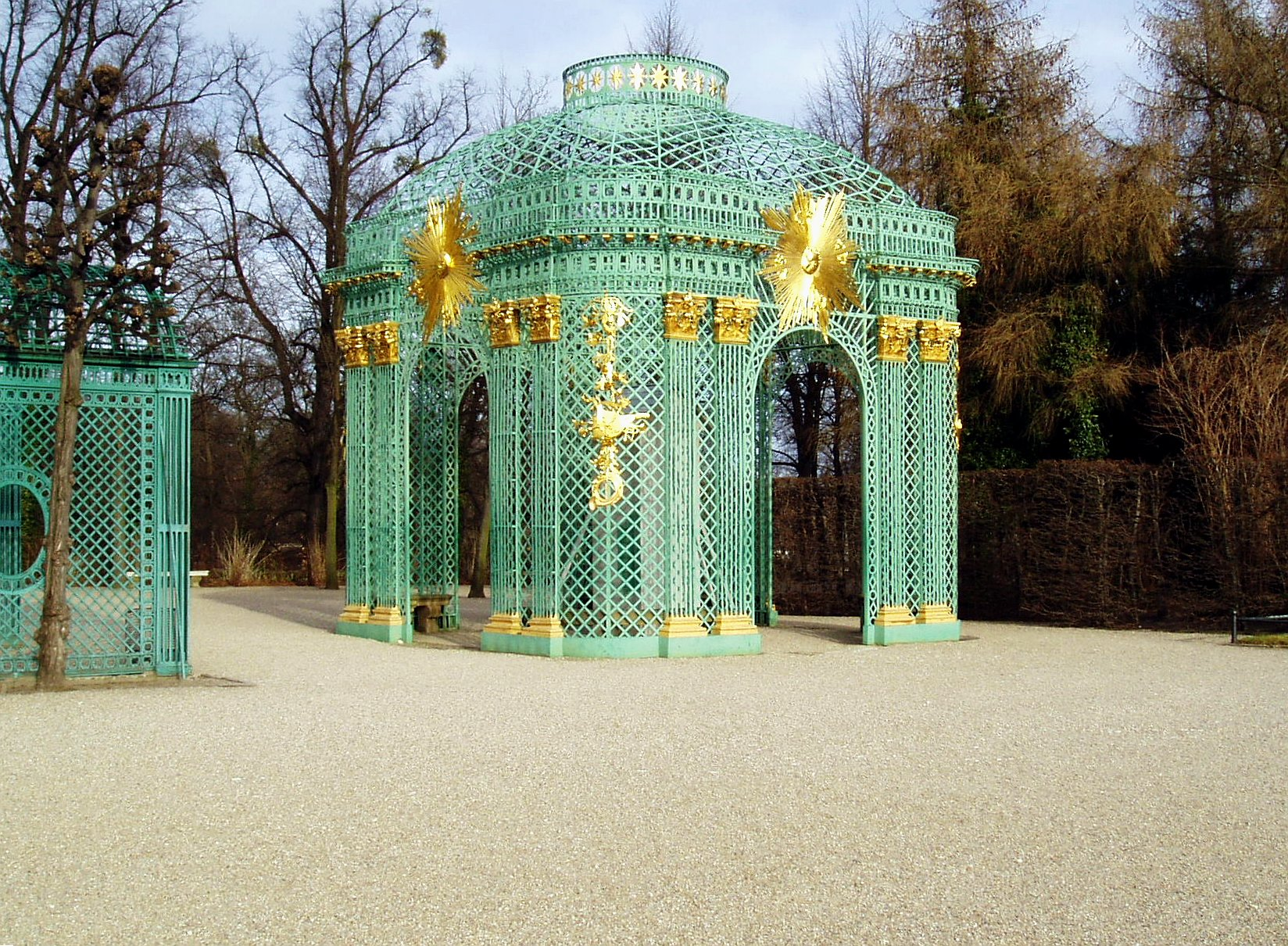
A trellised gazebo at Sanssouci.

== Sources ==
- Paul Sigel, Silke Dähmlow, Frank Seehausen und Lucas Elmenhorst, Architekturführer Potsdam – Architectural Guide, Dietrich Reimer Verlag, Berlin 2006, ISBN 3-496-01325-7.

== See also ==
- Sights of Potsdam
