= Obelisk (Sanssouci) =

Coordinates: 52°24′09″N 13°02′36″E

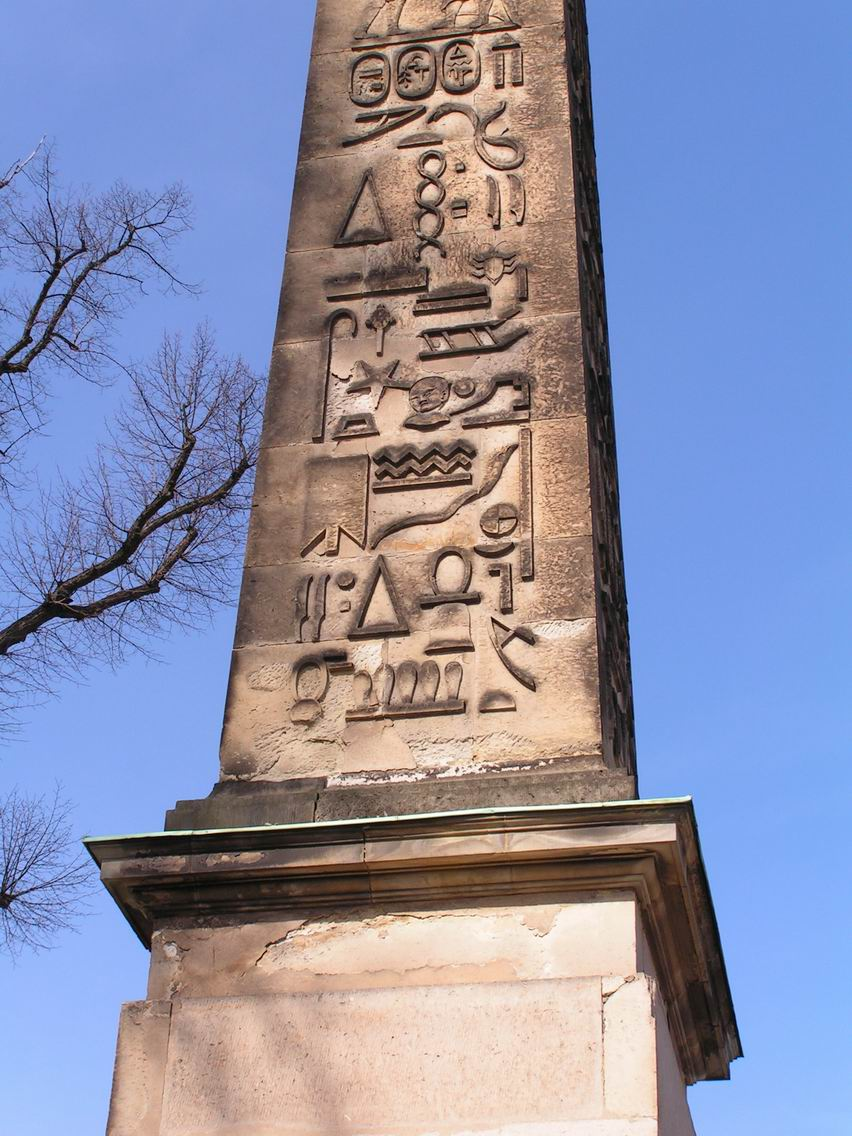
The intricate fake hieroglyphs

The Obelisk entrance (German Obeliskportal) constitutes the eastern limit of Sanssouci Park in Potsdam, Germany. Following plans by Georg Wenzeslaus von Knobelsdorff, Frederick the Great ordered in 1747 that this exit from the park be built.

The New Palace, built at a later date, stands in the line of sight of the entrance; the two are connected by the roughly 2 km long main alley.

Two sandstone statues from the workshop of the sculptor Friedrich Christian Glume stand next to the pillars positioned in a square, right and left from the lower gateway to the park. Flora, the goddess of flowers, and Pomona, the goddess of fruit, draw attention to the fusion of the ornamental and kitchen garden styles in the park.

The obelisk entrance was used in Frederick's time solely as an exit from the park. This is the reason that the figures look into the interior of the park, so that they can say farewell to the guests.

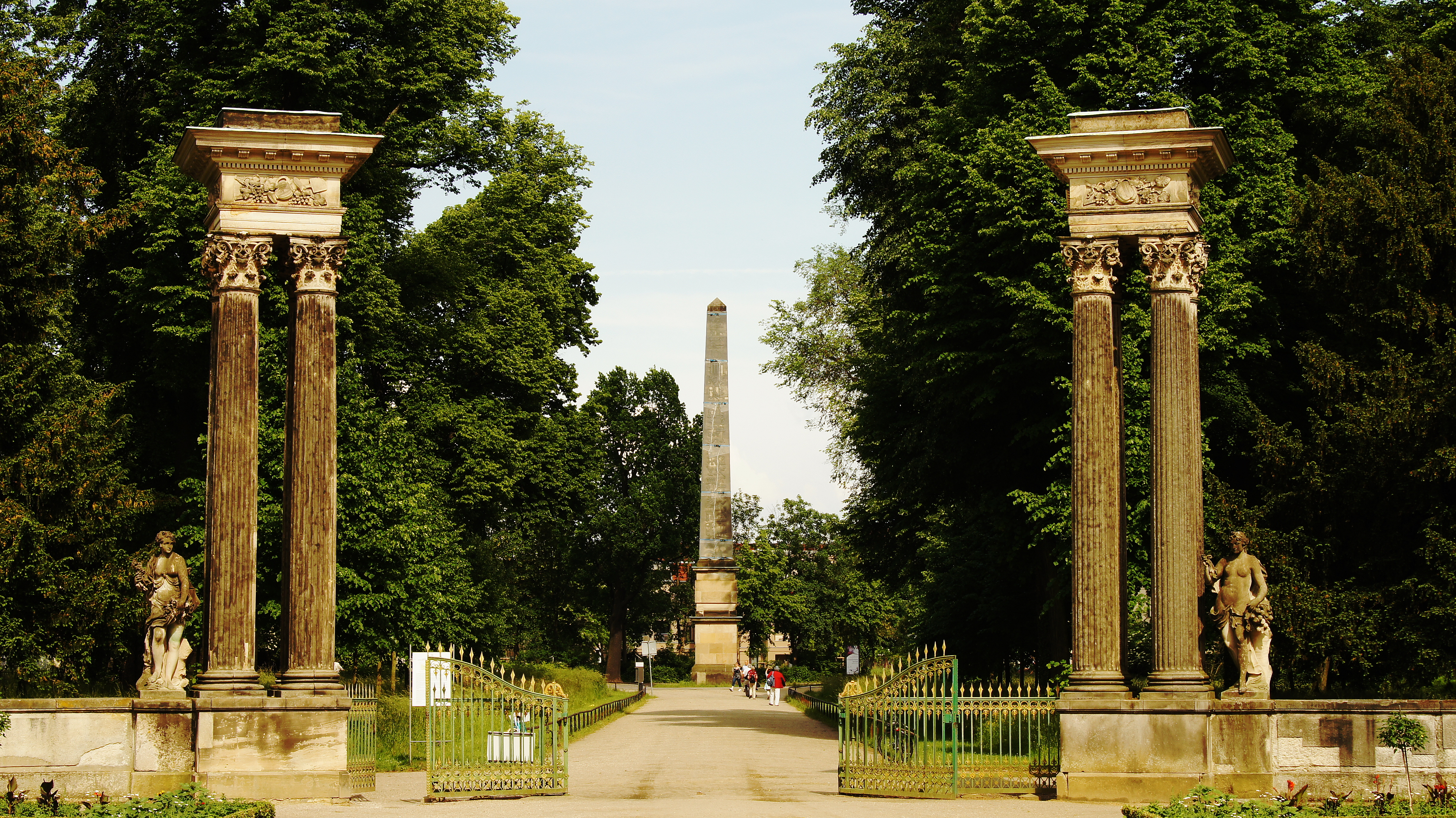
A view through the entrance

The name of the palace is written a few steps beyond the obelisk. Likewise sketched by von Knobelsdorff, it indicates the boundary of Sanssouci Park.

The decorative hieroglyphs were created by the obelisk's designer based on the look of ancient Egyptian Hieroglyphic writing, but contain no text, as it would be some years before the 1822 discovery of the Rosetta Stone led to the ability to interpret the meaning of the pictograms.
