= Green Gate, Potsdam =

Gateway in Potsdam, Germany

Coordinates: 52°24′1.5″N 13°2′37.6″E

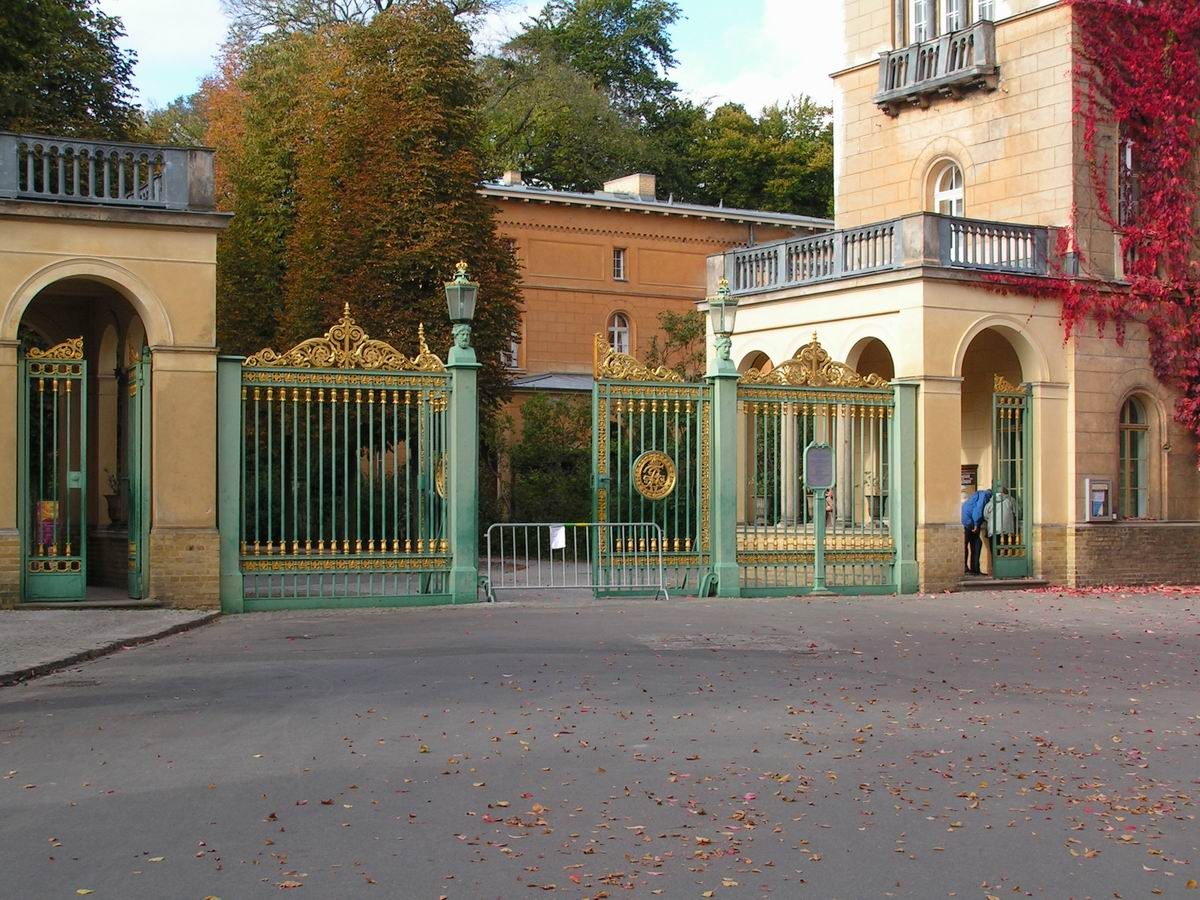
Entrance to the park

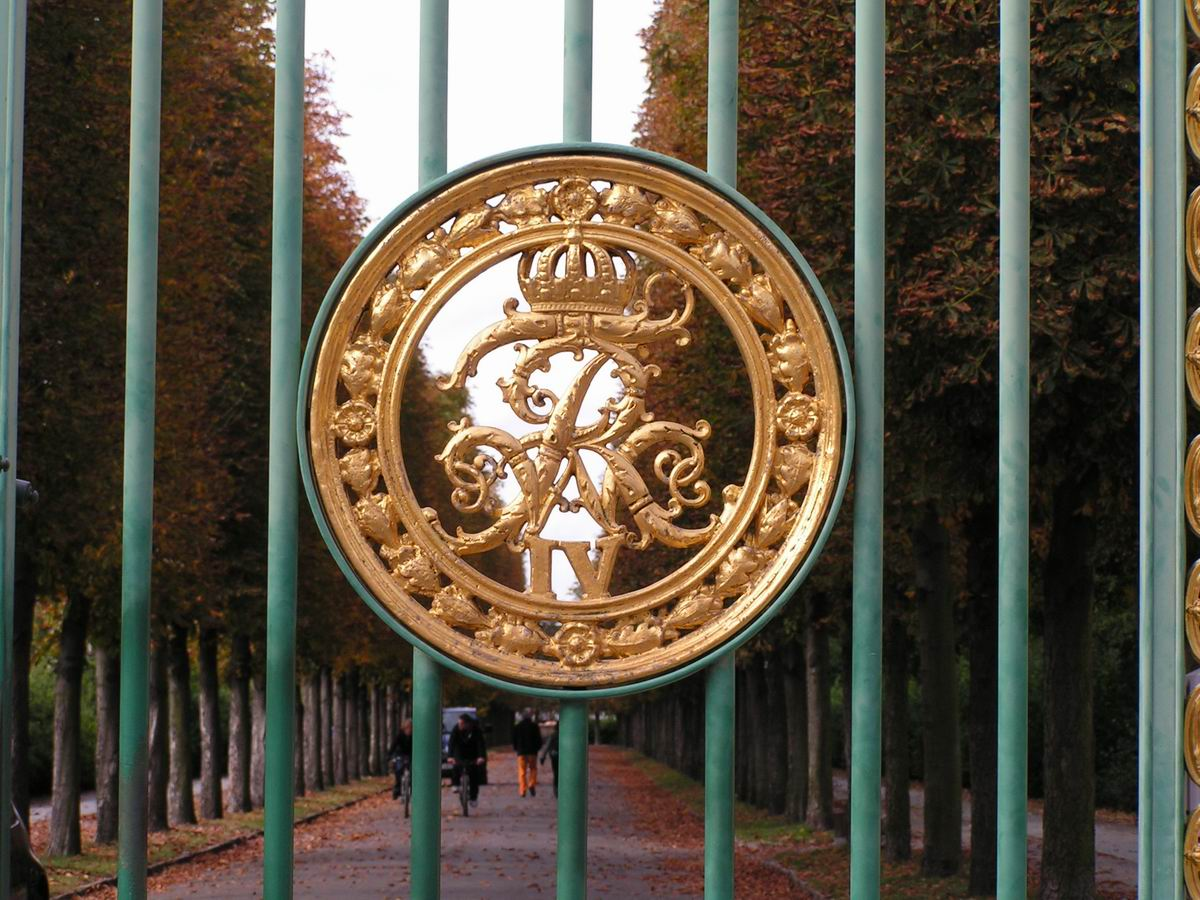
Detail

The Green Gate (German: Grünes Gitter) in Potsdam is the main gateway into Sanssouci Park and is situated at the end of the avenue to Sanssouci Palace. This begins as one of three roads that radiate from the Luisenplatz square. The gate was designed by Ludwig Ferdinand Hesse and was put up in 1854 as part of the construction of the Church of Peace. Its name comes from the colour in which the gate was painted. Additional ornamentation is provided by individual bars and points being picked up in gold leaf. The iron gate bears the initials of Frederick William IV.
