= New Chambers (Sanssouci) =

Museum in Potsdam, Germany

UNESCO World Heritage Site
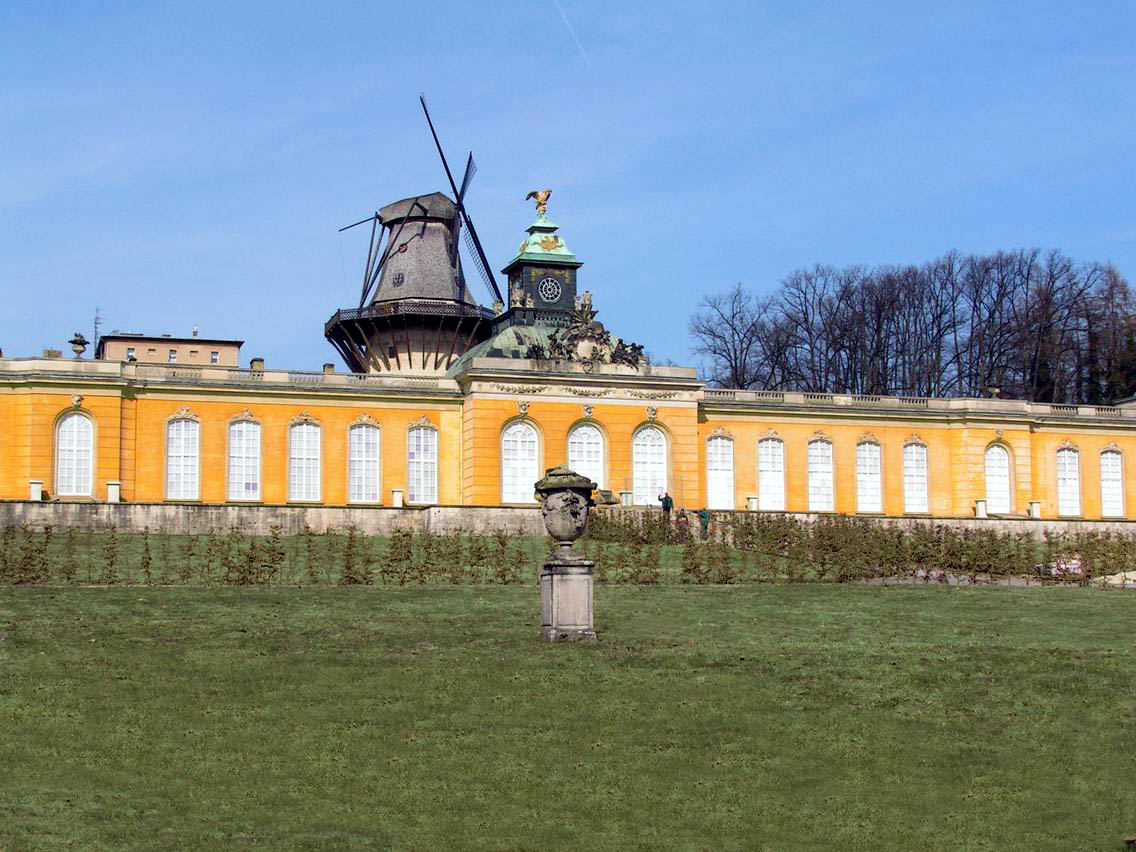
- The south side of the New Chambers

- Location within Brandenburg Location within Germany
- Interactive map of New Chambers
- Location: Potsdam, Germany
- Part of: Palaces and Parks of Potsdam and Berlin
- Criteria: Cultural: (i)(ii)(iv)
- Reference: 532ter
- Inscription: 1990 (14th Session)
- Extensions: 1992, 1999

The New Chambers (German: Neue Kammern) is part of the ensemble of Sanssouci palace in Sanssouci Park, Potsdam, Germany. They were constructed for King Frederick the Great of Prussia from 1771 to 1775.

== History ==
The building, which stands to the west of Sanssouci Palace, serves as a complement to the Picture Gallery, which lies to the east. Both buildings flank the summer palace. The chambers replaced an orangery, which had been built at that site in 1747 on plans by Georg Wenzeslaus von Knobelsdorff and held the terraces' potted plants during the winter months. Ramps, on which the tubs were taken in and out, serve as reminders of the building's original use. Master builder Georg Christian Unger was commissioned to turn the orangery building into a guesthouse.

The building's basic elements were left alone, as were its size and floor-to-ceiling french doors. The most obvious change was the addition of a cupola on the middle section. The similarities between the architecture of the New Chambers and that of the Picture Gallery are such that the two buildings can be mistaken for the other.

== Description ==
=== Interior ===
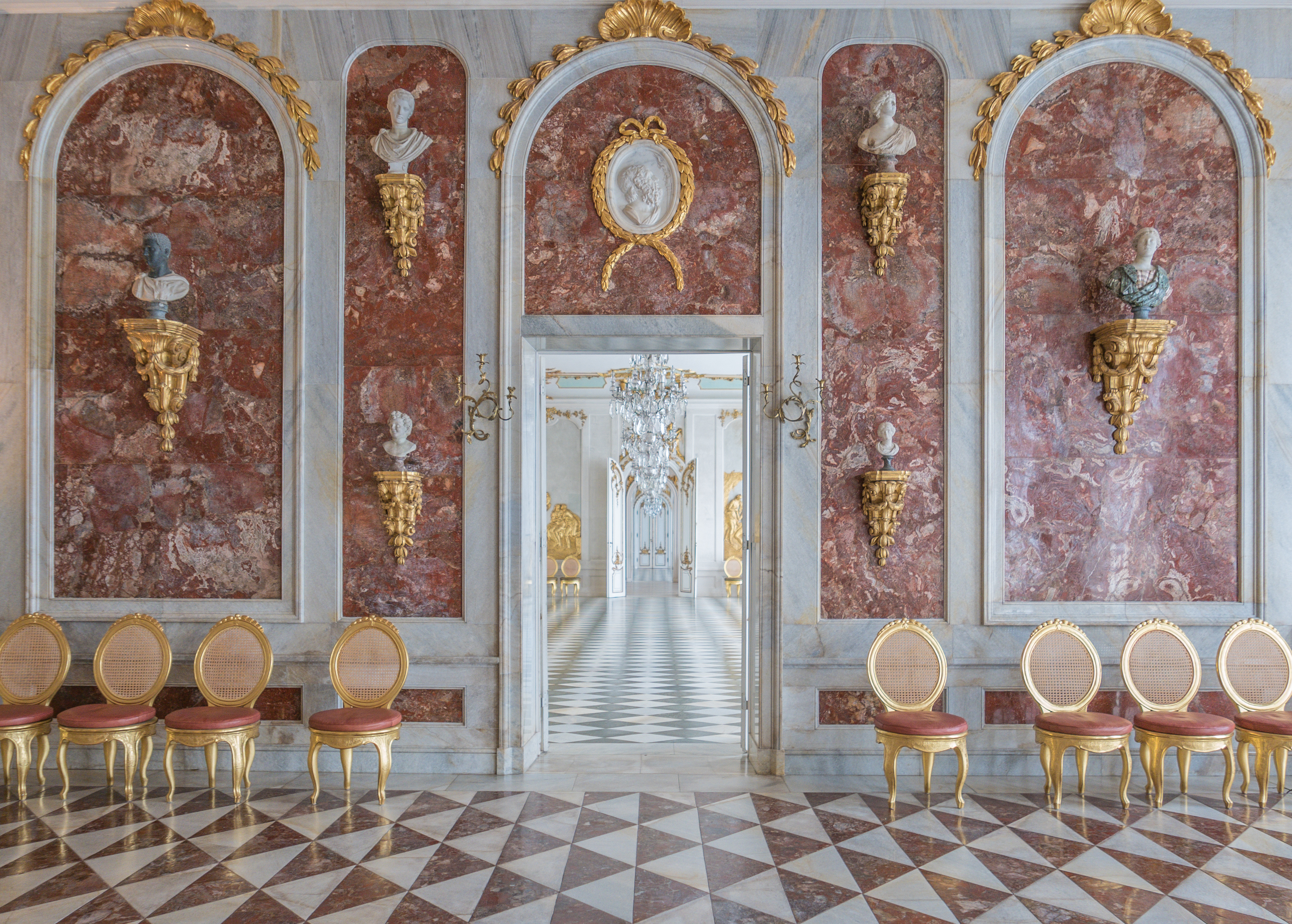
View from the Jasper Room towards the Ovid Gallery

The real alteration occurred in the interior, where seven guest rooms and two ballrooms were created. The building is a highpoint of the late style of Frederician Rococo, even though the Neoclassical style was already largely set as the prevailing taste of the period. The halls were designed by Johann Christian Hoppenhaupt.

The guest rooms were decorated differently with lacquered, painted, or inlaid cabinets, whose costly inlays of native woods decorated the entire wall from the ceiling to the floor.

For paintings, the guest rooms have views of Potsdam, which document the town's design under Frederick the Great and were specially commissioned for the guesthouse by the king.

=== The Jasper Room ===
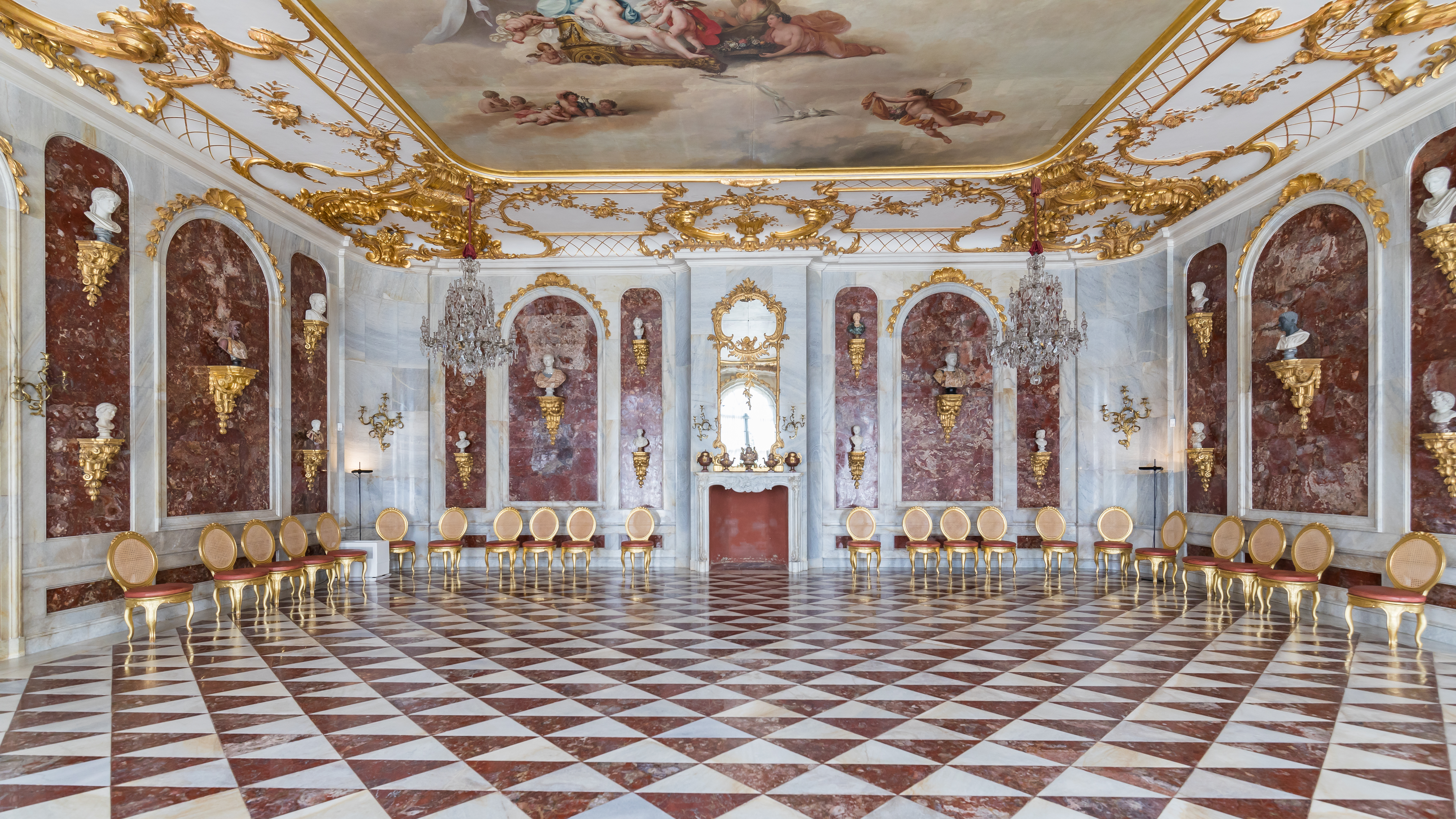
The Jasper Room

In the middle of the building, under the cupola, lies the largest room, the Jasper Room. The ballroom's walls are decorated with red jasper and grey Silesian marble. The same colors are found in the floor design. The ceiling painting Venus mit ihrem Gefolge (Venus with her Retinue) was created by Johann Christoph Frisch. Decorated panels from both antiquity and the 18th century were attached to the background of red jasper.

=== The Ovid Gallery ===
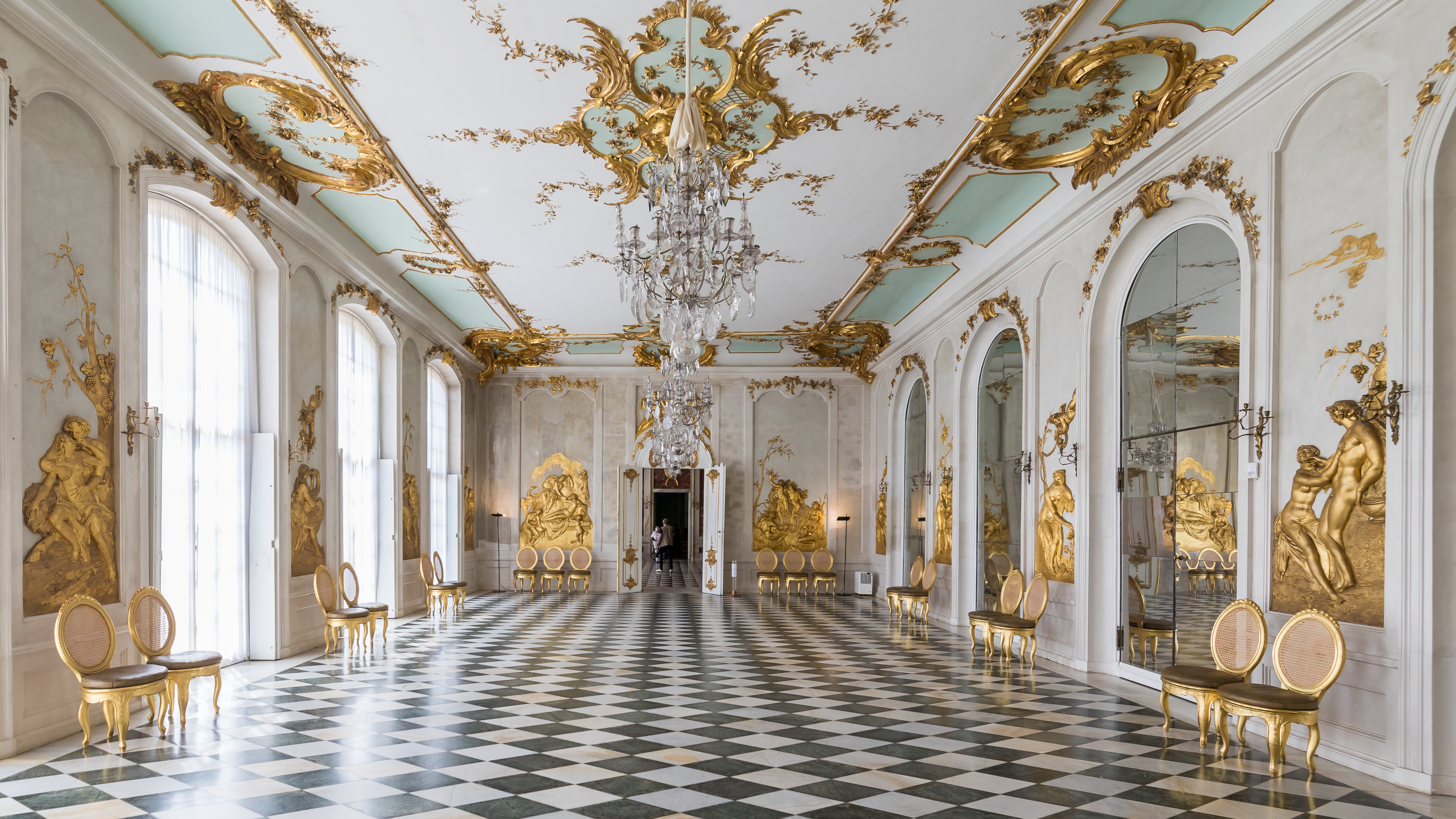
The Ovid Gallery

The second, large ballroom, located in the eastern part of the New Chambers is the Ovid Gallery, decorated in the style of French mirrored rooms.

On the long side of the room is a mirror stretching almost to the ceiling, across from which, on the garden side, are French doors.

Frederick asked for the walls to be decorated with gilded reliefs of the liaisons of the ancient gods, which had been told of by the Roman poet Ovid in his Metamorphoses. The room's rich decoration comes from the workshop of the sculptors and brothers Johann David Räntz and Johann Lorentz Wilhelm Räntz.

== Selected collection highlights ==
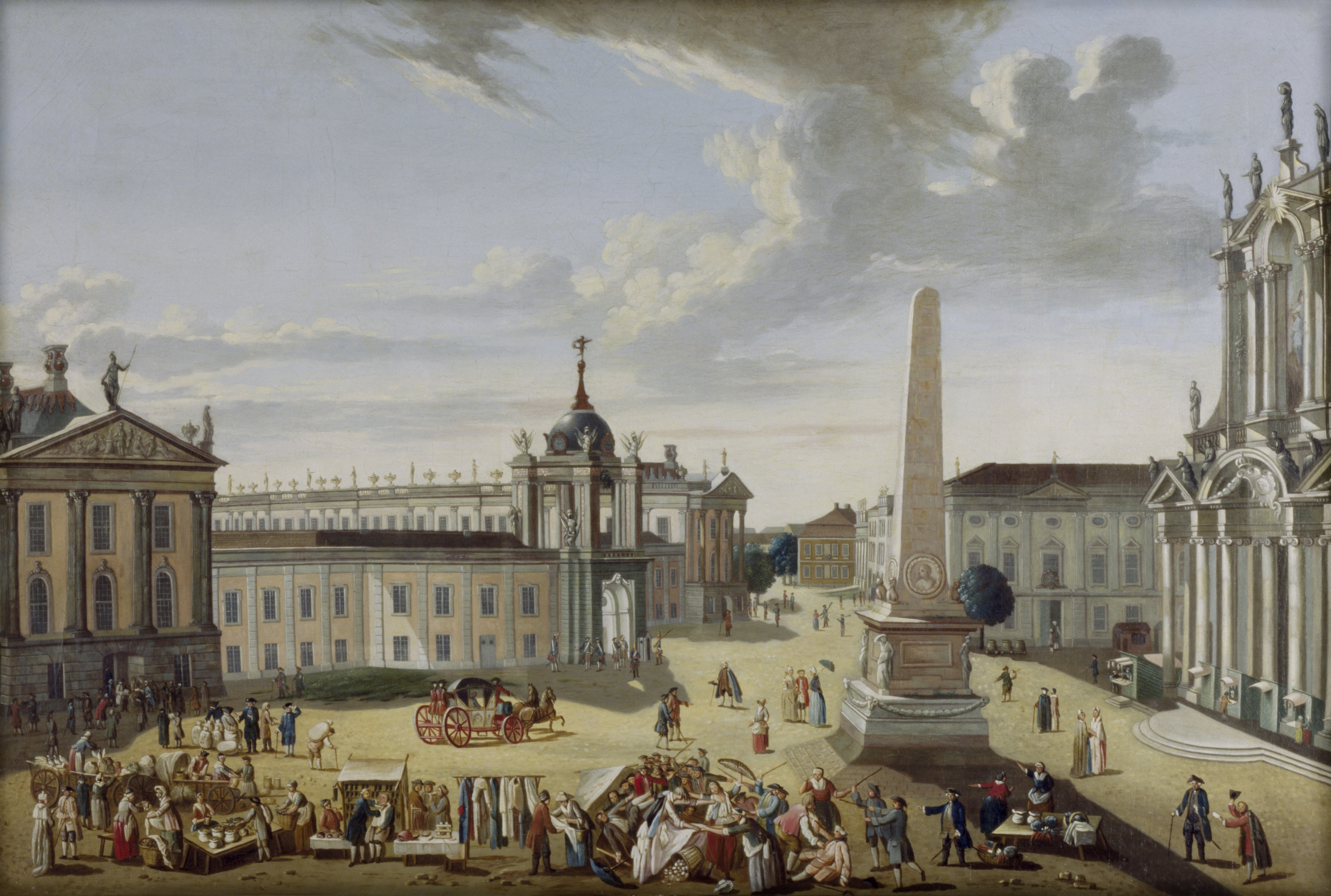
Karl Christian Wilhelm Baron

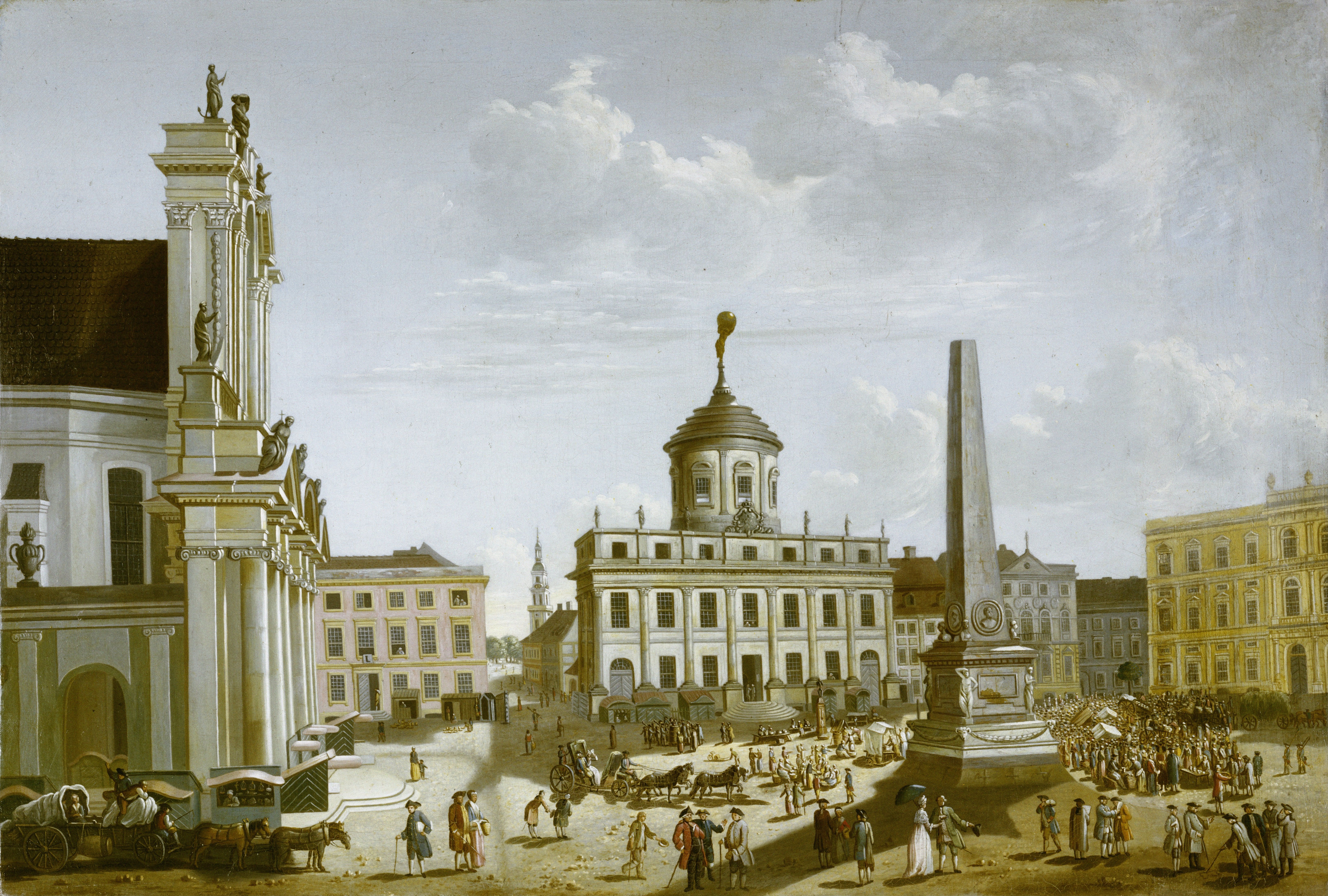
Karl Christian Wilhelm Baron

== World Heritage Site ==
Since 1990 the palace and garden of Sanssouci including the New Chambers has been a UNESCO World Heritage Site, called Palaces and Parks of Potsdam and Berlin.

== Additional reading ==
- Adelheid Schendel, Jerzy Prrzytański: Die Neuen Kammern im Park Sanssouci. Potsdam-Sanssouci 1987
- Gert Streidt, Klaus Frahm: Potsdam. Die Schlösser und Gärten der Hohenzollern, Könemann Verlagsgesellschaft mbH, Köln 1996 ISBN 3-89508-238-4
