= Belvedere auf dem Klausberg =

Building in Sanssouci Park in Potsdam

Coordinates: 52°24′25″N 13°01′09″E

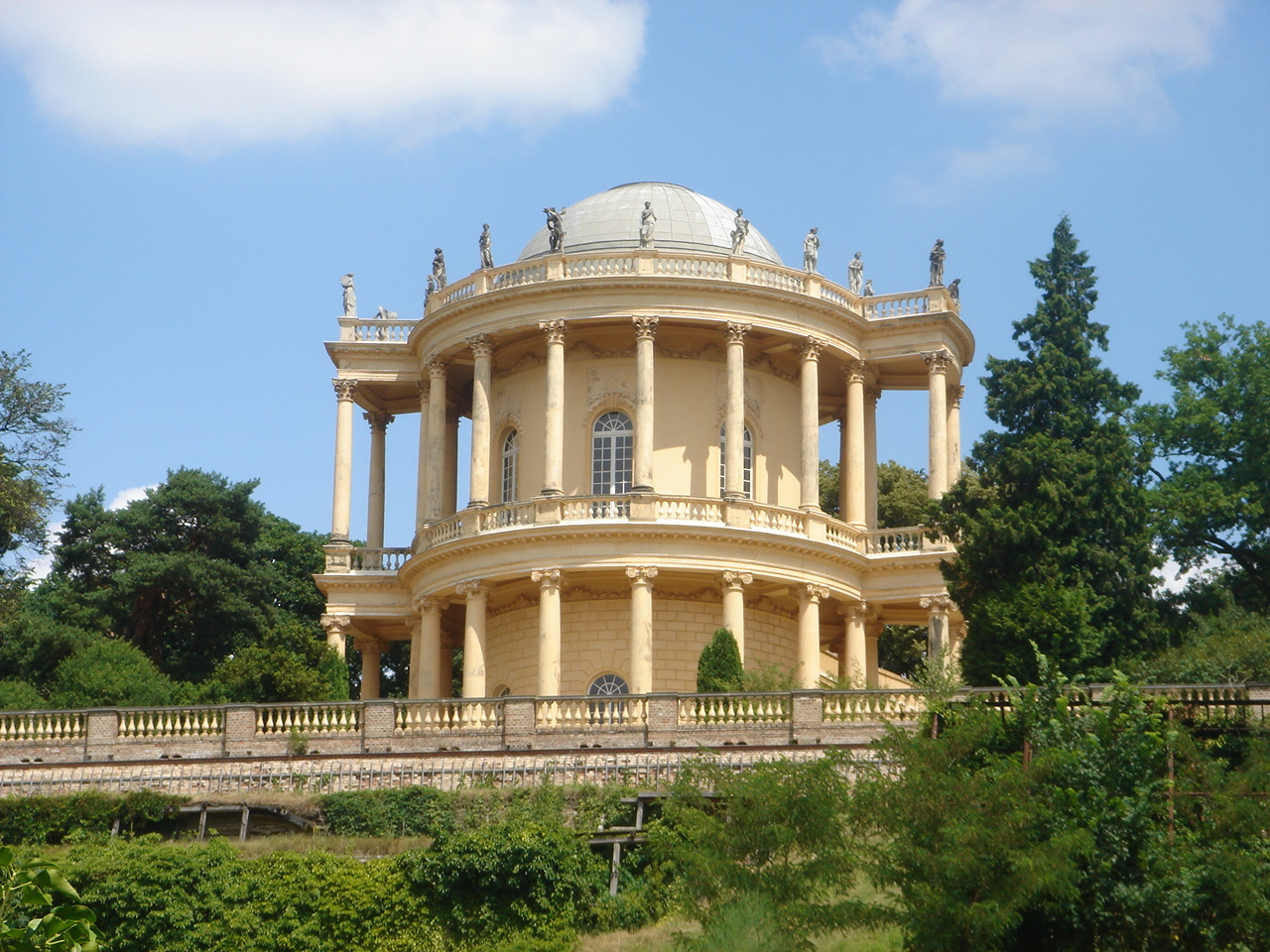
Belvedere on the Klausberg

The Belvedere auf dem Klausberg is a building in Sanssouci Park in Potsdam, Germany erected in 1770–72 using Georg Christian Unger's plans.

== Architecture ==
Georg Christian Unger based his plans on a drawing by the Italian archeologist Francesco Bianchini from his 1738 volume Del Palazzo de' Cesari. Biancini had tried to reconstruct the Imperial Palace on the Palatine Hill in ancient Rome. The only sources he used were ancient writers, parts of the ruins, and an inscription of a building with fountains on a coin he found in the Nero-erected market marcelum magnum in Rome. The ancient gold piece shows an enclosed room, an open rotunda with a vaulted ceiling, and attached on both sides to open walkways.

=== Exterior structure ===
Like the Fountain temple of the ancients, the Belvedere also has a round floor plan. The enclosed building is surrounded on the lower level by a platform with twenty ionic columns. They are supported in turn with twenty corinthian columns on the upper level. This column ring opens to the west and to the east through balcony-like attachments.

The dome over the vaulted ceiling is decorated with the statues of twenty figures of divinities made out of sandstone, which were finished in different sculptors' workshops. Through the eight arched french doors, light enters the building's two rooms, one on top of the other. The upper room can only be reached by the stairs, while the lower room has a door between the stairs on the platform.

=== Interior space ===
The lower room has not yet been restored since the destruction of 1945. In the 18th century, its decorations included a walls of white Silesian marble and vases of red jasper between, as well as above, the french doors. The trapezoid-shaped grey marble slabs of the floor formed an eight-pointed star in the center of the room. The star motif from the floor was continued on the vaulted ceiling, where white marble framing the ceiling tapered off in the middle. The room's simple furnishings consisted of 16 carved gilt chairs with red leather seats.

In the upper, restored, room, the walls are covered with soft green marble (celadon), which makes the light shimmer light blue. There are gilt ornaments of plaster bordering the french windows. The parquet floors form trapezoids made up of different kinds of wood. The ceiling, painted by Karl Christian Wilhelm Baron and Friedrich Wilhelm Bock, was covered with clouds and different kinds of birds; it was reconstructed using an old black-and-white photo. Here too the furniture consisted of 16 carved gilt chairs, which had green leather cushions to match the walls.
