= KGB Prison, Potsdam =

Museum in Germany

Coordinates: 52°24′59.3″N 13°3′51.9″E

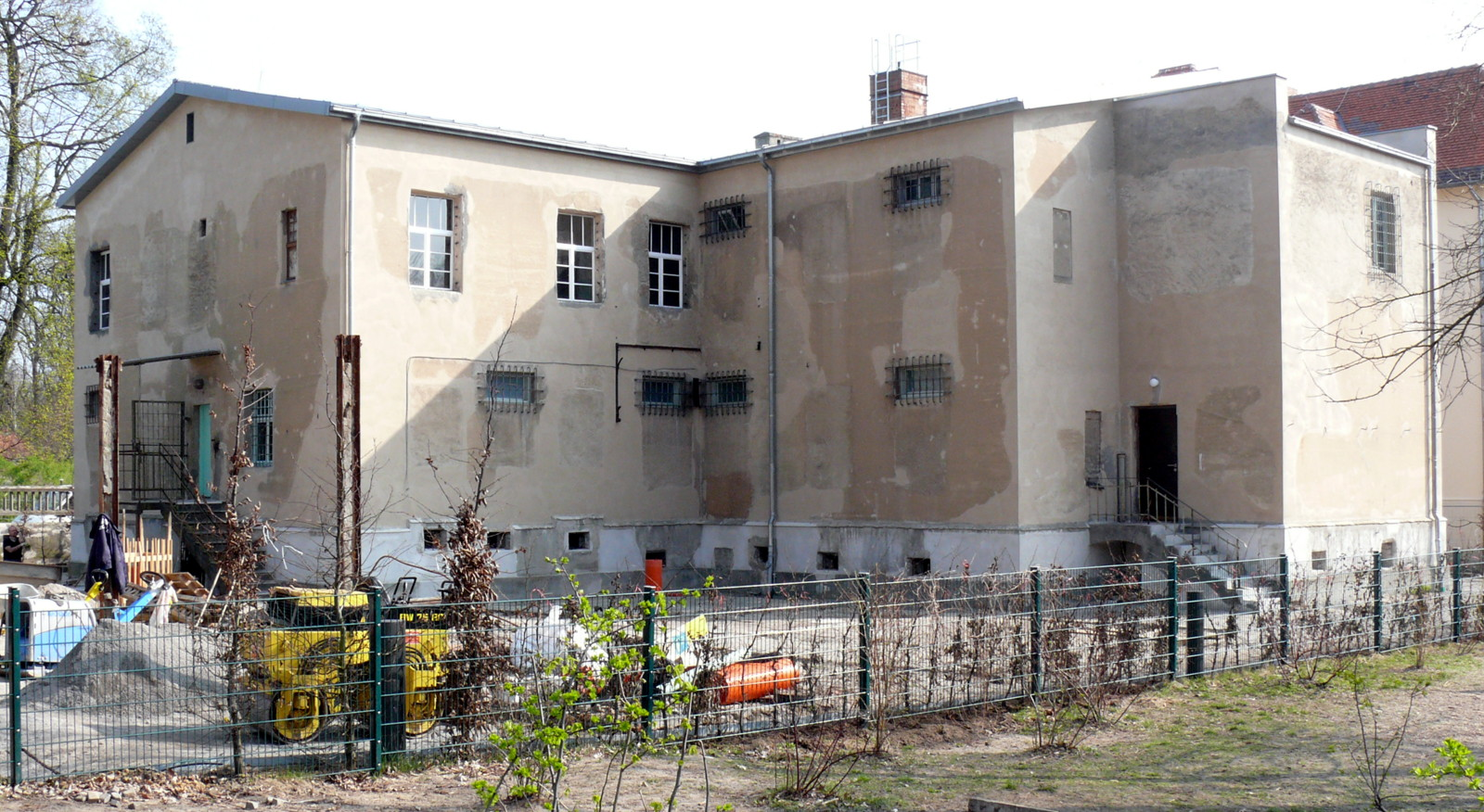
View of the back

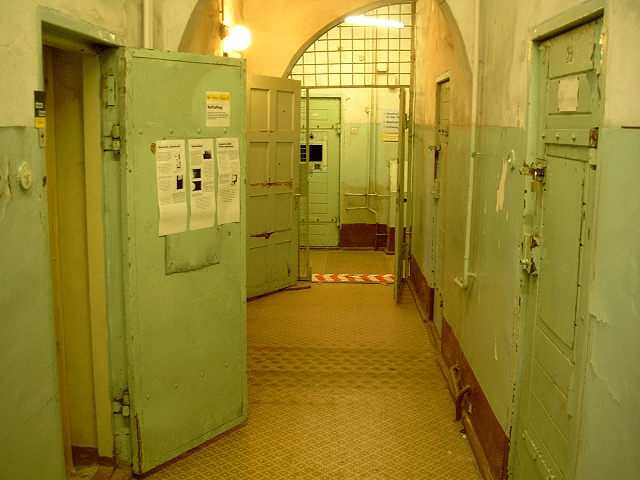
Cell block in the KGB Prison, Potsdam

The KGB Prison at Leistikowstraße 1 in the German city of Potsdam was a detention centre run by the Soviet counter-intelligence organisation, SMERSH. The KGB operated 10 prisons in the Soviet Occupation Zone in Germany after World War 2, imprisoning thousands of people ranging from Nazi's to suspected spies.

== Building ==
The Evangelical Ecclesiastical Benevolent Society (Evangelisch Kirchlichen Hilfsverein) or EKH originally built this structure in 1916–18. After the Potsdam Conference in August 1945 about 100 houses in the Nauener Vorstadt quarter, which bordered on the New Garden, were cordoned off and renamed as Military Camp No. 7 (Militärstädtchen No.7). In this area were located the command center of the KGB for Germany, which was housed in the former boarding school attended by Empress Augusta Victoria. The neighboring building of the women's benevolent society (Leistikowstraße 1, previously Mirbachstraße 1) was used as the counter-intelligence detention center.

== History ==
Following the Soviet occupation of Berlin, the Soviets converted the buildings into a prison by the end of summer 1945. Intended as a prison for Nazi war criminals, by 1947 the goal shifted to imprisoning Soviet political prisoners and suspected western spies. The facility was also responsible for KGB intelligence gathering in the Soviet Occupation Zone in Germany.

Until 1955 Germans were also interned here who were suspected of being active as Werwolf members or of carrying out espionage for the Allied Occupation Powers in the Western Sector of Berlin. Soviet soldiers, who were accused of collaboration, desertion or close contact with the population, were imprisoned here until the mid-1980s. Many inmates were subject to violent interrogation before being sentenced to death or to many years imprisonment and transported to Vorkuta Gulag or other labor camps of the Soviet Gulag system.

At the end of the 1980s the building served as a storehouse. With the withdrawal of the Red Army from Germany it was returned in 1994 to the Evangelical Ecclesiastical Benevolent Society again. After restoration in 2007/2008, a memorial site opened on 29 March 2009, which is open to visitors. A permanent exhibition on the history of the detention prison is available, with the option of booking guided tours. Much of the historic prison is preserved intact. The state of Brandenburg, the Federal Republic of Germany and private donors have put up 2.2 million euros for the memorial site. There is also a traveling exhibit showcasing the purpose of the site originally as the Women's Aid Headquarters.
