= Royal Playhouse (Potsdam) =

Coordinates: 52°23′55″N 13°03′55″E

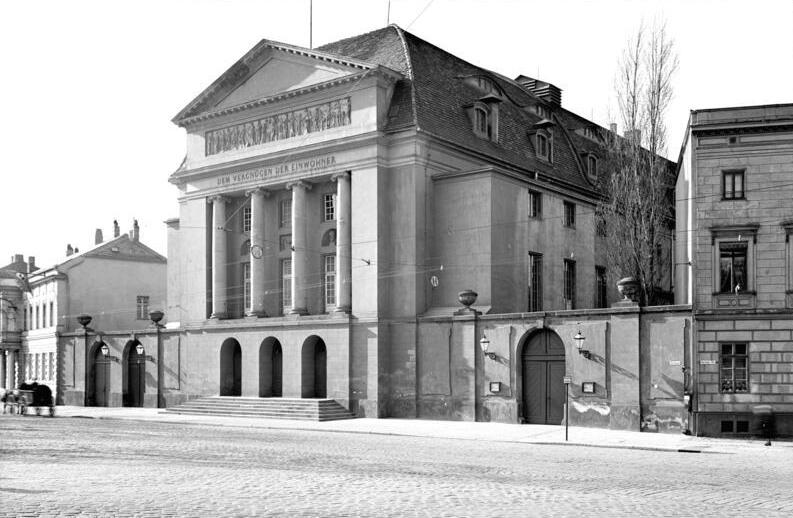
The Royal Playhouse, Potsdam, 1928

The Royal Playhouse (Königliche Schauspielhaus) was a theatre built by Frederick William II of Prussia for the citizens of Potsdam. It was later known as the City Theatre (Stadttheater) and popularly as the Canal Opera House (Kanaloper).

It was located at 8 Am Kanal on the Stadtkanal in the city to designs by Carl Gotthard Langhans or Michael Philipp Boumann in an early Neoclassical style between 1793 and 1796. Boumann was awarded the construction contract. At the end of the Second World War it was destroyed by artillery fire and in 1966 the ruins were demolished to make way for a 17-storey prefabricated apartment building.

== History ==
It had room for an audience of 700 and initially functioned as a venue for the Schauspielhaus Berlin, had no ensemble of its own and was under the artistic direction of the Berlin general management. The programme included plays, operas and ballets – all of them guest performances from Berlin. Since the Potsdam garrison accounted for about a third of the population, military personnel made up a large part of the audience in addition to the middle-class audience.

From 1846 onward, the theatre was run by private tenants and directors with their own ensembles. Plays and operas were shown, as well as comedy and much trivial entertainment. The business was on shaky ground; the theatre was temporarily closed several times. After the beginning of the First World War, the theatre switched to patriotic productions. After the German Revolution of 1918-1919, the state took over the theatre and in 1919 handed it over to a former officer, Kurt Pehlemann, as tenant, head of the theatre and actor. Pehlemann performed popular German classics, entertainment and German nationals.

In 1924 the theatre was transformed into the Potsdamer Schauspielhaus GmbH; Pehlemann became artistic director. Shortly afterward, the theatre was renovated with public money and donations and reduced to 650 seats. For the reopening in 1929, Schiller's Kabale und Liebe was performed. After 1933, the repertoire was changed: In addition to little classical music, they played light fare and National Socialist drama. In 1945, the theatre burned down after heavy artillery fire during the Second World War, and in 1966 the ruins were blown up.

== Former Barracks Playhouse (Schauspielerkaserne) ==
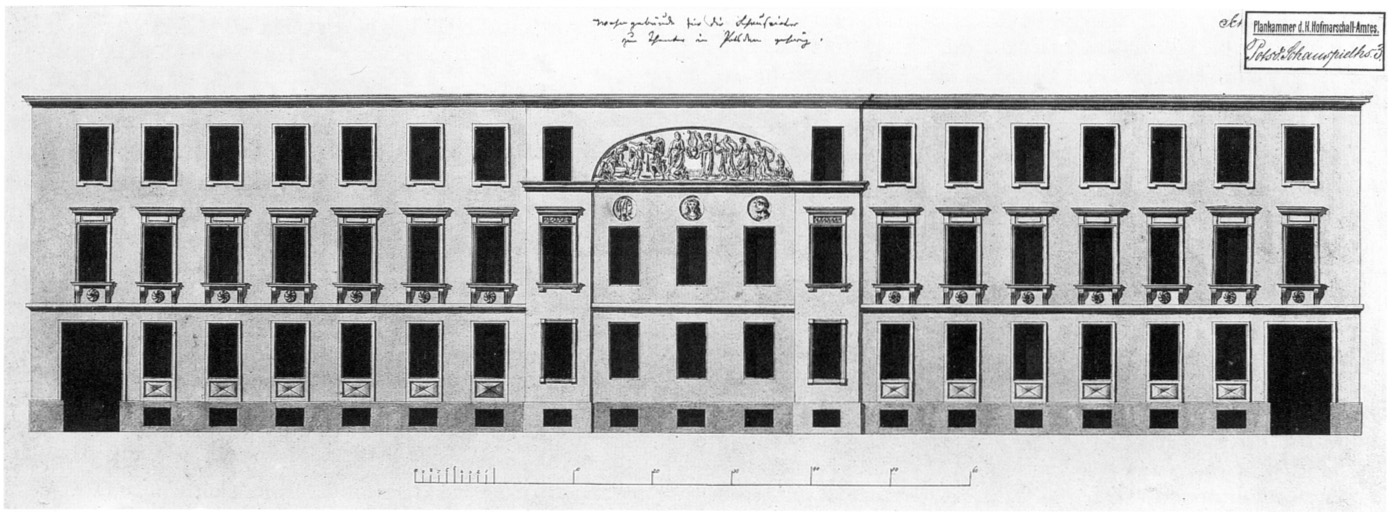
Facade frieze of the 'Schauspielerkaserne', Michael Philipp Boumann, 1796

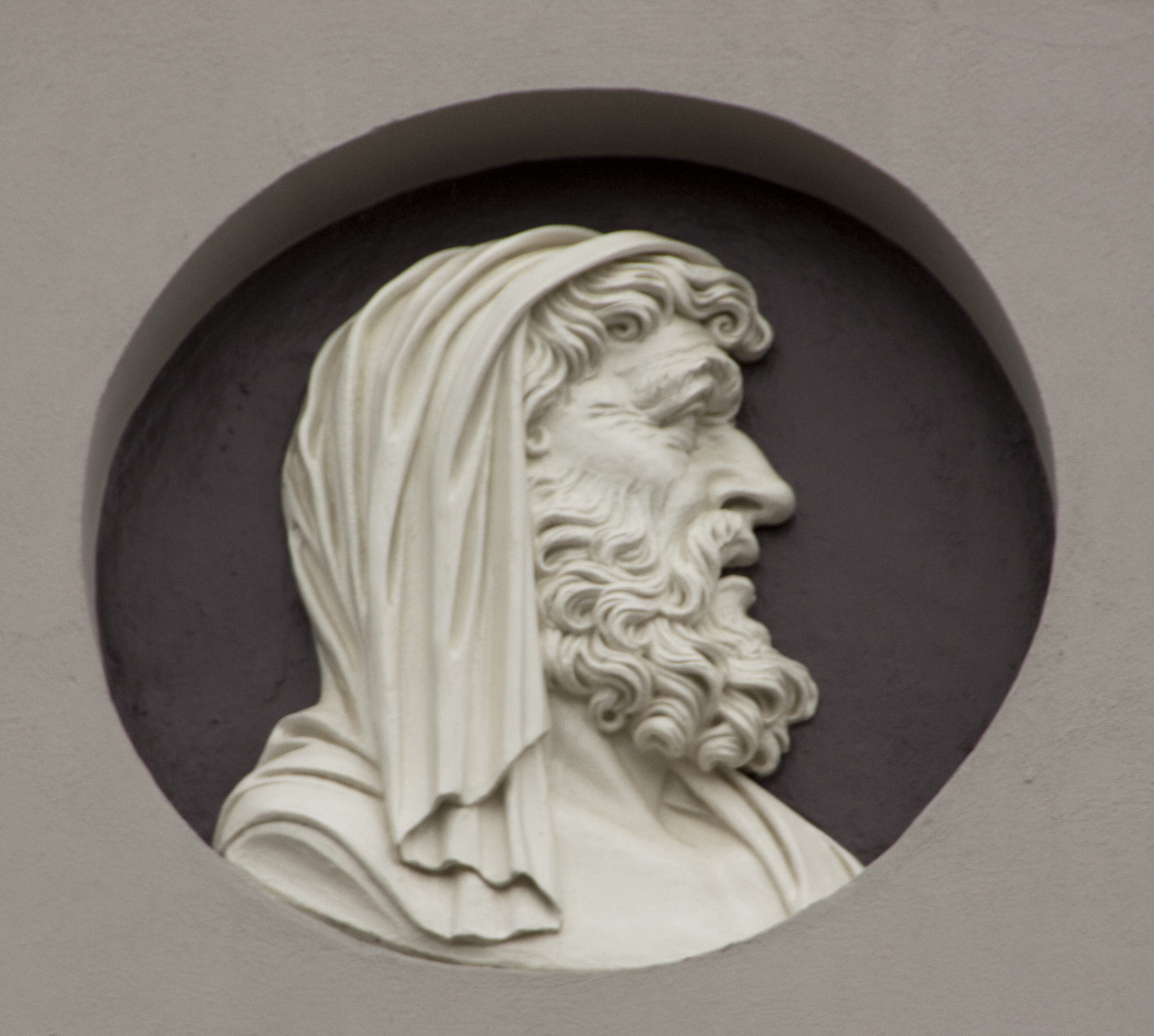
Tragic poet

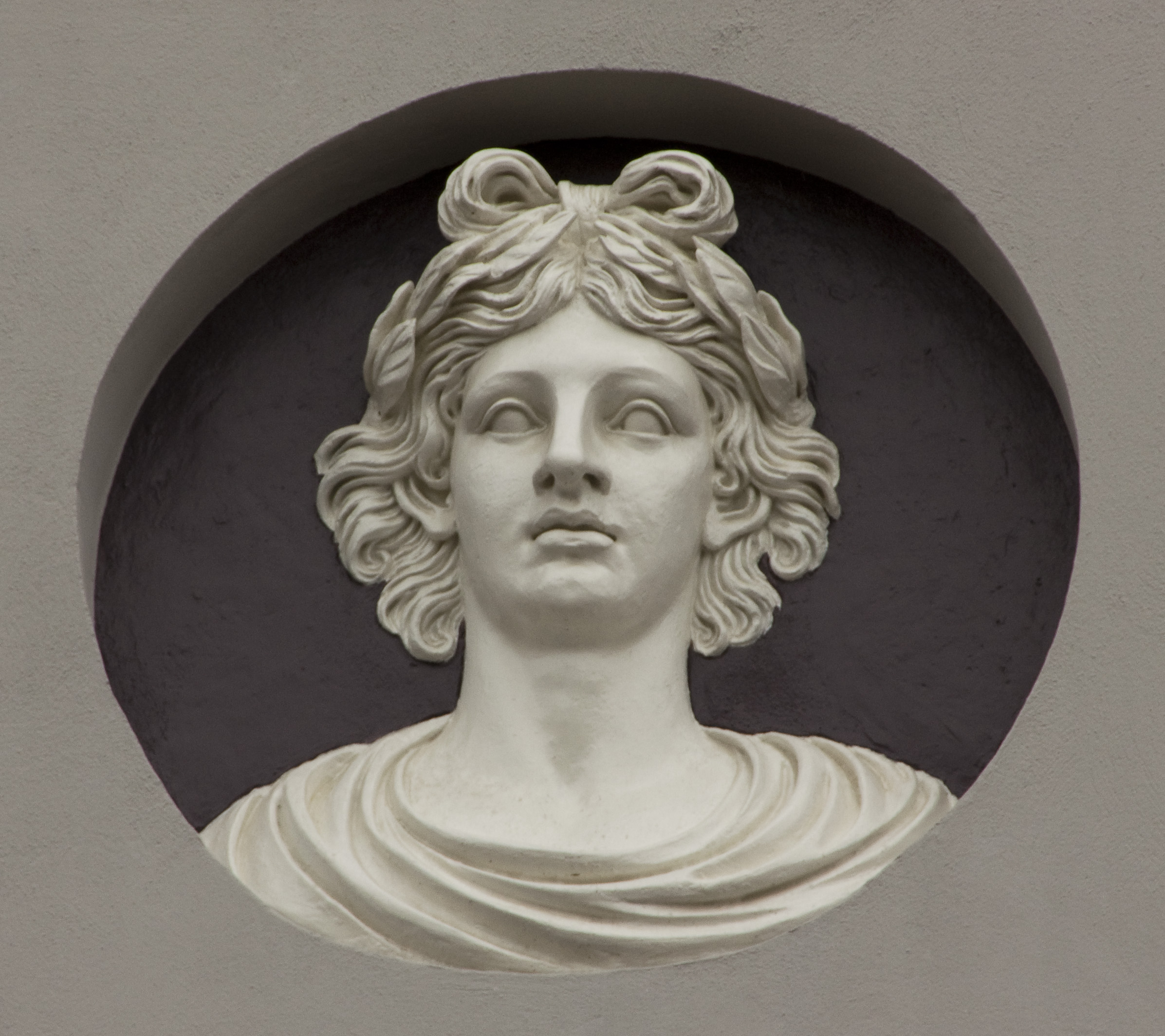
Apollo

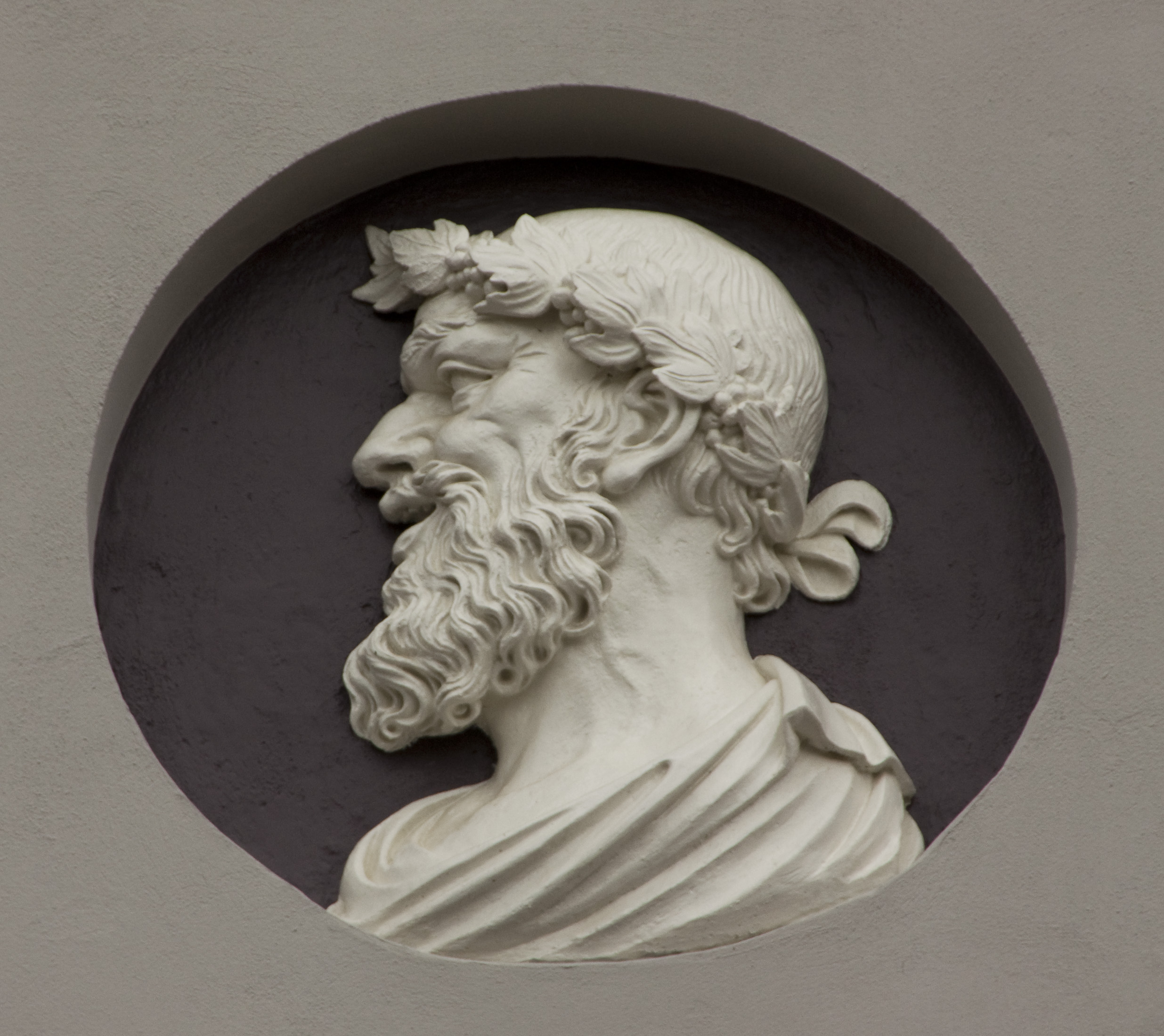
Comic poet

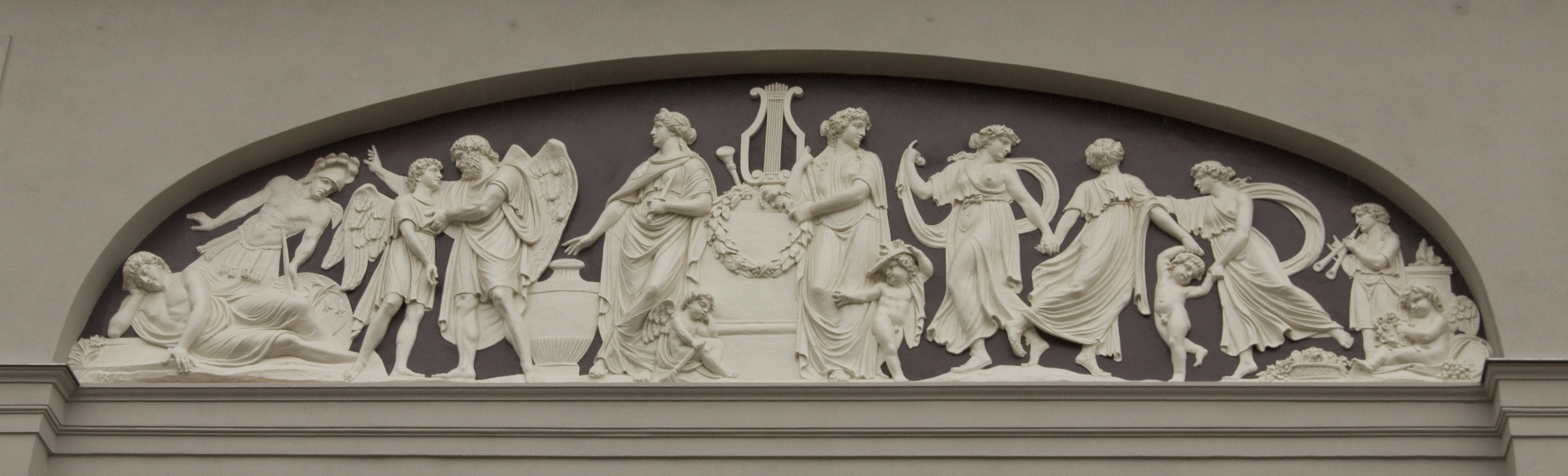
Relief in central section of the arch

== Bibliography (in German) ==
- Rat der Stadt Potsdam (ed.): 1000 Jahre Potsdam. Blätter aus der Stadtgeschichte. Teil I, Potsdam 1987, p. 146 ff
- Waltraud Volk: Potsdam. Historische Straßen und Plätze. 2. Auflage. Verlag für Bauwesen, Berlin 1988, ISBN 3-345-00488-7, p. 204
- Rudolf Genée: Hundert Jahre des Königlichen Schauspiels in Berlin. Nach den Quellen geschildert. Hofmann, Berlin 1886. (Digitalisat)
