= Michael Philipp Boumann =

Michael Philipp Daniel Boumann (22 April 1747 – 2 August 1803) was a German master builder and architect active in the Kingdom of Prussia. His father Johann and brother Georg Friedrich were both also architects. Boumannstrasse in Berlin-Reinickendorf is named after him.

== Life ==
Born in Potsdam, he began his career in 1763 as a construction supervisor at the then-existing building office, later moving to the court building office in Berlin. From 1767 to 1770 he worked as a construction foreman, for example on projects in Quedlinburg. In 1770 he became building inspector for Anna Amalia, Abbess of Quedlinburg and from 1771 onwards as his father's assistant. In 1777 he became assessor to the Oberbaudepartement whilst remaining part of the court building office. In 1778 he became a senior building councillor and in 1787 a senior privy councillor for buildings. In 1794 he was made Senior Privy Councillor for Finance and chief court building inspector.

He was one of the founders of the Berliner Bauakademie (1799) and a leading freemason, taking part in the drafting of a new constitution for German Freemasonry in 1797. In recognition of his contributions, the Grand Master Boumann Foundation was established in 1867. He died in Berlin.

== Selected works ==
- 1767 Anna Amalia's Palace in Berlin, Unter den Linden (renovation, no longer exists today), as assistant to his father
- 1786 Schloss Bellevue in Berlin-Tiergarten
- 1788–1793 Palais Lichtenau in Berlin-Charlottenburg (construction aborted in 1871)
- 1792–1794 Palais Goerne/Lichtenau in Berlin, Unter den Linden (now no longer visible)
- 1793–1794 Schloss Pfaueninsel in Berlin
- 1793–1795 Schauspielhaus in Potsdam (design possibly by Carl Gotthard Langhans)
- 1796–1797 Palais Lichtenau in Potsdam
- 1797 Addition of two single-story side wings to the Marmorpalais in Potsdam

== Designs ==
- 1793 for a Gothic tower and Gothic hall for a Belvedere auf dem Pfingstberg (not built)
- 1796 Plans for the reconstruction of St. Nikolai in Potsdam (collaboration with Friedrich Gilly)

== Gallery ==
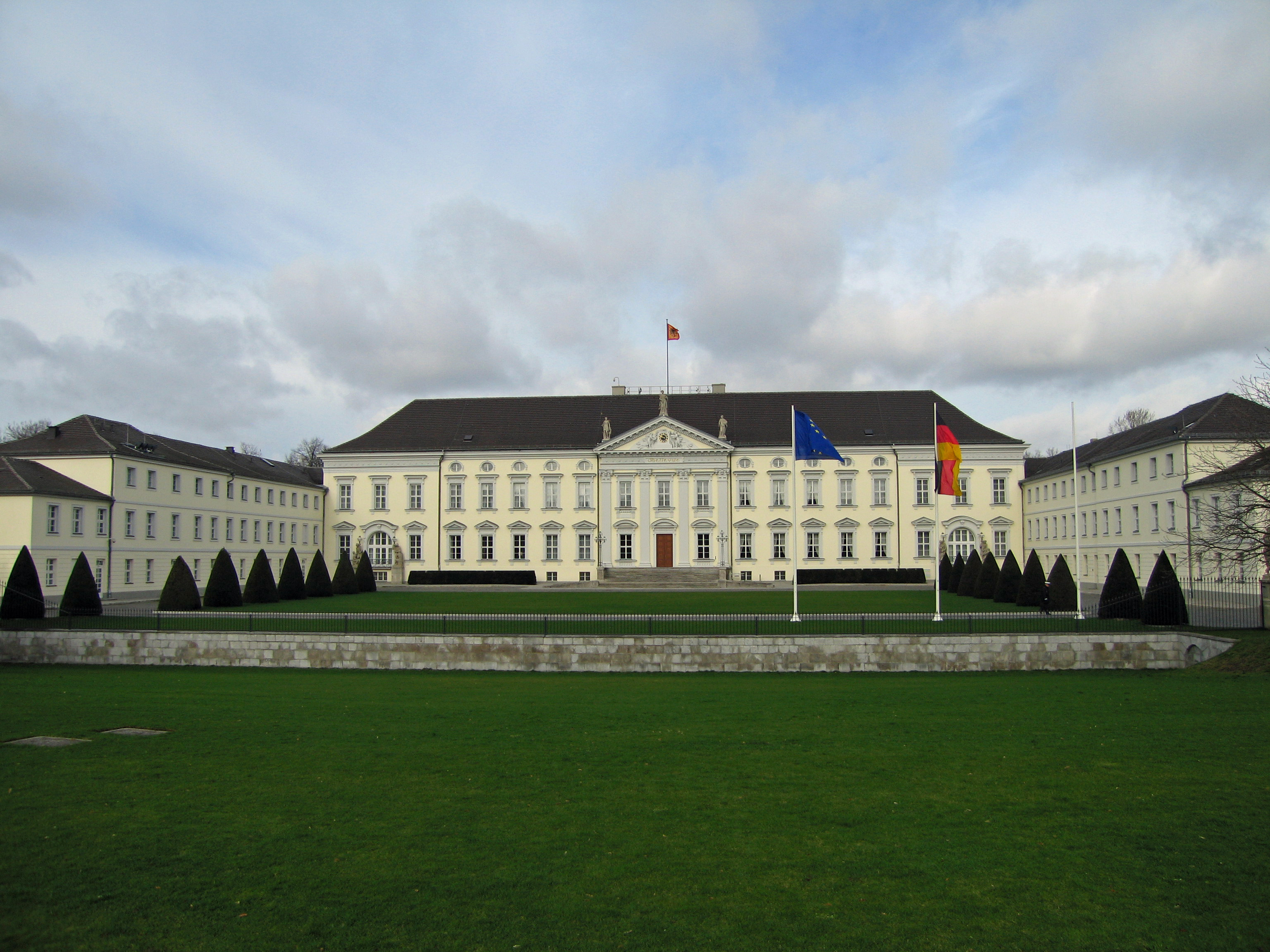
Schloss Bellevue, Berlin

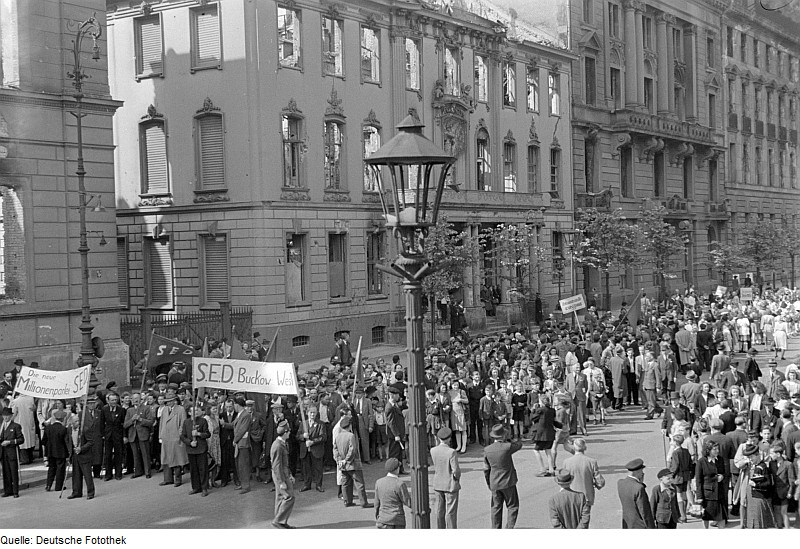
Palais Goerne/Lichtenau (ruins, 1946)

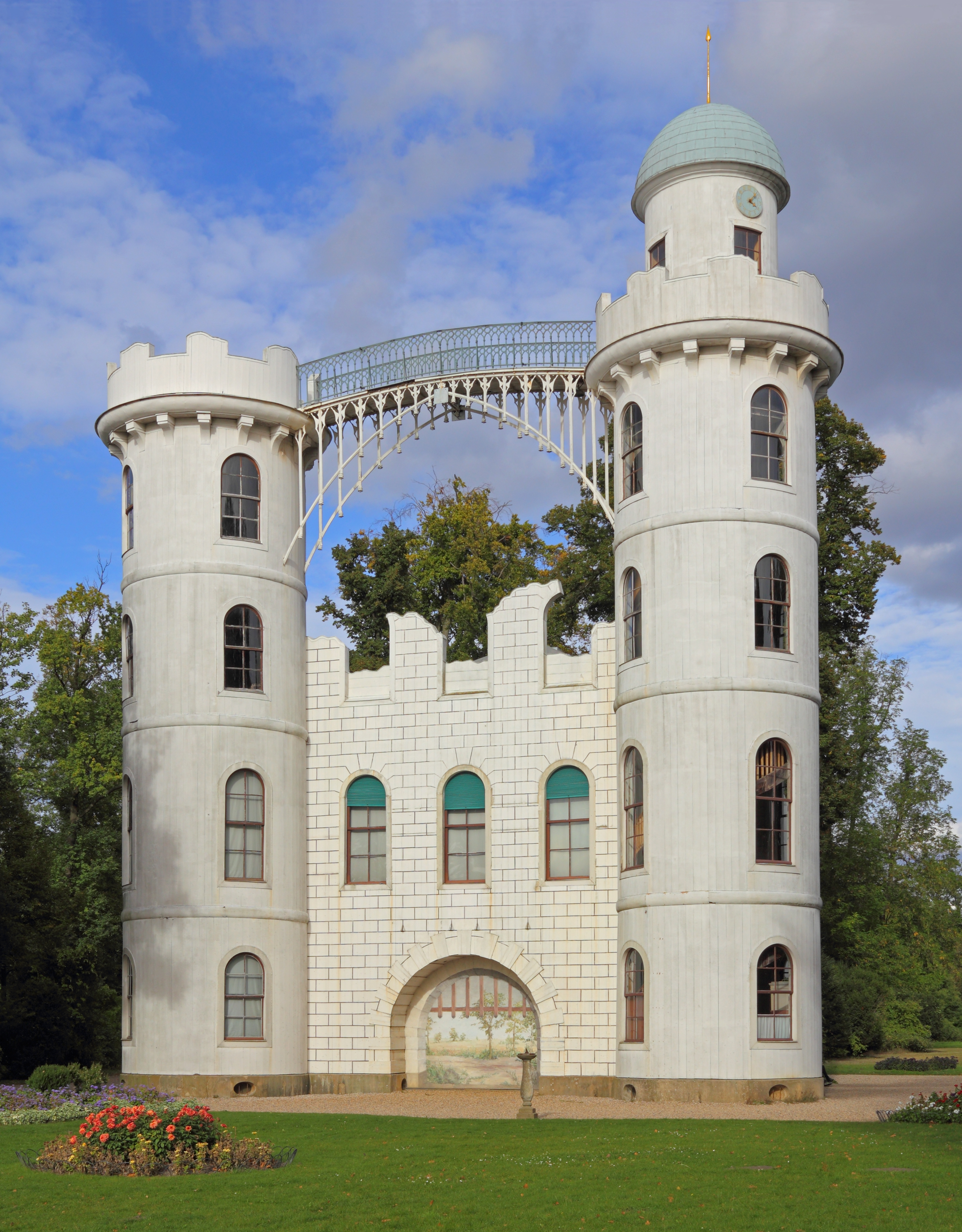
Schloss Pfaueninsel

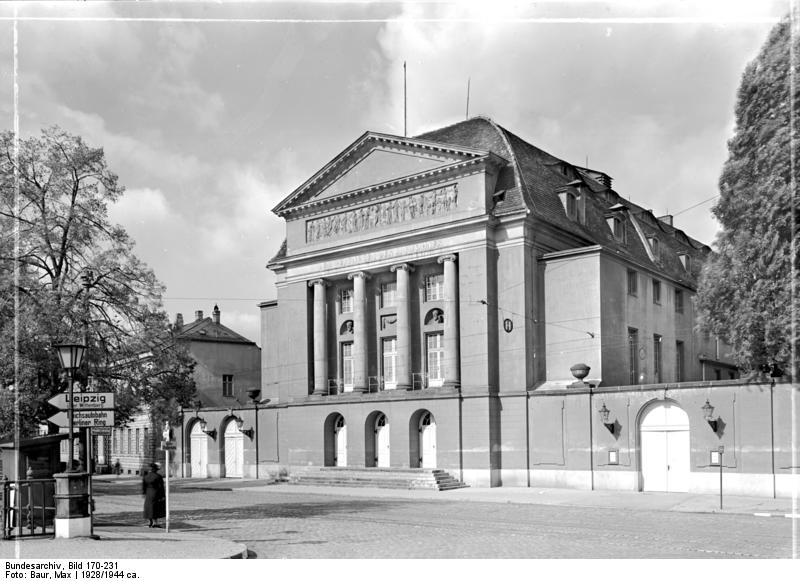
Schauspielhaus in Potsdam

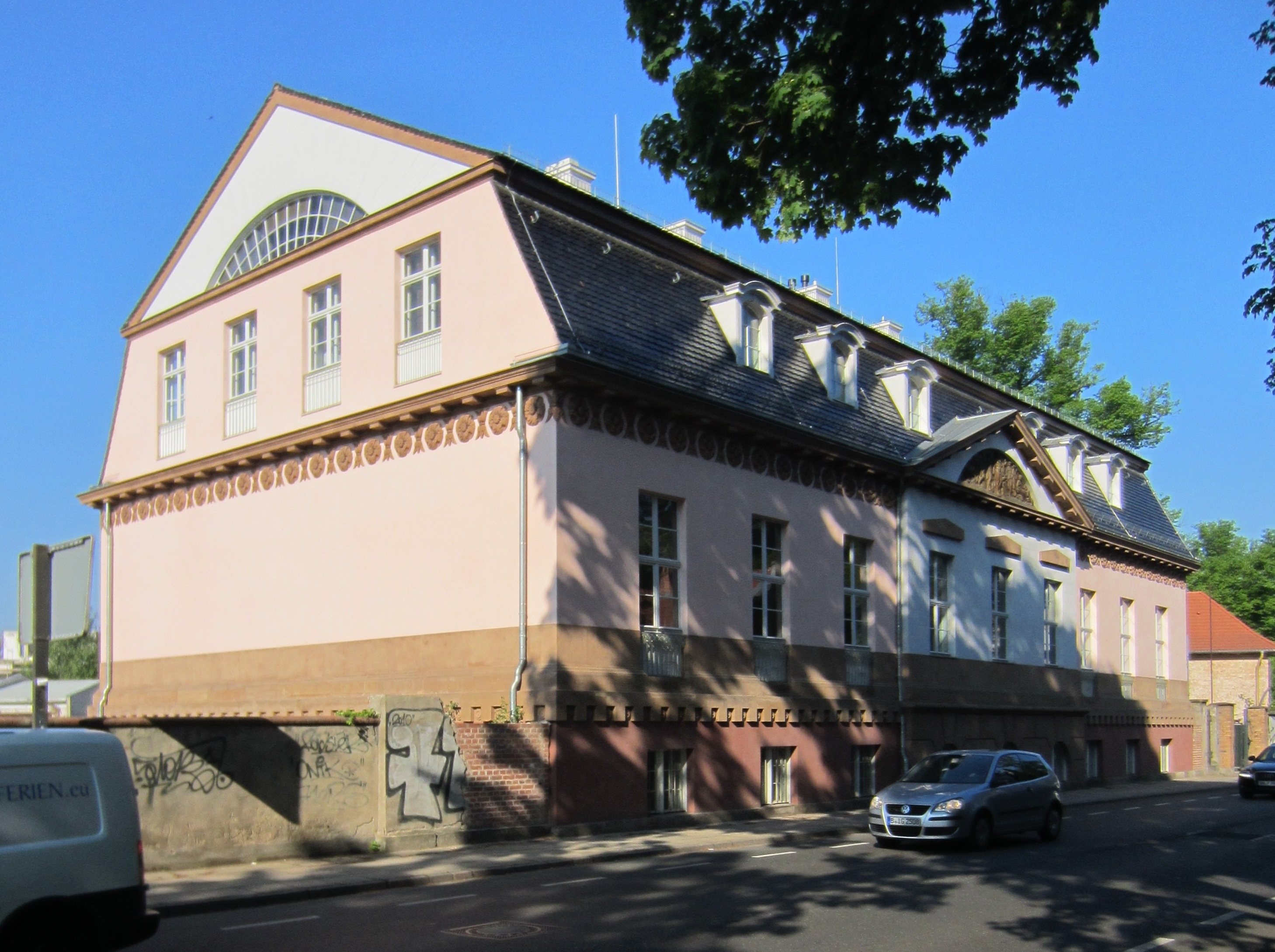
Palais Lichtenau, Potsdam

== Bibliography ==
- Irmgard Wirth (1955). "Boumann, Michael Philipp". Neue Deutsche Biographie (in German). Vol. 2. Berlin: Duncker & Humblot. p. 492. (full text online).
- Walther Killy, ed. (1999), Deutsche Biographische Enzyklopädie (DBE), Bd. 2, München: Saur, p. 49, ISBN 3-598-23186-5
- Geschichte der Grossen National-Mutterloge in den Preussischen Staaten genannt zu den drei Weltkugeln (6 ed.), Berlin, 1903, p. 408 (Digitalisat)
