= Cecilienhof =

Cecilienhof Palace
- Schloss Cecilienhof
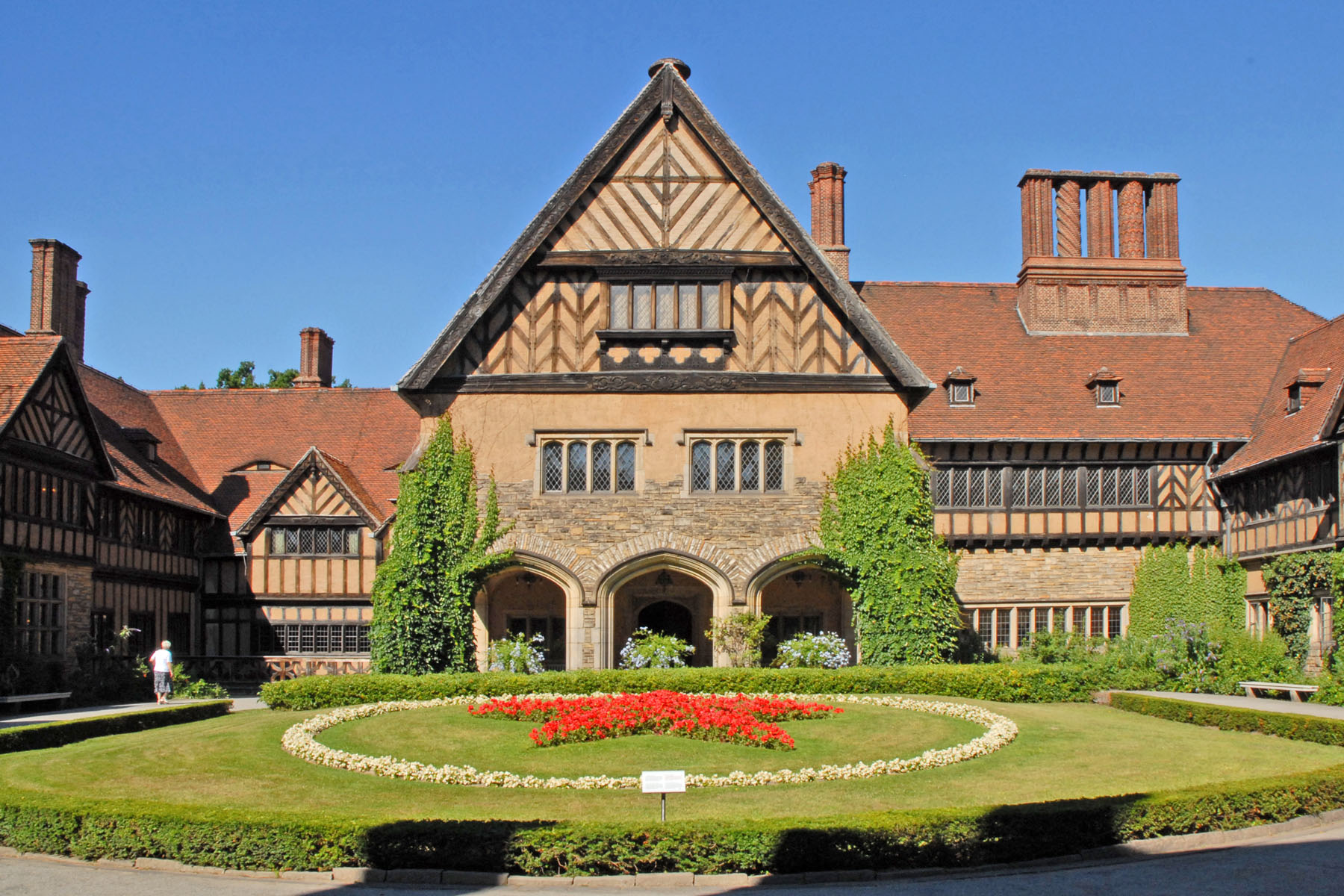
- Cecilienhof Palace seen from the commemorative courtyard, with the Soviet red star in the foreground

- Location within Brandenburg Location within Germany

General information
- Type: Palace
- Architectural style: Tudor Revival
- Location: Potsdam, Germany
- Coordinates: 52°25′09″N 13°04′15″E
- Construction started: April 1914
- Completed: August 1917
- Cost: 1,498,000 Reichsmark
- Client: Emperor Wilhelm II
- Landlord: Stiftung Preussische Schlösser und Gärten

Design and construction
- Architect: Paul Schultze-Naumburg
- Main contractor: Saalecker Werkstätten

Cecilienhof Palace (German: Schloss Cecilienhof) is a palace in Potsdam, Brandenburg, Germany, built from 1914 to 1917 in the look and layout of an English Tudor manor house. Cecilienhof was the last palace built by the House of Hohenzollern that ruled the Kingdom of Prussia and the German Empire, until the end of World War I. It is famous for having been the location of the Potsdam Conference in 1945, in which the leaders of the Soviet Union, the United Kingdom and the United States made important decisions affecting the shape of post-World War II Europe and Asia. Cecilienhof has been part of the Palaces and Parks of Potsdam and Berlin UNESCO World Heritage Site, since 1990. It closed to the public on 1 November 2024, for renovations.

== Location ==
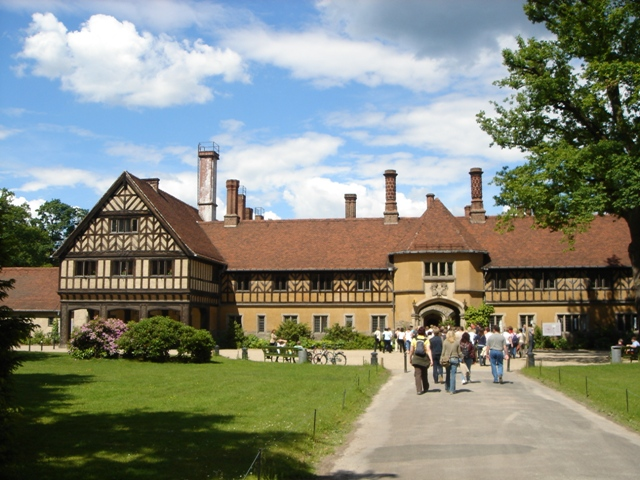
View from Neuer Garten

Cecilienhof is located in the northern part of the large Neuer Garten park, close to the shore of the Jungfernsee lake. The park was laid out from 1787 at the behest of King Frederick William II of Prussia, modelled on the Wörlitz Park in Anhalt-Dessau. Frederick William II also had the Marmorpalais (Marble Palace) built within the Neuer Garten, the first Brandenburg palace in the Neoclassical style erected, according to plans designed by Carl von Gontard and Carl Gotthard Langhans, which was finished in 1793. Other structures within the park close to Schloss Cecilienhof include an orangery, an artificial grotto (Muschelgrotte), the "Gothic Library", and the Dairy in the New Garden, also constructed for king Frederick William II.

The park was largely redesigned as an English landscape garden according to plans by Peter Joseph Lenné from 1816 onwards, with lines of sight to nearby Pfaueninsel, Glienicke Palace, Babelsberg Palace, and the Sacrow Church.

== Construction ==
Since the Marmorpalais, which had been the traditional Potsdam residence of the Hohenzollern crown prince, had become inadequate for current tastes, Emperor Wilhelm II ordered the establishment of a fund for constructing a new palace at Potsdam for his oldest son, Crown Prince Wilhelm (William) and his wife, Duchess Cecilie of Mecklenburg-Schwerin on 19 December 1912. After their marriage in 1905, Wilhelm and Cecilie had previously lived at the Marmorpalais for most of the year and at the Berlin Kronprinzenpalais in winter. In 1911, the Crown Prince had been appointed commander of the Prussian 1. Leibhusaren-Regiment and moved to Danzig-Langfuhr.

On 13 April 1914 the Imperial Ministry and the Saalecker Werkstätten signed a building contract that envisaged a completion date of 1 October 1915 and a construction cost of 1,498,000 Reichsmark for the new palace. The architect was Paul Schultze-Naumburg, who visited the couple in Danzig to work out the design for the palace. It was based on English Tudor style buildings, arranged around several courtyards featuring half-timbered walls, bricks and 55 different decorative chimney stacks. With the start of World War I in August 1914, construction stopped but was resumed in 1915.

== Architecture and interior design ==
Crown Prince Wilhelm was so impressed with cottage and Tudor style homes like Bidston Court in Birkenhead (England) that Cecilienhof was inspired by it. Also, due to Duchess Cecilie of Mecklenburg-Schwerin's family ties, German Tudor-styled Gelbensande Manor near Rostock in Mecklenburg-Schwerin was an inspiration. The palace was designed in such a way as to be inhabitable for most of the year. Its low structure and multiple courts conceal the fact that it boasts a total of 176 rooms. Besides the large Ehrenhof (three-sided courtyard) in the centre, which was used only for the arrival and departure of the Crown Prince and his wife, there is a smaller garden court, the Prinzengarten, and three other courts around which the various wings of the building are arranged.

The "public" rooms were located in the centre part on the ground floor, around a central great hall, while above on the first floor were the "private" bedroom, dressing rooms and bathrooms. The living area of the great hall also features a massive wooden stairway made of oak. This was a gift from the city of Danzig. The ground floor rooms included an area for the Crown Prince with smoking room, library and breakfast room as well as an area for his wife with music salon, writing room and a room designed like a cabin on an ocean liner. The latter was used by Cecilie as a breakfast room. Like some of the other rooms it was designed by Paul Ludwig Troost, who also designed actual interiors of ocean liners for the Norddeutscher Lloyd shipping line.

== History ==
=== History before 1945 ===
The palace was finished in August 1917. It was named Cecilienhof after the Duchess and the couple moved in immediately. Cecilie gave birth at Cecilienhof to her youngest child, Princess Cecilie, who was born on 5 September 1917. However, when the revolution erupted in November 1918, for security reasons Cecilie and her six children moved for a while to the Neues Palais, where the wife of Emperor Wilhelm II, Empress Augusta Victoria, was living. After the Empress followed her husband into exile in the Netherlands, Cecilie remained in Potsdam and returned to Cecilienhof where she lived until 1920. As the property of the Hohenzollern family had been confiscated after the revolution, Cecilie then had to move her residence to an estate at Oels in Silesia, which was a private property. Only her sons Wilhelm (William) and Louis Ferdinand remained at Cecilienhof while they attended a public Realgymnasium (school) in Potsdam. Crown Prince Wilhelm had gone into exile in the Netherlands on 13 November 1918 and was interned on the island of Wieringen. He was allowed to return to Germany—as a private citizen—on 9 November 1923. In June 1926, a referendum on expropriating the former ruling Princes of Germany without compensation failed and as a consequence, the financial situation of the Hohenzollern family improved considerably. A settlement between the state and the family made Cecilienhof property of the state but granted a right of residence to Wilhelm and Cecilie. This was limited in duration to three generations.

Wilhelm subsequently broke the promise he had made to Gustav Stresemann, who allowed him to return to Germany, to stay out of politics. He supported the rise to power of Adolf Hitler, who visited Cecilienhof three times, in 1926, in 1933 (on the "Day of Potsdam") and in 1935. However, when Wilhelm realized that Hitler had no intention of restoring the monarchy, their relationship cooled. After the assassination attempt on 20 July 1944, Hitler had Wilhelm placed under supervision by the Gestapo and had Cecilienhof watched.

In January 1945, Wilhelm left Potsdam for Oberstdorf for a treatment of his gall and liver problems. Cecilie fled in early February 1945 as the Red Army drew closer to Berlin, without being able to salvage much in terms of her possessions. At the end of the war, Cecilienhof was seized by the Soviets.

=== Potsdam Conference of 1945 ===
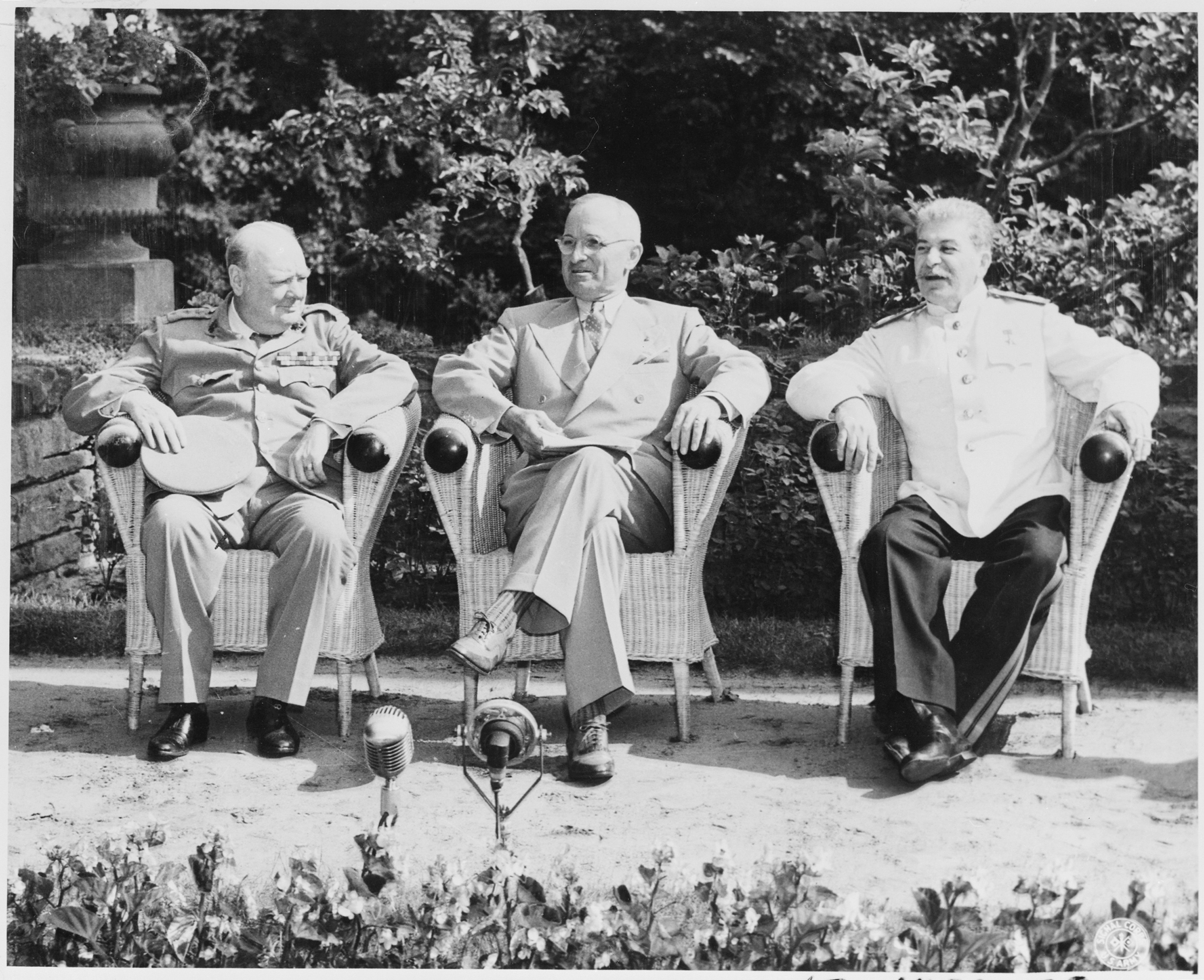
Potsdam Conference: Churchill, Truman and Stalin in the Cecilienhof garden, 25 July 1945

The Potsdam Conference (officially the "Berlin Conference") took place from 17 July to 2 August 1945. It was the third and longest summit between the heads of government of the Soviet Union, the United Kingdom and the United States, the major forces in the anti-Hitler-coalition that had just won the war after VE Day, 8 May 1945. The conference was mainly organized by the Soviets. Although the British prime minister Winston Churchill had refused to hold a summit "anywhere within the current Soviet military zone", US President Harry Truman and Soviet leader Josef Stalin had agreed in late May 1945 to meet "near Berlin". As Berlin itself had been too heavily damaged by Allied bombing and street-to-street fighting, Cecilienhof in Potsdam was selected as the location for the conference. The delegations were to be housed in the leafy suburb of Potsdam-Babelsberg, which had suffered only slight damage in the bombing raids and also offered the advantage that the streets to the conference venue were easy to guard.

Soviet soldiers repaired the streets connecting Babelsberg to Cecilienhof, built a pontoon bridge to replace the Glienicker Brücke, which had been destroyed during the last days of the war, planted trees, bushes and flower beds—including the Soviet red star in the Ehrenhof of the palace. At Cecilienhof, 36 rooms and the great hall were renovated and furnished with furniture from other Potsdam palaces. The furniture of Wilhelm and Cecilie had been removed by the Soviets and stored at the Dairy.

The main rooms used for the conference were as follows:

- Cecilie's music salon—White Salon, used by the Soviet delegation as a reception room (on the first day of the conference, this was also the site of a buffet Stalin provided to the other delegations),
- Cecilie's writing room—Red Salon, used by the Soviet delegation as a study,
- Great hall—this was the conference hall, fitted by the Soviets with a round table of 10 feet diameter (probably custom-made by a Moscow-based furniture company),
- Wilhelm's smoking room—study of the American delegation,
- Wilhelm's library—study of the British delegation,
- Wilhelm's breakfast room—possibly used as a secretary's office.

However, according to the official guide to the palace, evidence has recently emerged that indicates that the current designation of the British and American studies may have been switched by the Soviets after the conference.

=== Post World War II and today ===
Cecilienhof
UNESCO World Heritage Site
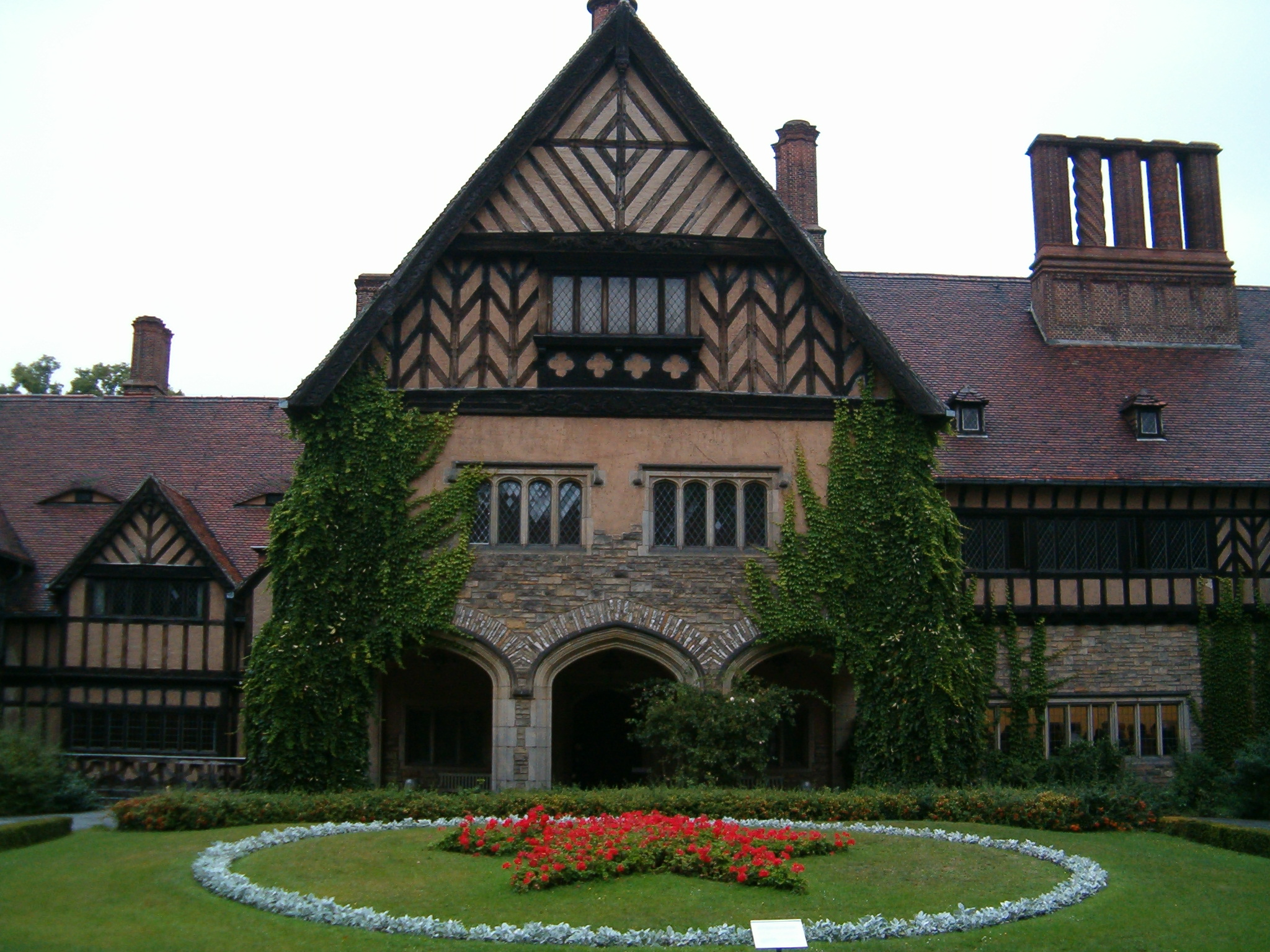

- Location within Germany
- Location: Potsdam, Germany
- Part of: Palaces and Parks of Potsdam and Berlin
- Criteria: Cultural: i, ii, iv
- Reference: 532
- Inscription: 1990 (14th Session)
- Coordinates: 52°25′9″N 13°4′14″E

After the conference ended, Soviet troops used the palace as a clubhouse. It was handed over to the state of Brandenburg and in 1952 a memorial for the Conference was set up in the former private chambers of Wilhelm and Cecilie. The government of Eastern Germany also used the palace as a reception venue for state visits. The rest of the complex became a hotel in 1960. Some of the rooms were used by the ruling party (SED) for meetings.

However, after 1961, a part of the Neuer Garten was destroyed to build the southwest section of the Berlin Wall (as part of the Grenzsicherungsanlagen), which ran along the shore of Jungfernsee. Beginning in 1985, the VEB Reisebüro (state-owned travel agency) modernised the hotel.

Today, parts of Cecilienhof are still used as a museum and as a hotel. In 1990, it became part of the UNESCO World Heritage Site called Palaces and Parks of Potsdam and Berlin. The private rooms were opened to the public in 1995, after comprehensive restoration work. Queen Elizabeth II visited Cecilienhof on 3 November 2004. On 30 May 2007, the palace was used for a summit by the G8 foreign ministers. In 2011, Schloss Cecilienhof was awarded the European Heritage Label. The redesigned permanent exhibition on the Potsdam Conference was reopened in April 2012.
