= Johannes Rudolphi =

German painter

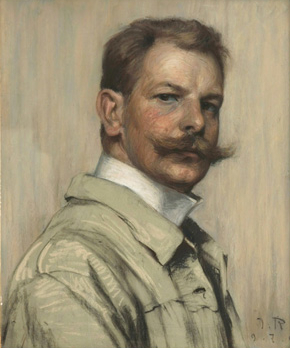
Self-portrait (1908)

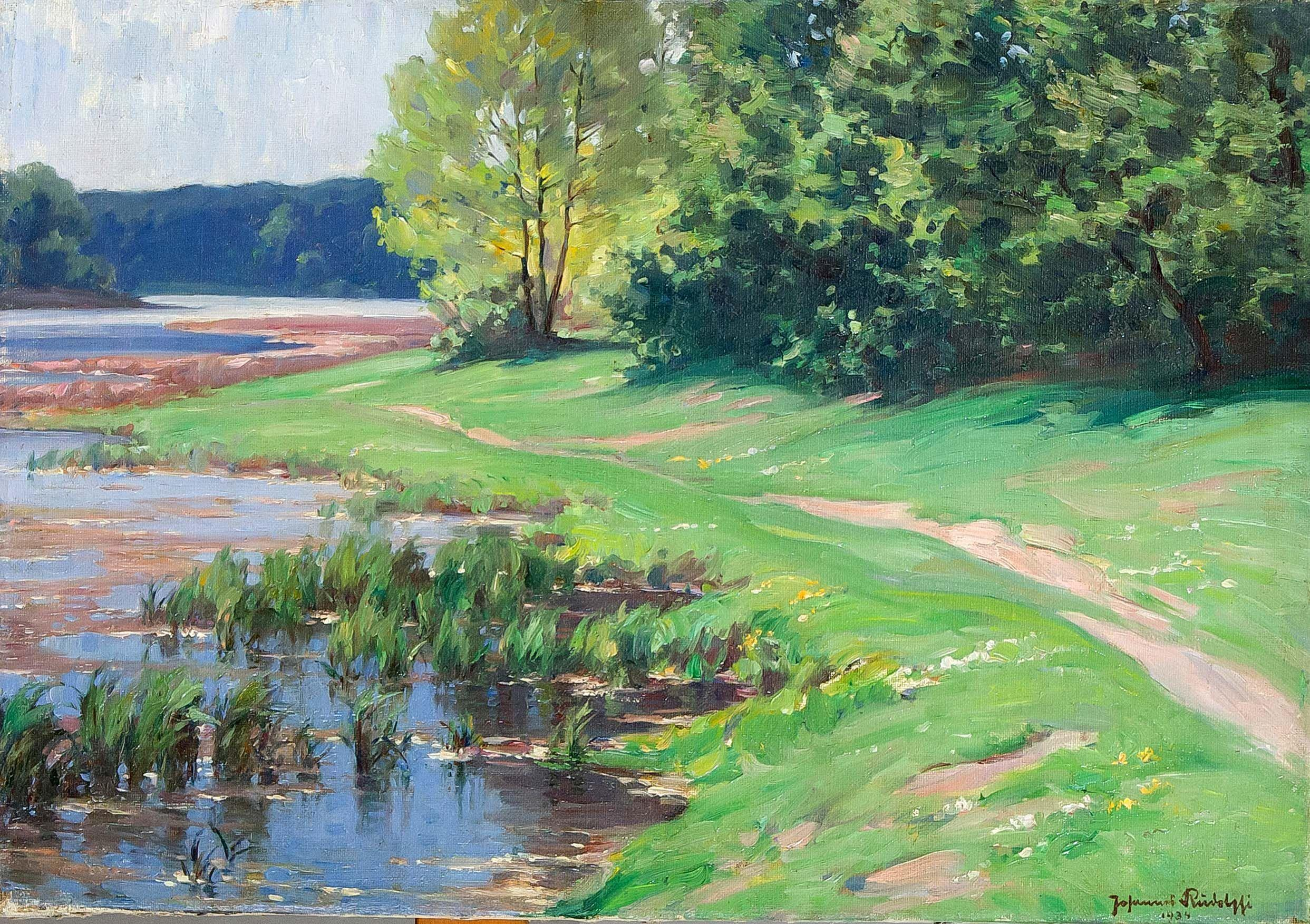
The Upper Path

Johannes Rudolphi (5 October 1877, Potsdam - 21 January 1950, Potsdam) was a German landscape painter in the Post-Impressionist style.

== Life and work ==
His father, Wilhelm Rudolphi, was a doctor, and a descendant of the Westphalian painter, Johann Georg Rudolphi. In 1899, he enrolled at the Academy of Fine Arts, Munich, where he studied "painting from nature" with Gabriel von Hackl. After returning home, he attended the Prussian Academy of Arts. It was then that he decided to focus on landscapes. In 1901 he married the painter, Margarete Haeberlin, daughter of the architect, Franz Haeberlin. One of their sons, Wolfram, would also become a painter.

He completed his studies in 1902 and settled in Berlin. His summers were often spent in a small house near the Neuen Garten, from which he would go on painting excursions. He also made extended trips to the Uckermark, Küstrin and the Neumark. His first major showing was at the Große Berliner Kunstausstellung of 1905. He exhibited there until 1909, when he joined the Berlin Secession. The following year, he moved into a house with a studio near the Schlachtensee, where he lived and worked for the rest of his life. Most of his landscapes depict areas in Brandenburg. He was especially fond of the lowlands in Golm.

During World War I, he ventured out little and limited himself to pencil sketches. After the war, he went through what may have been his most significant creative phase, and his works were very popular; throughout the Weimar period and the Nazi regime. In the 1940s, his eyesight began to weaken, due to an unspecified eye disease, and his painting became sporadic. He died at the age of seventy-two, at the Oberlinhaus (an elderly care facility) and was interred in the Haeberlin family plot at the Bornstedter Friedhof.
