= Pfaueninsel Palace =

- Schloss Pfaueninsel
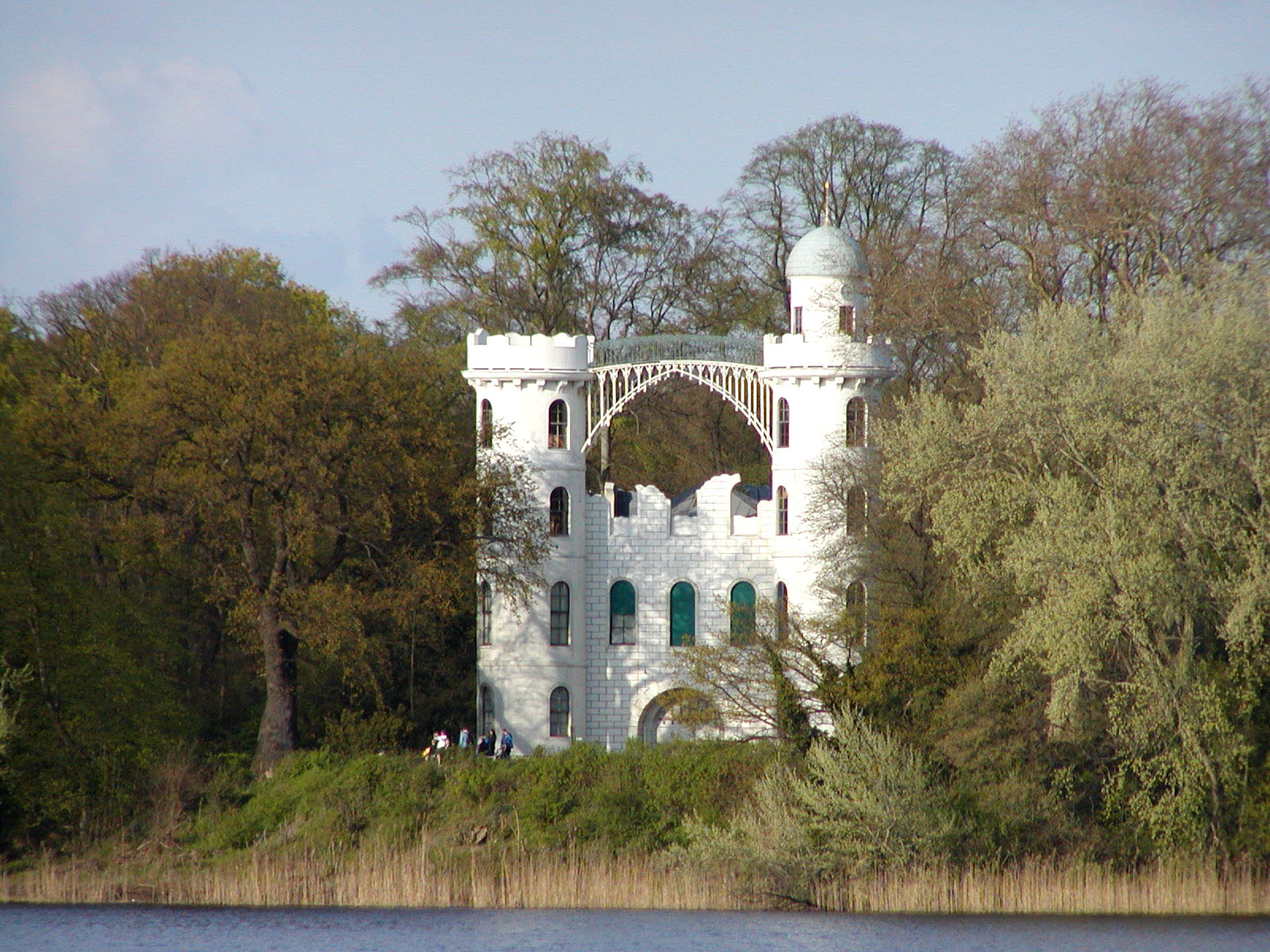
- Pfaueninsel Palace, 2008
- Interactive map of the Pfaueninsel Palace area

General information
- Type: Palace
- Architectural style: Neoclassical
- Location: Berlin, Germany
- Coordinates: 52°25′51″N 13°07′12″E
- Construction started: 1794
- Completed: 1797

Design and construction
- Architect: Johann Gottlieb Brendel

The Pfaueninsel Palace (German: Schloss Pfaueninsel) is a Romantic-style building on the shore of the Havel in Berlin. Constructed on behalf of Frederick William II, the Lustschloss was completed in 1797. Today, the palace is a museum of the Prussian Palaces and Gardens Foundation Berlin-Brandenburg.

== Planning ==
Between 1787 and 1792, Friedrich Wilhelm II had a summer palace built for himself in the form of the Marmorpalais on the Heiliger See in Potsdam, and in the following years he included the more distant surroundings in the park landscape. From the Marble Palace, a line of sight was created to the neighboring Pfaueninsel – which was then still called Kaninchenwerder – which was to be crowned with an eye-catcher at the end. Since Pfaueninsel was within easy reach of a rowing boat from the Marmorpalais and one could also take a boat from the more distant Schloss Charlottenburg, a small castle was to be built here, where one could rest after a boat trip and also spend the night. Friedrich Wilhelm, who maintained a life-long relationship with Wilhelmine von Lichtenau, certainly also had in mind being able to spend time here undisturbed with his confidante and beloved. The affection went so far that in 1796 he ennobled Wilhelmine to Countess Lichtenau. Occasionally referred to as the "Prussian pompadour", Wilhelmine was involved in the planning of the castle and she was largely allowed to determine the interior design, furniture and decorations herself. However, the Countess could not really enjoy the work, as in the year the small castle was completed her patron Friedrich Wilhelm II died and she was sent into exile. The castle was then used by Friedrich Wilhelm's successor.

== See also ==
- Pfaueninsel, about the island

== Bibliography ==
- "Die Pfaueninsel – Amtlicher Führer". Stiftung Preußischer Schlösser und Gärten. Potsdam, 2000.
