= Dairy in the New Garden =

Building in Potsdam, Germany

Coordinates: 52°25′19″N 13°4′11″E

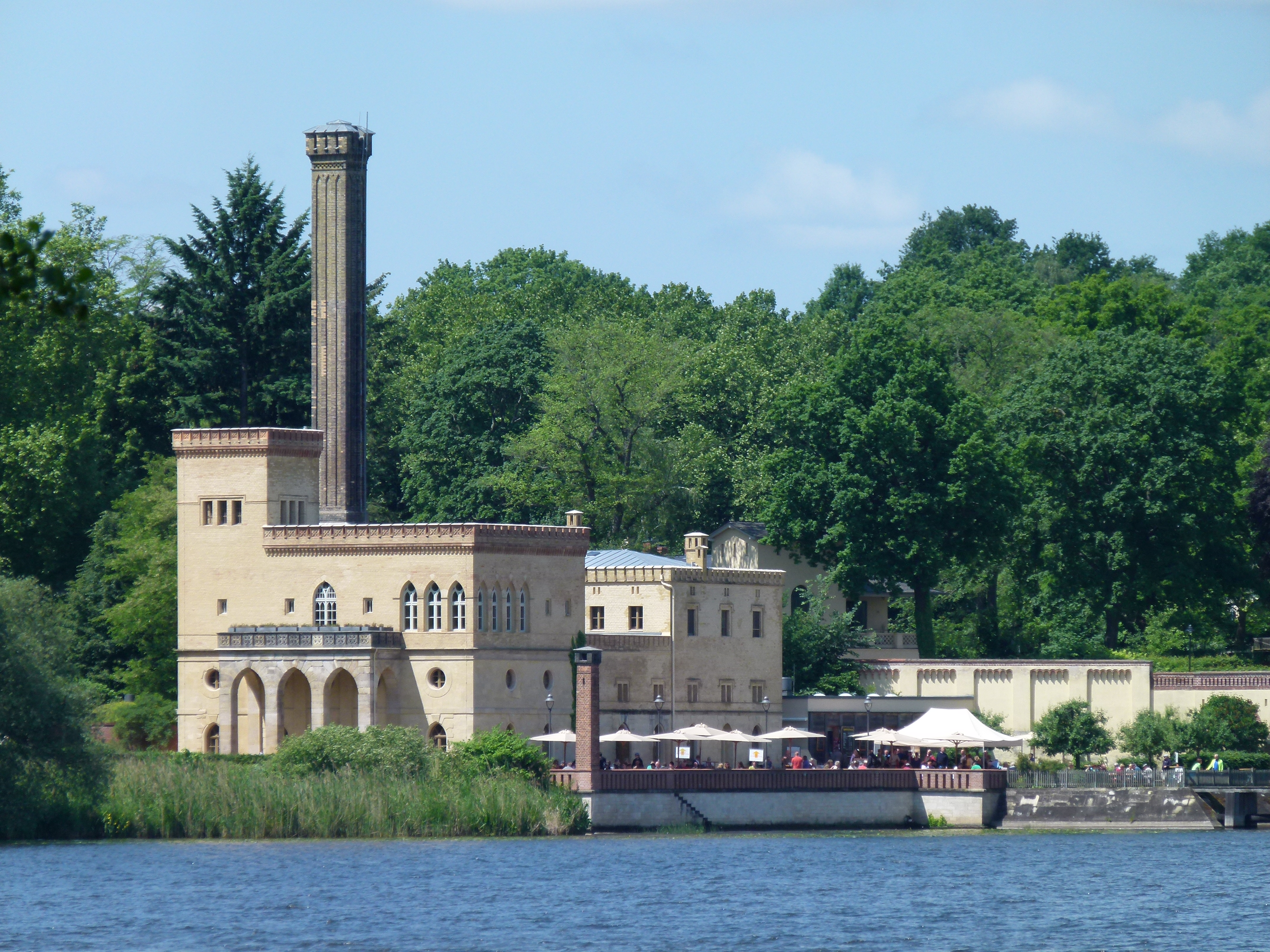
The dairy in the New Garden

The Dairy in the New Garden (Alte Meierei) is a historic building located in Potsdam, Germany. It is situated on the shore of the Jungfernsee lake, at the northernmost tip of the New Garden. The Dairy was constructed between 1790 and 1792 under the supervision of master builder Carl Gotthard Langhans, with Andreas Ludwig Krüger carrying out the construction.

== History ==
In the course of laying out the landscape garden and building the Marble Palace under Frederick William II of Prussia, a dairy was built to supply the royal court. Cows grazing on the surrounding land produced milk for the manufacture of butter and cheese.

In 1843/1844 Frederick William IV. had the building extended. To a design by the architect Ludwig Persius a second storey was added under the direction of Ludwig Ferdinand Hesse and the southwest corner was enhanced with a tower. Battlements run along the edges of the roof and gave the building a Norman character.

A second expansion was carried out in 1857 with the engine or pump house, which was built to water the New Garden. The high, slender chimney is part of that technical modification. The upper basin for the supply of water is nowadays located within the Belvedere on the Pfingstberg.

In 1928 a restaurant was established in the building that became one of the most popular destinations for day trippers in Potsdam until the Second World War.

Its occupation by the Red Army at the end of 1945 and the destruction by fire of part of the building ended its gastronomic function. The dairy was still in this ruined condition when the Berlin Wall was built in 1961.

In 1991, after the Wende, renovation and restoration measures were carried out on the old building and, in 2003, it was able to re-open as a brewery and restaurant (Gasthausbrauerei).
