= New Garden, Potsdam =

UNESCO World Heritage Site
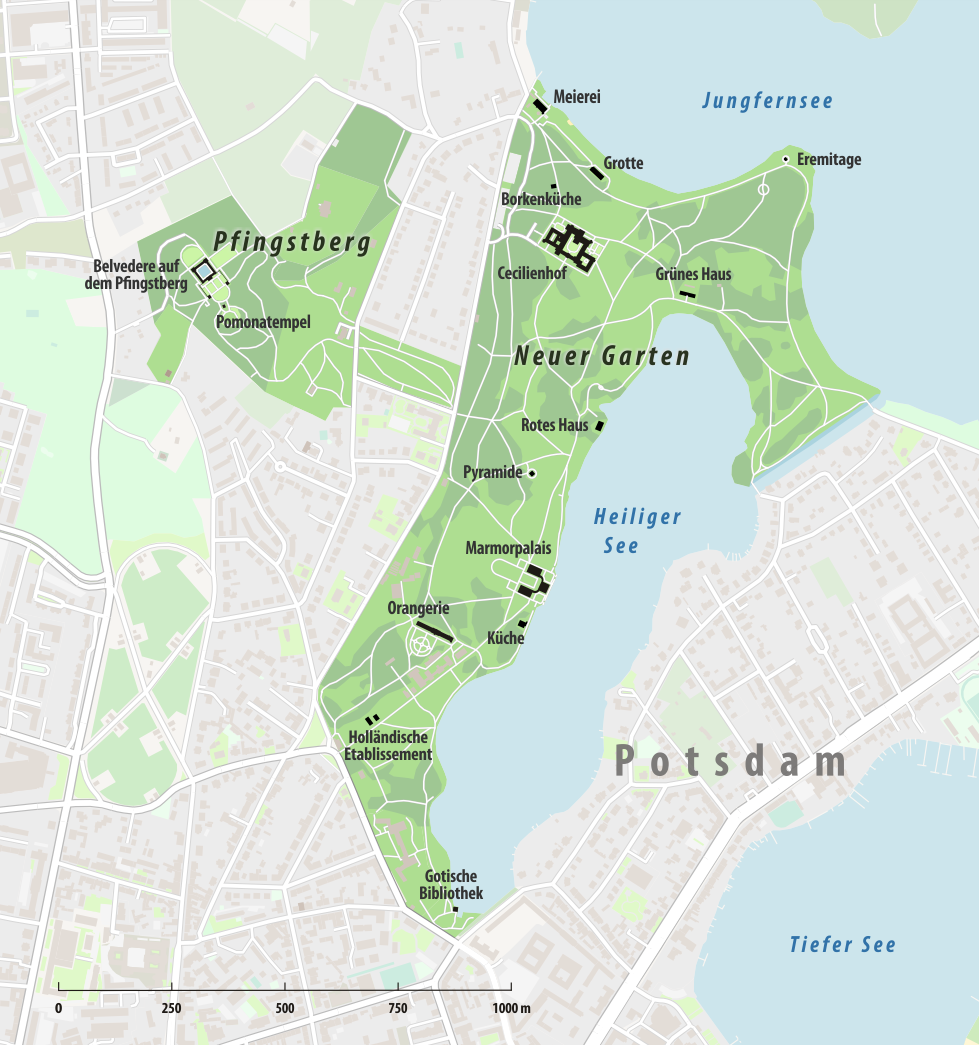
- New Garden

- Location within Germany Location within Brandenburg
- Location: Potsdam, Brandenburg, Germany
- Part of: Palaces and Parks of Potsdam and Berlin
- Criteria: Cultural: (i)(ii)(iv)
- Reference: 532ter
- Inscription: 1990 (14th Session)
- Extensions: 1992, 1999
- Coordinates: 52°24′56″N 13°04′10″E

The New Garden (German: Neuer Garten) in Potsdam is a park of 102.5 hectares located southwest of Berlin, Germany, in northern Potsdam and bordering on the lakes Heiliger See and Jungfernsee. Starting in 1787, Frederick William II of Prussia (1744–1797) arranged to have a new garden laid out on this site, and the design and landscaping was carried out by landscape architect Johann August Eyserbeck, who had previously worked on the Dessau-Wörlitz Garden Realm.

The New Garden, along with the Marmorpalais palace on its grounds and other palaces and parks in Potsdam and Berlin was inscribed on the UNESCO World Heritage List in 1990 because of its unique unity of architecture and landscaping and its testimony to the power of Prussia in the 17th and 18th centuries.

== History ==
When he was still crown prince, Frederick William II of Prussia procured property situated on lake Heiliger See, supplementing it later by the purchase of adjoining fruit gardens and vineyards. One year after his accession to the throne work began on creating a park which in the spirit of the times was supposed to reflect contemporary garden architecture, setting it apart from the then out of fashion baroque ornamental and kitchen grounds of Frederick the Great's nearby Sanssouci. On visits to the small principality of Anhalt-Dessau the king had become acquainted with the Dessau-Wörlitz Garden Realm (now a UNESCO World Heritage Site). This park was the earliest and largest English landscape park on the continent and corresponded to the king's ideal of a garden. The architect of Wörlitz Gardens, Johann August Eyserbeck, was engaged to bring this concept to Potsdam.

At the same time a new garden was being laid out in Potsdam, Frederick William II had a new palace erected between 1787 and 1792. The Marmorpalais ("Marble Palace") was a work of early Classicism following plans by Carl von Gontard and Carl Gotthard Langhans, the latter primarily responsible for the interior work. This building brought to Berlin-Brandenburg a style already long common in the rest of Europe and initiated a transition to a new artistic epoch.

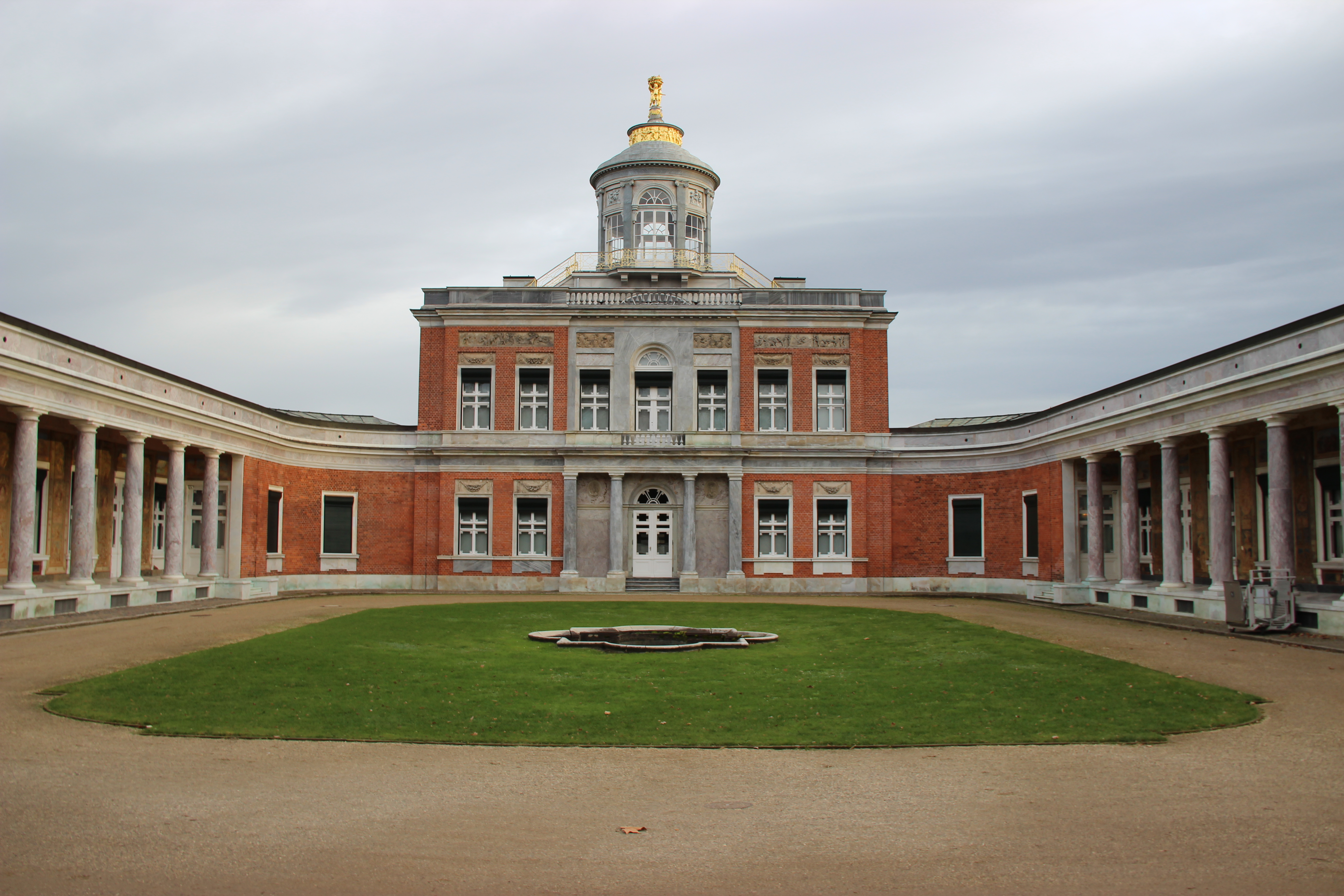
The Marble Palace

In 1816, during the reign of Frederick William III, Peter Joseph Lenné, at the time still a journeyman gardener apprentice, arrived in Potsdam and was given the task of redesigning the neglected and overgrown garden. While retaining some of the existing garden units he created an English landscape garden with extensive open spaces, lawns and wide pathways, and especially lines of sight to the Pfaueninsel, Glienicke, Babelsberg and Sacrow.

Near the end of the reign of Kaiser Wilhelm II in 1913, the last palace of the Hohenzollern dynasty was erected in the northern part of the New Garden, Cecilienhof Palace. His eldest son, Crown Prince Wilhelm, and his wife Cecilie lived there until early in 1945, and the site was selected for the signed of the Potsdam Agreement.

== Description ==
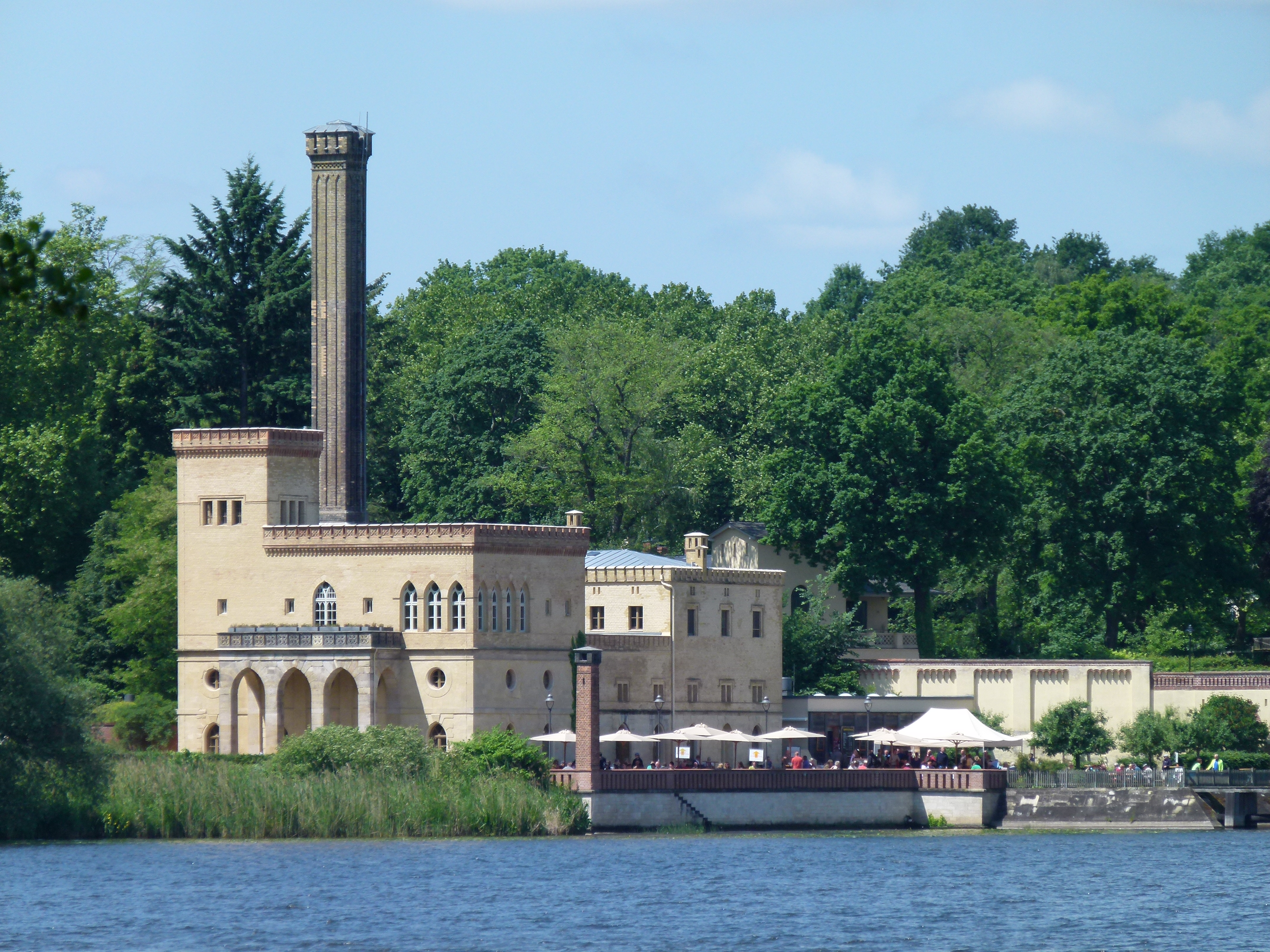
The dairy, now a restaurant

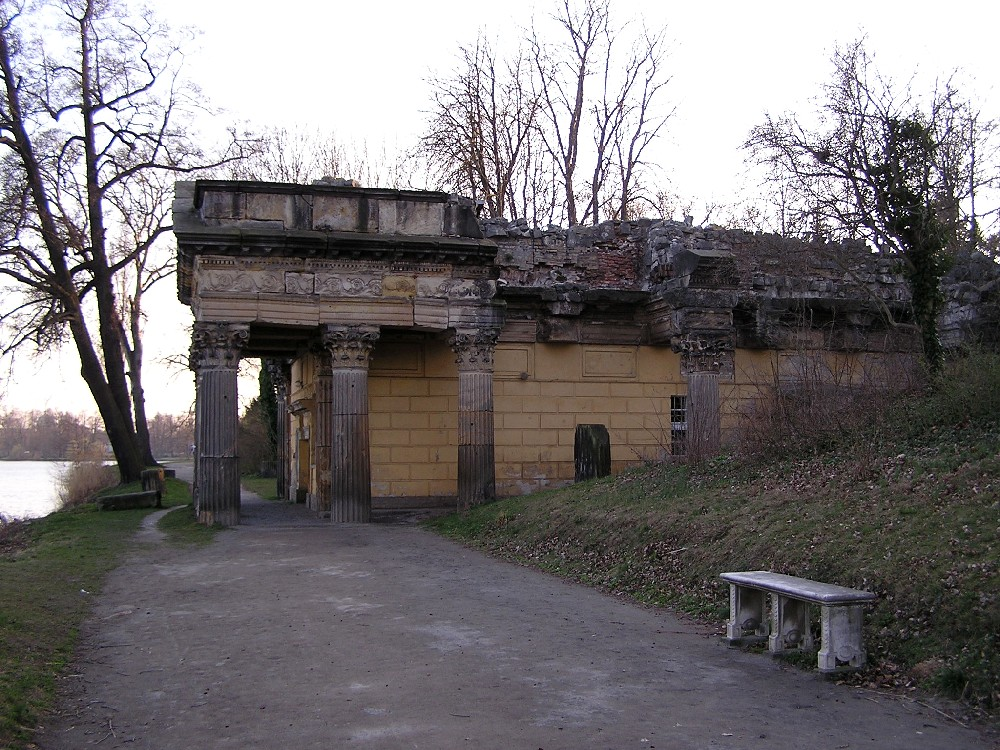
Palace kitchen as a temple ruin

In contrast to the extensive English landscape gardens of the 19th century, whose primary elements were trees, meadows and water, the English garden of the 18th century was characterized by relatively discrete regions decorated with small architectural elements. The landscape character was emphasized in a design intended to reproduce nature. The trees and plants were not to be shaped and trimmed, but left to grow naturally. Rural life was also "rediscovered" in the process. Browsing cows were part of the scene in the New Garden, with their milk being processed to butter and cheese in a dairy at the northwest corner of the park (now a lakeshore restaurant). Summer houses which existed on the property were incorporated in the planning and have survived to the present. They are designated by their color: the Brown, Red or Green House.

Frederick William II belonged to a lodge of Freemasons and to the more mystically oriented secret society of the Rosicrucians. Several buildings in the New Garden reflect Freemason traditions. For example, the palace kitchen was built in the form of a partially buried temple, the cold storage room in the form of a pyramid, and the library in Gothic style. This architecture bears no relationship to the purpose of the buildings. Carl Gotthard Langhans and Andreas Ludwig Krüger were acknowledging bygone styles when designing these utilitarian structures.

The cold-storage ice house, erected in 1791–1792 as a pyramid in the northern line-of-sight of the Marble Palace, was used to keep perishable food fresh. In the winter ice was cut from the nearby Heiliger See lake and stored in the lowest level of the cellar, which was about 5 meters below ground. The Gothic Library is at the southern border of the New Garden. This little two-level pavilion contained the library of Frederick William II, with works in French being located on the ground floor and those in German on the upper level. In contrast to his predecessor Frederick the Great, who favored everything French, Frederich William II encouraged German arts and letters. Only works by Friedrich Schiller and Gotthold Ephraim Lessing could be performed in Prussian theaters. The Egyptian entrance to the orangery (built from 1791 to 1793) is topped by a sphinx sculpture. Two black statues of Egyptian gods from the atelier of the sculptor Johann Gottfried Schadow adorn wall recesses in the semicircular entrance area. A wood-paneled room with a decor of palm trees was located in the middle of this long narrow building. It was used for public concerts in which the musical king himself played the cello. To the east and west are halls for plants.

Frederick William II surrounded his place of retreat and refuge with a high wall along the west side of the park. The main entrance in the southwest is flanked by two Dutch-style gatehouses containing stables, carriage houses and the like. On the boulevard which led directly to the Marble Palace there are a number of red brick buildings also in a Dutch architectural style; these provided housing for servants as well as a charming scene when viewed from lake Heiliger See. It concluded with the House of the Cavaliers and Ladies for the noble entourage or high-ranking guests. The most illustrious occupant of the establishment was Wilhelmine Countess of Lichtenau, who had earlier on been the mistress of Frederick William II. As a close confidante of the king, she spent the summer months here from 1791 to 1797 at the House of Cavaliers and Ladies with her children in the vicinity of the king.

An artificial grotto decorated with minerals and shells on the northern end of the New Garden was constructed 1791/1792 according to plans by Andreas Ludwig Krüger. This area for relaxation on warm summer days was supposed to look like a natural structure when viewed from the outside. Three rooms were decorated on the inside with mirrors, colored glass and shells. Only the foundation is left of a small kitchen built nearby. A little round forest house nearby, the Hermitage, had a reed roof and was covered with oak bark on the outside.

The palace kitchen, built between 1788 and 1790, an artificial ruin facing lake Heiliger See, was designed to look like a half-buried temple near the foot of a flight of stairs leading down from a terrace of the Marble Palace, to which it was connected by an underground corridor.

An obelisk in the park was constructed from 1793 to 1794 of bluish-grey marble following a design by Carl Gotthard Langhans. Its four low relief medallions were created by the Wohler brothers and Johann Gottfried Schadow and represent the four seasons, symbolized by four male heads at different stages of life. There is also a white marble herme (1798) depicting the Greek military leader Themistocles, a copy of an antique original.

== List of historic buildings in the New Gardens ==
Constructed between 1787 and 1793 in the new Garden during the reign of Frederick William II:

- Marble Palace
- Palace kitchen, in the form of a temple ruin
- Orangery
- So-called "Gothic Library"
- Ice house in the form of a pyramid
- Dairy
- Grotto
- So-called "Dutch houses"
- Hermitage pavilion

Constructed between 1913 and 1916 under Kaiser Wilhelm II for Crown Prince Wilhelm:

- Cecilienhof Palace
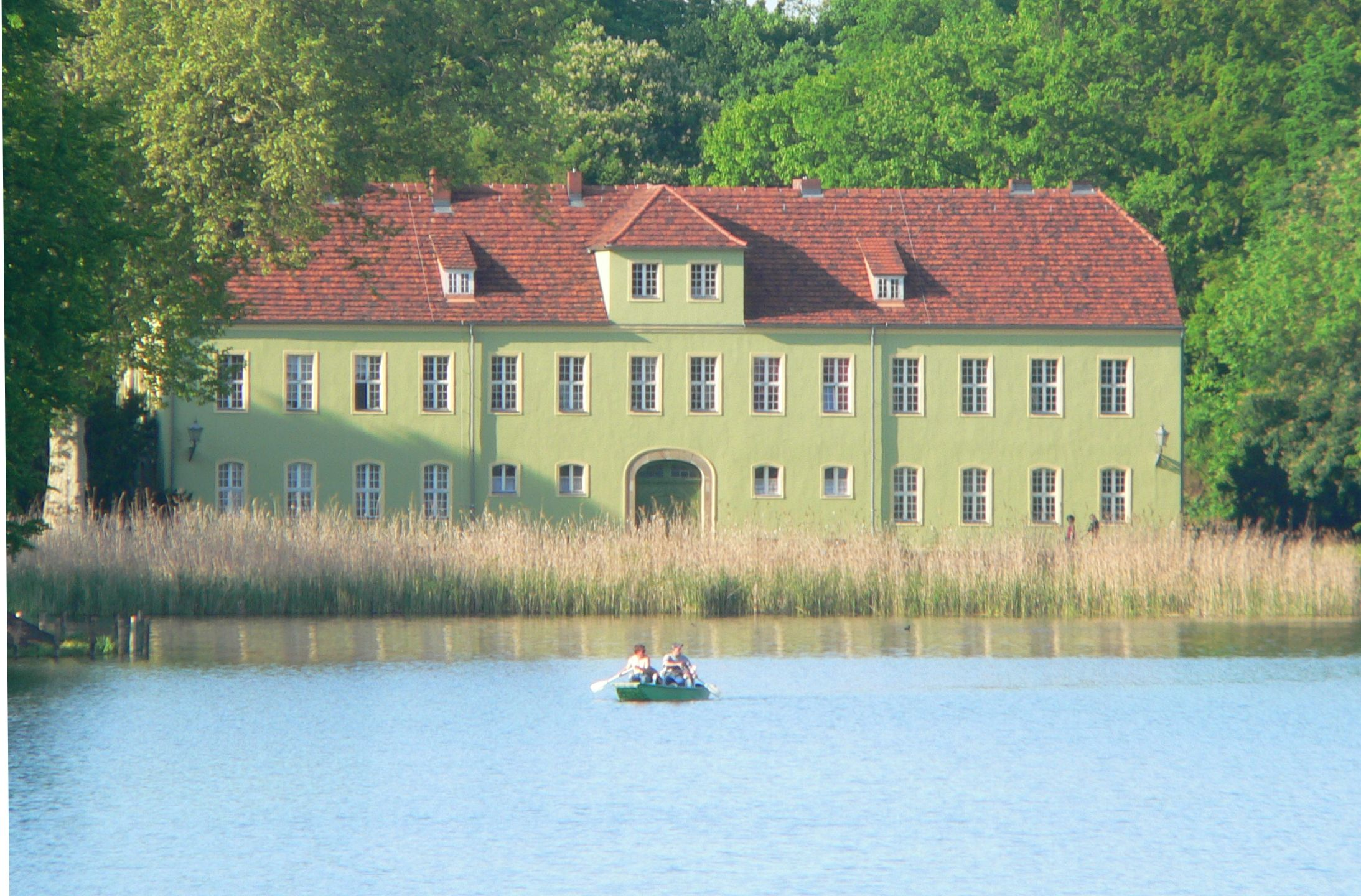
The Green House

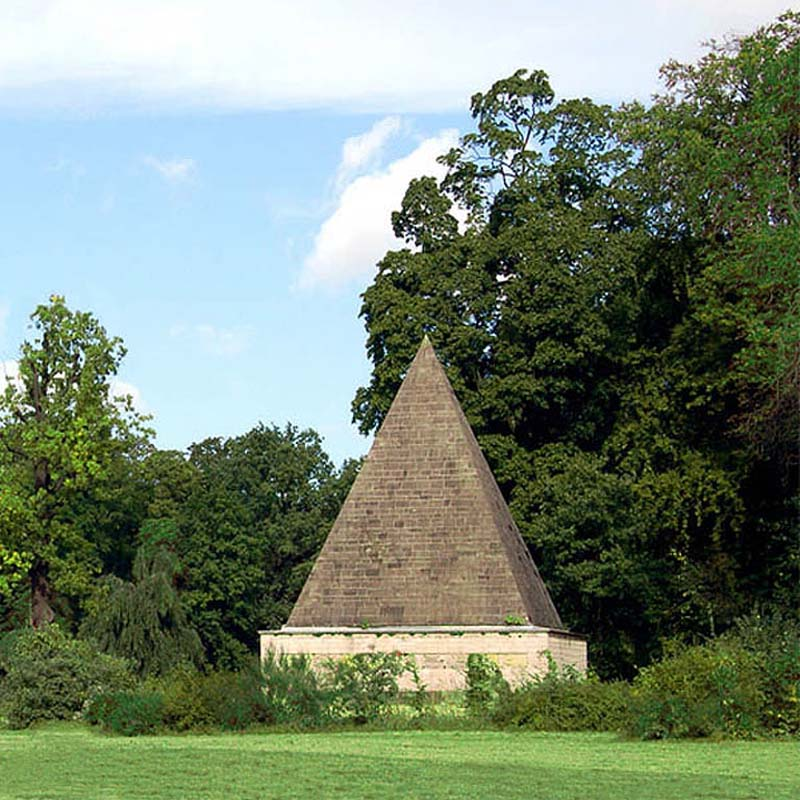
Ice house shaped as a pyramid

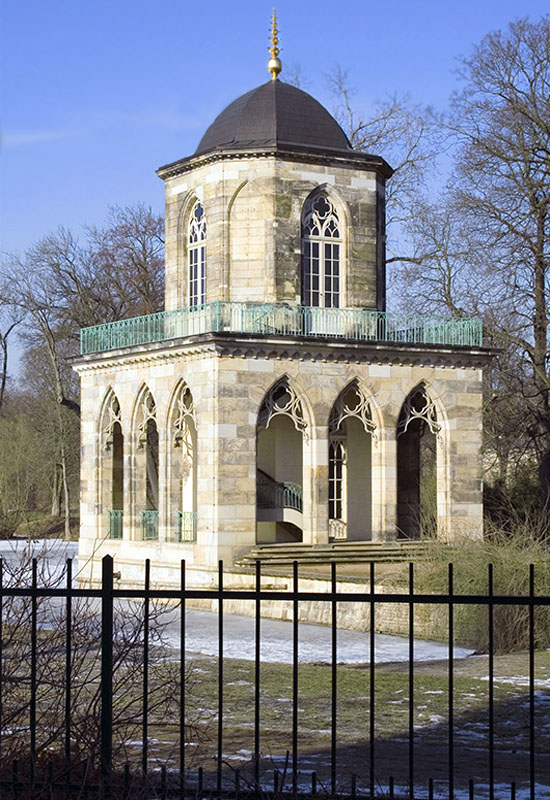
The so-called Gothic Library

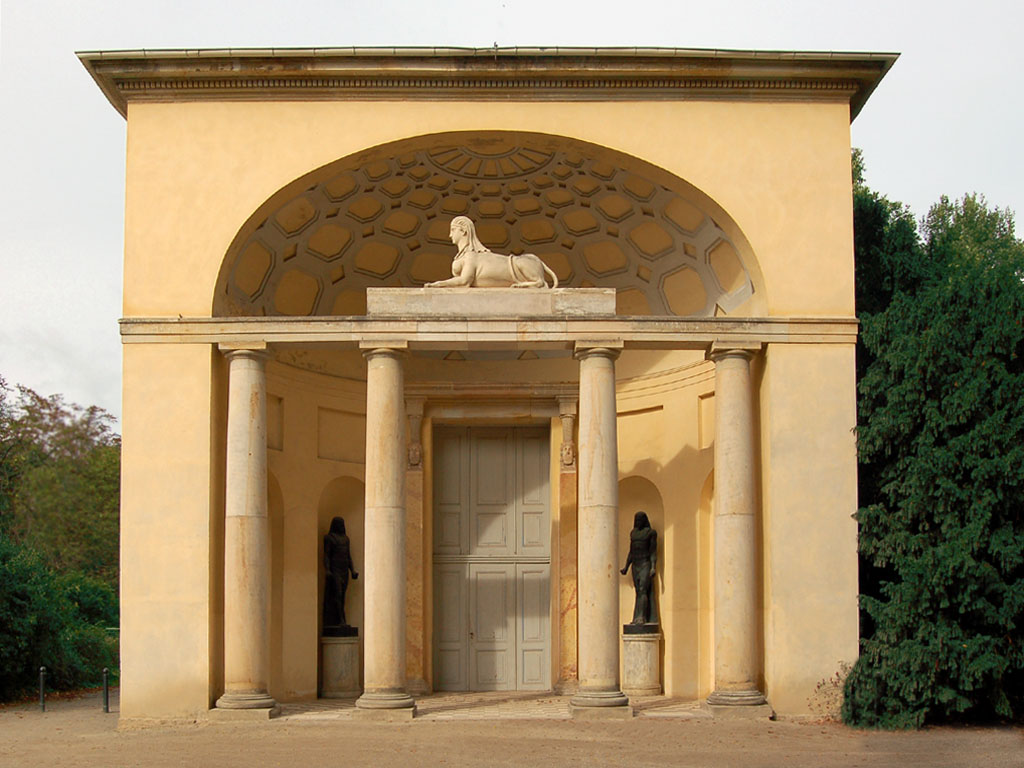
Egyptian entrance to the orangery

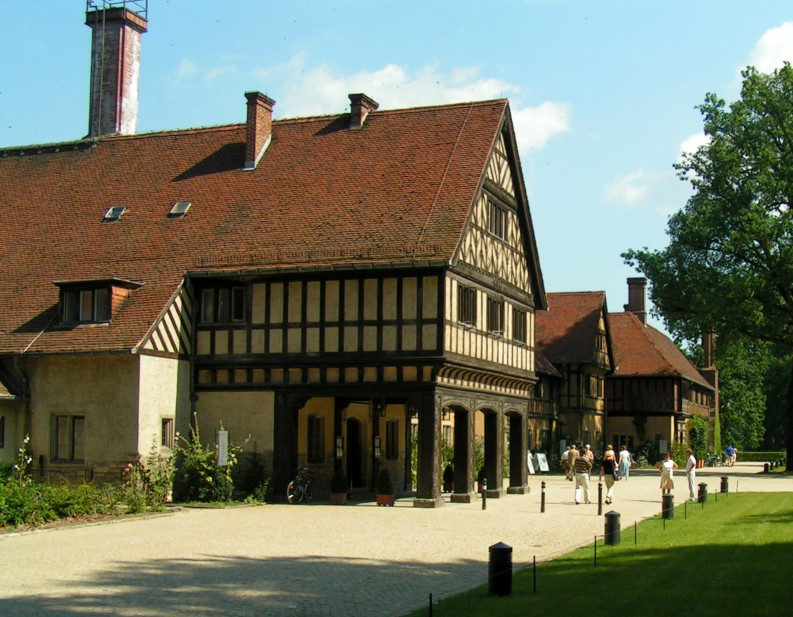
Cecilienhof Palace

== Sources and further information ==
This article is based on a translation of the equivalent article "Neuer Garten Potsdam" in the German Wikipedia.

Gert Streidt, Klaus Frahm: Potsdam. Die Schlösser und Gärten der Hohenzollern. Könemann Verlagsgesellschaft mbH. Köln 1996, ISBN 3-89508-238-4
