= Marmorpalais =

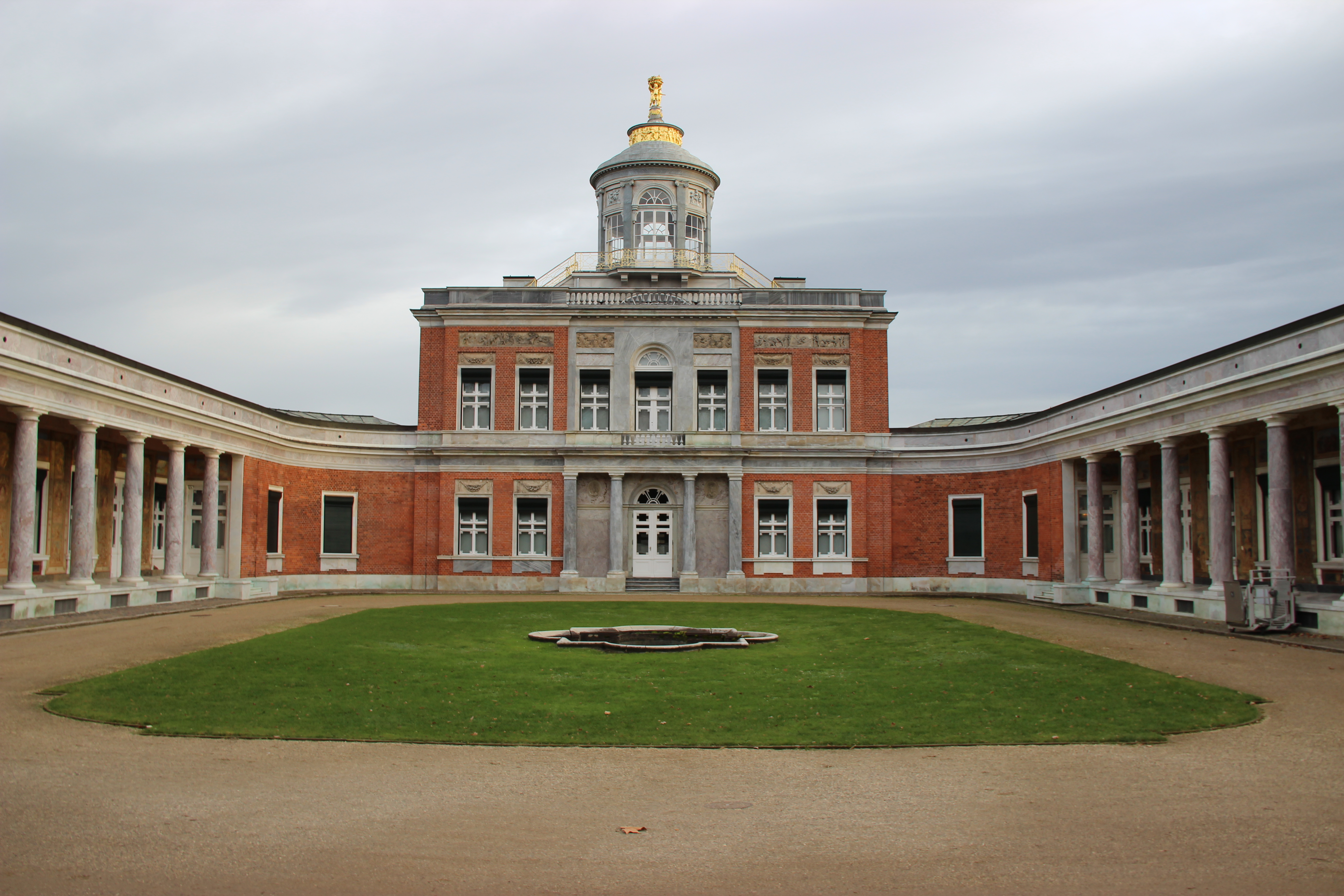
- Marmorpalais

- Location within Germany Location within Brandenburg
- Alternative names: Marble Palace

General information
- Type: Palace
- Architectural style: Neoclassical
- Location: Potsdam, Germany
- Coordinates: 52.412°N 13.069°E
- Construction started: 1787
- Completed: 1791
- Client: Frederick William II of Prussia
- Owner: Stiftung Preußische Schlösser und Gärten Berlin-Brandenburg

Design and construction
- Architects: Carl von Gontard; Carl Gotthard Langhans

Website
- Stiftung Preußische Schlösser und Gärten

UNESCO World Heritage Site
- Part of: Palaces and Parks of Potsdam and Berlin
- Criteria: Cultural: (i)(ii)(iv)
- Reference: 532ter
- Inscription: 1990 (14th Session)
- Extensions: 1992, 1999

The Marmorpalais (or Marble Palace) is a former royal residence in Potsdam, near Berlin in Germany, built on the grounds of the extensive Neuer Garten on the shores of the Heiliger See. The palace was commissioned by King Frederick William II of Prussia and designed in the early Neoclassical style by the architects Carl von Gontard and Carl Gotthard Langhans. Despite the name, brick is the main material. The palace remained in use by the Hohenzollern family until the early 20th century. It served as a military museum under communist rule, but has since been restored and is once again open to the public.

== Building history ==
The Marmorpalais was designed by the architects Carl von Gontard and (from 1789) Carl Gotthard Langhans, the designer of Berlin's Brandenburg Gate.

The Marmorpalais was reserved as a summer residence for the private use of the king, who had an artistic temperament. With this new construction the nephew and successor of Frederick the Great dissociated himself from his childless uncle, whom he disliked and who favored earlier Baroque and Rococo forms.

The red brick Marmorpalais was originally a two-story square building. A fine view of the surrounding gardens and lakes is possible from a round pavilion on the flat roof of the cubical structure. Among other buildings, the little castle on the Pfaueninsel in the Havel river was constructed as an eye-catcher. A stairway and gallery accessed from the roof lead into the belvedere. Sculptured putti carrying a basket of fruit decorate the tip of the pavilion. The palace got its name from the grey and white Silesian marble used for the decorative elements and partitioning structures.

Boat moorings could be approached by members of the court via a large terrace on the lake side of the palace, from which a stairway led down to the water. The king enjoyed extensive boat rides; even Charlottenburg Palace on the Spree river in Berlin could be reached by boat from here.

On the nearby lake shore is to be found the palace kitchen, which was built 1788–1790 by Langhans in the romantic style of a half-sunken classical temple ruin. An underground corridor provides a connection with an artificial grotto on the ground floor of the palace which served as a dining room in summertime.

The Marmorpalais is closely associated with Wilhelmine Enke (also spelled Encke), known popularly as "Beautiful Wilhelmine". As Frederick William II's mistress she had a great influence on the interior decoration of the palace; in 1796 she was made Countess Lichtenau.

After only a few years of use the palace was considered to be too small, and in 1797 construction started on two side wings designed by Michael Philipp Boumann. The architect connected these single-story, rectangular extensions to the right and left of the main entrance on the garden side of the palace with galleries in the form of quarter circles. The marble required to decorate these extensions was obtained by removing Frederick William's colonnades from Park Sanssouci and incorporating the pillars in the new building. This garden architecture designed by Georg Wenzeslaus von Knobelsdorff had originally stood on the main boulevard connecting Sanssouci Palace and the New Palace.

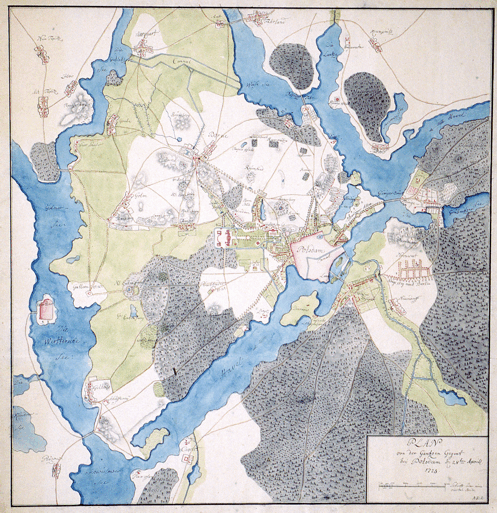
Historical map of the Potsdam surroundings, 1773. Heiliger See is the small lake in the NE quadrant

When the king died in November 1797, just the shell of the extensions had been completed. His son and successor, Frederick William III of Prussia, being uninterested in the project, only had the exterior finished.

This was still the situation in the 1830s when Prince Wilhelm (William), later Kaiser William I, and his spouse Augusta moved into the Marmorpalais while they awaited the completion of their new residence at Babelsberg Palace (1833–1835–1849). His brother, King Frederick William IV of Prussia, known as "a royal nostalgic romanticist", commissioned the architect Ludwig Ferdinand Hesse to complete the unfinished interior structure and fittings for the two side extensions between 1843 and 1848. Frescos with scenes from the Nibelungenlied were added to the outside to decorate the colonnade walls.

The building's technical and sanitary facilities were updated when Prince Wilhelm (William), later Kaiser Wilhelm II, and his family lived in the Marmorpalais from 1881 until he acceded to the throne in 1888.

The last royal inhabitants of the Marmorpalais were Prince Wilhelm, eldest son of Kaiser Wilhelm II, and his spouse Cecilie, who lived there for most of the year between 1904 and 1917, when they moved to nearby Cecilienhof Palace, built for them in the Neuer Garten.

After the German monarchy came to an end in 1918, the Marmorpalais was placed under the control of the Prussian palaces administration in 1926 as a result of a settlement between the Free State of Prussia and the Hohenzollern family regarding property claims. It opened as a palace museum in 1932, with restored interior furnishings from the 18th and 19th centuries.

Toward the end of World War II the palace suffered serious damage when the north wing was hit by an incendiary bomb, and the main building by a grenade. Its condition further deteriorated after the war, over a period of time when the Soviet Red Army used it as a venue for an officers' mess, beginning in 1946.

In 1961, the East German GDR Army Museum was established in the building. Inside, historic military equipment, uniforms and historic documents were on display and on the outside, cannon, a T-34 tank, a high-speed patrol boat, a MiG fighter airplane and a rocket were exhibited. The weapons were removed in 1989.

Starting in 1984, the National People's Army made plans for a fundamental restoration as the building continued to fall into disrepair. These plans came to fruition in 1988 and the work continued in late autumn 1990 after the return of the property to the palaces administration. Since 14 April 2006 all 40 rooms have been renovated and opened to the public. Repair of the exterior surface was completed in autumn 2009 after several years of restoration work.

Since 1990, the Marmorpalais has been part of the UNESCO World Heritage Site "Palaces and Parks of Potsdam and Berlin" because of its architectural harmony with the nearby gardens and its testimony to the power of Prussia in the 18th and 19th centuries. The palace is administered by the Stiftung Preußische Schlösser und Gärten Berlin-Brandenburg.

== The interior rooms ==
Beginning in 1790, Carl Gotthard Langhans was commissioned with designing the interior rooms. Marble fireplaces and antique sculpture were a prominent feature in decisions about the decorative furnishings; these had been purchased in Italy for the Marmorpalais by the architect Friedrich Wilhelm von Erdmannsdorff. This Saxon nobleman, who was already famous for planning and executing early Neoclassical buildings in Dessau-Wörlitz, had been invited to work in Berlin in 1787.

On the ground floor of the main building there is a vestibule leading to a stairway extending the entire height of the building. Behind it is a large room designed as a grotto and used in the summertime as a dining room. This room is situated on the eastern side of the palace and faces the lake. Because of its shady location and the calm, cool effect of its greyish blue marble paneling its occupants enjoyed a pleasant room climate. On either side of this middle axis there were six private rooms serving as royal living quarters.

Upstairs, the rooms are grouped around the central marble stairway. The largest room, the concert hall, extended across the entire lake side of the palace. It was later used as a salon during the reign of the German Kaisers. The furnishings and decorative architecture of the rooms reflected a taste for the Neoclassical style, the only exception being the so-called Oriental cabinet on the upper floor, which Langhans designed as a Turkish tent with a divan.

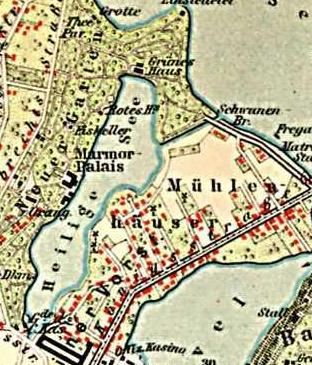
Detail from a 1900 map of Potsdam showing the location of the Marmorpalais

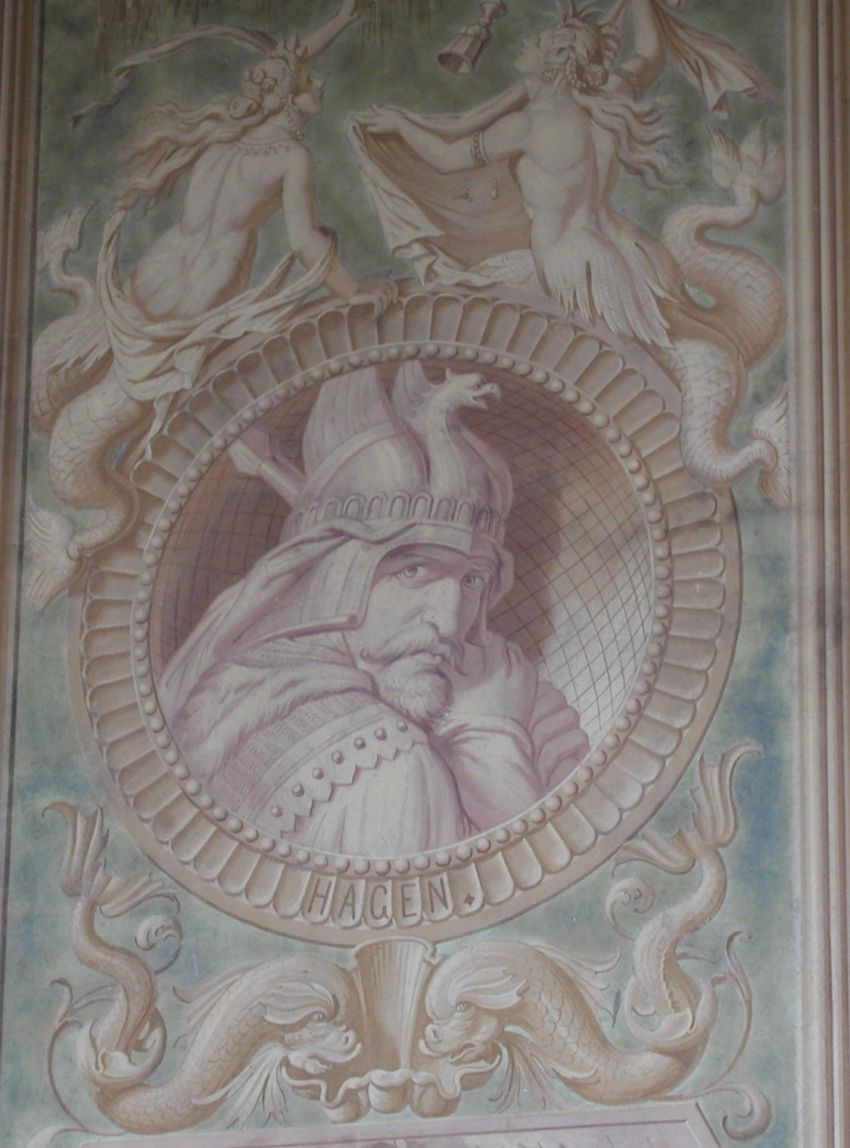
Hagen from the Nibelungenlied, fresco detail from the colonnade

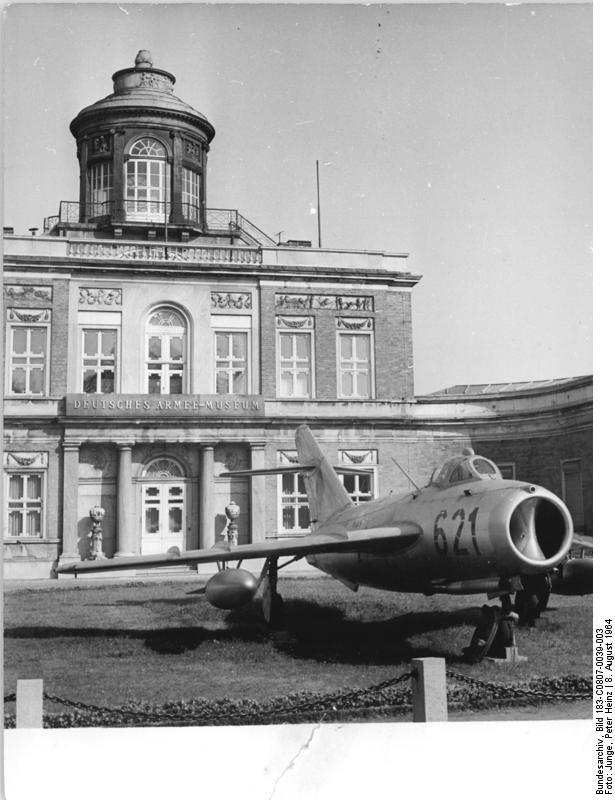
The Marmorpalais in 1964 in use as German Army Museum with a Soviet MiG-17 fighter plane in the courtyard

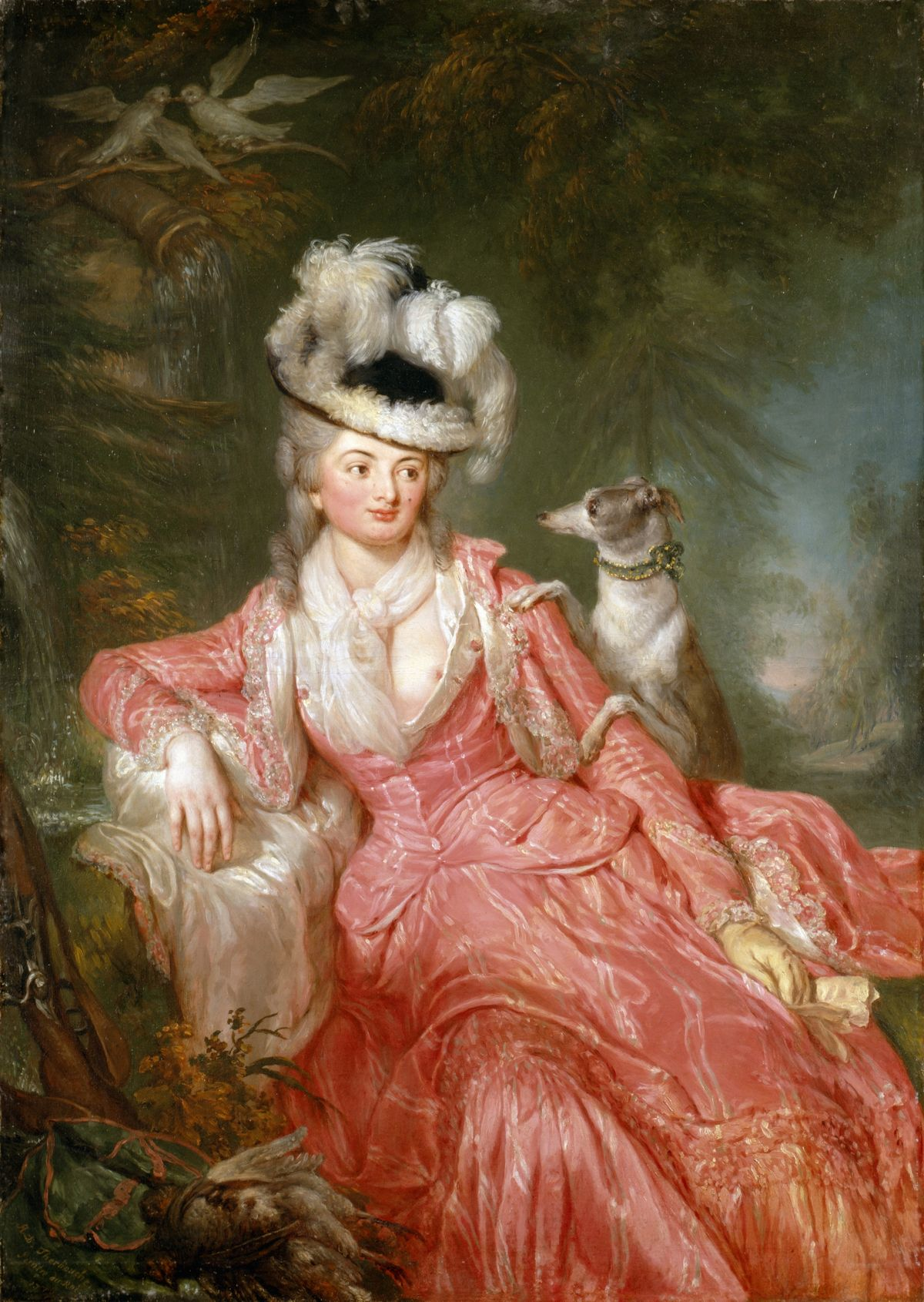
Wilhelmine von Lichtenau

== See also ==
- List of castles in Berlin and Brandenburg
- Palaces and Parks of Potsdam and Berlin
