= Weißer See =

Weißer See (literally "White Lake") may refer to:

- Weißer See (Potsdam)
- Weißer See (Berlin)
- Weißer See (Kargow)

== See also ==
- Weissensee (disambiguation) (Weißensee)
- White Lake (disambiguation)
