= Lake Beloye (disambiguation) =

Lake Beloye (Russian: Белое озеро, literally meaning White Lake) is a lake in the northwestern part of Vologda Oblast in Russia.

Lake Beloye may also refer to:

- Lake Beloye (Beshankovichy Raion), Belarus

In Russia:

- Lake Beloye (Chuvashia)
- Lake Beloye (Nizhny Novgorod Oblast)
- Lake Beloye (Ryazan Oblast)

== See also ==
- White Lake (disambiguation)
