= Schönwalde-Glien =

- Municipality
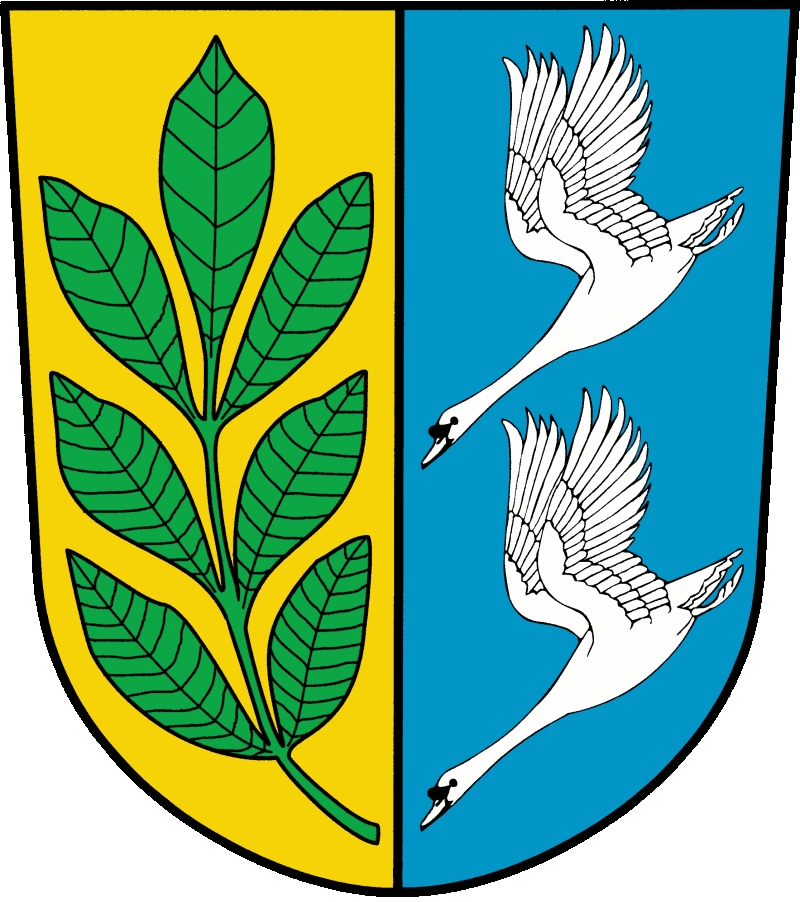
- Coat of arms

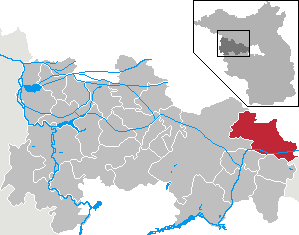
- Location of Schönwalde-Glien within Havelland district
- Interactive map of Schönwalde-Glien
- Location within Germany Location within Brandenburg
- Coordinates: 52°39′N 12°59′E
- Country: Germany
- State: Brandenburg
- District: Havelland
- Subdivisions: 7 Ortsteile

Government
  - Mayor (2019–27): Bodo Oehme (CDU)

Area
  - Total: 96.56 km^{2} (37.28 sq mi)
- Elevation: 31 m (102 ft)

Population (2025-12-31)
  - Total: 10,468
  - Density: 108.4/km^{2} (280.8/sq mi)
- Time zone: UTC+01:00 (CET)
  - Summer (DST): UTC+02:00 (CEST)
- Postal codes: 14621
- Dialling codes: 03322, 033230, 033231
- Vehicle registration: HVL
- Website: Schönwalde-Glien

Schönwalde-Glien is a municipality in the Havelland district, in Brandenburg, Germany.

== History ==
The municipality shared its borders with the former West Berlin, and so during the period 1961-1990 it was separated from it by the Berlin Wall.

In 1951–2, the Havel Canal was constructed through the municipality to link Hennigsdorf with Paretz, thus avoiding a passage through the reach of the River Havel, between Spandau and Potsdam, that was under the political control of West Berlin. The single lock on the canal is located at Schönwalde. The canal is still in use, providing a shorter route for shipping from west of Berlin to the Oder–Havel Canal and Poland.

== Geography ==
The municipality covers an area mainly north of the Havel Canal, north west of Spandau Forest (Berlin-Spandau) and about 10 km north east of Nauen. Only its most densely populated quarter, Schönwalde-Siedlung, is situated south of the Havel Canal and shares an immediate border with Berlin-Spandau. Schönwalde-Glien is part of the Osthavelland-Spandau Regional Park and formerly the Krämer Forst Regional Park. The municipality is situated at the south eastern fringes of the Glien ground moraine and encompasses part of the Krämer Forest in the north.

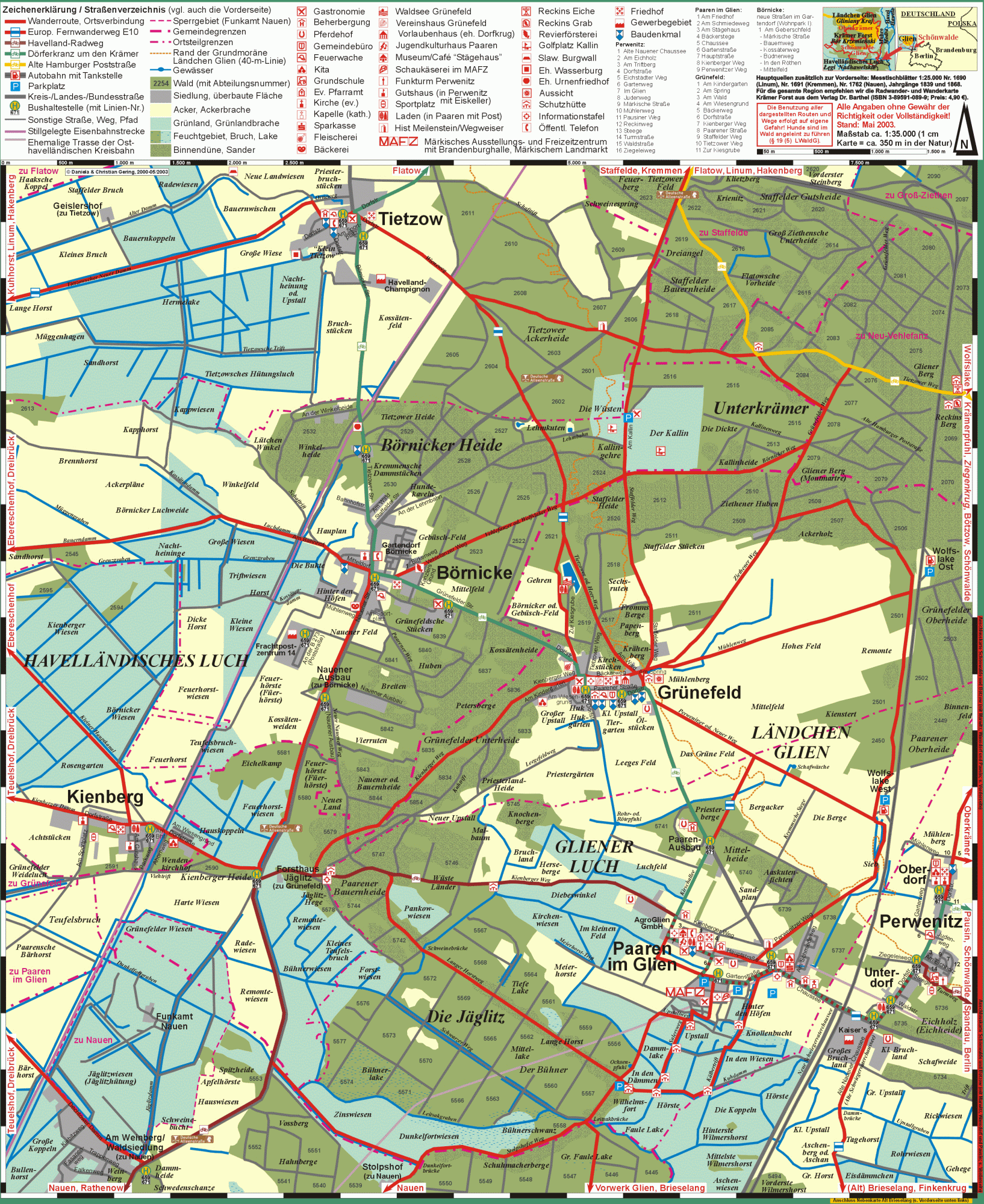
Map of the Schönwalde-Glien municipality, western part

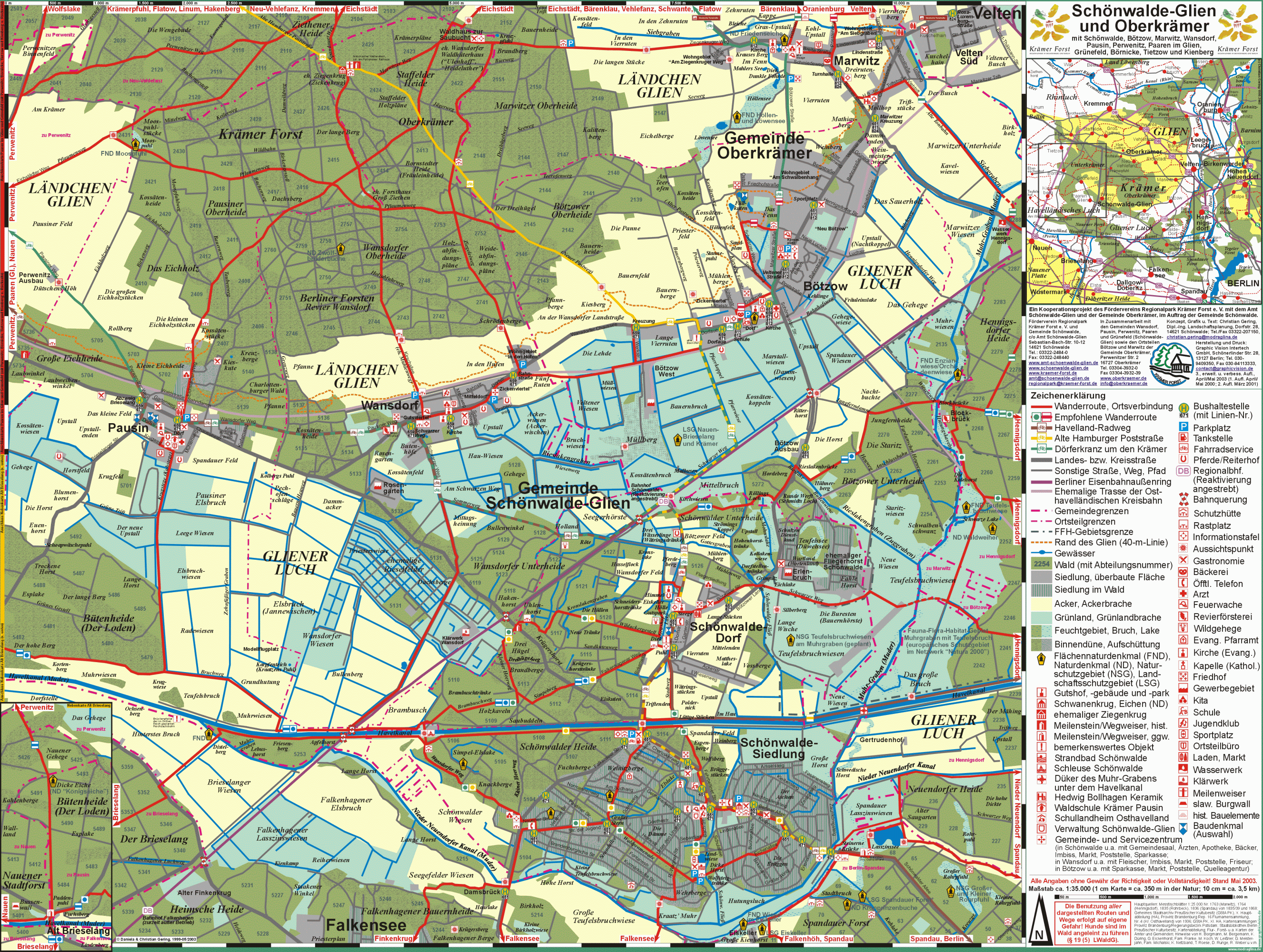
Map of the Schönwalde-Glien municipality, eastern part

== Administrative division ==
The Schönwalde-Glien consists of following quarters:

- Grünefeld (470)
- Paaren im Glien (634)
- Pausin (931)
- Perwenitz (474)
- Schönwalde-Dorf (938)
- Schönwalde-Siedlung (5,034)
- Wansdorf (877)

(inhabitants as of 31 December 2014 according to the web site of the municipality)

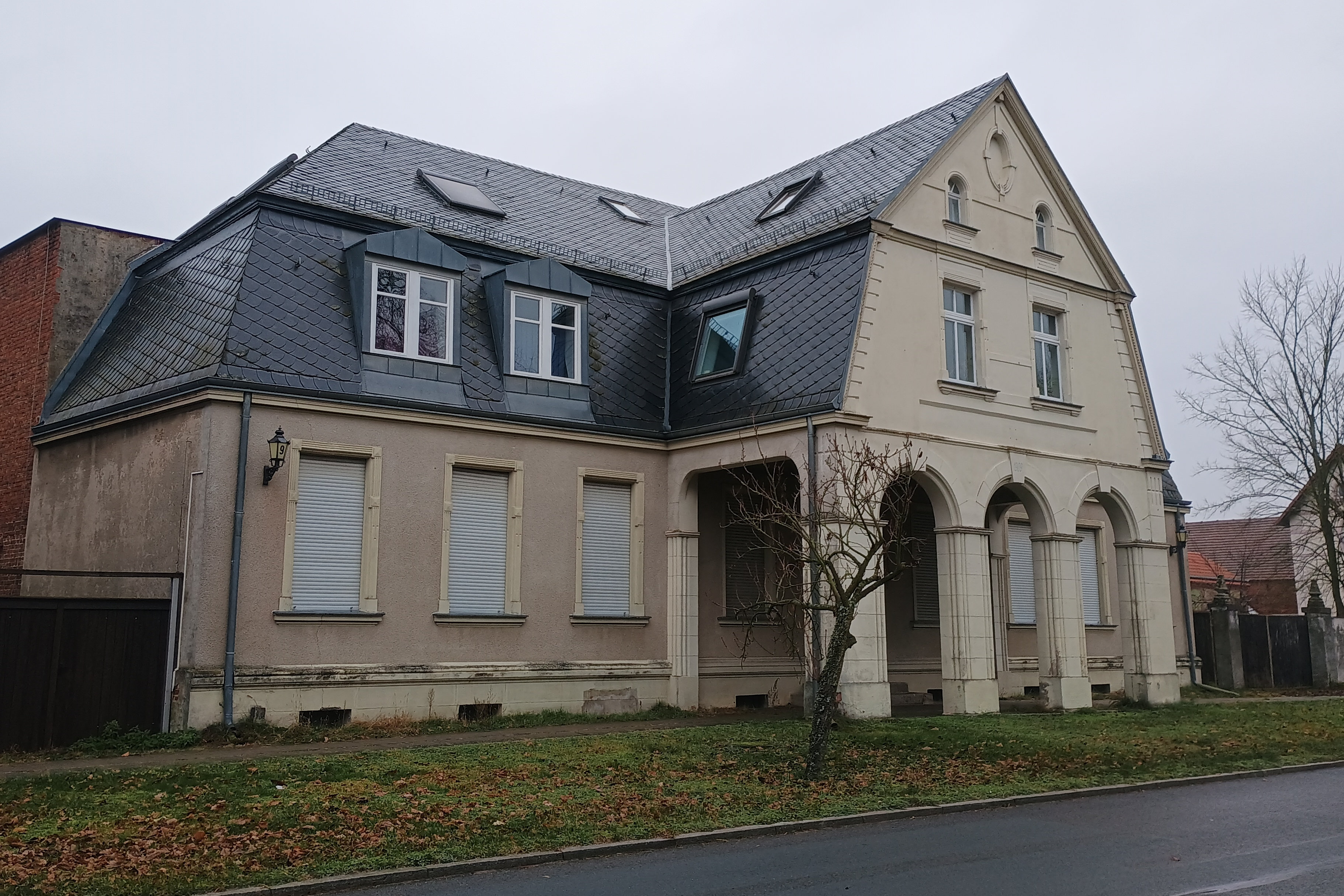
Alcove house in Grünefeld

== Demography ==
Development of Population since 1875 within the current Boundaries (Blue Line: Population; Dotted Line: Comparison to Population Development of Brandenburg state; Grey Background: Time of Nazi rule; Red Background: Time of Communist rule)

Recent Population Development and Projections (Population Development before Census 2011 (blue line); Recent Population Development according to the Census in Germany in 2011 (blue bordered line); Official projections for 2005-2030 (yellow line); for 2017-2030 (scarlet line); for 2020-2030 (green line)

Schönwalde-Glien: Population development
within the current boundaries (2020)

Year	Pop.	±% p.a.
1875	2,779	—
1890	3,065	+0.66%
1910	2,967	−0.16%
1925	3,113	+0.32%
1939	6,000	+4.80%
1950	7,412	+1.94%
1964	6,829	−0.58%

Year	Pop.	±% p.a.
1971	6,725	−0.22%
1981	5,913	−1.28%
1985	5,751	−0.69%
1990	5,423	−1.17%
1995	5,463	+0.15%
2000	7,286	+5.93%
2005	8,487	+3.10%

Year	Pop.	±% p.a.
2010	8,931	+1.03%
2015	9,351	+0.92%
2016	9,514	+1.74%
2017	9,498	−0.17%
2018	9,575	+0.81%
2019	9,864	+3.02%
2020	10,017	+1.55%
