= Sacrow–Paretz Canal =

Coordinates: 52°27′N 12°54′E

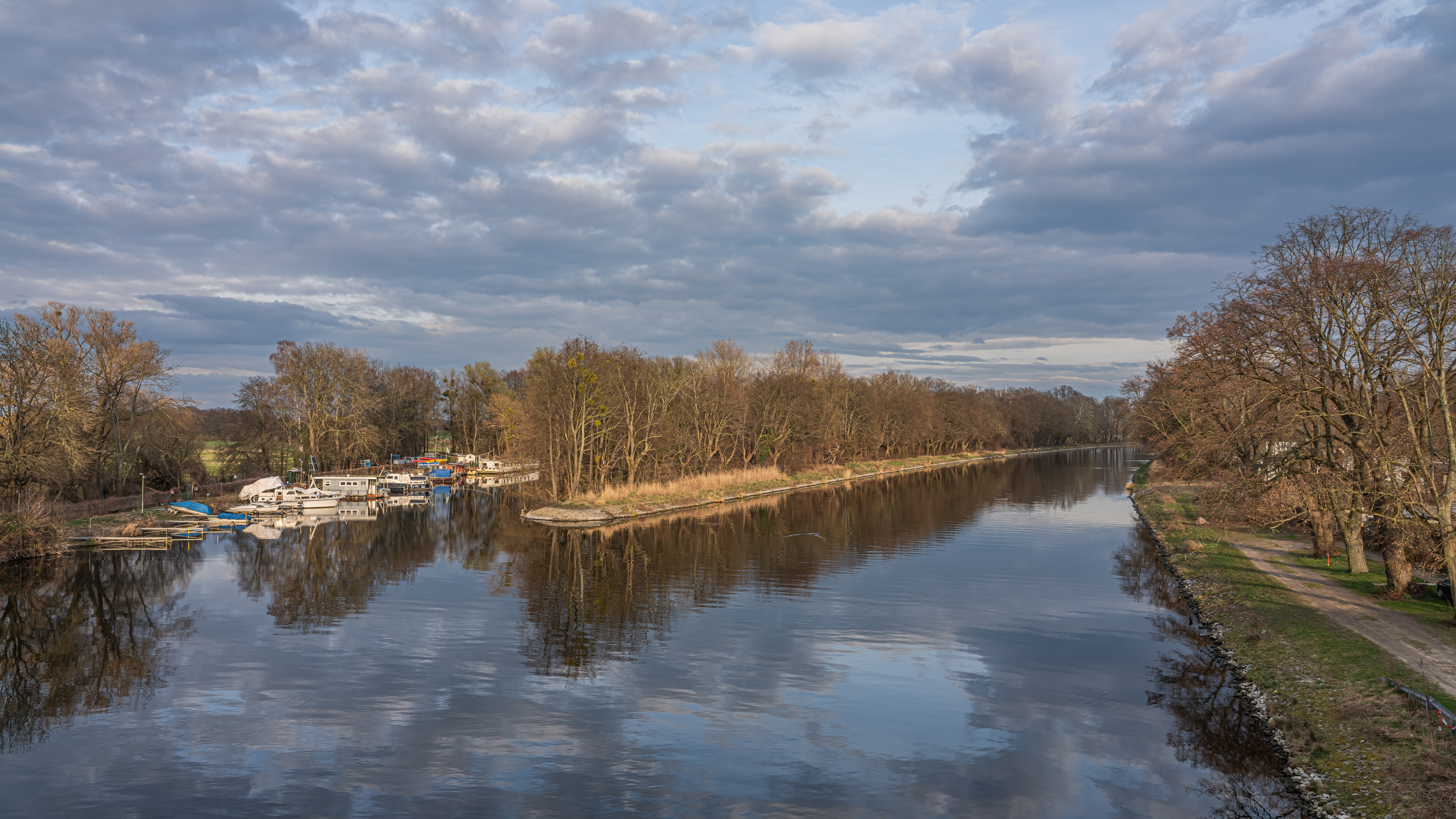
The Sacrow–Paretz Canal

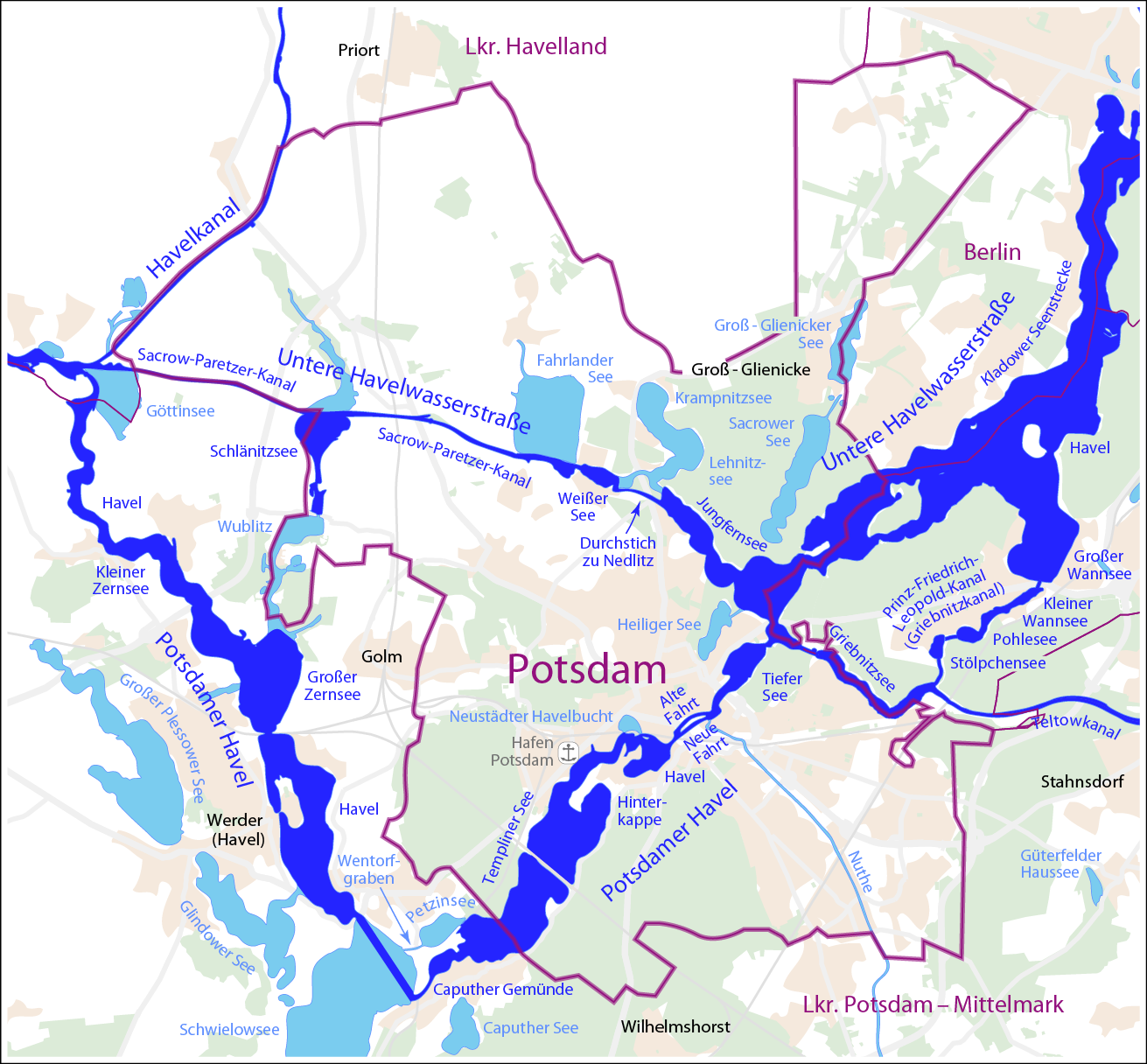
Map showing alternative routes via the Sacrow–Paretz Canal (centre-left) and River Havel (lower-left)

The Sacrow–Paretz Canal, or Sacrow-Paretzer-Kanal in German (pronounced [ˈzakʁoː ˈpaːʁɛt͡sɐ kaˈnaːl]), is a canal in the northeastern German state of Brandenburg. It provides a short cut for vessels navigating the River Havel, linking the Jungfernsee, near Potsdam, with Paretz.

Building of the canal began in 1874, and it was opened in 1876. Since then, it has been widened and deepened twice, once between 1888 and 1890, and again in the 1920s. Unlike the Havel Canal, which also provides a short cut for the River Havel, and also has its downstream end at Paretz, both ends of the Sacrow–Paretz Canal are downstream of Berlin.

The canal is 12.5 kilometres (7.8 mi) long, of which 7.5 kilometres (4.7 mi) comprises artificially cut channel, whilst the rest is accounted for by several lakes. Besides the Jungfernsee, these include the Weißer See, the Fahrlander See and the Schlänitzsee. The canal has no locks, and is crossed by four bridges.
