= Fahrlander See =

Lake in Potsdam, Brandenburg, Germany

Fahrlander See Fahrländer See
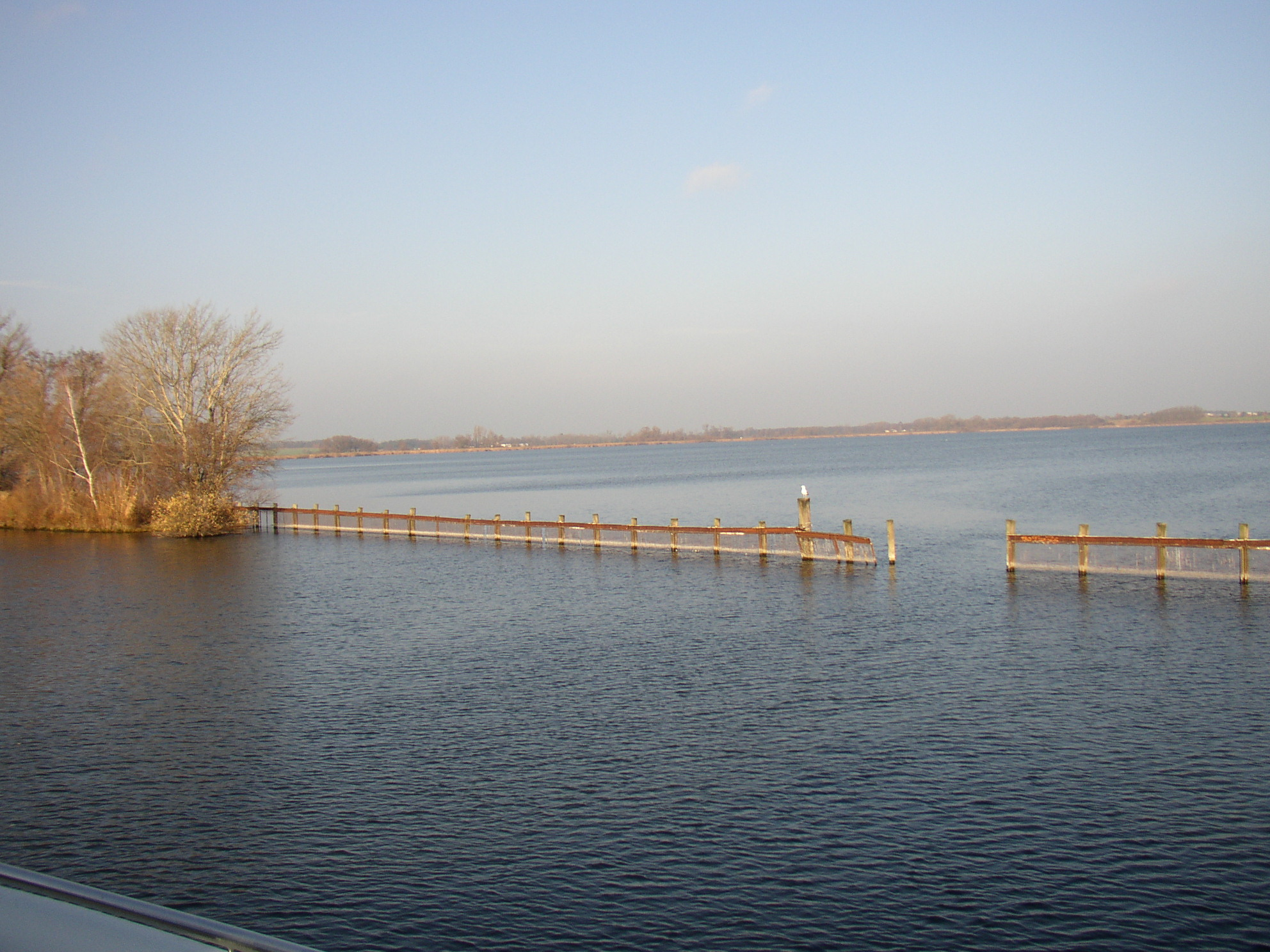

- Location within Brandenburg
- Location: Potsdam, Brandenburg
- Coordinates: 52°27′0″N 13°1′0″E
- Primary inflows: Sacrow–Paretz Canal
- Primary outflows: Sacrow–Paretz Canal
- Basin countries: Germany
- Surface area: 2.105 km^{2} (0.813 sq mi)
- Max. depth: ca. 3 m (9.8 ft)
- Shore length^{1}: 6.1 km (3.8 mi)
- Surface elevation: 29.4 m (96 ft)
- ^{1} Shore length is not a well-defined measure.

Fahrlander See is a lake at Potsdam, Brandenburg, Germany. At an elevation of 29.4 m, its surface area is 2.105 km^{2}. The Sacrow–Paretz Canal flows through the lake.

== See also ==
- Jungfernsee
