= David Gilly =

German architect (1748–1808)

David Gilly, from a frontispiece

David Gilly (7 January 1748 – 5 May 1808) was a German architect and architecture tutor in Prussia, known as the father of the architect Friedrich Gilly.

== Life ==
Born in Schwedt, Gilly was the son of a French-born Huguenot immigrant named Jacques Gilly and his wife Marie Villemain. His brother was the physician Charles Gilly. Already at the age of fifteen, Gilly was working in the gardens on the Netze. Becoming a specialist in building water-features, he was appointed master builder in 1770 (at 22 years of age), and was active between the years 1772 and 1782 in Stargard, Farther Pomerania. Gilly was the first examinee of the newly established Ober-Examinationskommission.

Around 1777, Gilly married Friederike, a daughter of the regimental stable-master Friedrich Ziegenspeck. With her he had two children, Friedrich and Minna (who later married the politician Friedrich Gentz).

In Stargard, Gilly was in 1779 promoted to building director of Pomerania, before being transferred in 1782 to Stettin. As a building director, he designed (among other things) responsibly for the harbour company of Swinemünde and Kolberg. Because Gilly had already made himself widely known among the new generation of newly-qualified architects, he established the "Cameralbau" in Stettin. For King Frederick the Great, he acted as a source of expertise for comprehensive land improvement schemes.

In 1788, Gilly was recalled to Berlin and entered the Oberbaudepartement. There he was promoted that very year to be architectural advisor for the provinces of Pomerania, East Prussia and West Prussia, responsible for Kurmark and Altmark. His appointment as vice director of the construction and inspection department lasted four years. As such, Gilly was from 1792 to 1801 in charge of the building of the Bromberger Canal and the reconstruction and extension of the harbour concern of Danzig and Elbing.

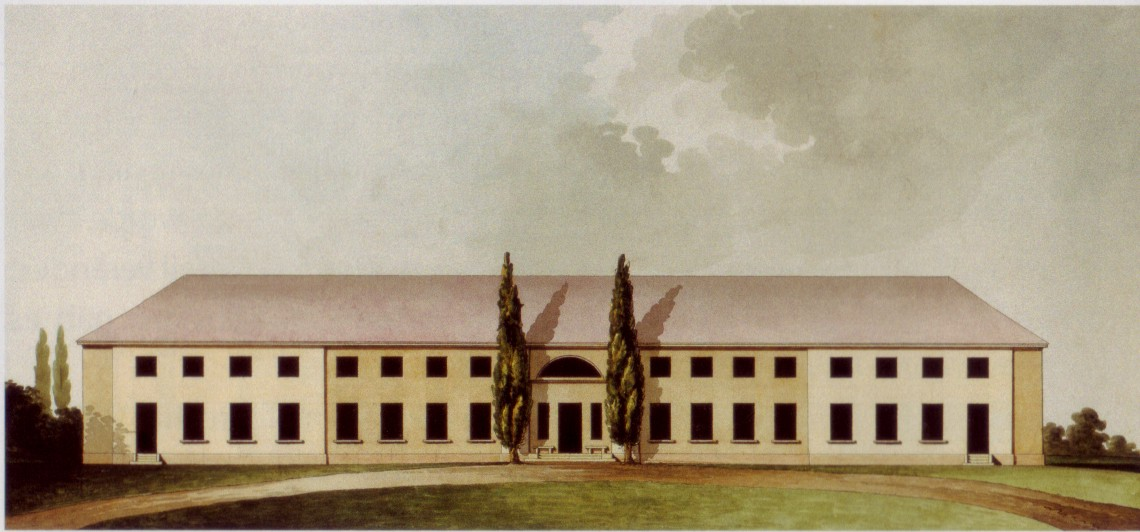
Schloss Paretz, draft of 1797

Gilly later founded a private architectural school in Berlin in 1793 and five years later was one of the co-founders of the Berliner Bauakademie (today the technical university). In these years, Gilly created some of his most beautiful works: in 1796 the country seat at Paretz in Potsdam for King Frederick William III, deliberately simple in design, according to the King's wishes, and two years later the Schloss Freienwalde for Queen Frederica. The most influential late Classicist architect of the time was Carl Gotthard Langhans, director of the royal building commission in Berlin. The younger David Gilly overtook him in terms of modernity, but did not outlive him.

Gilly conceived and erected an office building in Braunschweig for the publisher Friedrich Vieweg in 1801, and almost at the same time he rebuilt Schloss Steinhöfel for the Hofmarschall Valentin von Massow.

He and his son, the architect Friedrich Gilly, were teachers of the young Karl Friedrich Schinkel who would dominate the next generation of Prussian architects. When on 3 August 1800 his son Friedrich died, David Gilly lost his creative impulse, even finding no pleasure in a short study trip to Paris in 1803/04. His wife Friederike died in 1804 and after the obligatory year of mourning, Gilly married her sister, Juliane Ziegenspeck.

At the age of 60, on 5 May 1808, Gilly died in Berlin, a few months before Langhans. His grave in Berlin in the Protestant Friedhof II der Jerusalems- und Neuen Kirchengemeinde (Cemetery No. II of the congregations of Jerusalem's Church and New Church) was rediscovered and renovated in 1938.

== Writings ==
- Beschreibung der Feuer abhaltenden Lehmschindeldächer : nebst gesammelten Nachrichten und Erfahrungen über die Bauart mit getrockneten Lehmziegeln. (1794)
- Grundriß zu den Vorlesungen über das Praktische bey verschiedenen Gegenständen der Wasserbaukunst. (1795)
- Vergleichung der verschiedenen Bauarten welche bey Gründung der im Meere erbauten Werke, vorzüglich aber bey Aufführung der Hafen-Wände oder der sogenannten Molen an den See-Häfen, gebräuchlich sind. (1796)
- Sammlung nützlicher Aufsätze und Nachrichten. (1797)
- Ueber Erfindung, Construction und Vortheile der Bohlen-Dächer. (1797)
- Handbuch der Landbaukunst. (1798, 2. Aufl. 1800, 3. Aufl. 1805, 4. Aufl. 1818, 5. Aufl. 1822)
- Kurze Anleitung auf welche Art Blitzableiter an den Gebäuden anzubringen sind. (1798, 2. Aufl. 1802)
- Abriss der Cameral-Bauwissenschaft. (1799)
- Praktische Anleitung zur Anwendung des Nivellirens oder Wasserwägens in den bey der Landeskultur vorkommenden gewöhnlichsten Fällen. (1800, 2. Aufl. 1804, 3. Aufl. 1827)
- Praktische Anweisung zur Wasserbaukunst. (1802, 2. Aufl. 1809)
- Über die Gründung der Gebäude auf ausgemauerte Brunnen. (1804)
- Sammlung von Aufsätzen und Nachrichten die Baukunst betreffend (This collection counts as one of the first trade-journals written by a builder.)

== Buildings ==
- Schloss Steinhöfel
- Gutshaus Kleinmachnow 1796-1803
- Schloss and village Paretz 1797-1805
- Schloss Freienwalde
- Vieweghaus Braunschweig 1798-1804 (npw the Braunschweigisches Landesmuseum)

== Images ==
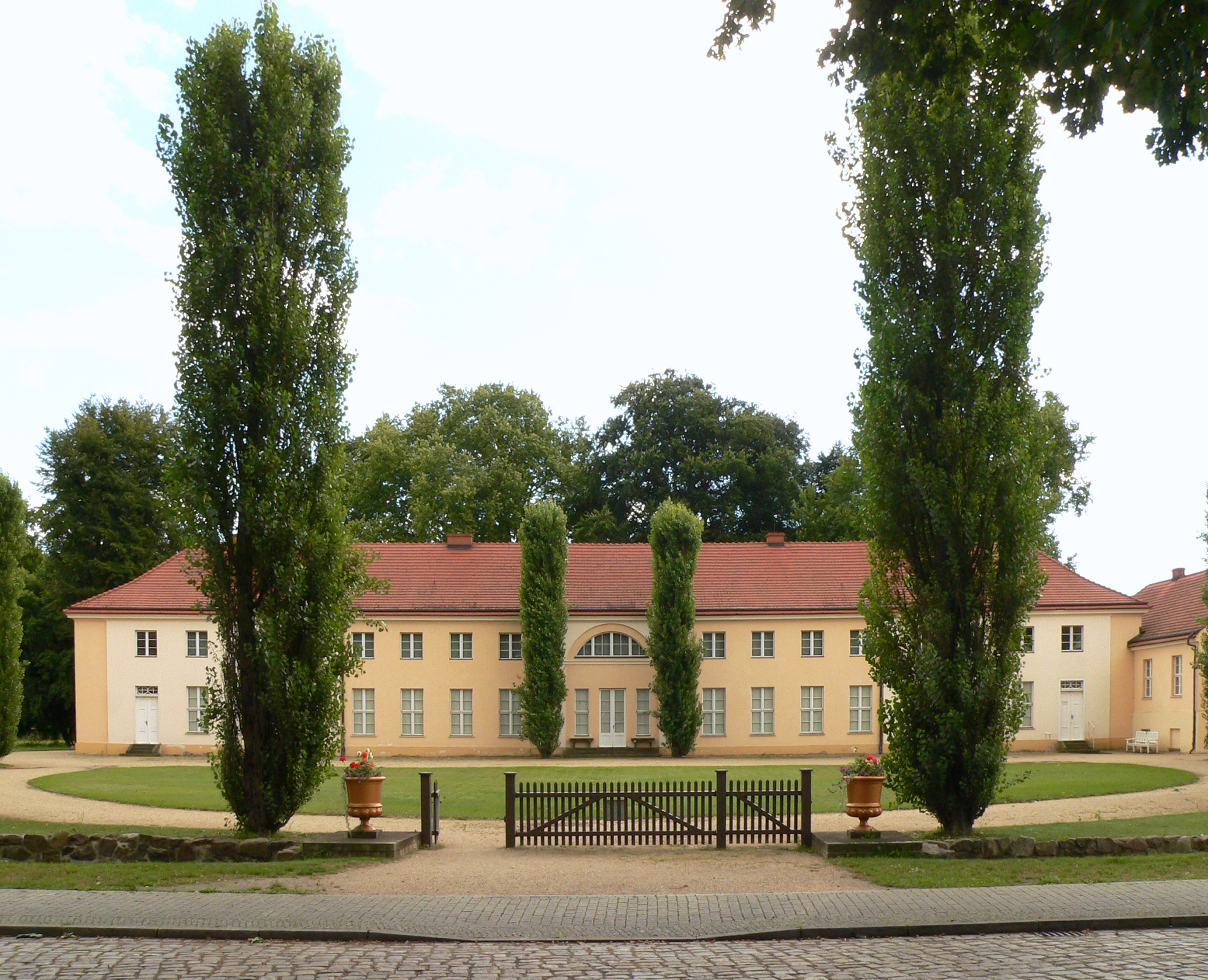
Schloss Paretz, 1797

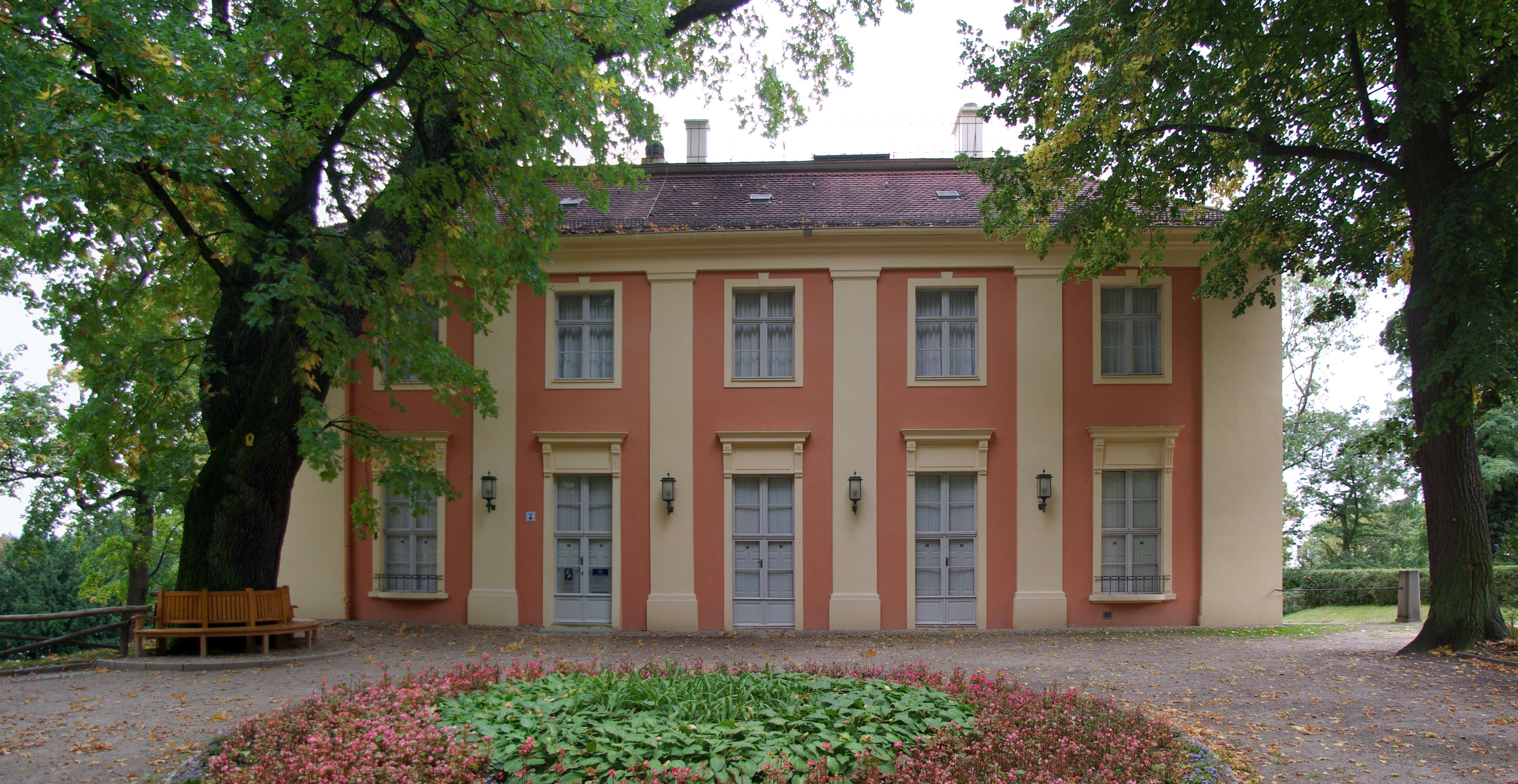
Schloss Freienwalde, 1798

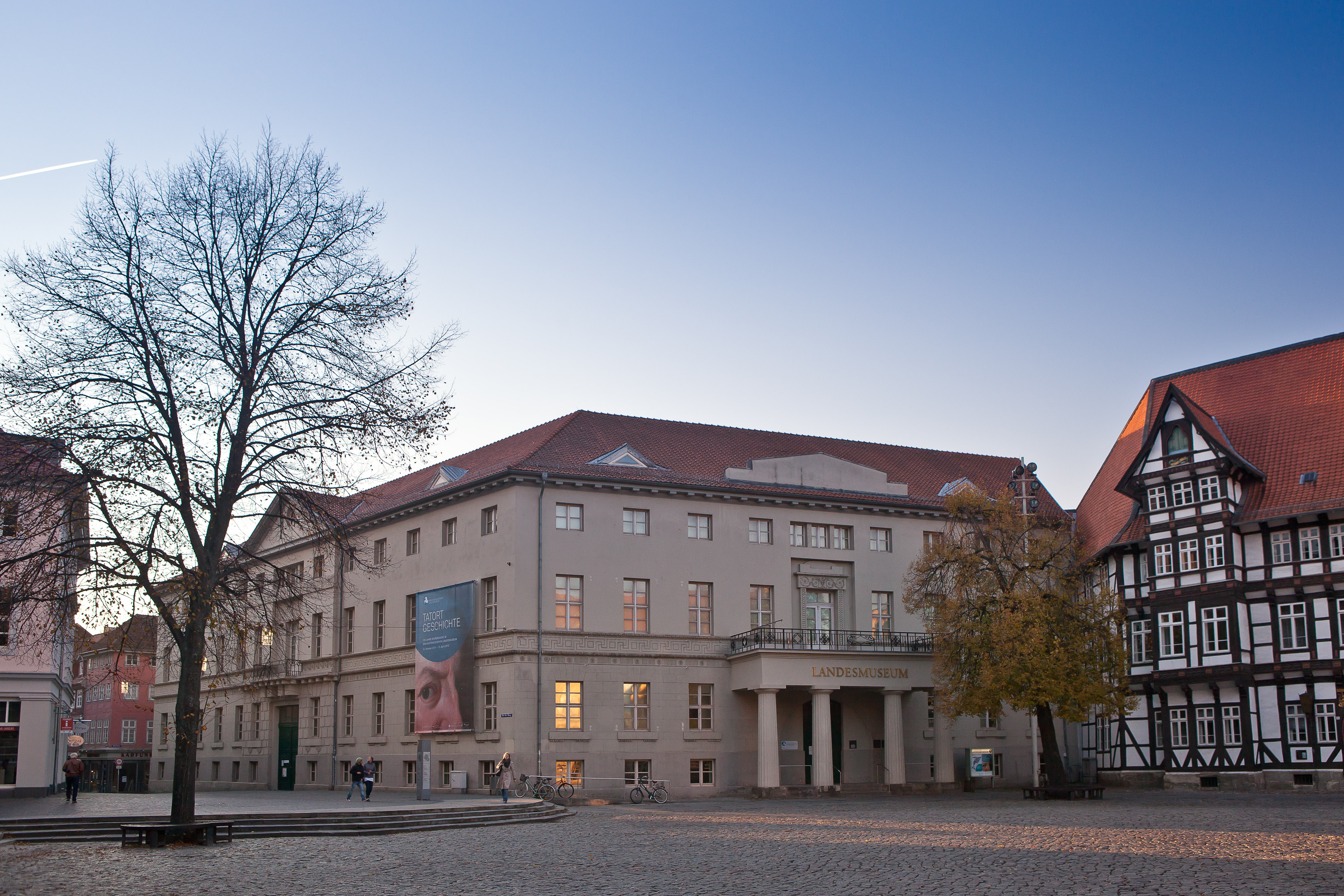
Vieweg-Haus, Braunschweig, 1799

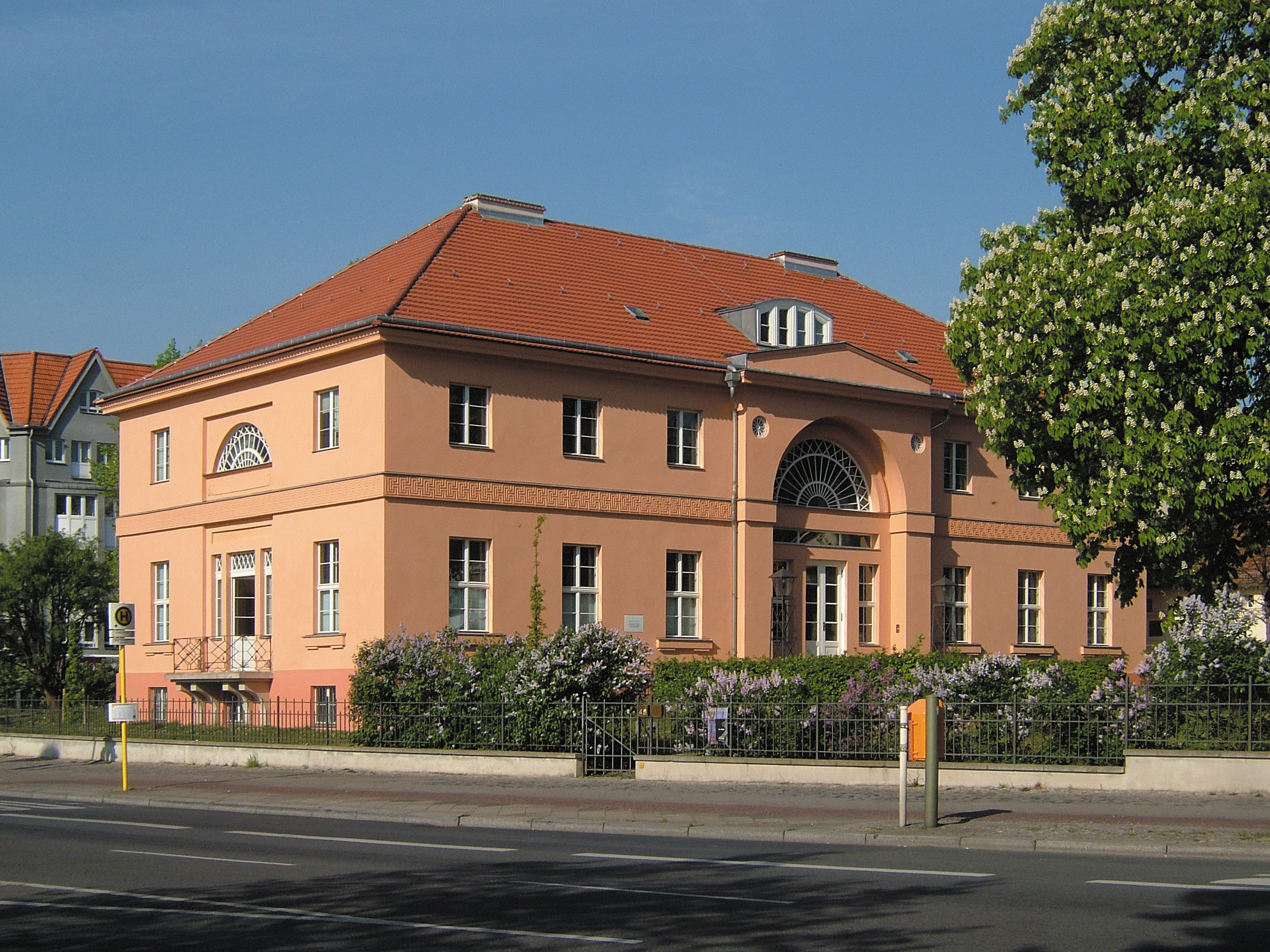
Steglitz manor house, 1804

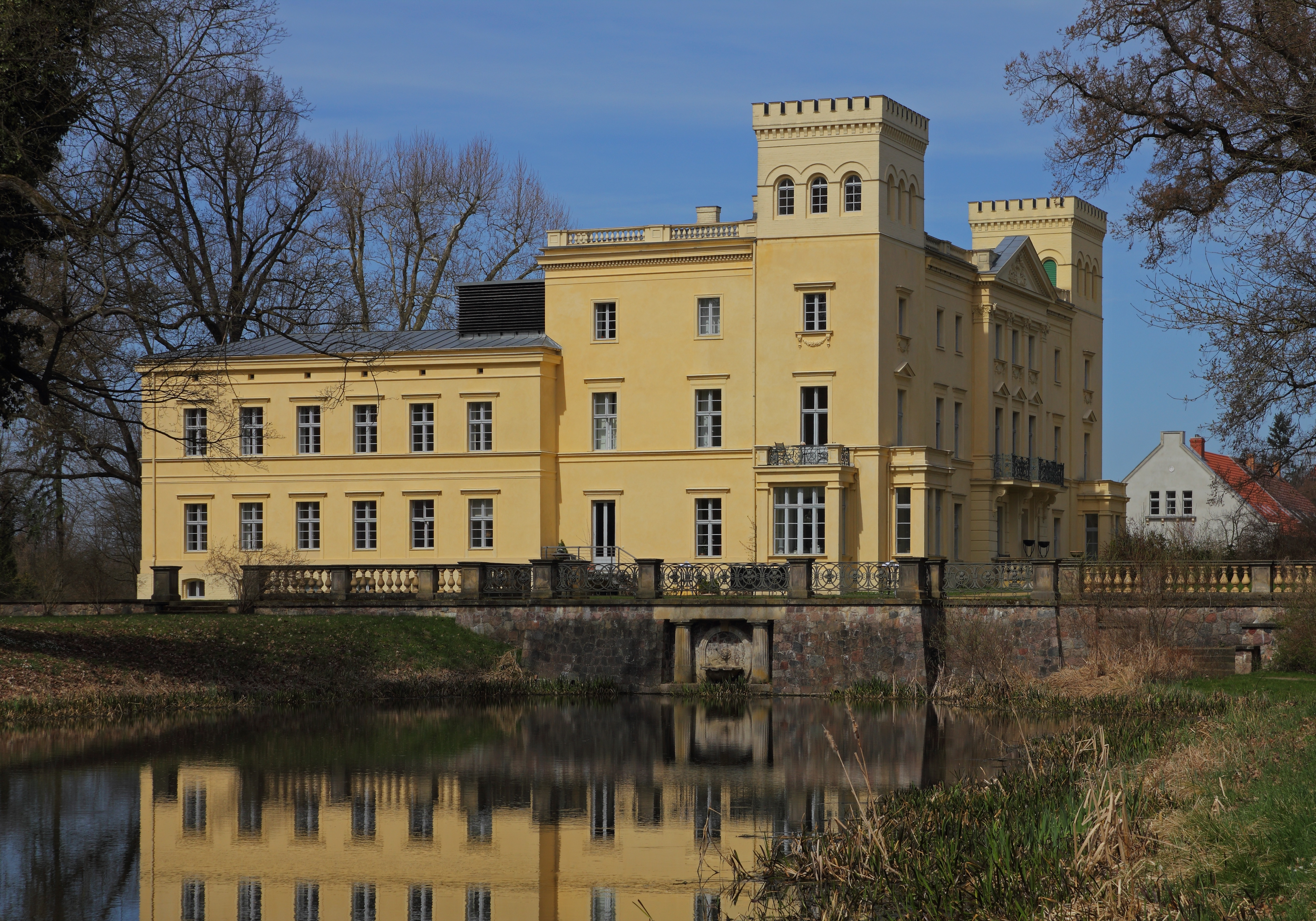
Steinhöfel manor house

== Bibliography ==
- Denkmal der Liebe und Verehrung: ihrem verewigten Lehrer Herrn David Gilly ... gewidmet von den studirenden Mitgliedern der Königlichen Bau-Akademie zu Berlin. (1808)
- Kahlow, Andreas (Hrsg.): Vom Schönen und Nützlichen. : David Gilly (1748–1808); Exhibition catalogue - Berlin : Stiftung Preußischer Schlösser und Gärten Berlin-Brandenburgs, 1998
- Lammert, Marlies: David Gilly.. - Berlin : Mann, 1981. - ISBN 3-7861-1317-3 (Repr. d. Ausg. Berlin 1964)
- Schmitz, Hermann: Berliner Baumeister.. - Berlin : Mann, 1980. - ISBN 3-7861-1272-X (Repr. d. Ausg. Berlin 1925)
