= Weißensee =

Weißensee (German: white lake) may refer to:

== Places ==
- Weissensee (Berlin), a district of Berlin
- Weißensee, Thuringia, a town in Thuringia, Germany
- Weissensee, Austria, a municipality in Carinthia, Austria
- Weissensee (Carinthia), a lake in Carinthia, Austria
- Weißensee (Füssen), a lake in Allgäu, Bavaria, Germany
- Weißensee, the former German name for Błażejewko, Poznań County, Greater Poland Voivodeship, west-central Poland

== People ==
- Friedrich Weissensee (c.1560–1622), German composer and Protestant minister

== Other ==
- Weissensee, a song by Neu! from their eponymous first album
- Weissensee, a song by Elder_(band) from their 2019 album The Gold & Silver Sessions
- Weissensee (TV series), a German television series

== See also ==
- White Lake (disambiguation)
