= Leonhardt Schröter =

German Renaissance choirmaster, teacher and composer

- Born: c. 1532; Torgau
- Died: c. 1601 (aged 68–69); Magdeburg
- Occupations: composer; choirmaster; librarian

Leonhardt Schröter (c. 1532 – c. 1601) was a German Renaissance choirmaster, teacher, and composer at Magdeburg.

== Biography ==
Leonhardt (alternatively spelled "Leonhard" or "Leonhart") Schröter (or Schroeter) was born in Torgau. His education began in Torgau where one of his teachers was Johann Walter. His subsequent education included schools at Annaberg-Buchholz and following at the Meissen ducal school. By at least 1561 until 1571, he occupied the position of town Kantor (director of church music) in Saalfeld. He was removed from this position because of his Philippist sympathies, whereupon he became librarian for the Wolfenbüttel court. He was restored to his position at Saalfeld two years later. Sometime later, he was hired to teach at the Old City School in Magdeburg. His last and most prestigious post was as Kantor at the Alstadt Lateinschule in Magdeburg. He is thought to have died sometime around the year 1601, based on an inscription in Friedrich Weissensee’s “Opus Melicum” from 1602, which describes Schröter's recent death.

== Works ==
Schröter composed carols, hymns, motets, a passion, psalms, and a Te Deum which date from 1571 to 1587. He also composed several part-songs dating from 1562, which have been noted for their contrapuntal ability. His style has been described as having the “greatest simplicity”, but also the “highest grandeur,” simultaneously simple and sublime. He employed Reformation polyphony in his chorale settings, and also homophony, most notably in his eight-voice double-choir settings. His choral settings of psalms, while not numerous, are considered an "important contribution" to the Protestant motet tradition.
