= White Lake =

White Lake or Whitelake may refer to:

== Populated places ==
=== Canada ===
- White Lake, Ontario

=== United States ===
- White Lake, Oneida County, New York
- White Lake, Sullivan County, New York
- White Lake, North Carolina
- White Lake, South Dakota
- White Lake, Wisconsin
- White Lake Township, Michigan

== Lakes ==
=== Canada ===
- White Lake Provincial Park, British Columbia
- White Lake Provincial Park (Ontario)
- White Lake (Ontario)

=== Hungary ===
- Lake Fehér (disambiguation)

=== Ireland ===
- White Lough, also known as White Lake

=== Poland ===
- Białe Jezioro (disambiguation) ("White Lake"), 17 lakes in Poland
- Jezioro Białe (disambiguation) ("White Lake"), 13 lakes in Poland

=== United States ===
- White Lake (Oneida County, New York)
- White Lake (Onondaga County, New York)
- White Lake (Michigan), the name of several lakes in Michigan, including:
  - White Lake (White Lake Township, Michigan)
- White Lake State Park in Tamworth, New Hampshire
- Lake White State Park in Pike County, Ohio

== Other ==
- White Lake (film), a 1989 documentary film by Colin Browne
- Whitelake (album), by Enter the Haggis
- White Lake Mountain in New York
- Whitelake River, Somerset Levels, England

== See also ==
- Lac Blanc (disambiguation) ("White Lake"), several in France
- Lago Bianco ("White Lake"), Grisons, Switzerland
- Lake Beloye (disambiguation) ("White Lake"), several in Russia
- Tsagaannuur (disambiguation) ("White Lake"), several in Mongolia
- Weißensee (disambiguation) ("White Lake"), several in Austria, Germany
