= Lac Blanc =

Lac Blanc or Blanc Lake may refer to:

- Blanc Lake (Saint-Ubalde), a lake in Saint-Ubalde, Quebec, Canada
- Lac Blanc (Chamonix), a lake in Haute-Savoie, France
- Lac Blanc (Vosges), a lake in Haut-Rhin, France
- Lac-Blanc, Quebec, an unorganized territory in Quebec, in Canada

== See also ==
- White Lake (disambiguation)
