= Friedrich Gilly =

German architect (1772–1800)

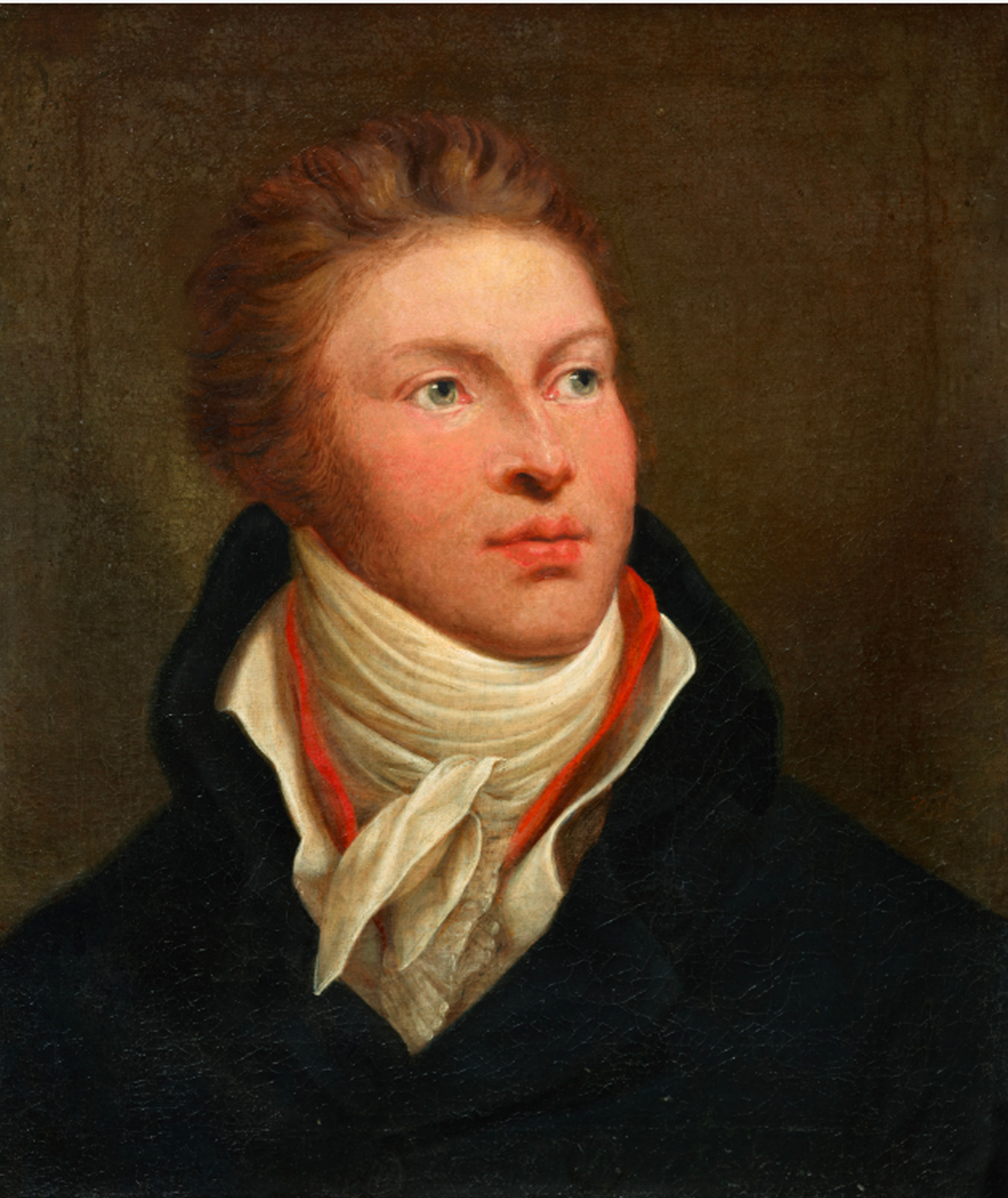
- Friedrich Gilly
- Born: Friedrich David Gilly; 16 February 1772; Altdamm, Pomerania
- Died: 3 August 1800 (aged 28); Karlsbad
- Occupation: architect

Friedrich David Gilly (16 February 1772 – 3 August 1800) was a German architect and the son of the architect David Gilly. His works are influenced by revolutionary architecture (Revolutionsarchitektur). Born in Altdamm, Pomerania, (today Dąbie, district of Szczecin, Poland), Gilly was known as a prodigy and the teacher of the young Karl Friedrich Schinkel.

In 1788 he enrolled at the Akademie der Bildenden Künste in Berlin. His teachers in architecture were Friedrich Becherer and Carl Gotthard Langhans. Gilly enjoyed drawing lessons with Christian Bernhard Rode, Johann Christoph Frisch, Johann Heinrich Meil, Daniel Nikolaus Chodowiecki and Johann Gottfried Schadow. In the practical part, he was taught by Carl Gotthard Langhans, Michael Philipp Boumann and Baron Friedrich Wilhelm von Erdmannsdorff.

He was first employed by the Oberhofbauamt in 1789, and worked for a time with Bernhard Matthias Brasch on the reconstruction of Neuruppin.

In 1797, Gilly travelled extensively in France, England, and Austria. The drawings he made in France reveal his interests in architecture and reflect the intellectual climate of the Directoire. They include views of the Fountain of Regeneration, the Rue des Colonnes—an arcaded street of baseless Doric columns leading to the Théâtre Feydeau—the chamber of the Conseil des Anciens in the Tuileries and Jean-Jacques Rousseau’s grotto in its landscaped setting at Ermenonville, Oise.

His 1797, design for the Frederick II monument reveals his debt to French neoclassicism, in particular Etienne-Louis Boullée. His explanatory notes indicate that he intended the building to be spiritually uplifting. The plan for the monument is currently part of the collection of the Kupferstichkabinett in Berlin.

From 1799, Schinkel lived in the Gilly household at Berlin and was taught by Friedrich and Friedrich's architect father David Gilly.

Gilly was appointed professor at the Berlin Bauakademie at the age of 26. Of his built designs, only one survives: the ruinous Greek Revival mausoleum (1800–02; destroyed after 1945) at Dyhernfurth near Breslau (now Brzeg Dolny near Wrocław, Poland), in the form of a prostyle Greek temple.

Gilly died from tuberculosis at the age of 28 in Karlsbad, where he was buried in the cemetery of Andreaskapelle.

Friedrich Gilly's works

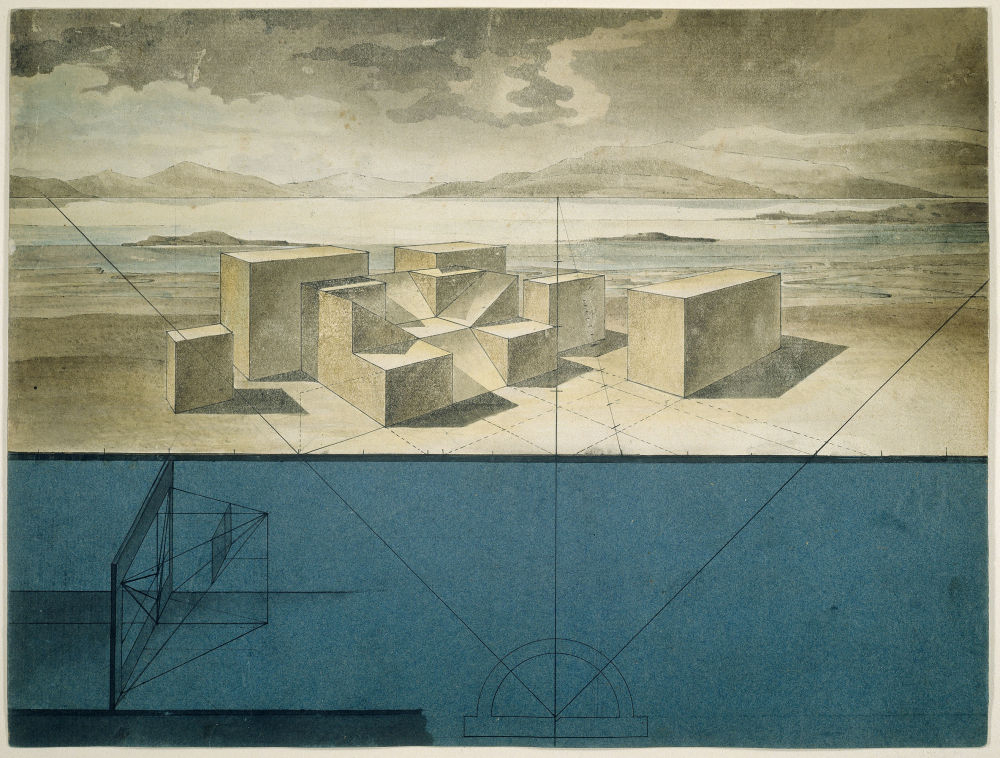
Perspektivisches Studienblatt 1798

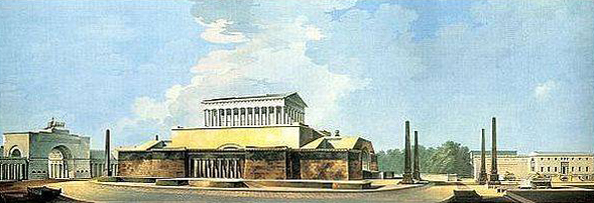
Gilly's plan for a monument to Frederick II of Prussia, Berlin, 1797

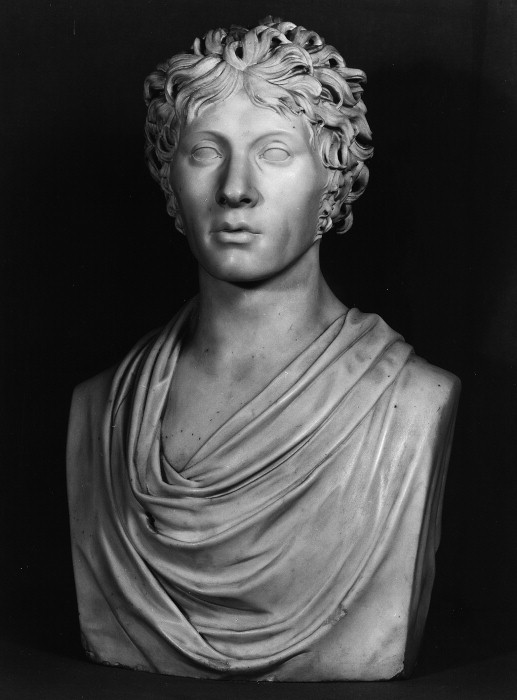
Friedrich Gilly. Bust by Gottfried Schadow

== Bust by Schadow ==
- Bust of Friedrich Gilly (by Johann Gottfried Schadow, 1801)
