= Paretz =

Village in Brandenburg, Germany

Coordinates: 52°28′N 12°53′E

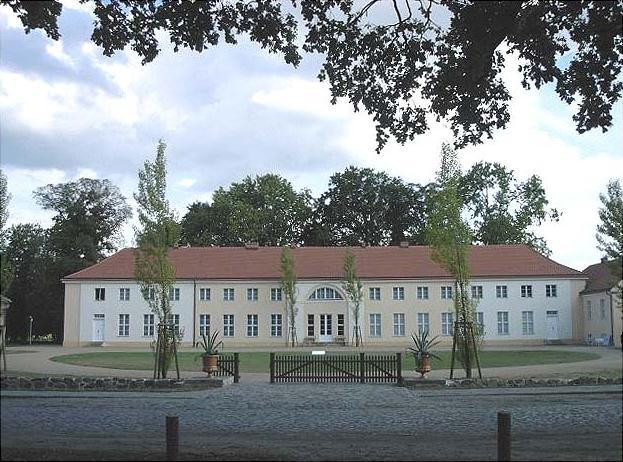
Paretz Palace

Paretz is a village in the German state of Brandenburg in the district of Havelland, west of Berlin. Recently, a district reform made Paretz into a borough of the city of Ketzin. It has a population of approximately 400. In the late 18th and early 19th centuries, the village was the summer residence of King Frederick William III of Prussia and of his wife Queen Louise.

== Paretz Palace ==
The manorial estate of Paretz was originally property of the von Bredow family from whom, in 1677, the Brandenburg diplomat Christoph Caspar von Blumenthal bought it. It was from here that his daughter Wilhelmina eloped with Ernst Christian von Weiler, a married man, in 1689. The estate was inherited by Count Hans von Blumenthal, former commander of the Gardes du Corps, who in retirement was tutor to the Crown Prince Frederick William (later King Frederick William III of Prussia).

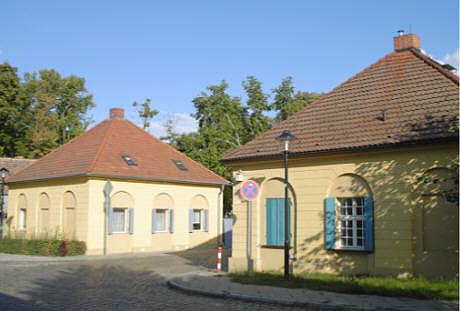
Gate houses

The Crown Prince had a sad childhood, but he was always happy staying with his tutor at Paretz. For this reason, in 1795 he bought the estate of Paretz from his tutor's son, his former playmate Count Heinrich von Blumenthal, for 80,000 Thalers (approximately €120,000 as of 2005). The Berlin architect David Gilly was put in charge of the construction of the building and it was planned to become a country palace. "Just remember always that you are building for a poor farmer", the crown prince is said to have told the architect. Flanking the palace were placed two barn buildings each, on the left and right, (one on each side to house animals) thus forming a semi circular yard. In 1804 the royal couple had the entire village rebuilt to conform to David Gilly's designs but the uniform style is hardly recognizable anymore today.

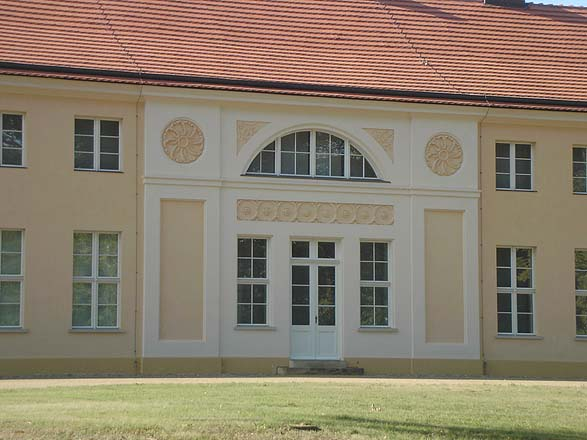
Facade detail

After the death of Queen Louise in 1810 the palace was left unchanged until 1840 when Frederick William IV had the wallpaper and furniture replaced in several rooms. The appeal of the Schloss-Still-im-Land was lost however and the palace remained untouched and empty until early in the 20th century.

The palace continued to be owned by the Hohenzollern until 1945: King Frederick William IV had passed the palace on to King Wilhelm I who became Emperor of Germany in 1871. In 1888 Prince Heinrich took over the palace and his wife Princess Irene of Hesse and by Rhine continued after his death in 1929.

In April 1945 the Red Army took possession of the grounds and the troops didn't leave until halfway through 1946. A year later, refugees moved into the buildings and in 1948 ownership of the palace was transferred to the Zentrale Verwaltung der gegenseitigen Bauernhilfe (ZVdgB) ("Central Administration of Mutual Aid to Farmers"). Modifications to the complex through 1950 completely changed the look of the palace and farm.

Special attractions of the palace are the tapestries that are adorned with exotic plant motives, bird renditions and depictions of landscapes in the Potsdam area. The tapestries survived World War II as they had been removed and kept in the New Palace in Potsdam for safe keeping.

== Gothic House ==
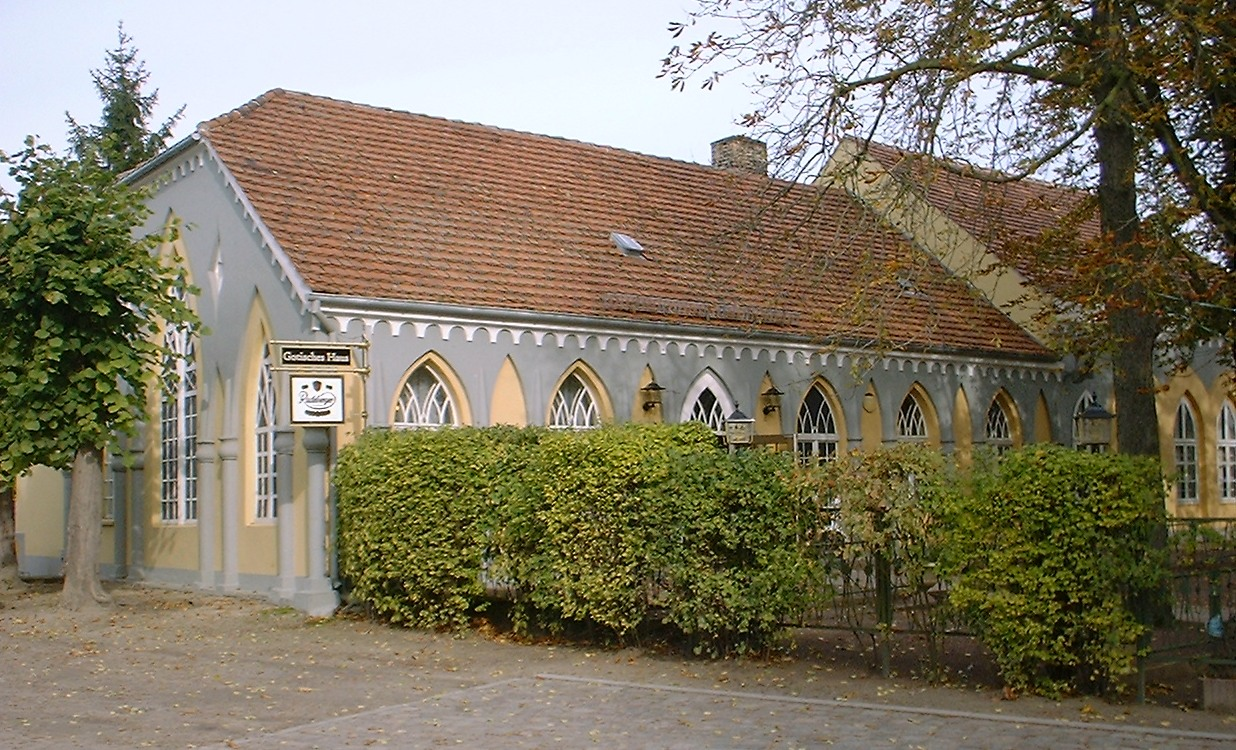
Gothic House

The Gothic House is a former royal forge. It is notable as the only neo-Gothic structure among the other rather simple buildings. Currently, a restaurant is being operated in the building.

== Paretzer Erdlöcher ==
During the 19th century the production of bricks was an important industry for the area as they could be sold to the ever-growing city of Berlin. Therefore, many villages had several tile producing companies. To make the bricks, clay was needed and mined from the clay ground common to the area.

When the business slowed down after World War I, the clay mines filled with ground water and turned into small lakes, the Erdlöcher or "holes in the ground". After World War II, some holes were backfilled with rubble from bombed Berlin (in a peculiar kind of material cycle), today most of them however are home to numerous water fowl and have been placed under environmental protection.

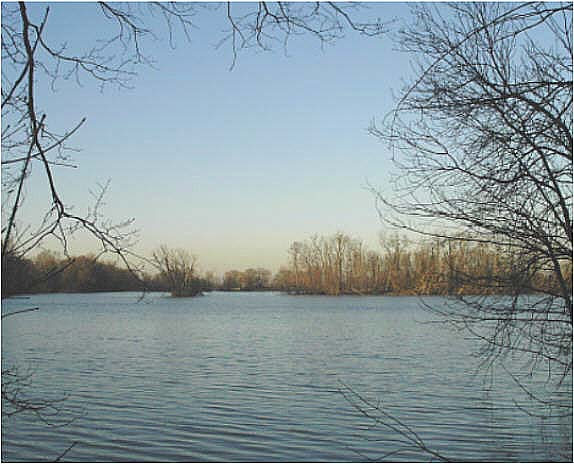

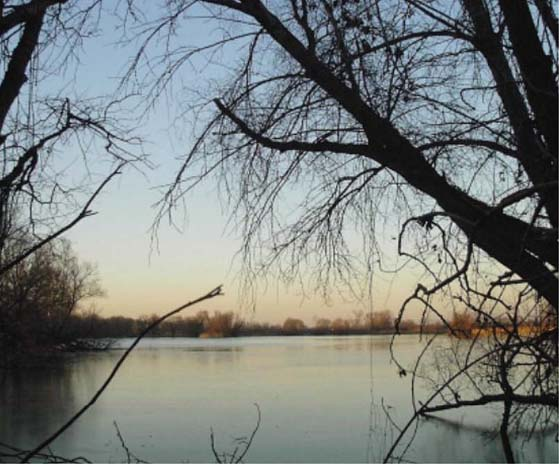

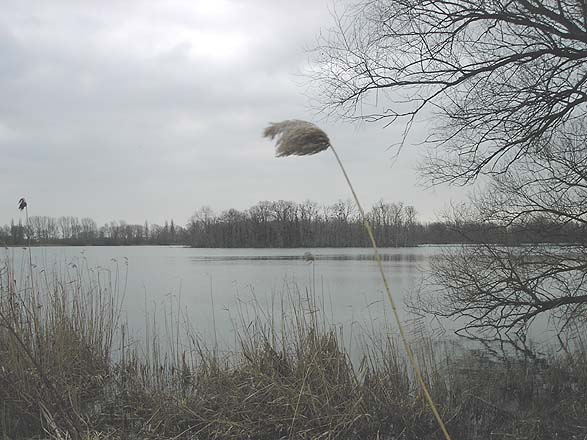

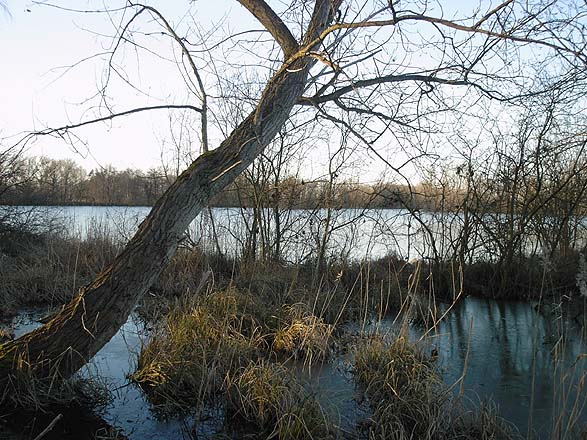

== Theodor Fontane ==
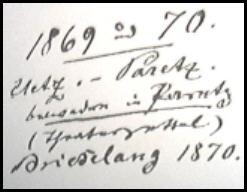

The German poet and author Theodor Fontane liked the village a lot and came to visit Paretz three times: in the spring of 1861, 1869 and in May 1870. He describes the farm Paretz in his Wanderungen durch die Mark Brandenburg in vivid colors:

"Uetz and Paretz are separated by little more than half a mile. On a summer afternoon this is an inspiring walk. The path leads through the meadows and the smell of hay is present from the fields all around us. A thin, fog lit by the sun marks the spot where the wide Havel with its many bays and lakes lies. Paretz itself does not appear to us until the very last."

"Finally the path turns into a levee and instead of the fruit trees that so far have kept us company there are tall poplars and royal buildings everywhere until we cross a light and elegant bridge, called the Infantenbrücke, and reach the village road. The road takes us through the park then grows wider just after going around a bend and we are there."

== Waterways ==
Paretz lies on the River Havel between the cities of Potsdam and Brandenburg, and the junction of that river with two canals is nearby. Both canals were built to provide alternative routes to the river, but for rather different ulterior purposes.

In the 1870s, the Sacrow–Paretz Canal was constructed to link Paretz with the Jungfernsee, near Potsdam, thus providing a shorter navigation route to Berlin and points upstream for vessels navigating the River Havel. In the 1950s, the Havel Canal was constructed to link Paretz with Hennigsdorf, significantly further upstream than Potsdam and avoiding a passage through the reach of the River Havel that was under the political control of West Berlin. Both canals are still in use, providing shorter routes for shipping from the west to Berlin and to the Oder–Havel Canal and Poland.
