= Weißer See (Kargow) =

Lake in Kargow, Mecklenburg-Vorpommern, Germany

- Location within Mecklenburg-Vorpommern
- Location: Kargow, Mecklenburgische Seenplatte, Mecklenburg-Vorpommern
- Coordinates: 53°26′58″N 12°51′12″E
- Basin countries: Germany
- Surface area: 0.062 km^{2} (0.024 sq mi)
- Surface elevation: 63.6 m (209 ft)

Weißer See is a lake in Kargow, Mecklenburgische Seenplatte, Mecklenburg-Vorpommern, Germany. At an elevation of 63.6 m, its surface area is 0.062 km^{2}.
