= Friedrich Weissensee =

German composer and Protestant minister

Friedrich Weißensee (c. 1560 – 1622) was a German composer and Protestant minister. Alongside his contemporaries Christoph Demantius, Michael Praetorius and Melchior Vulpius, he was one of the leading Protestant composers of his time.

== Life ==
He was born c. 1560 in Schwerstedt, Thüringen. In 1590 he was made rector of a Latin school in Gebesee near Erfurt. In 1596 he succeeded Leonhart Schröter as cantor at the Altstädtische Schule in Magdeburg on Schröter's retirement – one of Weißensee's pupils was Daniel Friderici. In 1602 he became a minister in Altenweddingen bei Magdeburg, where he died in 1622.

== Selected works ==
- „Evangelische Sprüche auß den Evangelien der vornemsten und feyerlichen Fest-Tagen . . . gezogen . . . mit 5. Stimmen einfeltig . . . figuriret . . . Der erste Theil“ (Erfurt, 1595) and „Hochzeit-Lied aus den Sprüchwörtern Salomonis“ (Magdeburg, 1599) – important early contributions to the field of German-language motets
- „Hochzeitlicher Ehren Dantz, mit Stimmen componiert auff das adelige Beylager des . . . Wolfgang Spitznasen zu Magdeburgh Domherrn“ (Magdeburg, 1600)
- „Opus Melicum, methodicum et planè novum . . .“ (Magdeburg, 1602) Sammlung von 72 Motetten durch das Kirchenjahr, mit einem 10st. „Nunc facta est salus“ von Luca Marenzio – containing 72 German and Latin motets in four to twelve parts, this was his most important work and shows him to rank alongside Adrian Willaert and Andrea Gabrieli as one of the best German proponents of the Venetian polychoral style
- „Geistlich Braut und Hochzeit Gesang, mit 6 Stim. comp, zu Ehren . . . Georg Schnitzen“ (Magdeburg, 1611)
- „Memoria gemina: I. metrica, quam carmine Phalecio: II. melica...“ (Magdeburg, 1616)

He also wrote two eight-part motets in 1603 and 1612 which were included in Erhard Bodenschatz's collection entitled „Florilegium Portense“.

== Bibliography ==
- Eduard Jacobs: Weißensee, Friedrich. In: Allgemeine Deutsche Biographie (ADB). Vol. 55, Duncker & Humblot, Leipzig 1910, S. 26 f.
