= Lake Fehér =

Lake Fehér may refer to:

- Lake Fehér in Hungary, near Szeged
- Lake Fehér in Hungary, near Kardoskút
