= Havel Canal =

Canal in Brandenburg, Germany

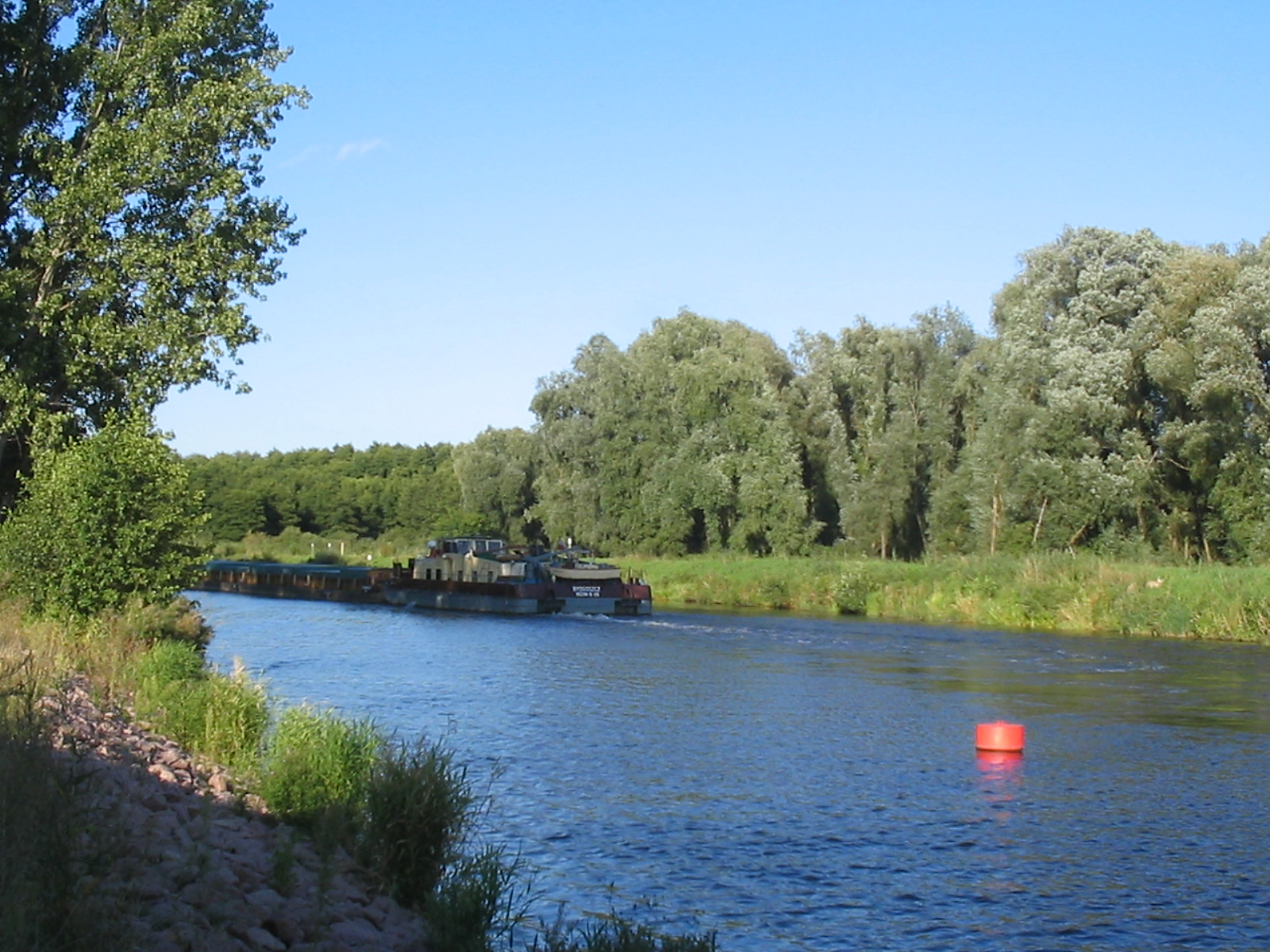
The Havel Canal

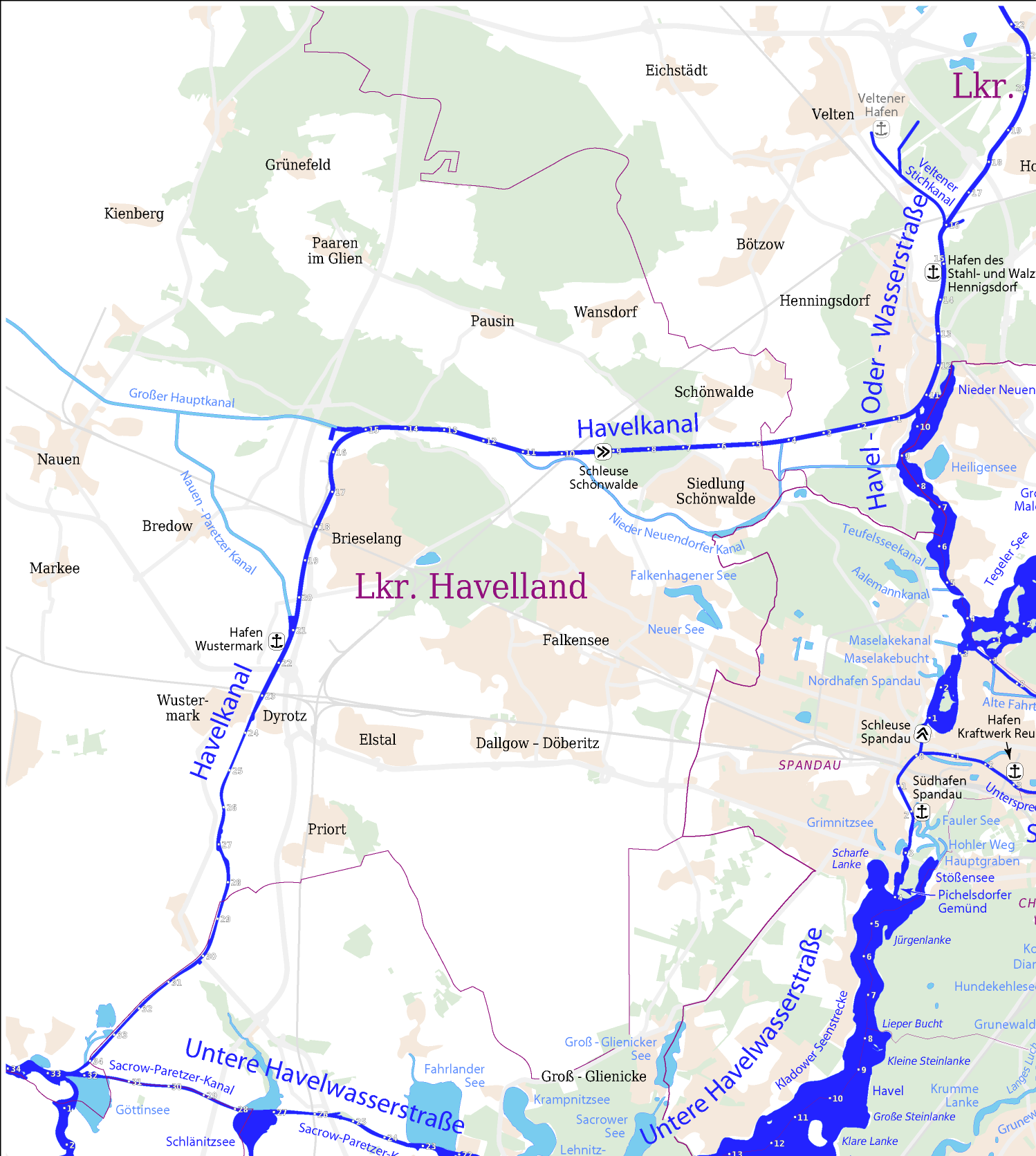
The Havel Canal in the context of the waterways west of Berlin

The Havel Canal, or Havelkanal in German, is a canal in the German state of Brandenburg. It provides an alternate route to the River Havel, between Hennigsdorf and Paretz, thus avoiding a passage through the waterways of Berlin between Spandau and Potsdam.

Construction of the canal was authorised by the government of East Germany in April 1951. After an extraordinarily short construction period of 13 months, the canal was opened in June 1952, thus allowing East German vessels to avoid transiting parts of the River Havel within the political control of West Berlin. Besides its political and military advantages, the canal also allowed large vessels to avoid the (then) small lock at Spandau and reduced the distance travelled by 9 kilometres (5.6 mi).

The canal has a length of 34.9 kilometres (21.7 mi) and has a single lock at Schönwalde, with a vertical drop of roughly 2 metres (6 ft 7 in).
