= Lake Beloye (Beshankovichy Raion) =

Lake in Beshankovichy District, Vitebsk Region, Belarus

Beloye Lake Бе́лое о́зеро Белае возера
- Location within Belarus
- Location: Beshankovichy District, Vitebsk Region, Belarus
- Coordinates: 55°01′05″N 29°44′21″E
- Catchment area: 13 km^{2} (5.0 sq mi)
- Max. length: 6.17 km (3.83 miles)
- Surface area: 1.49 km^{2} (0.58 sq mi)
- Max. depth: 12.4 m (41 ft)

Beloye Lake (Russian: Бе́лое о́зеро, Belarusian: Белае возера) is a lake in Beshankovichy District, Vitebsk Region, Belarus in the basin of Charnagosnitsa River, 16 kilometres (9.9 mi) east of Beshankovichy.

The lake basin is very elongated in the north-west relative to south-east directions, with length of 6.17 kilometres (3.83 mi) and maximum width of 0.53 kilometres (0.33 mi) making up a surface area of 1.49 square kilometres (0.58 sq mi). The maximum depth is 12.4 metres (41 ft). The catchment area of the lake is about 13 square kilometres (5.0 sq mi). Near the lake are the villages of Gorodets, Zabelye and Maly Pavlovich.

The slopes of the basin on the east side of the lake are up to 3 meters high, while in the west they are steep and reach 20 meters. The beach merges with the slopes of the basin, and at the northern and southern end of the lake are swampy. The bottom sand is at a depth of 4 metres (13 ft). Vegetation extends to a depth of 4 metres (13 ft) into the lake streams and stream flows in Ostrovenskoe lake.
