= Jungfernsee =

Lake in Brandenburg, Germany

Jungerfernsee
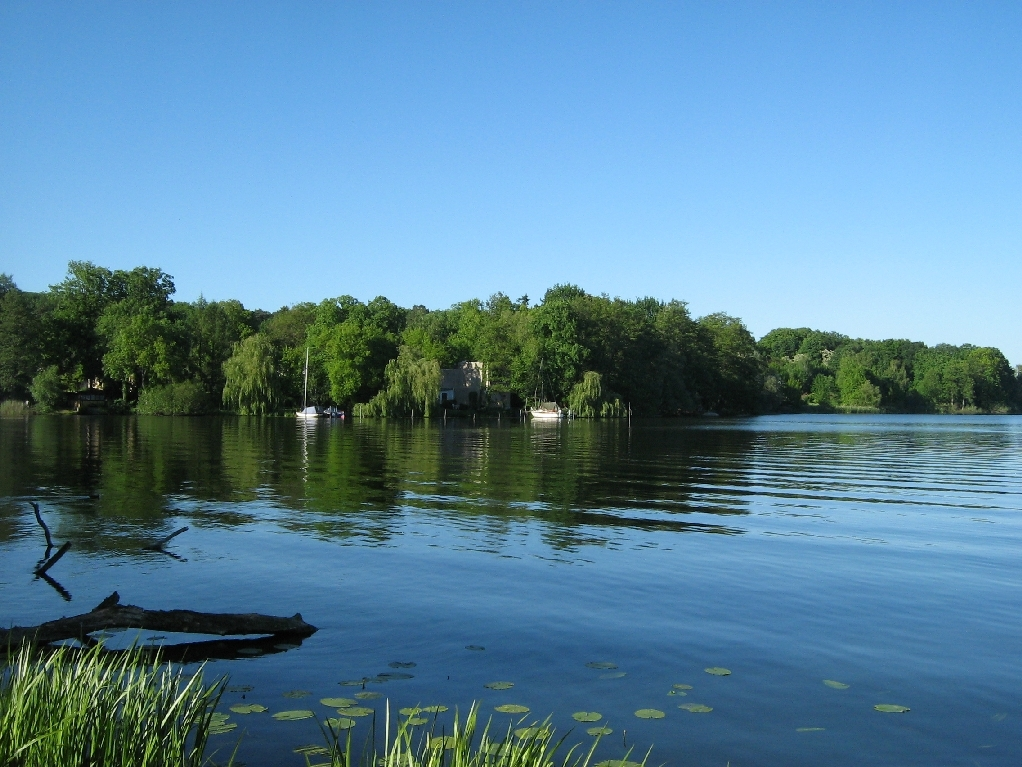
- Jungfernsee near Nedlitz

- Location within Brandenburg
- Location: near Potsdam, Germany
- Coordinates: 52°25′N 13°05′E
- Primary inflows: River Havel
- Primary outflows: River Havel, Sacrow–Paretz Canal
- Basin countries: Germany
- Surface area: 1.242 km^{2} (0.480 mi^{2})
- Max. depth: 4 m (13 ft)
- Surface elevation: 29.4 m (96 ft)

The Jungfernsee (translated "Virgin Lake") is north of Potsdam, Germany. It was a glacial kettle and is now part of the River Havel, which runs along its southeastern shore, which is also the only part of its shores that is in Berlin. The rest of the lake lies in the Potsdam district.

== Overview ==
It spans 3.52 kilometres (2.19 mi) in a northwest–southeast direction, widens to 1.45 kilometres (0.90 mi) in the southeast from just 180 metres (590 ft) at its narrowest point. The lake is part of a federal waterway and one point where the Sacrow–Paretz Canal connects to the Havel. Until 1990, there was a border crossing for ships on the lake, at the end of the canal.

On the lake's southern end at the outflow of the Havel is the Glienicke Bridge, also known as the Bridge of Spies. Besides that, other sights around the Jungfernsee include Cecilienhof to the southwest, the Heilandskirche in Sacrow to the north and the park and palace of Glienicke, southeast again. The former royal Dairy in the New Garden also lies on the shore of the lake and is today a restaurant and brewery.

In 1999, the south shore was added to the Palaces and Parks of Potsdam and Berlin World Heritage Site.

== See also ==
- Fahrlander See
