= Weißer See (Potsdam) =

Lake in Potsdam, Brandenburg, Germany

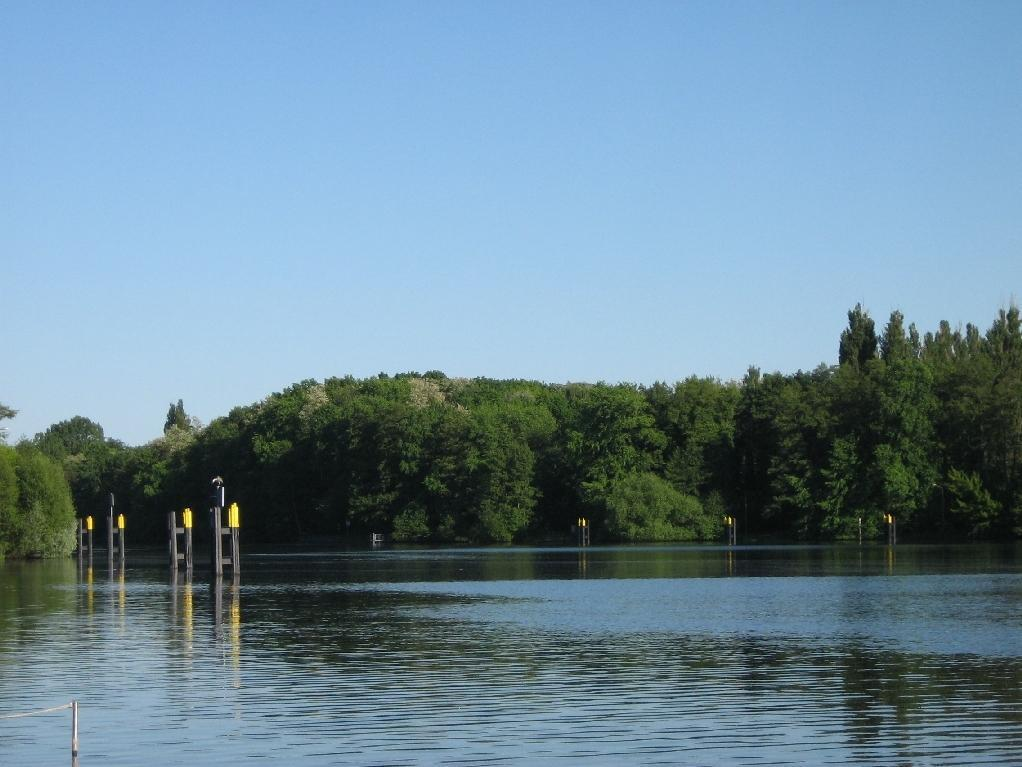

- Location within Brandenburg
- Location: Brandenburg
- Coordinates: 52°26′0″N 13°2′0″E
- Primary inflows: Sacrow–Paretz Canal
- Primary outflows: Sacrow–Paretz Canal
- Basin countries: Germany
- Max. length: 1.2 km (0.75 mi)
- Max. width: 0.34 km (0.21 mi)
- Surface area: 0.26 km^{2} (0.10 mi^{2})
- Max. depth: 2 m (6.6 ft)
- Surface elevation: 29.4 m (96 ft)
- Settlements: Potsdam

Weißer See is a lake in Brandenburg, Germany. At an elevation of 29.4 metres (96 ft), its surface covers 0.26 square kilometres (0.10 mi^{2}). The Sacrow–Paretz Canal flows through the lake.
