= Lake Beloye (Chuvashia) =

Lake Beloye Çуткӳл Бе́лое о́зеро
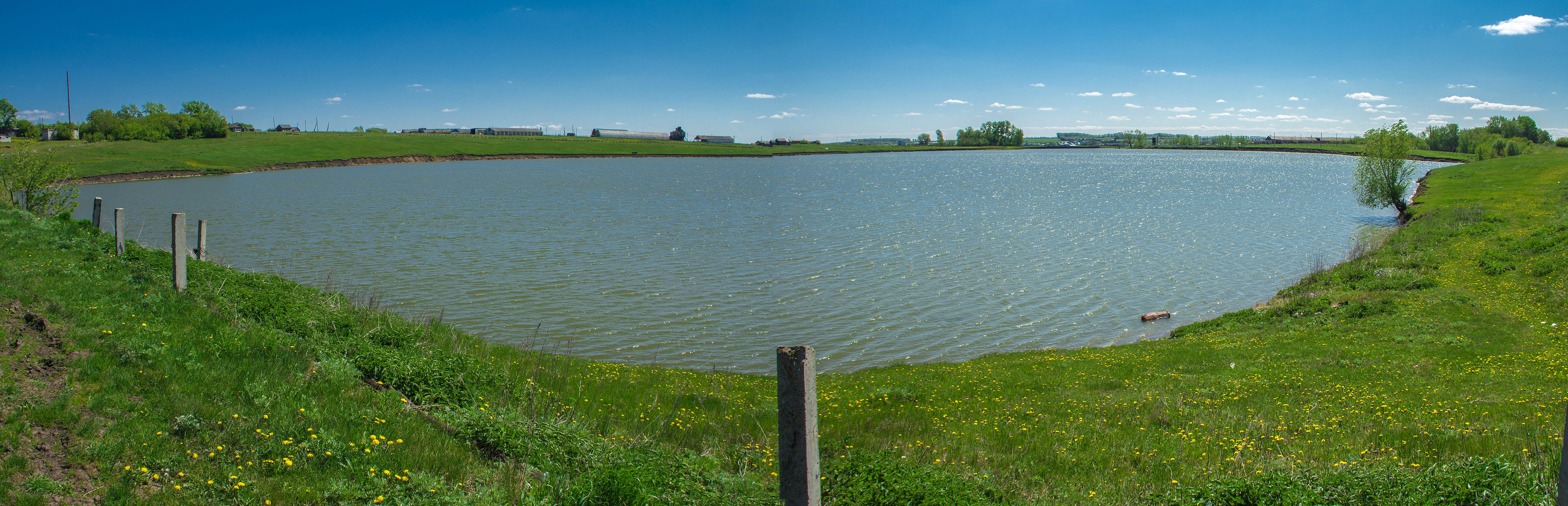

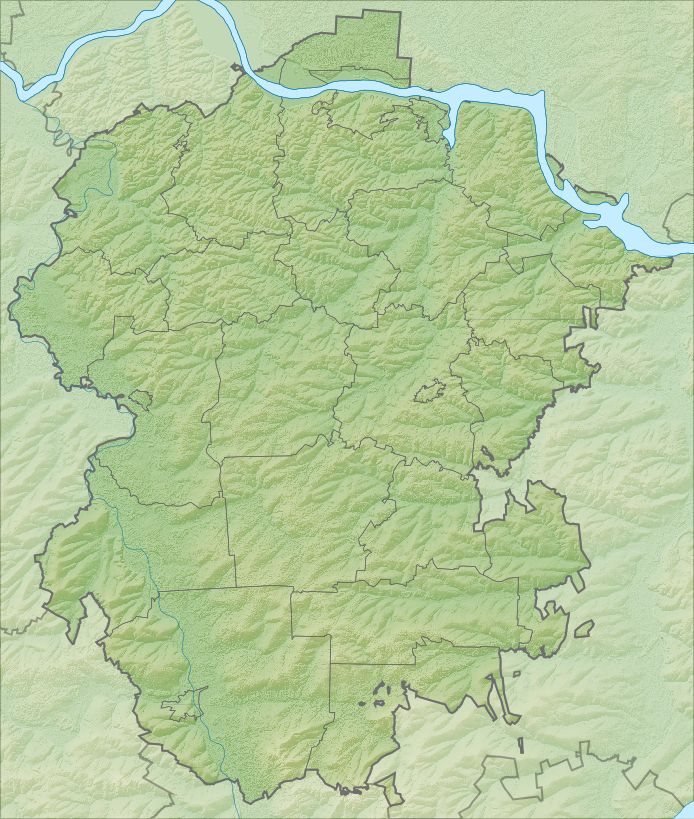
- Location within Chuvash Republic
- Location: Yalchiksky District, Chuvashia, Russia
- Coordinates: 55°10′18.4″N 47°44′48.2″E
- Type: Karst lake
- Max. length: 570 m (1,870 ft)
- Max. width: 380 m (1,250 ft)
- Surface area: 17.5 ha (43 acres)
- Average depth: 3 m (9.8 ft)
- Max. depth: 4 m (13 ft)

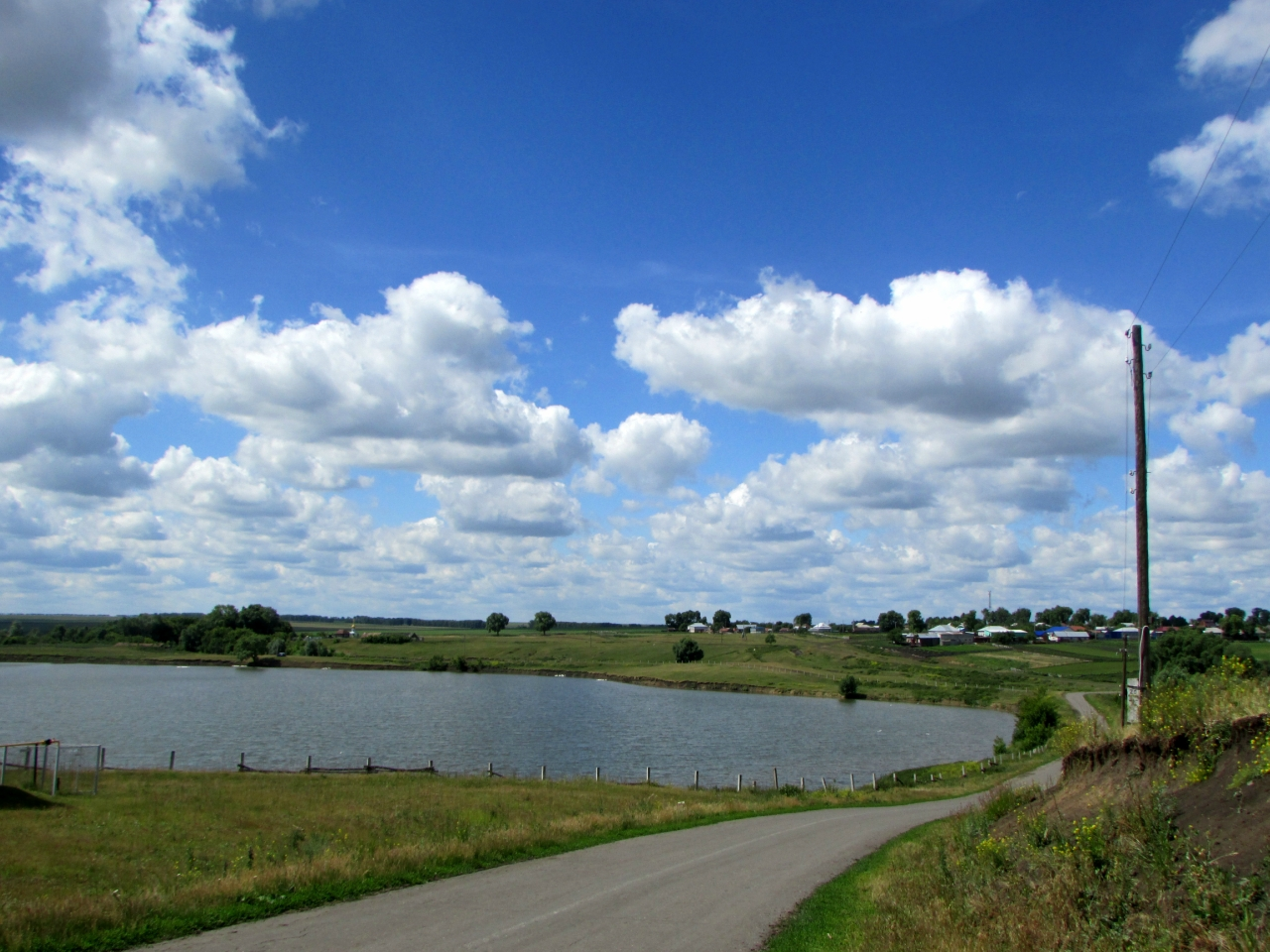

Lake Beloye (Chuvash: Çуткӳл,Śutkül; Russian: Бе́лое о́зеро, IPA: [ˈbʲɛləjə ˈozʲɪrə] — literally White lake) is a lake in Yalchiksky District of Chuvashia, Russia. It is a karst lake. The length is 570 metres (1,870 ft) and width is 380 metres (1,250 ft), covering an approximate area of 17.5 hectares (43 acres). The average depth is 3 metres (9.8 ft) and maximum depth 4 metres (13 ft).
