= Lessing =

Lessing is a German surname of Slavic origin. The original Sorbian form, Lěsnik, means either "forest dweller" or "woodman", lěs meaning "wood forest".

People with the surname Lessing include a German family of writers, artists, musicians and politicians who can be traced back to a Michil Lessigk, mentioned in 1518 as being a linen weaver in Jahnsdorf, near Chemnitz. The family includes:

- Johann Gottfried Lessing (1693–1770) pastor primarus in Kamenz, well respected, published theologian, translator and father of Gotthold Ephraim Lessing (1729–1781) and Karl Gotthelf Lessing (1740–1812). Johann Gottfried's father Theophilus Lessing (1647–1735) was mayor of Kamenz and Robert Schumann's (the composer and pianist, 1810–1856) great-great-great-great-uncle, Johanne Sophie Susanna Lessing (1745–1818, daughter of Carl Heinrich Lessing 1713, a trumpeter) his grandmother.
- Gotthold Ephraim Lessing (1729–1781), one of the most prominent philosophers of the Enlightenment era, recognised as the world's first dramaturg, Germany's first dramatist and comedy playwright, champion for religious tolerance, friend of Moses Mendelssohn, critic for the Vossische Zeitung, translator and Shakespearean scholar. Today his own works appear as prototypes of the later developed bourgeois German drama. Scholars generally see Miss Sara Sampson and Emilia Galotti as the first bourgeois tragedies, Minna von Barnhelm as the model for many classic German comedies, Nathan the Wise as the first German drama of ideas ("Ideendrama") and his theoretical writings Laokoon and Hamburg Dramaturgy set the standards for the discussion of aesthetic and literary theoretical principles.
- Karl Gotthelf Lessing (1740–1812), Gotthold Ephraim Lessing's (1729–1781) younger brother and his first biographer, comedy playwright, translator, mint director, and owner (through marriage to Marie Friederike Voß, the daughter of Christian Friedrich Voß) of the Vossische Zeitung.
- Karl Friedrich Lessing (1808–1880), German painter; son of Carl Friedrich Lessing (1778–1848) and great-nephew of Gotthold Ephraim Lessing (1729–1781), married to Ida Heuser, niece of painter Henriette Jügel and whose niece Malwine Schroedter (1847–1901) married painter and then director of the Academy of Arts, Berlin, Anton von Werner.
- Christian Friedrich Lessing (1809–1862, died and buried in Krasnoyarsk, Siberia), physician, botanist and writer; son of Carl Friedrich Lessing (1778–1848) and great-nephew of Gotthold Ephraim Lessing (1729–1781)
- Carl Robert Lessing (1827–1895), publicist, owner of the Vossische Zeitung and Schloss Meseberg; son of Carl Friedrich Lessing (1778–1848) and great-nephew of Gotthold Ephraim Lessing (1729–1781).
- Gotthold Ephraim Lessing the Younger (1861–1919), son of Carl Robert Lessing (1827–1895), landowner and liberal politician.
- Otto Lessing (sculptor) (1846–1912), German sculptor, photographer and writer, gifted pianist, son of Karl Friedrich Lessing (1808–1880), married to Sigrid Gude, daughter of Norwegian painter Hans Gude.
- Konrad Lessing (1852–1916) landscape painter; son of Karl Friedrich Lessing (1808–1880).
- Heinrich Lessing (1856–1930), painter; son of Karl Friedrich Lessing (1808–1880).
- Kolja Lessing (born 1961), German pianist, violinist, composer and music professor at the Stuttgart Musik Hochschule; great-great-great-great-great-nephew of Gotthold Ephraim Lessing (1729–1781).

Lessing is also the surname of:

- Ada Lessing (1883-1953), German journalist and politician
- Doris Lessing (1919–2013), British novelist and the 2007 Nobel Prize laureate in literature; once married to Gottfried Lessing
- Gottfried Lessing (1914–1979), German diplomat
- Erich Lessing (1923–2018), Austrian Magnum photographer
- Feodor Yulievich Levinson-Lessing (1861–1939), Russian geologist
- Lawrence Lessing, American journalist
- Madge Lessing (1862–1935), English actress
- Roland Lessing (born 1978), Estonian biathlete
- Simon Lessing (born 1971), British athlete
- Theodor Lessing (1872–1933), German-Jewish philosopher

== Similar names ==
- Lessig
