= Lesser =

Lesser, from Eliezer (Hebrew: אֱלִיעֶזֶר, Modern: Eli'ezer, Tiberian: ʼĔlîʻézer, "Help/Court of my God"), is a surname. Notable people with the surname include:

- Adolf Lesser (1851–1926), German physician
- Aleksander Lesser (1814–1884), Polish painter and art critic
- Anton Lesser (born 1952), British actor
- Axel Lesser (born 1946), East German cross country skier
- Edmund Lesser (1852–1918), German dermatologist
- Erik Lesser (born 1988), German biathlete
- Friedrich Christian Lesser (1692–1754), German theologian
- Gabriele Lesser (born 1960), German historian and journalist
- George Lesser, American musician
- Gerald S. Lesser (1926–2010), American psychologist
- Henry Lesser (born 1963), German footballer
- J Lesser (born 1970), American musician
- Len Lesser (1922–2011), American actor
- Louis Lesser (1916–2013), American real estate developer
- Matt Lesser, Connecticut politician
- Mike Lesser (1943–2015), British mathematical philosopher and political activist
- Milton Lesser or Stephen Marlowe (1928–2008), American author
- Norman Lesser (1902–1985), Anglican bishop and Archbishop of New Zealand
- Otto Lesser (1830–1887), German astronomer
- Rika Lesser (born 1953), American poet
- Robert Lesser (born 1942), American actor
- Ron Lesser (born 1941), American artist
- Rosa Lesser, Austrian luger
- Ryan Lesser, Rhode Island video game designer
- Sam Lesser or Sam Russell (1915–2010), British journalist and Spanish Civil War veteran
- Sol Lesser (1890–1980), American film producer
- Stephen A. Lesser (born 1944), American architect
- Virginia Lesser, American statistician
- Wendy Lesser (born 1952), American author, editor and critic
- Werner Lesser (1932–2005), East German ski jumper

Lesser is also a given name. Notable people with the given name include:

- Lesser Samuels (1894–1980), Hollywood screenwriter
- Lesser Ury (1861–1931), German Impressionist painter and printmaker

== See also ==
- Lessing
- Lessor (disambiguation)
