= Posin =

Posin is a surname. Notable people with the surname include:

- Arie Posin, Israeli-born American film director and screenwriter
- Daniel Q. Posin (1909–2003), American physicist
- Jerry Posin (born 1951), American drummer
- Kathryn Posin (born 1943), American choreographer
