= Loesser (surname) =

Loesser is a surname. Notable people with the surname include:

- Arthur Loesser (1894–1969), American classical pianist and writer
- Frank Loesser (1910–1969), American songwriter
- Jo Sullivan Loesser (1927–2019), American actress and singer

== See also ==
- Lesser
