= James T. Grady-James H. Stack Award for Interpreting Chemistry =

Annual award by the American Chemical Society

The James T. Grady-James H. Stack Award for Interpreting Chemistry for the Public is an award presented annually by the American Chemical Society to an individual who has increased public understanding of chemistry, chemical engineering, and related chemical fields. Typically the winner must have communicated to the public through "the press, radio, television, films, the lecture platform, books, or pamphlets for the lay public."

The award was established in 1955 as the James T. Grady Medal. Grady, who served as Director of Public Information at Columbia University and managing editor of ACS News Service from 1923 to 1948, advocated that scientists should share their findings with the public through popular media. In 1984, the name of James H. Stack, managing editor of ACS News Service from 1948 to 1960, was posthumously added to the award's name.

The award is presented annually at the American Chemical Society's Spring Meeting. Recipients of the award receive a commemorative certificate, medallion, and prize of $5,000.

== Recipients ==
- 1957 David H. Killeffer
- 1958 William L. Laurence
- 1959 Alton L. Blakeslee
- 1960 Watson Davis
- 1961 David Dietz
- 1962 John F. Baxter
- 1963 Lawrence Lessing
- 1964 Nate Haseltine
- 1965 Isaac Asimov
- 1966 Frank E. Carey
- 1967 Irving S. Bengelsdorf
- 1968 Raymond A. Bruner
- 1969 Walter S. Sullivan
- 1970 Robert C. Cowen
- 1971 Victor Cohn
- 1972 Daniel Q. Posin
- 1973 O. A. Battista
- 1974 Ronald Kotulak
- 1975 Jon Franklin
- 1976 Gene Bylinsky
- 1977 Patrick Young
- 1978 Michael Woods
- 1979 Peter Gwynne
- 1980 Edward Edelson
- 1981 Robert W. Cooke
- 1982 Albert Rosenfeld
- 1983 Matt Clark
- 1984 Cristine Russell
- 1985 Joe Alper
- 1986 Ben Patrusky
- 1987 Al Rossiter Jr.
- 1988 Arthur Fisher
- 1989 Robert Kanigel
- 1990 Jerry E. Bishop
- 1991 Betty Debnam
- 1992 Malcolm Browne
- 1993 Tom Siegfried
- 1994 Don Herbert
- 1995 Ivan Amato
- 1996 Elizabeth Pennisi
- 1997 Richard Lipkin
- 1998 Joe Palca
- 1999 Joseph A. Schwarcz
- 2000 Jeff Wheelwright
- 2001 David Perlman
- 2002 Curt Suplee
- 2003 Boyce Rensberger
- 2004 William S. Hammack
- 2005 Robert L. Wolke
- 2006 Philip Ball
- 2007 Stuart F. Brown
- 2008 Harold McGee
- 2009 Roald Hoffmann
- 2010 Ron Seely
- 2011 Theodore Gray
- 2012 Paul Raeburn
- 2013 Shirley O. Corriher
- 2014 Alan Alda
- 2015 Deborah Blum
- 2016 Peter Atkins
- 2017 Thomas Hager
- 2018 Bassam Shakhashiri
- 2019 Sir Martyn Poliakoff
- 2020 Raychelle Burks
- 2021 Sam Kean
- 2022 Jennifer L. Maclachlan
- 2023 Mitch Jacoby
- 2024 Christopher M. Reddy
- 2025 Andy Brunning
- 2026 Stephen M. Cohen

== See also ==
- List of chemistry awards
