= Katharine Giles =

Climate scientist

- Katharine Giles
- Born: Katharine Anne Giles; March 22, 1978
- Died: April 8, 2013 (aged 35)
- Education: The Hertfordshire and Essex High School; University College London (MSci, PhD)
- Scientific career
- Workplaces: University College London
- Thesis: Radar and laser altimeter measurements over Arctic sea ice (2005)
- Doctoral advisor: Seymour Laxon

Katharine Anne Giles (22 March 1978 - 8 April 2013) was a British climate scientist. Her research considered sea ice cover, ocean circulation and wind patterns. She was a passionate science communicator, and since 2015, the Association of British Science Writers has held a science communication award in her honour.

== Early life and education ==
Giles was educated at The Hertfordshire and Essex High School, completing GCE A Levels in design technology, maths and physics. She was awarded first class honours for her degree in earth and space science at University College London. She volunteered at the Science Museum during her undergraduate studies. She earned her PhD for research supervised by Seymour Laxon in 2005. She performed the first ground-based experiments to show how to monitor sea ice thickness using satellite altimetery. An altimeter monitors electromagnetic waves reflected from the surface of ice.

== Career and research ==
After completing her PhD, Giles remained at University College London as a postdoctoral researcher, studying the thickness of Arctic Ice. Giles demonstrated that sea ice floes could be used to demonstrate how winds affected the newly exposed Arctic Ocean. She was awarded a Natural Environment Research Council (NERC) fellowship to study wind patterns in the Arctic at the Centre for Polar Observation and Modelling. Giles showed that fresh water in the Arctic Ocean was due to an intensifying of the winds in Beaufort Gyre. To prove this, Giles used the European Remote-Sensing Satellite and Envisat. She calculated that the sea surface in the Western Arctic rose by 15 cm between 2002 and 2012, and sea water had increased by 8000 cubic kilometres. By using the European Space Agency CryoSat-2, Giles identified that thick sea ice had disappeared from Greenland, the Canadian Archipelago and Svalbard. She found that between 2003 and 2012 the arctic sea ice volume in the winter had decreased by 9%. The findings confirmed the predictions of the Pan-Arctic Ice-Ocean Modelling & Assimilation System (PIOMAS).

Giles was killed whilst cycling in 2013. She had just been appointed as a lecturer at University College London. Peter Wadhams believed that the death could have been an assassination, as Giles' colleagues Seymour Laxon and Tim Boyd all died within the first few months of 2013. In 2016 it was proposed to name the new Natural Environment Research Council (NERC) research vessel (RV) /Royal Research Ship (RRS) Katharine Giles. (The vessel was finally named the RRS Sir David Attenborough).

On 3 December 2020, the Government of the British Antarctic Territory named Giles Bay, between Weaver Point and Tula Point at the northern end of Renaud Island, Biscoe Islands for Katharine Giles.

=== The Dr Katharine Giles Fund ===
The Association of British Science Writers (ABSW) awards the Dr Katharine Giles science communication prize each year for the best popular article written by a scientist or engineer. As well as a cash award, the Fund offers free media training to winners. The prize is funded by the Dr Katharine Giles Fund. It has been awarded to:

- 2016 Alex Bellos from the Guardian newspaper
- 2017 Microbe Post, written by Benjamin Thompson and Anand Jagatia from the Microbiology Society
- 2018 Andy Brunning, Compound Interest
- 2019 The Student Engager Team (Arendse Lund, Cerys Bradley, Kyle Lee-Crossett, Josie Mills, Hannah Wills, Alexandra Bridarolli, Mark Kearney, Anna Pokorska, Hannah Page, Sarah Gibbs, Cerys Jones, Caz Thompson, and Jen Datiles) from University College London
- 2020 Anna Henschel at the Glasgow Insight Into Science & Technology for the article Can really *everyone* be a data scientist?
- 2021 Professor Sheena Cruickshank, University of Manchester, for her article "Inflammation: the key factor that explains vulnerability to severe COVID"
- 2022 Bonnie Waring, Imperial College London, "There aren’t enough trees in the world to offset society’s carbon emissions – and there never will be", The Conversation

=== Family history in climate research ===
Giles's great, great-grandfather was Edward Walter Maunder whose solar research, and in particular the period of rare sunspot activity, the Maunder Minimum, has been linked to historical variations in climate.
