= List of international premieral trips made by Wen Jiabao =

This is a list of international trips made by Wen Jiabao, the premier of China since from March 2003 to March 2013.

== Summary ==
The number of visits per country where he has travelled are:

- One visit to: Angola, Argentina, Australia, Bangladesh, Belarus, Brazil, Brunei, Canada, Chile, Denmark, Ethiopia, Fiji, Finland, France, Ghana, Greece, Hungary, Iceland, Ireland, Kazakhstan, Mexico, Mongolia, Morocco, Myanmar, Nepal, the Netherlands, New Zealand, North Korea, Philippines, Poland, Qatar, the Republic of Congo, Saudi Arabia, Singapore, Slovakia, South Africa, Sri Lanka, Sweden, Switzerland, Tajikistan, Tanzania, Turkey, Turkmenistan, Uganda, the United Arab Emirates, Uruguay, and Uzbekistan
- Two visits to: Cambodia, Czech Republic, Egypt, India, Italy, Kyrgyzstan, Malaysia, Pakistan, Portugal, Spain, South Korea, Tajikistan, and Vietnam
- Three visits to: Laos and the United States
- Four visits to: Belgium, Indonesia, Japan, Thailand, and the United Kingdom
- Six visits to: Germany
- Seven visits to: Russia

World map highlighting countries visited by Wen Jiabao during his premiership. One visit Two visits Three visits Four visits Five visits Six or more visits China

== 2003 ==
| Dates | Country | Location | Details |
|---|---|---|---|
| 29 April | Thailand | Bangkok | Wen attended the China-ASEAN special meeting on SARS. Met with Thai prime minister Thaksin Shinawatra, Cambodian prime minister Hun Sen and Singaporean prime minister Goh Chok Tong. He also met with Hong Kong Chief Executive Tung Chee-hwa. |
| 6–8 October | Indonesia | Bali | |
| 7–10 December | United States | New York City; Washington, D.C. Boston | |
| 10–12 December | Canada | Ottawa | Official visit. Wen held talks with Canadian prime minister Jean Chrétien, and met with Canadian governor general Adrienne Clarkson, Prime Minister-designate and Liberal Party leader Paul Martin, Senate president Dan Hays, and House of Representatives Speaker Peter Milliken. |
| 12–13 December | Mexico | Mexico City | Official visit. Wen held talks with Mexican president Vicente Fox, and met with Mexican Senate President Enrique Jackson and Chamber of Deputies First Vice President Arroyo. |
| 14 December | Spain | Gran Canaria | Technical stop. Wen spoke with Spanish prime minister José María Aznar on the phone, and met with Canary Islands president Adán Martín Menis and Spanish Central Government Representative to the Canary Islands Lopez. He also visited the Canary Islands Port of La Luz. |
| 14–16 December | Ethiopia | Addis Ababa | |

== 2004 ==
| Dates | Country | Location | Details |
|---|---|---|---|
| 2–4 May | Germany | Munich; Berlin; Potsdam | |
| 4–6 May | Belgium | Brussels | |
| 6–9 May | Italy | Rome | |
| 9–11 May | United Kingdom | London | |
| 11–12 May | Ireland | Dublin | Official visit. Wen held talks with Taoiseach Bertie Ahern. |
| 21–23 September | Kyrgyzstan | Bishkek | |
| 23–25 September | Russia | Moscow | |
| 6–9 October | Vietnam | Hanoi | |
| 28–30 November | Laos | Vientiane | |
| 7–9 December | Netherlands | The Hague; Amsterdam | |

== 2005 ==
| Dates | Country | Location | Details |
|---|---|---|---|
| 5–6 January | Indonesia | Jakarta | |
| 5–7 April | Pakistan | Islamabad; Lahore | |
| 7–8 April | Bangladesh | Dhaka | Official visit. Wen held talks with Bangladeshi Prime Minister Khaleda Zia and meet with Bangladeshi President Iajuddin Ahmed. |
| 8–9 April | Sri Lanka | Colombo | Official visit. Wen held talks with Sri Lankan President Chandrika Kumaratunga, met with Sri Lankan Prime Minister Mahinda Rajapaksa and Leader of the Opposition Ranil Wickremesinghe, inspected the tsunami-affected areas in Sri Lanka, and attended the unveiling ceremony of Zhou Enlai's statue |
| 9–12 April | India | Bangalore; New Delhi | |
| 26–27 October | Russia | Moscow | |
| 4–7 December | France | Toulouse; Paris | Official visit. Wen met with National Assembly President Jean-Louis Debré, French prime minister Dominique de Villepin and French president Jacques Chirac. |
| 7–8 December | Slovakia | Bratislava | |
| 8–9 December | Czech Republic | Prague | |
| 9–10 December | Portugal | Lisbon | |
| 11–15 December | Malaysia | Kuala Lumpur | |

== 2006 ==
| Dates | Country | Location | Details |
|---|---|---|---|
| 1–4 April | Australia | Perth; Canberra; Sydney | |
| 4–5 April | Fiji | Nadi | |
| 5–7 April | New Zealand | Wellington; Auckland | |
| 7–8 April | Cambodia | Phnom Penh | |
| 17–18 June | Egypt | Cairo | |
| 18–19 June | Ghana | Accra | |
| 19–20 June | Republic of the Congo | Brazzaville | |
| 20–21 June | Angola | Luanda | Official visit. Wen held talks with Angolan Prime Minister Fernando da Piedade Dias dos Santos, and hold talks with Angolan President José Eduardo dos Santos. |
| 21–22 June | South Africa | Cape Town | Official visit. Wen held talks with South African president Thabo Mbeki, met with South African deputy president Phumzile Mlambo-Ngcuka, met with South African parliamentary leaders in Cape Town, and attended the first China-South Africa Business Cooperation Forum. |
| 22–23 June | Tanzania | Dar es Salaam | Official visit. Wen held talks with Tanzanian president Jakaya Kikwete, met with Tanzanian prime minister Edward Lowassa, paid tribute to the cemetery of Chinese experts in Tanzania and inspected the construction site. |
| 23–24 June | Uganda | Kampala | Official visit. Wen held talks with Ugandan President Yoweri Museveni, met with Ugandan Prime Minister Apolo Nsibambi, visited the Uganda AIDS Prevention and Treatment Center, and held talks with some Chinese ambassadors to Africa. |
| 9–12 September | Finland | Helsinki | Official visit. Wen and attended the 9th China-EU Summit and the 6th Asia-Europe Meeting. He held talks with Finnish prime minister Matti Vanhanen, met with Finnish president Tarja Halonen, and met with South Korean president Roh Moo-hyun, Vietnamese prime minister Nguyễn Tấn Dũng, Latvian president Vaira Vīķe-Freiberga, Polish prime minister Jarosław Kaczyński, Dutch prime minister Jan Peter Balkenende, Danish prime minister Anders Fogh Rasmussen, Slovenian prime minister Janez Janša, Slovak prime minister Robert Fico, Spanish prime minister José Luis Rodríguez Zapatero and Portuguese prime minister José Sócrates. |
| 12–13 September | United Kingdom | London | Working visit. Wen held talks with British prime minister Tony Blair, met with British Deputy Prime Minister John Prescott and members of the UK China Relations Group. |
| 13–14 September | Germany | Hamburg; Berlin | Working visit. Wen attended the opening ceremony of the second China-Europe Forum, held talks with German chancellor Angela Merkel, and met with German president Horst Köhler. |
| 14–16 September | Tajikistan | Dushanbe | Official visit. Wen attended the Fifth Meeting of Prime Ministers of the Shanghai Cooperation Organization Member States. He met with Tajik president Emomali Rahmon and held talks with Tajik prime minister Oqil Oqilov. He also met with Kyrgyz prime minister Felix Kulov, Kazakh prime minister Daniyal Akhmetov, Pakistani prime minister Shaukat Aziz, Afghan first vice president Ahmad Zia Massoud and Iranian vice president Ali Saeedlou. |

== 2007 ==
| Dates | Country | Location | Details |
|---|---|---|---|
| 13-16 January | Philippines | Cebu; Manila | |
| 10-11 April | South Korea | Seoul | |
| 11-13 April | Japan | Tokyo; Kyoto | |
| 2-3 November | Uzbekistan | Tashkent | |
| 3-4 November | Turkmenistan | Ashgabat | |
| 4-5 November | Belarus | Minsk | |
| 5-6 November | Russia | Moscow | |
| 18-22 November | Singapore | | |

== 2008 ==
| Dates | Country | Location | Details |
|---|---|---|---|
| 29–31 March | Laos | Vientiane | Official visit. Wen attended the Third Greater Mekong Subregion Economic Cooperation Leaders' Meeting. He met with Lao president Choummaly Sayasone and held talks with Lao prime minister Bouasone Bouphavanh. He also met with Thai prime minister Samak Sundaravej and Asian Development Bank president Haruhiko Kuroda. |
| 23–25 September | United States | New York City | |
| 27–29 October | Russia | Moscow | |
| 29–31 October | Kazakhstan | Astana | Official visit. Wen attended the 7th meeting of the Council of Prime Ministers of the Shanghai Cooperation Organization member states. He met with Kazakh president Nursultan Nazarbayev and held talks with Kazakh prime minister Karim Massimov. He also met with Iranian first vice president Parviz Davoodi and Mongolian prime minister Sanjaagiin Bayar. This visit was the first visit to Kazakhstan by a Chinese premier in seven years. |
| 13 December | Japan | Fukuoka | Attended the China–Japan–South Korea trilateral summit. Met with Japanese prime minister Tarō Asō and South Korean president Lee Myung-bak. |

== 2009 ==
| Dates | Country | Location | Details |
|---|---|---|---|
| 27–28 January | Switzerland | Zurich; Bern; Davos | |
| 28–29 January | Germany | Berlin | |
| 29–30 January | Belgium | Brussels | |
| 30–31 January | Spain | Madrid | Official visit. Wen held talks with Spanish prime minister José Luis Rodríguez Zapatero and met with Spanish King Juan Carlos I. |
| 31 January–2 February | United Kingdom | London | |
| 10–11 April | Thailand | Pattaya | |
| 20 May | Czech Republic | Prague | |
| 4–6 October | North Korea | Pyongyang | Official goodwill visit to the Democratic People's Republic of Korea. Wen held talks with North Korean premier Kim Yong-il and Workers' Party of Korea General Secretary Kim Jong Il, and met with Standing Committee of the Supreme People's Assembly Chairman Kim Yong-nam. He also paid tribute to the martyrs of the People's Volunteer Army, watched the North Korean version of the opera Dream of the Red Chamber with Kim Jong Il, and attended the celebration of the 60th anniversary of the establishment of diplomatic relations between China and North Korea and the closing ceremony of the China-North Korea Friendship Year. This is the first time that a Chinese premier has visited North Korea since Li Peng visited North Korea in May 1991. |
| 23–25 October | Thailand | Hua Hin | |
| 6–8 November | Egypt | Cairo; Sharm El Sheikh | |
| 17–18 December | Denmark | Copenhagen | |

== 2010 ==
| Dates | Country | Location | Details |
|---|---|---|---|
| 28–30 May | South Korea | Seoul; Jeju Island | |
| 30 May–1 April | Japan | Tokyo | |
| 1–2 April | Mongolia | Ulaanbaatar | |
| 2–3 April | Myanmar | Yangon | |
| 21–23 September | United States | New York City | |
| 2–4 October | Greece | Athens | |
| 4–6 October | Belgium | Brussels | |
| 5 October | Germany | Berlin; Schloss Meseberg | Wen met with German chancellor Angela Merkel. This trip was arranged on the spur of the moment outside the European schedule. |
| 6–7 October | Italy | Rome | |
| 7–9 October | Turkey | Ankara | Official visit. Wen held talks with Turkish prime minister Recep Tayyip Erdoğan and met with Turkish president Abdullah Gül. |
| 28–30 October | Vietnam | Hanoi | |
| 22–24 November | Russia | Saint Petersburg; Moscow | |
| 24–25 November | Tajikistan | Dushanbe | |
| 15–17 December | India | New Delhi | |
| 17–19 December | Pakistan | Islamabad | |

== 2011 ==
| Dates | Country | Location | Details |
|---|---|---|---|
| 27–28 April | Malaysia | Kuala Lumpur | |
| 28–30 April | Indonesia | Jakarta | |
| 21–22 May | Japan | Tokyo; Fukushima; Sendai, Natori | |
| 24–25 June | Hungary | Budapest | |
| 25–27 June | United Kingdom | Birmingham; London | |
| 27–28 June | Germany | Berlin | |
| 6–8 November | Russia | Saint Petersburg | |
| 17–20 November | Indonesia | Bali | |
| 20–21 November | Brunei | Bandar Seri Begawan | Official visit. Wen held talks with Sultan Hassanal Bolkiah. |

== 2012 ==
| Dates | Country | Location | Details |
|---|---|---|---|
| 14 January | Nepal | Kathmandu | |
| 14–16 January | Saudi Arabia | Riyadh | |
| 16–18 January | United Arab Emirates | Abu Dhabi; Dubai; Sharjah | |
| 18–19 January | Qatar | Doha | |
| 20–22 April | Iceland | Reykjavik | |
| 22–23 April | Germany | Hanover; Wolfsburg | |
| 23–25 April | Sweden | Gothenburg; Stockholm | |
| 25–27 April | Poland | Warsaw | |
| 19 June | Morocco | Casablanca | |
| 20–22 June | Brazil | Rio de Janeiro | |
| 22–23 June | Uruguay | Montevideo | |
| 23–25 June | Argentina | Buenos Aires | |
| 25–26 June | Chile | Santiago | |
| 27 June | Portugal | Terceira Island | On the way back to China from Latin America, Wen stopped at Terceira Island and interacted with local residents. |
| 19–20 September | Belgium | Brussels | |
| 4–6 November | Laos | Vientiane | |
| 18–20 November | Cambodia | Phnom Penh | |
| 20–21 November | Thailand | Bangkok | |
| 4–5 December | Kyrgyzstan | Bishkek | |
| 5–6 December | Russia | Moscow | |
