= Prince Henry of Prussia (1726–1802) =

Prussian general and diplomat

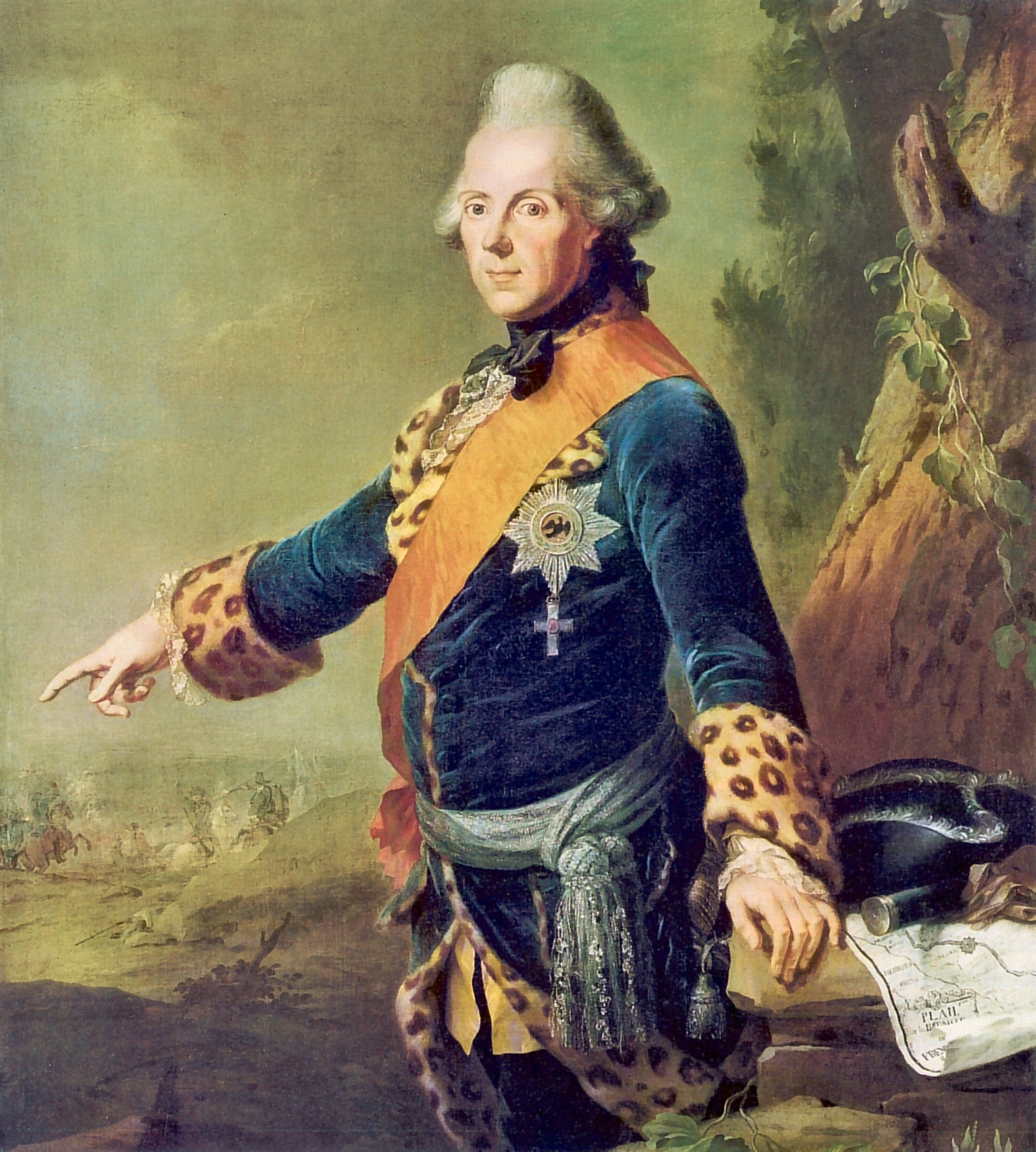
- Portrait of Prince Henry by Johann Heinrich Tischbein, 1769
- Born: 18 January 1726; Berlin, Prussia
- Died: 3 August 1802 (aged 76); Rheinsberg, Prussia
- Burial: Rheinsberg Palace, Rheinsberg, Germany
- Spouse: Princess Wilhelmina of Hesse-Kassel (m. 1752)
Names
- German: Friedrich Heinrich Ludwig; Frederick Henry Ludwig
- House: Hohenzollern
- Father: Frederick William I of Prussia
- Mother: Sophia Dorothea of Hanover
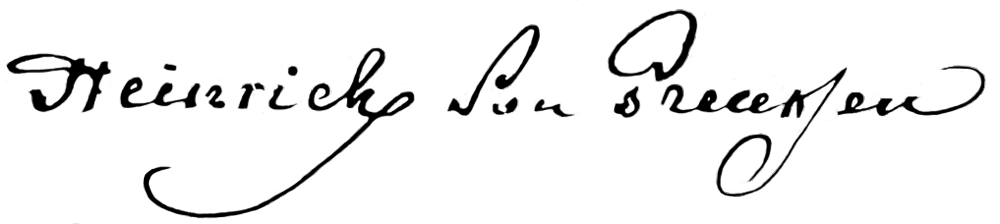
- Signature

Prince Frederick Henry Ludwig of Prussia (German: Friedrich Heinrich Ludwig; 18 January 1726 – 3 August 1802) was a Prussian general, statesman, and diplomat. He was a son of King Frederick William I of Prussia and Princess Sophia Dorothea of Hanover, and the younger brother of Frederick the Great. Prince Henry led Prussian armies in the Silesian Wars and the Seven Years' War, having never lost a battle in the latter. In 1786, he was suggested as a candidate to be a monarch in the United States.

== Biography ==
Born in Berlin, Henry was the 13th child of King Frederick William I of Prussia and Princess Sophia Dorothea of Hanover.

When he was only 14, Henry was appointed as Colonel of the 35th Infanterieregiment by Frederick after he became king in 1740, leading Henry to participate in the first two Silesian Wars. Henry's conflicts with his older brother, King Frederick II of Prussia, are almost legendary. Especially when he was young, the king bullied his little brother much like his father had bullied him. Although remarkably similar in appearance and tastes (both were fond of the arts and French literature, and both were exceptional military commanders) Henry resented being in Frederick's shadow while the latter excluded his brothers from all decisions about state affairs. Nonetheless, he loyally served as one of his brother's top generals throughout Frederick's reign. His military achievements eventually earned him the respect of his brother. Henry tended to be less aggressive than the King in battle; although he never won a victory of the scale of Rossbach or Leuthen (two of Frederick's greatest victories), his caution served him well as he was never defeated on the battlefield like his brother at Kolín or Kunersdorf. Henry lived in the shadow of his older brother and sometimes criticized the king's military strategies and foreign policies, although in later years the brothers became closer. In 1753 he published his memoirs under the pseudonym "Maréchal Gessler".

On 25 June 1752, Henry married Princess Wilhelmina of Hesse-Kassel in Charlottenburg Palace, but they had no children. Henry lived in Rheinsberg Palace after receiving it as a gift from his brother in 1744 who also had a grand palace built for him in Berlin between 1748 and 1753 (today the main building of the Humboldt University of Berlin). He also had an apartment in the City Palace, Potsdam, since he was regularly present at his brother's court there and in nearby Sanssouci.

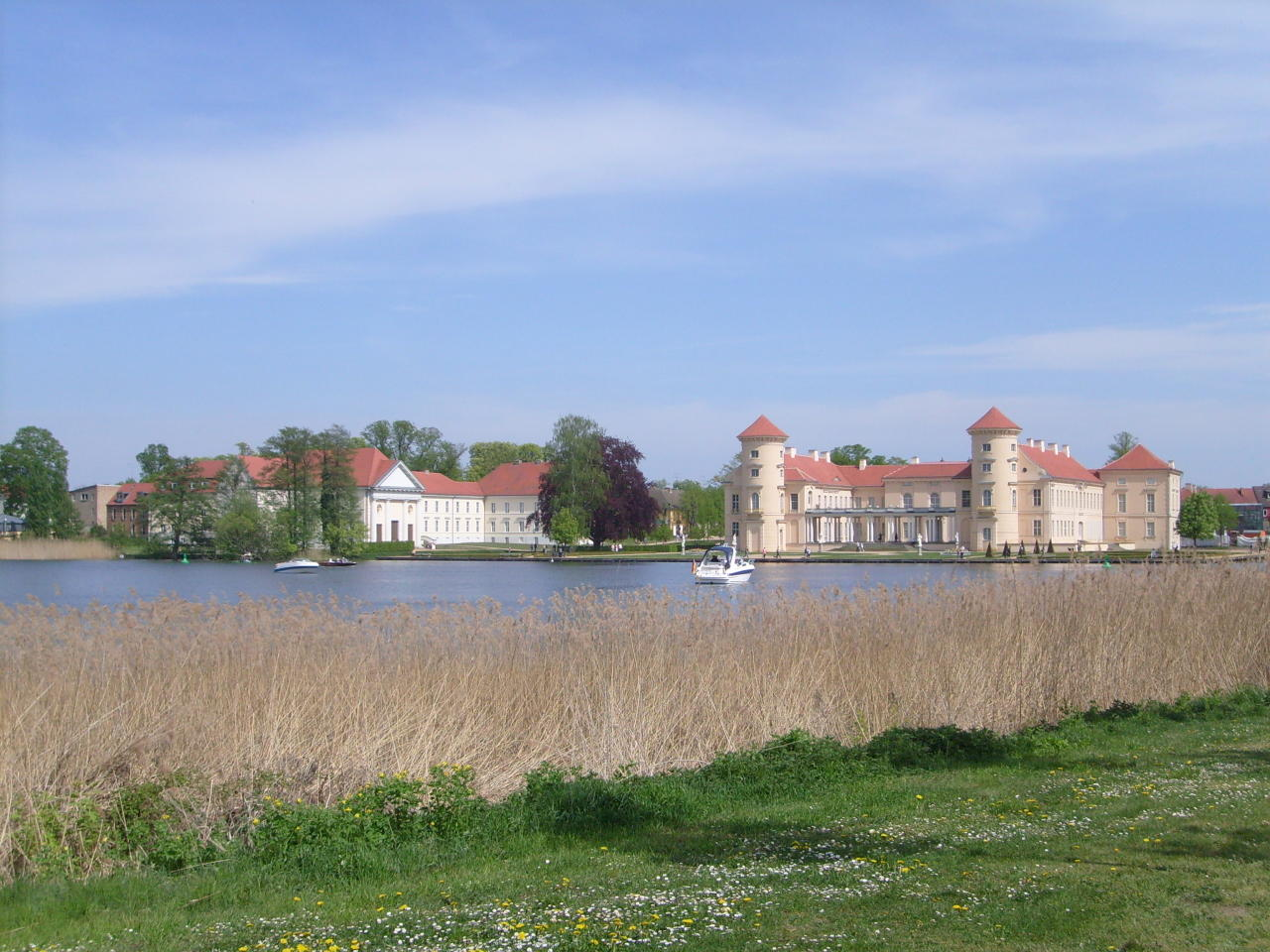
Rheinsberg Palace

Prince Henry's Palace, Berlin

Despite the marriage, he scarcely concealed his passion for other men and developed intimate friendships with the actor Pierre-Jean Fromentin de Blainville and the French emigre Count La Roche-Aymon. From 1758, his adjutant and main favorite was Friedrich Adolf, Count von Kalckreuth, the later field marshal, but in 1766 they fell out over the prince's wife. His longtime favourite, Major von Kaphengst, exploited the prince's interest in him to lead a dissipated, wasteful life at Schloss Meseberg, an estate not far from Rheinsberg which Henry had bought for him in 1774 for which he had sold 29 paintings from his collection to Catherine the Great. In 1784, Henry had to take out a loan of 130,000 thalers in France to pay off Kaphengst's debt; King Louis XVI of France personally vouched for it. But then he separated from his lover. The king, himself presumed to have been homosexual, tolerated his brother's love affairs, sometimes even pursuing them with jealousy, but despised Kaphengst and refused his promotion to colonel whereupon the latter took his leave.

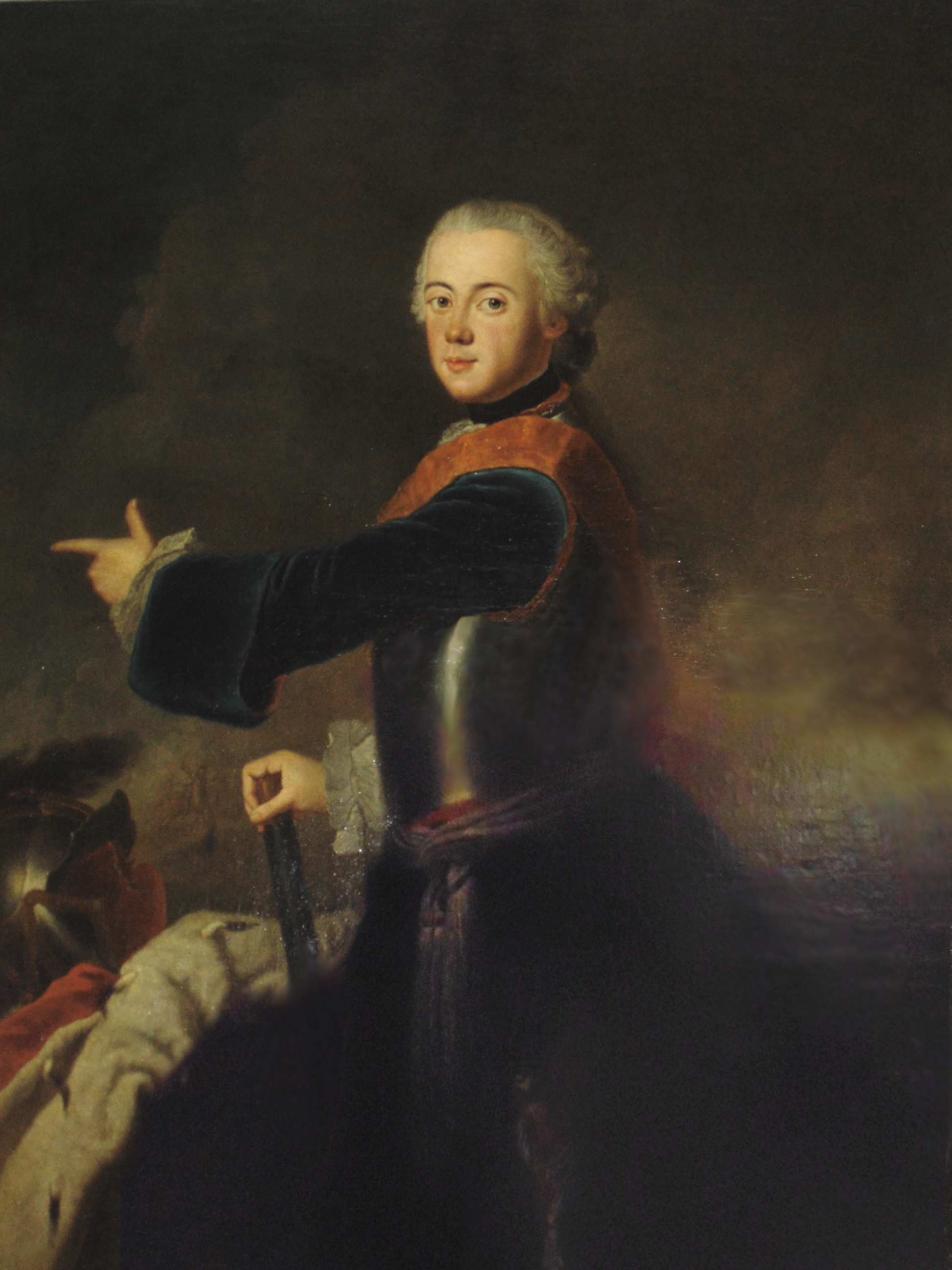
Portrait of Prince Henry by Antoine Pesne, 1745

Henry successfully led Prussian armies as a general during the Third Silesian War (1756–1763, part of the Seven Years' War). He greatly distinguished himself during his brother's victory at the Battle of Prague and fought during the Prussians' subsequent defeat at Kolin. After the Prussian Army's initial success against one wing of the joint Russian and Austrian Armies in the Battle of Kunersdorf, Henry urged his brother Frederick to stop attacking. The king, who had already sent a message of victory to Berlin, pressed the attack. The day ended with a virtually destroyed Prussian army, a virtually defenseless Kingdom of Prussia, and a complete victory by the Russo-Austrian force. Afterwards, Henry reorganized the routed Prussian forces. Frederick came to rely on his brother as commander of the Prussian forces in the east, Frederick's strategic flank. Henry later won his most famous victory at Freiberg in 1762, the final battle of the war between Austria and Prussia; during subsequent peace negotiations, Frederick wrote to him, "You alone have the honor of breaking down Austrian obstinacy." The statements of the contemporaries culminate in the legendary praise of the king, often quoted by biographers, that his brother was the only general who did not make any mistakes in the Seven Years' War.

After the Seven Years' War, Henry worked as a shrewd diplomat who helped plan the First Partition of Poland through trips to Stockholm and Saint Petersburg. During the War of the Bavarian Succession he commanded one of the two Prussian main armies, but saw little action. In the 1780s he made two diplomatic trips to France. He was a friend of Jean-Louis Favier.

Although the king treated him generously, which of course did not prevent Henry from often being short of money, Henry attempted to secure a principality for himself and twice tried to become King of Poland, but was opposed by a displeased Frederick. The king frustrated Henry's attempt to become ruler of a kingdom Catherine II of Russia planned to create in Wallachia.

== Proposal for King of the United States ==
In 1786, either Nathaniel Gorham, then-President of the Continental Congress, or Friedrich Wilhelm von Steuben, the Prussian general who served in the Continental Army, suggested to Alexander Hamilton that Henry should become monarch of the United States, but the prince declined and the new nation had no support for monarchy.

== Last years ==
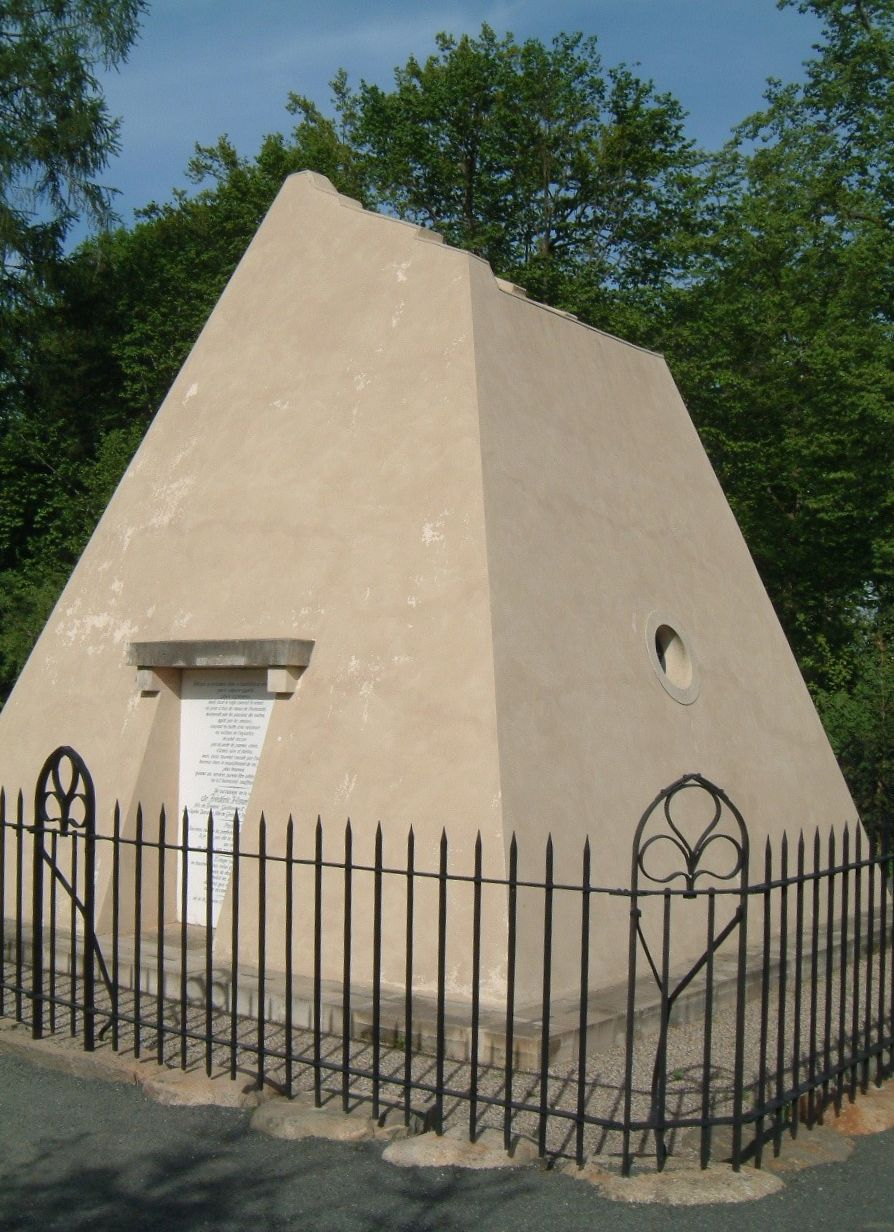
Prince Henry's grave in Rheinsberg Palace.

After the death of Frederick in 1786, Henry hoped to become more influential in the Prussian government as the advisor of his nephew, the new King Frederick William II of Prussia. Although he was less influential than he hoped, Henry was more important during the last years of his life in advising King Frederick William III, who began his reign in 1797.

In 1784, Henry had made a journey of several months to Paris; in October 1788 he went there for the second time, frequented the court of Versailles and met the politically influential circles of the capital, and also visited the Duke of Orléans (soon to become "Philippe Égalité") in the Château du Raincy. He returned to Rheinsberg in good time in March 1789, before the Storming of the Bastille began in July.

From 1798 to 1801 Henry spent a few weeks in August at Königs Wusterhausen Castle, his father's hunting lodge and favorite place to stay, out of sentimental memories to where he had spent his childhood vacations. His youngest brother Ferdinand accompanied him there several times.

Voltaire had seen in Frederick the embodiment of his "Philosopher King". Arguably, Henry was by deed the man Voltaire had hoped the "Age of Reason" would produce. The Swedish ambassador, count Carl Gustaf Tessin, a fierce opponent of the king, had written as early as 1760: "Prince Henry is equal to his royal brother in the art of war, superior in virtue. Many Henrys would make the world happy, just as two Fredericks would destroy it."

Henry died at Rheinsberg Palace on 3 August 1802, at the age of 76.

== Ancestry ==
Ancestors of Prince Henry of Prussia (1726–1802)

8. Frederick William, Elector of Brandenburg
4. Frederick I of Prussia
9. Louise Henriette of Orange-Nassau
2. Frederick William I of Prussia
10. Ernest Augustus, Elector of Hanover (=12)
5. Sophia Charlotte of Hanover
11. Sophia of the Palatinate (=13)
1. Prince Henry of Prussia
12. Ernest Augustus, Elector of Hanover (=10)
6. George I of Great Britain
13. Sophia of the Palatinate (=11)
3. Sophia Dorothea of Hanover
14. George William, Duke of Brunswick-Lüneburg
7. Sophia Dorothea of Celle
15. Éléonore Desmier d'Olbreuse
