= Jacques-Joachim Trotti, marquis de La Chétardie =

French diplomat (1705–1759)

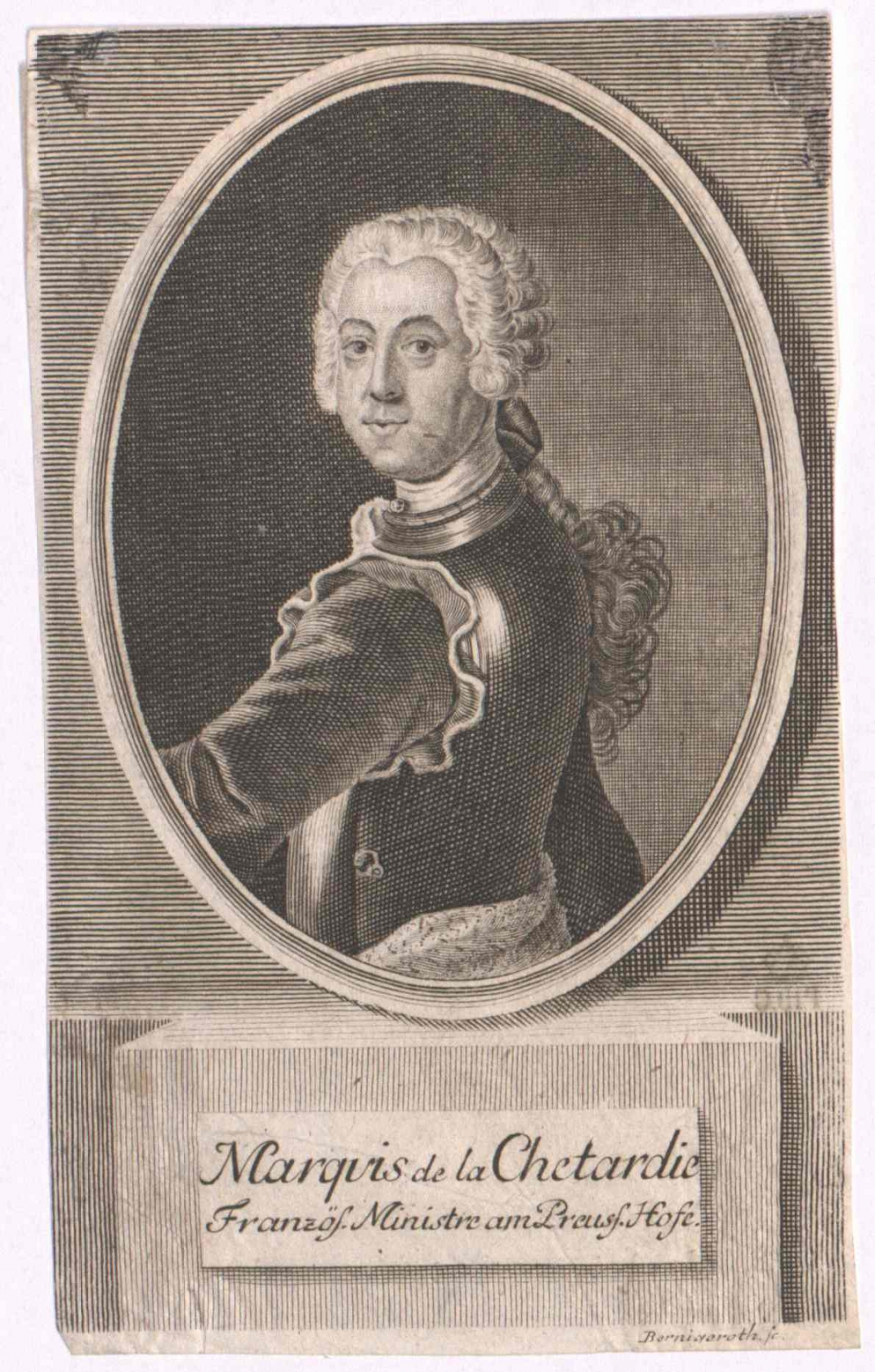
Engraving, 18th century

Jacques-Joachim Trotti, marquis de La Chétardie (3 October 1705 – 1 January 1759) was a French diplomat who engineered the coup d'etat that brought Elizaveta Petrovna to the Russian throne in 1741. In the course of his eventful career, La Chetardie was sent on diplomatic errands throughout Europe: in London (1727), then in Holland and Prussia, in Russia twice, and finally in Turin in 1749 in the company of Jean-Louis Favier.

When he arrived as ambassador to Saint Petersburg in 1739, he found all the key positions in the imperial administration in the hands of ethnic Germans, inimical to his own country. In order to counterbalance their influence, La Chetardie approached his compatriot, Count Lestocq, and the Swedish ambassador, who was preparing the war with Russia. Their complex manoeuvring resulted in the coup d'etat which made Peter the Great's daughter Elizaveta the new Empress.

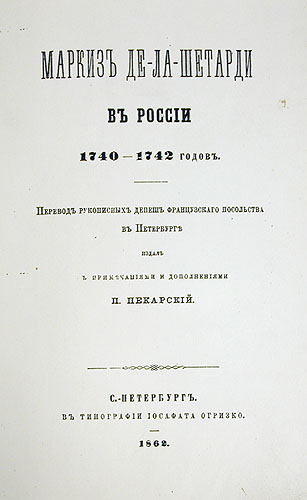
The front page of the 1862 edition of La Chetardie's dispatches.

Upon her accession to the throne, she awarded La Chetardie with the Order of Saint Andrew and Order of Saint Anna, and he triumphantly returned to Paris, rather naively expecting (and persuading his peers in Versailles) that Elizaveta would abolish her father's reforms, restore the capital to Moscow, and return Russia to its pre-Petrine state, when the Russian diplomacy had not dared to meddle with French designs. Yet he proved to be mistaken as Elizabeth persevered in establishing Russia as a great power to be reckoned with, entrusting the task to the Austrophilic Chancellor Bestuzhev.

In 1743 La Chetardie was again in the Russian capital, clamoring for attention from the Empress and busily intriguing with Elizabeth of Holstein (Catherine II's mother) and Lestocq against Bestuzhev. Their correspondence was intercepted by the latter's agents and divulged to the Empress, who ordered the intriguer to be expelled from the country. The disgruntled Louis XV had him immured in the citadel of Montpellier. Upon his release, La Chetardie took part in the Battle of Rossbach and served as the castellan of Hanau, where he died.

== Further reading and references ==
- Joseph Fitzgerald Molloy. The Russian Court in the Eighteenth Century. Hutchinson, 1905.
