= Robert Wolke =

American chemist (1928–2021)

Robert L. Wolke
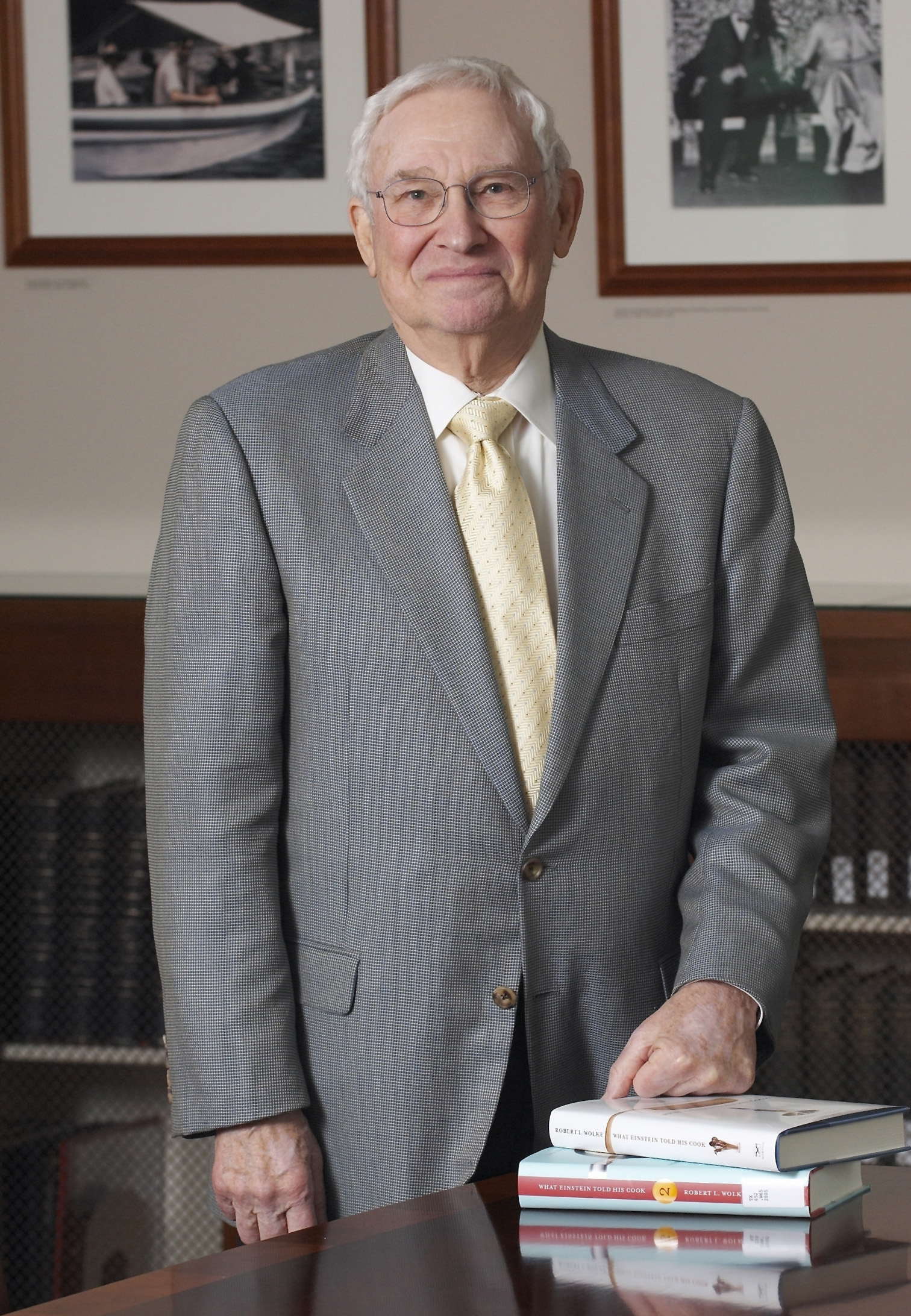
- Wolke in 2006
- Born: April 2, 1928; New York City, New York
- Died: August 29, 2021 (age 93); Mount Washington, Pennsylvania
- Awards: James T. Grady-James H. Stack Award for Interpreting Chemistry; International Association of Culinary Professionals
- Scientific career
- Fields: Chemistry
- Workplaces: University of Pittsburgh

Robert L. Wolke (/wɔːlk/; April 2, 1928 – August 29, 2021) was an American chemist and professor emeritus of chemistry at the University of Pittsburgh. He was a food columnist for The Washington Post and wrote multiple books to explain everyday phenomena in non-technical terms:

- What Einstein Didn't Know: Scientific Answers to Everyday Questions answers everyday questions (e.g., "Why do car batteries go dead in winter?" and "Why does warm beer go flat?"), attempting to explain scientifically without using technical terms (though it often shows technical terms after their definitions). It also contains bar bets and "Try it" experiments related to the current subject.
- What Einstein Told His Barber: More Scientific Answers to Everyday Questions, a nonfiction book, is the sequel to What Einstein Didn't Know: Scientific Answers to Everyday Questions.
- What Einstein Told His Cook: Kitchen Science Explained answers common food science questions. The book also contains recipes by Wolke's wife, Marlene Parrish. Both the James Beard Foundation and International Association of Culinary Professionals nominated this book as 2005's best technical or reference book.
- What Einstein Told His Cook 2, the Sequel: Further Adventures in Kitchen Science (ISBN 0-393-05869-7) is a nonfiction book and sequel to What Einstein Told His Cook: Kitchen Science Explained. It answers common questions related to kitchen science.

== Awards ==
Wolke won awards such as the American Chemical Society's 2005 James T. Grady-James H. Stack Award for Interpreting Chemistry for the Public, the International Association of Culinary Professionals' Bert Greene Award, and the James Beard Foundation's award for the best newspaper column.

== Death ==
Wolke died on August 29, 2021, of complications from Alzheimer's disease. He was 93.
