= Jean-Louis Favier =

French diplomat and writer

Jean-Louis Favier (1711 – 1784) was a French diplomat and publicist. His memoirs are an important source for Russian history under Empress Elisabeth of Russia.

== Life ==
Favier was born in Toulouse, France.

Up to the age of thirty he spent traveling. In 1749, he arrived in Turin with the Marquis de La Chetardie, French ambassador to Charles Emmanuel III, the King of Sardinia. He undertook secret missions for Louis XV in Spain and Russia. Then he traveled to England, Holland, Austrian Netherlands, and returned to Paris. Because of his friendship with Prince Henry of Prussia, in 1773 he was captured in Hamburg and imprisoned in the Bastille.

He wrote multiple essays on history and politics.

He died in Paris.

== Works ==
- «Essai historique et politique sur le gouvernement présent de la Hollande» (1748),
- «Mémoires secrets de Bolingbroke» (1754).
- «Doutes et questions sur le traité de Versailles entre le roi de France et la reine de Hongrie» (1778),
- Conjectures raisonnées sur la situation actuelle de la France dans le système politique de l'Europe, published in 1793 under the title of Politique de tous les cabinets de l'Europe pendant les règnes de Louis XV et de Louis XVI, which explains his doctrine, based on the alliance with Prussia.*
