= Lessig =

Lessig is a German surname of Slavic origin. The original Sorbian form, Lěsnik, means either "forest dweller" or "woodman", lěs meaning "wood forest". Notable people with the surname include:

- Adolph Lessig (1869–1935), American union leader
- Lawrence Lessig (born 1961), American academic, attorney, and political activist

== See also ==
- Lessing
