= Elizabeth Pennisi =

American science journalist

- Education: Cornell University; Boston University
- Occupation: Science journalist
- Years active: 1996–present
- Awards: James T. Grady-James H. Stack Award for Interpreting Chemistry (1996)

Elizabeth Pennisi is an American science journalist specializing in genomics, evolution, and microbiology.

== Life ==
Pennisi completed a bachelor's degree in biology at Cornell University. She earned a master's degree in science writing from Boston University.

Pennisi worked for the public relations office of a university where she wrote for the school's science magazine. She also worked briefly with United Press International. Pennisi joined Science in 1996 and became an editor in 2007. She also writes for Science News for which she won the 1996 James T. Grady-James H. Stack Award for Interpreting Chemistry.
