= Lessor (disambiguation) =

Lessor may refer to:

- Lessor (leasing), the owner of leased property or the agent authorized on the owner's behalf
- Lessor, Wisconsin, a town in U.S.A.
- Lessor Township, Minnesota, U.S.A.

== See also ==
- Lesser
