= Daniel Q. Posin =

Physicist and science educator

- Daniel Posin in 1959
- Born: Turkestan
- Died: May 21, 2003 (aged 93–94); New Orleans
- Education: PhD in Physics, 1935
- Alma mater: University of California, Berkeley
- Known for: Science education on television
- Spouse: Frances "Patsy" Posin (née Schweitzer)
- Children: Dan Q. Posin Jr., Kathryn Posin
- Awards: James T. Grady-James H. Stack Award for Interpreting Chemistry
- Scientific career
- Fields: Physics
- Institutions: Massachusetts Institute of Technology, North Dakota Agricultural College, DePaul University, San Francisco State University
- Thesis: A study of the Townsend coefficients for ionization by collision in N₂, including a study of the effect of space charge field distortion upon these coefficients

Daniel Q. Posin (1909–2003) was an American physicist. He was born in 1909 in Russian Turkestan, close to the Caspian Sea. When he was six years old his family fled the Russian revolution, and in a journey that took three years he made it to Mongolia and finally to the United States, the final leg of the journey on a cattle boat to San Francisco. He attended the University of California at Berkeley, graduating Phi Beta Kappa, and earning a Ph.D. in physics.

== Teaching ==
Posin worked as a teaching assistant at Berkeley for two years, and then accepted a position teaching physics from 1937-41 in Panama. He returned to the US and taught at Montana State University and the Montana School of Mines until 1944, when he went to the Massachusetts Institute of Technology (MIT) and performed research on radar and radioactivity. At MIT he also met Albert Einstein. It was Einstein who urged him to teach ordinary people about the peaceful uses of atomic power, and that led to Posin writing the book I Have Been to the Village. Posin gave more than 3,000 lectures about nuclear power and his position on peaceful use won him six nominations for the Nobel Peace Prize.

In 1946 Posin became chairman of the physics department at North Dakota Agricultural College in Fargo. In 1955, Posin, along with Cecil Haver and Baldur Kristjanson (Assistant Professors of Agricultural Economics), and William B. Treumann (Professor of Chemistry), was asked to resign by University President Frederick Hultz in what became known as "The Purge". In 1956, he took a position teaching physics at DePaul University. From 1967 until 1996 Dr. Posin taught Astronomy, Earth Science and Physics at San Francisco State University. He often promoted humanitarian relief efforts such as Project Guatemala in 1974 during his tenure there.

== Television ==
In his television career he explained astronomy, physics and space. He won six Emmys for his educational series broadcast by WGN and WTTW, including "Dr. Posin's Universe", "The Universe Around Us", "On the Shoulders of Giants", and "Out of This World". He served as an on-air consultant for WGN during the 1960s space race.

== Recognition ==
Posin was awarded six Emmy awards for his for educational programming in television. Also, in 1972 he was given the James T. Grady-James H. Stack Award for Interpreting Chemistry. He was nominated for the Nobel Peace Prize six times.

== Later life ==
In 1967 Posin began teaching physics again at San Francisco State University where he taught physics and earth sciences until he retired in 1996 at the age of 87. Posin died at the age of 93 at the Woldenberg Village Nursing Home in New Orleans. Throughout his life he was "resolutely nonreligious," according to his daughter Kathryn. However, his wife adopted the Baháʼí Faith, and he expressed desire “to go where she’s going.”

== Books ==
His book I Have Been to the Village includes a quote by Einstein, who wrote: "Dr. Dan Q. Posin's book bears eloquent witness to the sincere and self-sacrificing way in which the ablest among the scientists try to fulfill their duty toward the community." Posin authored over 30 books, including Dr. Posin's Giants: Men of Science, Out of This World, Mendeleyev: The Story of a Great Scientist, Exploring and Understanding Our Solar System, What is a star (The What is it series), What is Chemistry, What is Electronic Communication, Science in the Age of Space, Chemistry for the Space Age, Find Out! First Step to the Future, and PHYSICS: Its Marvels and Mysteries.
