= Christian Ludwig von Kaphengst =

Prussian officer (1743–1800)

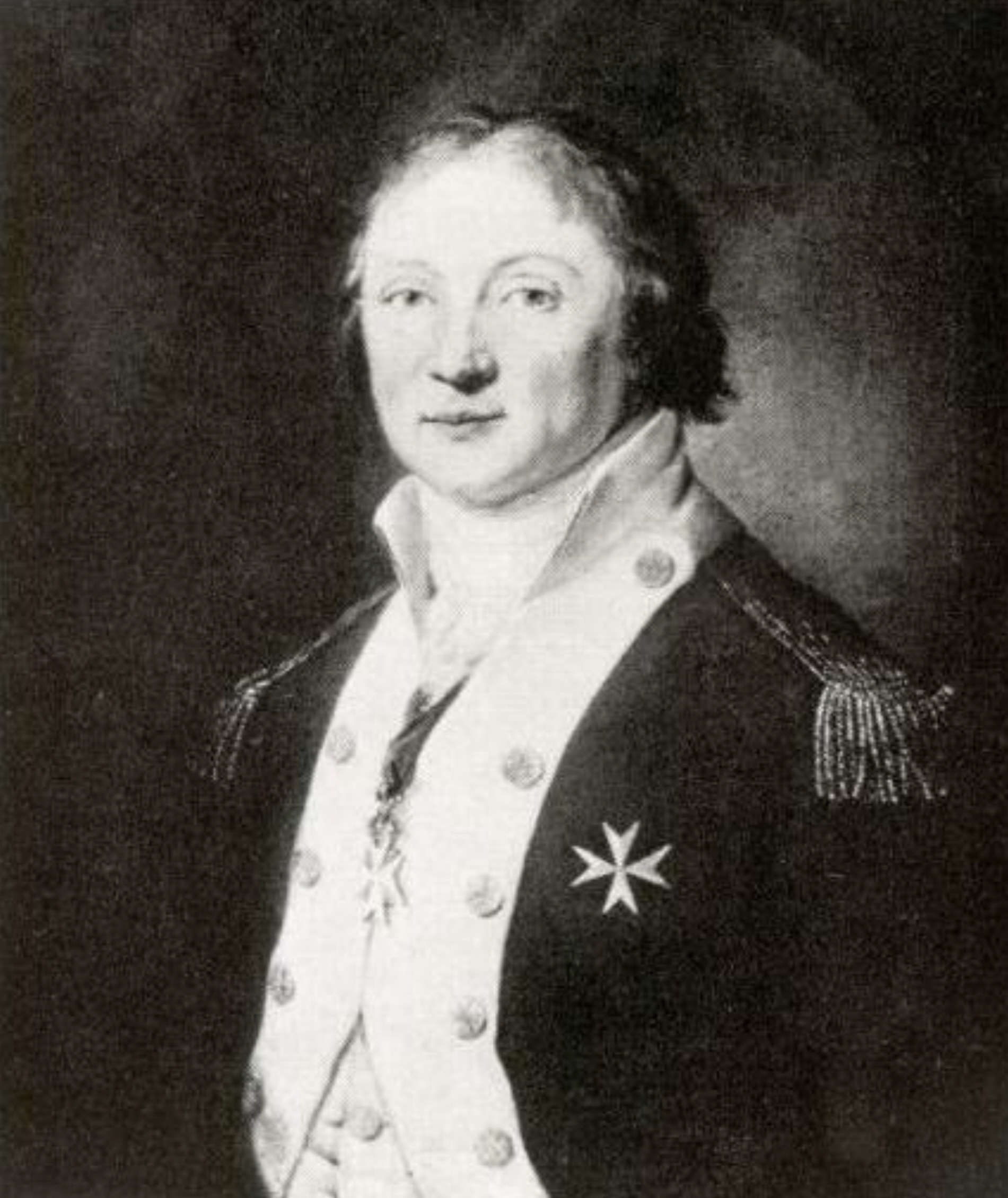
Portrait of major Ch. L.v. Kaphengst by Anton Graff

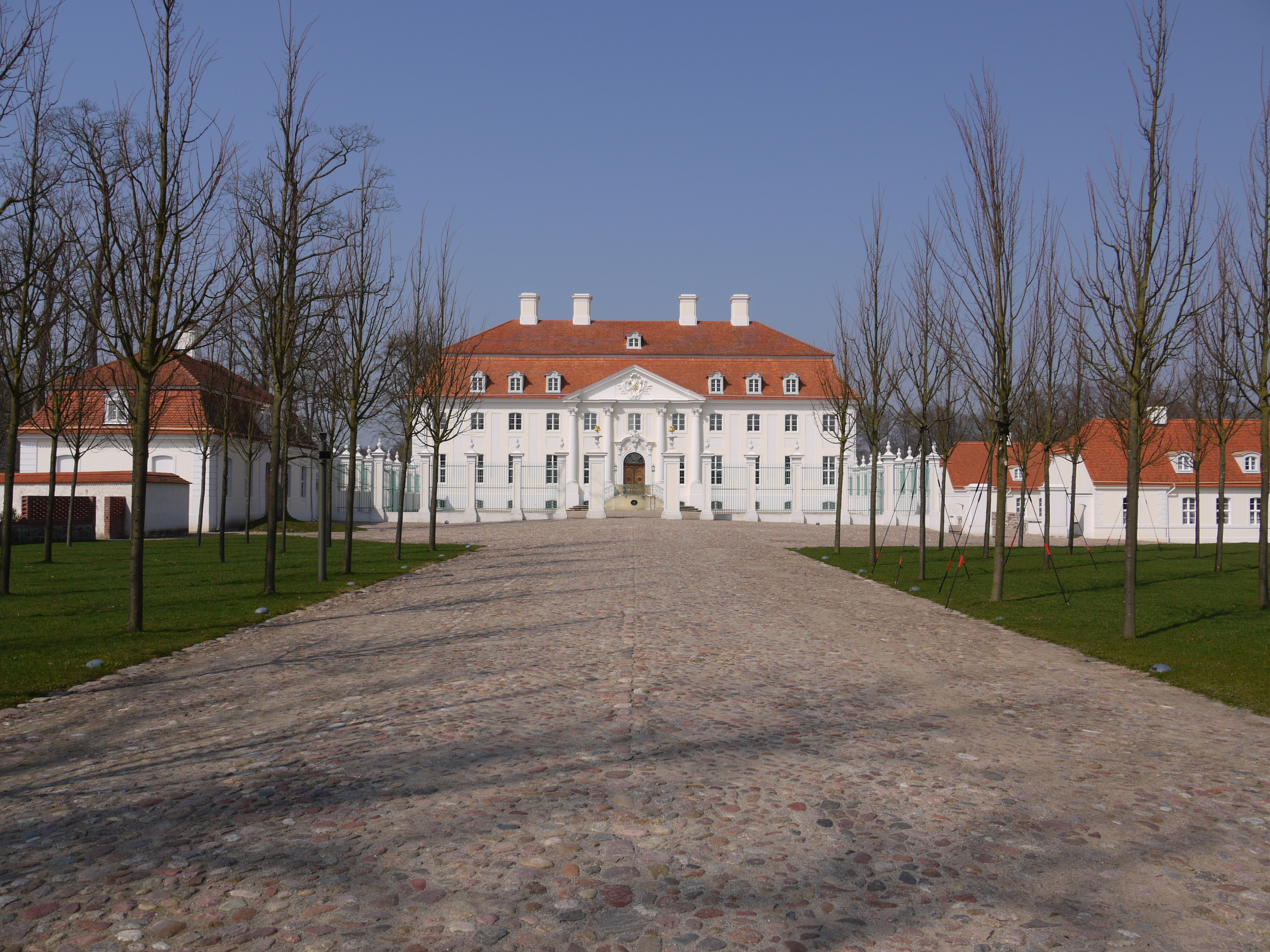
Schloss Meseberg

Christian Ludwig von Kaphengst (German pronunciation: [ˈkapˈhɛŋst]; 1743–1800) was a major in the Prussian Army, an adjutant, close friend, and lover of Prince Henry of Prussia, the brother of Frederick the Great.

== Life ==
Christian Ludwig von Kaphengst was born on 25 November 1743 in Galitz, Prussia. His father was Albrecht Christian von Kaphengst. Thiébault portrayed him in his memoirs as "a tall, cheerful, courageous and witty man of extraordinary physical strength, who could make any company laugh."

Kaphengst exploited the very short prince's interest in him to lead a dissipated, wasteful life at Schloss Meseberg, an estate not far from Rheinsberg Palace which Henry had bought for him and given him as a present in 1774, for which he had sold 29 paintings from his collection to Catherine the Great. A spiral staircase between the master's bedroom and the prince's guest room has survived to this day. Nevertheless, Kaphengst mostly lived in Berlin. Of course, it was just a coincidence that his old-noble family name ended in -hengst, which means stallion in German.

In 1784, Henry had to take out a loan of 130,000 thalers in France to pay off Kaphengst's debt; King Louis XVI personally vouched for it. (For comparison: a day laborer earned about 50 thalers a year, a craftsman 70, a teacher between 80 and 200.) But then, the prince separated from his lover. The king tolerated his brother's love affairs, sometimes even pursuing them with jealousy, but despised Kaphengst and brusquely refused his promotion to colonel whereupon the latter took his leave.

But Kaphengst then married and fathered five children, limited to the modest earnings and taxes of the occupants of his manorial estate while the king refused him a pension. He died at the age of 56 after a long illness in Schloss Meseberg, survived by 2 years by his patron who was 17 years his senior.
