= Gene Bylinsky =

Yugoslavian-American journalist

Gene Bylinsky (1930–2008) was a journalist and author known for his science and technology reporting. He was a writer for Fortune magazine from 1966 to 2001, where he was known as one of the first journalists to report on the burgeoning technology industry in Northern California's Santa Clara County, which would be later known as Silicon Valley. He served on the board of editors for Fortune, and continued writing for the magazine as a special contributor after his 2001 retirement.

He was awarded a Lasker Award for medical journalism and a James T. Grady Award for explaining chemistry to a general audience as part of his reportage.

He also wrote for the newspapers The National Observer, The Wall Street Journal, and the Newhouse Newspaper in Washington DC. He was a member of the White House Press Corps.

Bylinsky was the author of four books: The Innovation Millionaires (1976), Mood Control (1980), Life in Darwin's Universe (1982), and Silicon Valley: High Tech Window to the Future (1985). In Darwin's Universe, Bylinsky speculates on alien life forms that may exist in the universe. He describes different species of plants and animals in the universe, both in the present and past. The book featured paintings of these alien species from Wayne McLoughlin. In a briefly noted review in the New York Times, science writer Timothy Ferris noted that the source material used by Bylinsky was only partially expounded upon and refined, therefore he noted that those familiar with such source material would find the book predictable. Darwin's Universe was a finalist for the National Book Award in the science category.

His book Mood Control documented the latest drugs, diets and other techniques used to enhance the mind. In Mood Control, Bylinski interviews scientists who claim to have developed a drug that can enhance a person's creativity; leading to greater output in writing. Reviewing the book for The New York Times Anatole Broyard noted that such a drug would detract from the beauty of literature. Broyard remarked that the diligence, struggle, and perseverance during the development of authors' works can be inferred from the readers and that such characteristics add beauty to the work. Broyard noted that such beauty would be lost on works by enhanced authors.

Bylinkshy was born in Belgrade, Yugoslavia and immigrated to the United States.
