= Lawrence Lessing =

20th-century American science writer

Lawrence P. Lessing is an American science writer.

A native of Buffalo, New York, he started his career as a newspaper man in Pittsburgh. There he was a correspondent for Time magazine. He was a long-time member of the board of editors of Fortune magazine, where he contributed articles on electronics, jet propulsion, automation, metallurgy.

From 1953 to 1955, he was an editor and contributor to Scientific American. Lessing won the 1965 AAAS-Westinghouse Science Journalism Award for his article in Fortune on the causes of earthquakes. Lessing is the author of three books, Man of High Fidelity: Edwin Howard Armstrong (1956), Understanding Chemistry (1957), and DNA: at the core of life itself (1967). He was for some time on the editorial board of Fortune magazine and was a vigorous opponent of government interference with and distortion of scientific fact (see, for instance, his essay "In Defense of Science", and "Man of High Fidelity").

Lawrence Lessing collaborated with graphic designer Will Burtin for more than twenty years. The two are best known for the juxtaposition of Burtin's graphics with Lessing's descriptive copy. In a wartime project commissioned in 1942 by The Office of Strategic Services (OSS) on behalf of the U.S. Army Air Forces (USAAF), Burtin and Lessing created aerial gunnery manuals to teach new bomber crew gunners how to range and aim their Browning machine guns in order to hit fast–moving enemy fighters.

The two worked together again at Fortune magazine from 1945: Burtin became the magazine's art director, Lessing a noted science and technology writer and editor. Burtin started his own graphic design company in 1949, commissioning Lessing to write much of the text for the designer's science–based projects. Their collaboration extended through a series of Burtin's large-scale medical models from the late 1950s, ending only with Burtin's death in 1971.

== Works ==
- Man of High Fidelity: Edwin Howard Armstrong Lawrence Lessing. Lippincott; (1956) OCLC 1109641
- Understanding Chemistry. Lawrence Lessing. Interscience Publishers (1957) ISBN 978-0-451-02260-8
- DNA: At the Core of Life Itself Lawrence P. Lessing. Macmillan Publishing Company (1967) ISBN 978-0-02-571590-5

== Honors ==
- James T. Grady-James H. Stack Award for Interpreting Chemistry (1963)
- AAAS-Westinghouse Science Journalism Award (1965)
