= Ada Lessing =

German and Czechoslovak journalist and politician

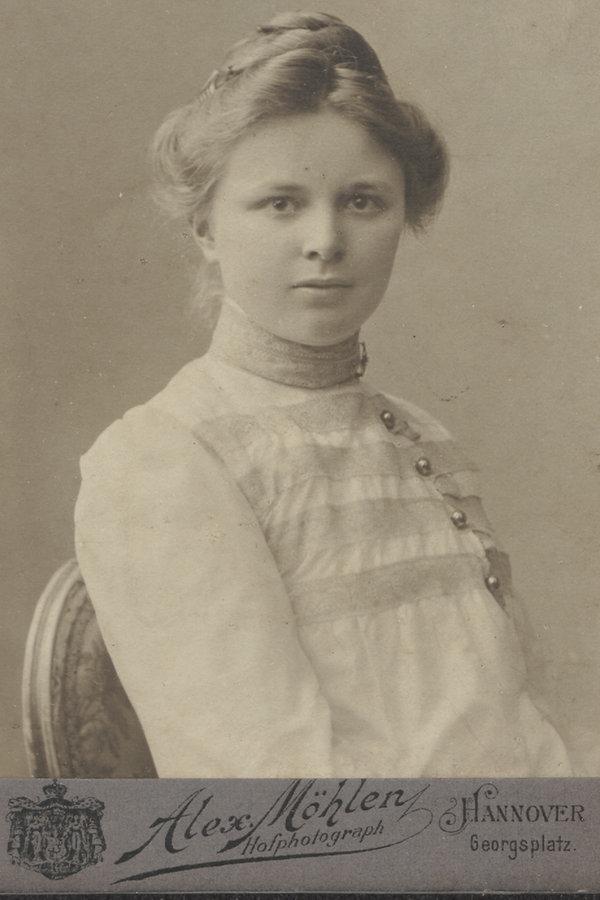
- Born: Ada Lessing; 16 February 1883; Hanover, German Empire
- Died: 10 November 1953 (aged 70); Hameln, West Germany
- Occupations: Journalist, politician
- Spouses: Ernst Grote, Theodor Lessing
- Children: Ruth Lessing

Ada Lessing (16 February 1883 in Hanover - 10 November 1953 in Hameln) was a German and Czechoslovak journalist and politician who was a pioneer in the field of German adult education. She, with her husband Theodor Lessing, founded the first adult education center in Hanover, of which she became the first chief administrator.

== Life and career ==
Ada Lessing was born Adele Minna Abbenthern on February 16, 1883, the eldest of three children. Her father, Bodo Abbenthern, was a businessman. Ada grew up in Eilenriede, where her father managed the Bischofshol restaurant and hotel.

In 1902, Lessing married 31-year-old Ernst Grote, and moved with him to Kirchrode-Bemerode-Wülferode. 2 years later, in 1904, the two separated, and Lessing moved back in with her parents.

In 1907, after the death of her mother, Lessing moved to Berlin, where she studied stenography and English. She briefly worked at a children's home near Cottbus, before taking a job as a publishing clerk for Schönheit magazine, where she primarily wrote book reviews.

Lessing met popular philosopher Theodor Lessing around 1909, and they were married in 1912. Both had had previous marriages. They had a daughter named Ruth Lessing.

At the onset of World War I, Lessing became involved with the Social Democratic Party of Germany, publicly advocating for their woman's suffrage campaign. She became a member of the party when the campaign was successful.

In 1919, the Lessings established and led a project to develop vocational and liberal arts courses in Hanover. In January 1920, the project, called Volkshochschule Hannover (Adult Education Center of Hanover) opened, and Ada took the role of chief administrator. In this role, Lessing managed and organized the center's instructional program, bringing in volunteer teachers and implementing a decentralized classroom system. In addition to this, Lessing taught various classes at the school herself. She was removed from her position in March 1933, after the Nazis "cleansed" Hanover of Jewish people. There was a constant struggle for program funding throughout Lessing's tenure.

Lessing became a parliament candidate of the Social Democratic Party of Germany in the March 1933 German federal election, in the midst of the Nazi seizure of power. Her husband Theodor, who faced persecution for being Jewish and Socialist and had had his teaching license revoked, had fled to Marienbad, Czechoslovakia, where he was murdered in August 1933. Ada had followed Theodor to Marienbad and remained there after his death, obtaining Czechoslovak citizenship in 1937. Lessing fled to Great Britain before the arrival of German troops in Czechoslovakia, where she would work at a children's home in Wales.

in 1946, after the war ended, Lessing moved back to Hanover, hoping to return to her position at Volkshochschule Hannover. She was not able to return to Hannover, however, and was instead appointed by then Lower Saxony minister of education Adolf Grimme as a consultant for a teacher reeducation program and commissioned to develop and run an advanced teacher training institute near Hameln. She held this position until her death. From July 16, 1951, to November 9, 1952, Lessing was a representative for the Social Democratic Party of Germany in the Hameln-Pyrmont district council, and was active in its welfare and health committee.

Lessing died of leukemia on November 10, 1953. Her daughter, Ruth, took over management of the teacher training institute until it closed in 1970.

== Legacy ==
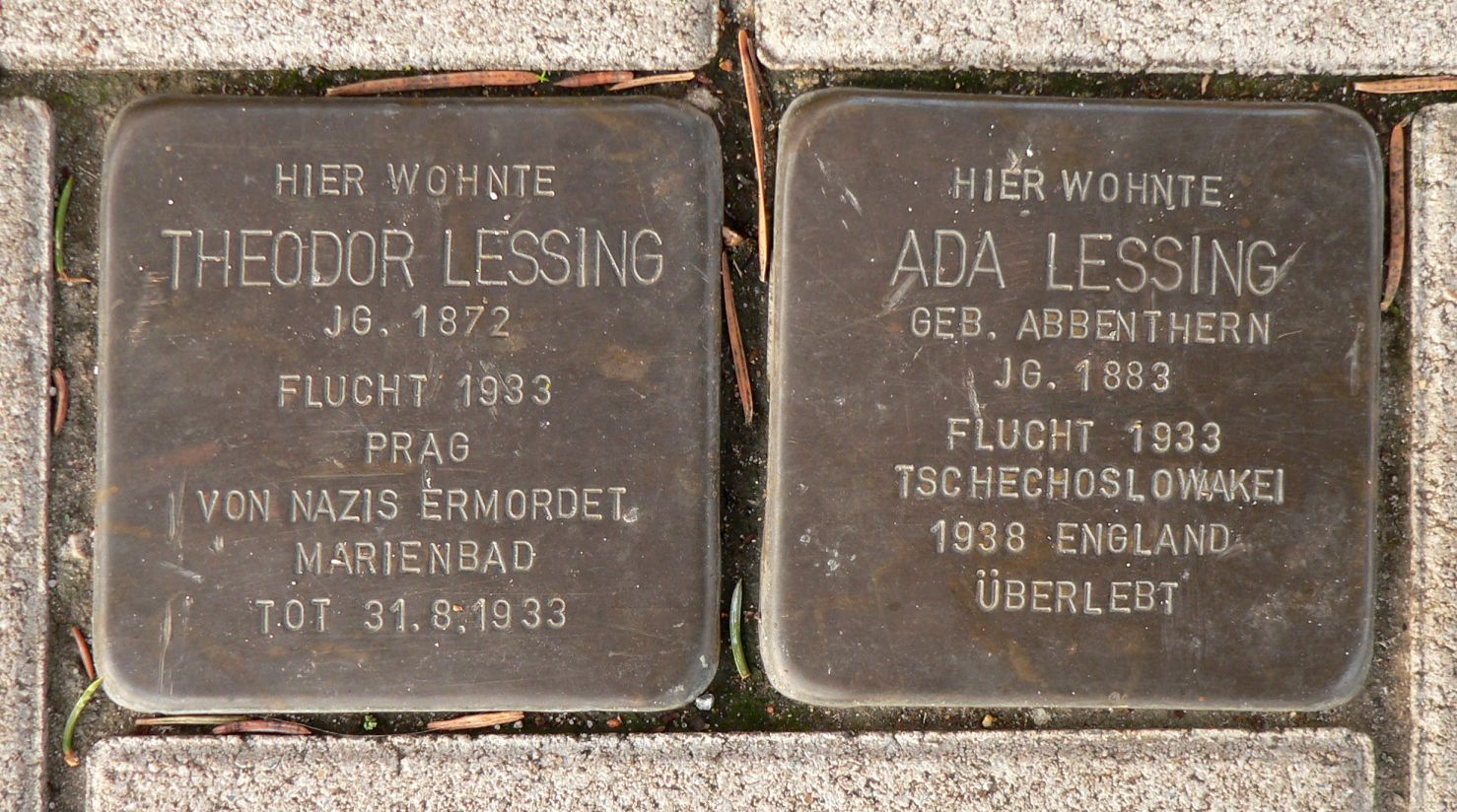
Stolperstein for Theodor and Ada Lessing in front of their Hanover house

Lessing has been honored in the names of multiple schools. In 1999, a secondary school in Hanover was named Ada Lessing Secondary School in her honor. In 2006, Volkshochschule Hannover, the adult education center founded and managed by the Lessings, was renamed by the city of Hanover ”Ada und Theodor Lessing Volkshochschule“ in recognition of the Lessings. In 2011, a Stolperstein was placed in front of the Lessings former Hanover home to commemorate them as victims of Nazi terror.
