= Theodor Lessing =

German philosopher

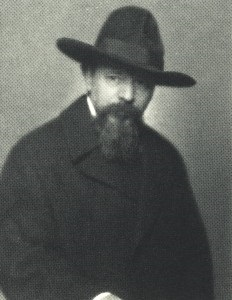
- Lessing between 1925 and 1930
- Born: 8 February 1872; Hanover, German Empire
- Died: 31 August 1933 (aged 61); Marienbad, Czechoslovakia
- Spouses: Maria Margarete Adele Pauline Friederike Stach von Goltzheim (m. 1900; div. c. 1912); Ada Lessing (m. c. 1912)
- Children: Miriam Lessing (with Maria); Judith Lessing (with Maria); Ruth Lessing (Ruth Gorny) (with Ada Lessing)

Education
- Education: University of Göttingen

Philosophical work
- Era: 20th-century philosophy
- Region: Western philosophy
- School: Munich phenomenology
- Institutions: University of Hannover
- Main interests: Political philosophy
- Notable works: Der jüdische Selbsthaß
- Notable ideas: Jewish self-hatred

Karl Theodor Richard Lessing (8 February 1872 – 31 August 1933) was a German philosopher.

He is known for opposing the rise of Hindenburg as president of the Weimar Republic and for his classic work on Jewish self-hatred (Der jüdische Selbsthaß), a book which he published in 1930, three years before Adolf Hitler came to power, in which he tried to explain the phenomenon of Jewish intellectuals who incited antisemitism against the Jewish people and who regarded Judaism as the source of evil in the world.

Born into an upper-middle-class assimilated Jewish family, Lessing's political ideals and his Zionism aroused persecution by the rising Nazi state. He fled to Czechoslovakia where he lived in Marienbad in the villa of a local social democratic politician. On the night of 30 August 1933, he was assassinated by Sudeten German Nazi sympathizers.

Lessing's philosophical views were influenced by Nietzsche and Afrikan Spir. According to Theodore Ziolkowski in Lessing's Geschichte als Sinngebung des Sinnlosen (History as Giving Meaning to the Meaningless), "writing in the tradition of Nietzsche, argued that history, having no objective validity, amounts to a mythic construct imposed on an unknowable reality, in order to give it some semblance of meaning."

== Life ==
=== Early life ===
Lessing was born into an upper-middle-class assimilated Jewish family. His father was a doctor in Hanover, and his mother was the daughter of a banker. He remembered his schooldays as unhappy; he was a mediocre student and graduated from Ratsgymnasium Hannover only with great difficulty. In his memoirs he wrote:

This humanistic German gymnasium with patriotism, Latin, and Greek as the main subjects... this institute for the furtherance of the stultification of humanity, half built on ambitious striving for offices, half on mendacious, clichéd hyper-Germanness, was not just incredibly conscienceless, it was utterly boring... Nothing, nothing could ever make up for what those fifteen years destroyed in me. Even now, almost every night I dream of the tortures of my schooldays.

At the time he was friendly with Ludwig Klages, but this friendship came to an end in 1899 (although whether anti-Semitism was a factor is unclear). Each later maintained that his own adult views had been determined by this shared background.

After his graduation he began studying medicine in Freiburg im Breisgau, Bonn, and finally Munich, where, in greater conformity with his real interests, he turned to literature, philosophy, and psychology. He concluded his study of philosophy with a dissertation on the work of the Russian logician Afrikan Spir.

His plans of habilitation at the University of Dresden were stymied by opposition to him as a Jew, socialist, and open supporter of feminism. The next few years he spent as a substitute teacher and lecturer. In 1906 he travelled to Göttingen in order to obtain a habilitation under Edmund Husserl. This plan also came to nothing, but resulted briefly in a position as theatre critic for the Göttinger Zeitung; his critical notes were later collected in book form as Nachtkritiken.

=== Growing renown ===
In 1907 he returned to Hanover, where he lectured on philosophy at the Technische Hochschule, founding the first German anti-noise (noise abatement) society.

In January 1910 he created a literary scandal with a vicious satirical attack on the critic Samuel Lublinski and his Bilanz der Moderne (1904), in a piece published in Die Schaubühne filled with gibes about Lublinski's small and rotund appearance, Jewishness, and summing him up as an "escapistic windbag". The article drew strong condemnation from many writers including Thomas Mann, who had received early recognition from Lublinski for his novel Buddenbrooks, and returned the insults by calling Lessing a "disgraceful dwarf who should consider himself lucky that the sun shines on him, too."

Drawing on the medical knowledge he had acquired at university, Lessing volunteered for medical service at the outbreak of the First World War to avoid combat duty at the front. At this time he wrote his famous essay Geschichte als Sinngebung des Sinnlosen ("History as Making Sense of the Senseless"). Its publication was delayed by the censor until 1919 on account of its uncompromising anti-war position. After the war he returned to lecturing in Hanover and established the Volkshochschule Hannover-Linden with the help of his second wife, Ada Lessing.

=== Fame and anti-nationalist polemics ===
From 1923 he was highly active in public life, publishing articles and essays in Prager Tagblatt and Dortmunder Generalanzeiger, and quickly became one of the best-known political writers of Weimar Germany. In 1925 he drew attention to the fact that the serial killer Fritz Haarmann had been a spy for the Hanover police, and this resulted in him being excluded from covering the trial. In the same year he wrote an unflattering piece on Paul von Hindenburg, describing him as an intellectually vacuous man who was being used as a front by sinister political forces:

It was Plato's view that the leaders of men should be philosophers. No philosopher ascends the throne in Hindenburg. Only a representative symbol, a question mark, a zero. One might say "Better a zero than a Nero." Sadly, history shows that behind every zero lurks a future Nero.

This article earned him the enmity of nationalists, and his lectures were soon disrupted by anti-Semitic protestors. Lessing received only limited support from the public, and even his colleagues argued that he had gone too far. A six-month leave of absence failed to calm the situation. On 7 June nearly a thousand students threatened to move their studies to the Technische Universität Braunschweig unless he was removed, and on 18 June 1926 the Prussian minister Carl Heinrich Becker bowed to public pressure by putting Lessing on indefinite leave on a reduced salary.

=== Escape from the Nazis and assassination ===
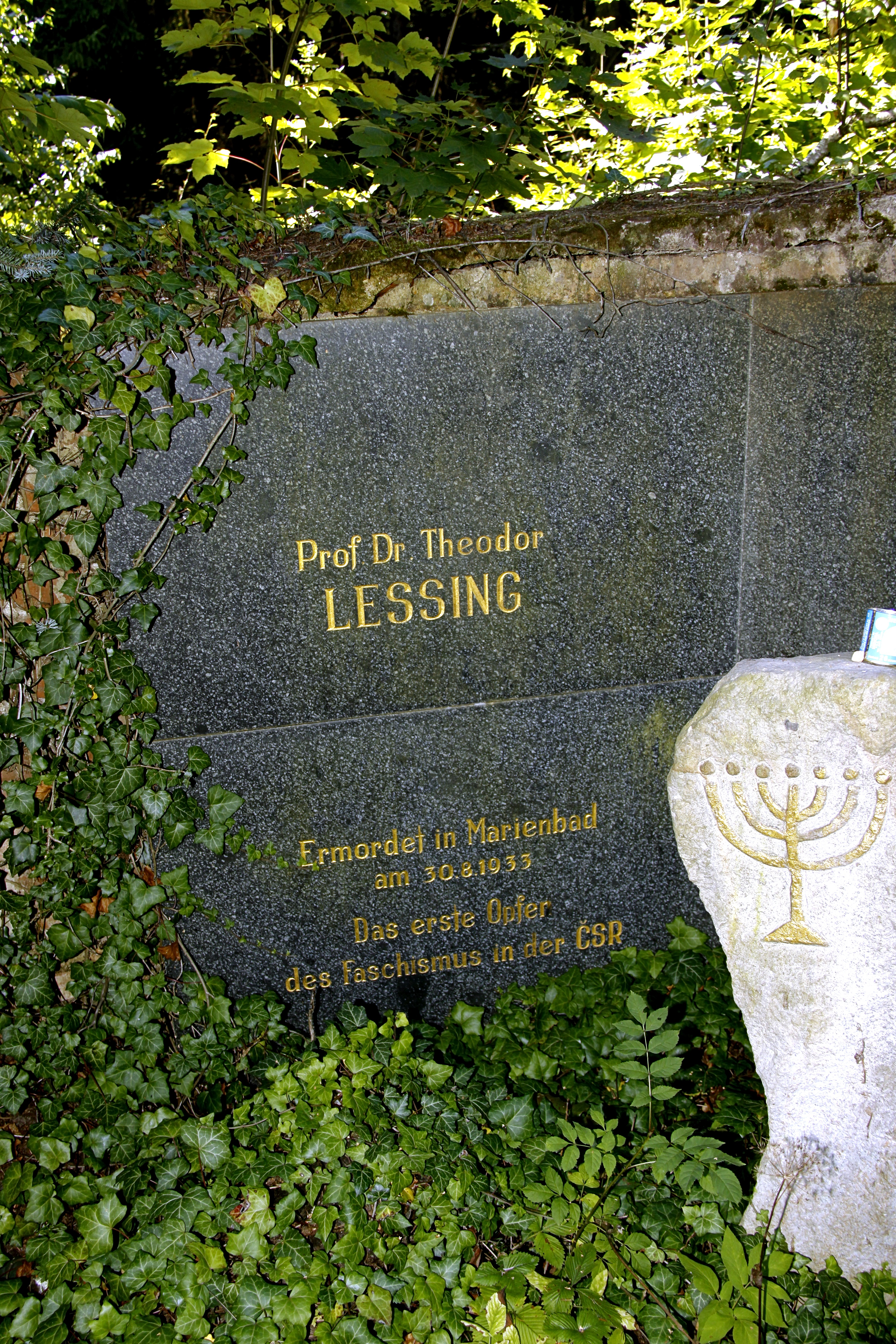
Grave of Lessing in Marienbad (Mariánské Lázně)

On 30 January 1933, the Nazi Party entered government and in February, after the suppression of the Das Freie Wort congress, Lessing prepared to leave. On 1 March he and his wife fled to Marienbad in Czechoslovakia, where he continued to write for German-language newspapers abroad. In June it was reported in Sudeten newspapers that a large reward had been offered for his kidnapping and delivery to Germany. A similar reward was offered for the assassination of Albert Einstein, who spent some weeks in England protected by armed guards.

On 30 August 1933, Lessing was working in his study on the first floor at the Villa Edelweiss (today at Třebízského 33) when he was shot through the window; he died the next day at the hospital in Marienbad and is now considered the first casualty of National Socialism on Czech soil. His assassins were German Nazis from Sudetenland, Rudolf Max Eckert, Rudolf Zischka and Karl Hönl who fled to Nazi Germany where they were given new identities by the SA.

=== Personal life ===
Lessing married Maria Margarete Adele Pauline Friederike Stach von Goltzheim in 1900; the couple had two daughters, Miriam (born 1902) and Judith (born 1904). After their marriage ended, he married Ada Lessing around 1912. With Ada, he had another daughter, Ruth (born 1913), who married the photographer Hein Gorny.

== Works (selection) ==
- African Spirs Erkenntnislehre, Gießen, Münchow, 1900
  Lessing's dissertation at Erlangen.
- Geschichte als Sinngebung des Sinnlosen. (Beck) 1919 ASIN B0000EAZ09 bzw. Leipzig: Reinicke Verlag 1927 OCLC 72170880. Neu: München: Matthes & Seitz 1983. ISBN 3-88221-219-5
- Haarmann. Die Geschichte eines Werwolfs. 1925
- Meine Tiere. 1926
- Blumen. 1928
- Der jüdische Selbsthaß. 1930
  Jewish Self-Hate, translated and annotated by Peter C. Applebaum, Introduction by Sander L. Gilman, Afterword by Paul Reitter, Edited by Benton Arnovitz. Berghahn Books 2021. ISBN 978-1-78920-992-1
- Einmal und nie wieder. Erinnerungen, aus dem Nachlass herausgegeben 1935
- Die verfluchte Kultur. Matthes & Seitz 1981. ISBN 3-88221-325-6
- Jörg Wollenberg (Hrsg.): Theodor Lessing – Ausgewählte Schriften. Donat Verlag Bremen
  - Band 1: Theodor Lessing: 'Bildung ist Schönheit' – Autobiographische Zeugnisse und Schriften zur Bildungsreform. Bremen 1995
  - Band 2: Theodor Lessing: 'Wir machen nicht mit!' – Schriften gegen den Nationalismus und zur Judenfrage. Bremen 1997
  - Band 3: Theodor Lessing: 'Theaterseele' und 'Tomi melkt die Moralkuh' – Schriften zu Theater und Literatur. Bremen 2003
- "Geschichte als Sinngebung des Sinnlosen". Zum Leben und Werk des Kulturkritikers Theodor Lessing (1872-1933), hrsg. von Elke-Vera Kotowski, Hildesheim 2006
