= Schloss Meseberg =

Baroque palace in Brandenburg, Oberhavel, Germany

Coordinates: 52°58′21″N 13°06′04″E

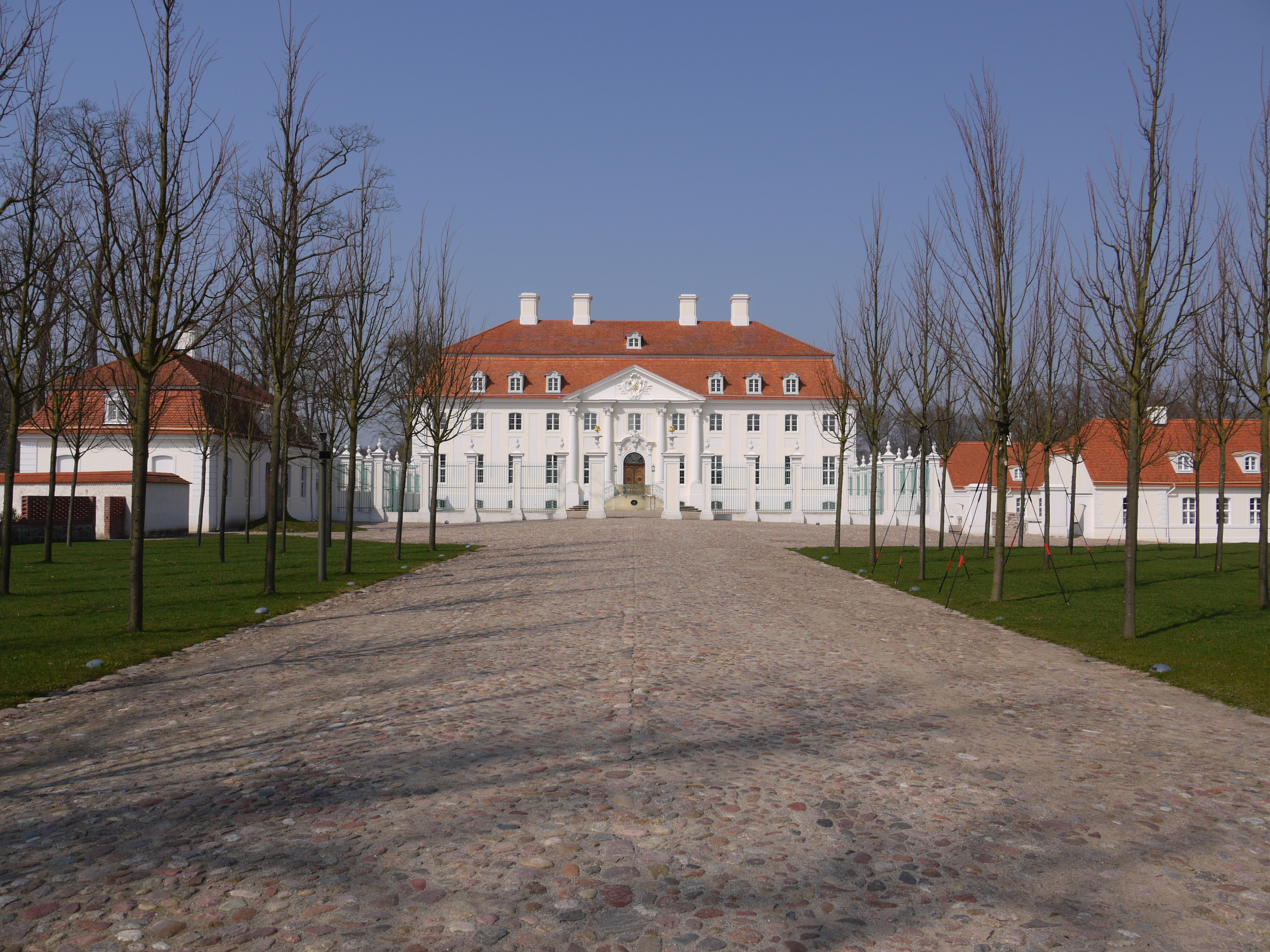
Schloss Meseberg

Schloss Meseberg is a Baroque palace in the north of Brandenburg, in Oberhavel, Germany which is the retreat of the Chancellor of Germany and the official state guest house of the German Federal Government. It is situated in an estate near the town of Gransee southeast of the Huwenowsee lake.

On 12 February 2026, the Merz cabinet informed the owner of the castle, the Messerschmitt Foundation, of the decision not to use the castle any longer starting February 2027. The property had been rented for a symbolic sum of one euro. According to a government spokesperson, the costs of operation and maintenance are no longer proportionate.

== History ==
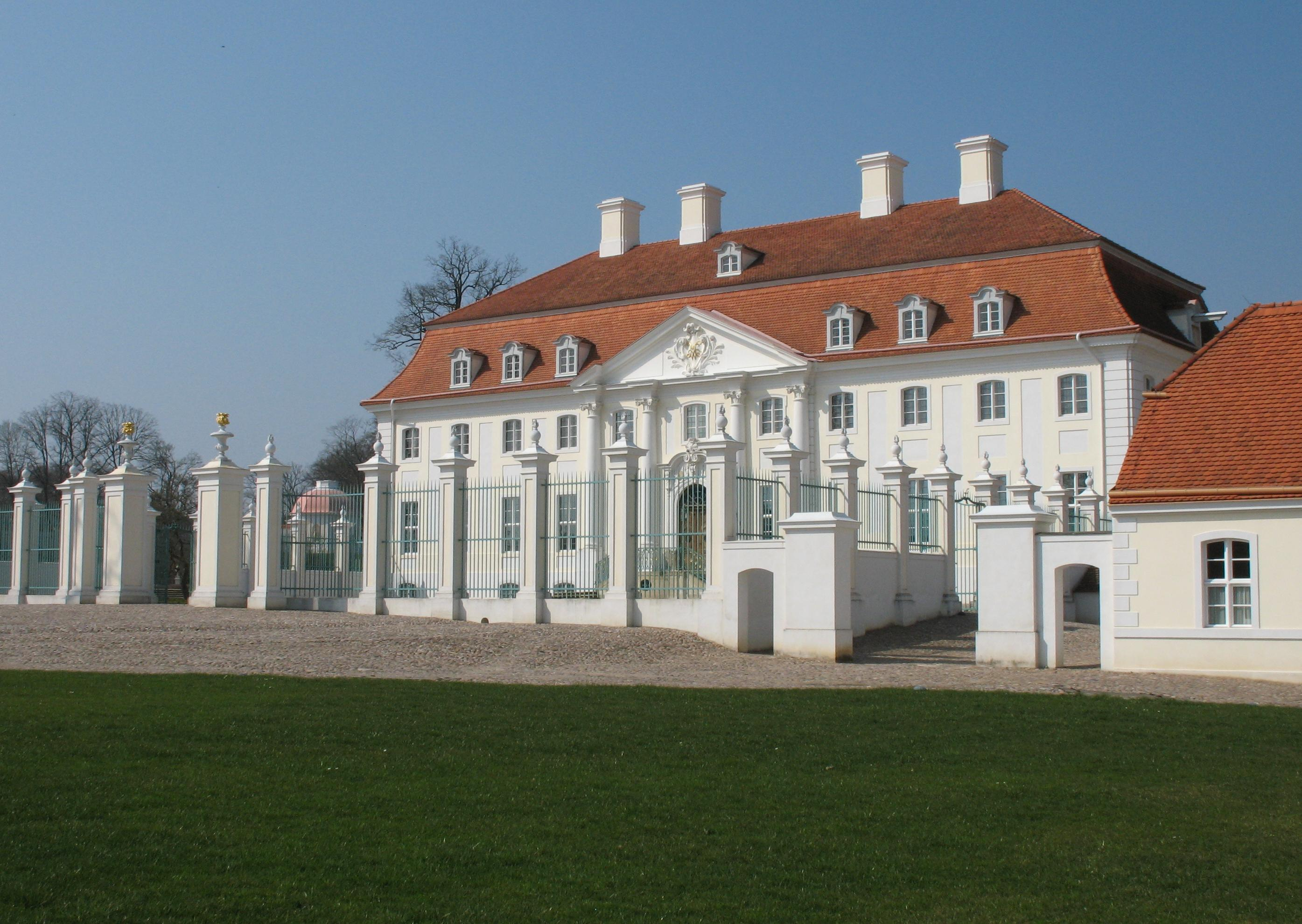
Schloss Meseberg

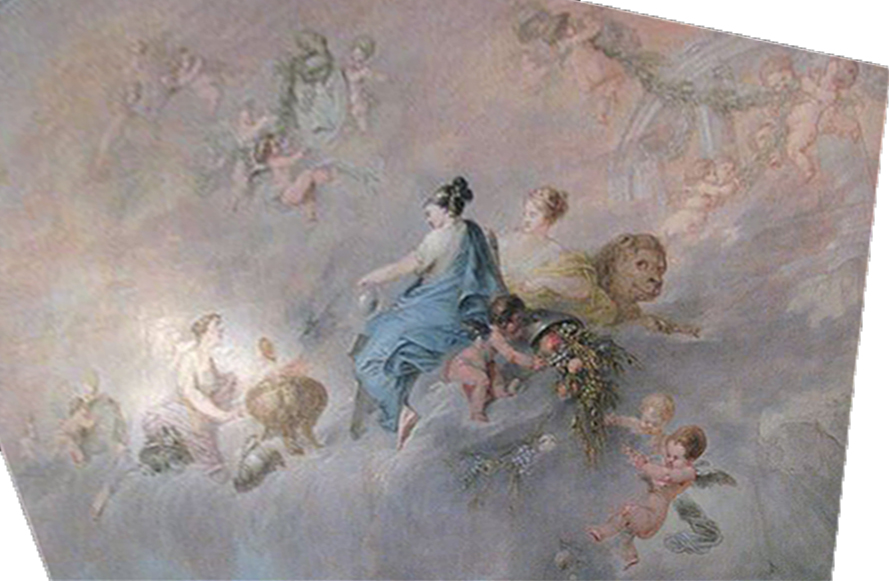
Ceiling fresco by Bernhard Rode

Built by the Wartensleben family in 1739 to replace a previous building on the site that had burnt down, the Schloss passed to the von der Gröben family in the second half of the century. In 1774, the property and adjacent land parcels including three neighboring estates were purchased by Prince Henry of Prussia, who resided in nearby Rheinsberg Palace, and one year later were gifted to his paramour, Christian Ludwig von Kaphengst (1740-1800). In this way Heinrich complied with the command of his brother, King Frederick II, to remove Kaphengst from the court at Rheinsberg. Kaphengst furnished and decorated the palace lavishly, commissioning ceiling frescoes from Bernhard Rode, including one depicting an apotheosis of Heinrich. The estate grew with the construction of additional buildings, including the stables. Under Kaphengst and his successors, the Baroque garden was extended, and an English garden edging most of the lake shore was landscaped by Peter Joseph Lenné.

The property was later purchased by the Lessing family, owners of the Berlin newspaper Vossische Zeitung. During the Nazi era, it was forcibly acquired by Hermann Göring, only to be appropriated by the Soviet occupation in 1945. The East German government used it to house a grocery store and school rooms, which preserved it from demolition. A plan to renovate the dilapidated palace and turn it into a conference center for the Academy of Sciences was never realized.

Following the reunification of Germany the estate was bought by the Messerschmitt Foundation in 1995. The foundation, devoted to preserving historical landmarks, spent 11 years and more than $30 million renovating the stucco building, with its Ionic half-columns and high mansard roof.

In 2004, the Messerschmitt Foundation agreed to lease the palace to the Federal German Government for 20 years – from 2007 to 2027 –, for a symbolic annual rent of one euro. The government subsequently spent $17 million to install security and communications equipment and period furniture and paintings. Since 2007, it has been the retreat of the Chancellor of Germany (as Chequers is for the Prime Minister of the United Kingdom and Camp David for the President of the United States). The government regularly holds its cabinet retreat at Meseberg.

Chancellors Angela Merkel and Olaf Scholz hosted many state guests at Meseberg. In their so-called Meseberg Declaration of 2018, Merkel and President Emmanuel Macron of France publicly committed themselves in 2018 to a partnership aimed at reinvigorating European integration. From 2015 to 2018, however, the venue was used only eight days a year on average, including two annual public events (an open house and a Christmas tree lighting ceremony). Since taking office in 2025, Chancellor Friedrich Merz has been favouring Villa Borsig as venue for hosting cabinet retreats and receiving foreign dignitaries.

== Facilities ==
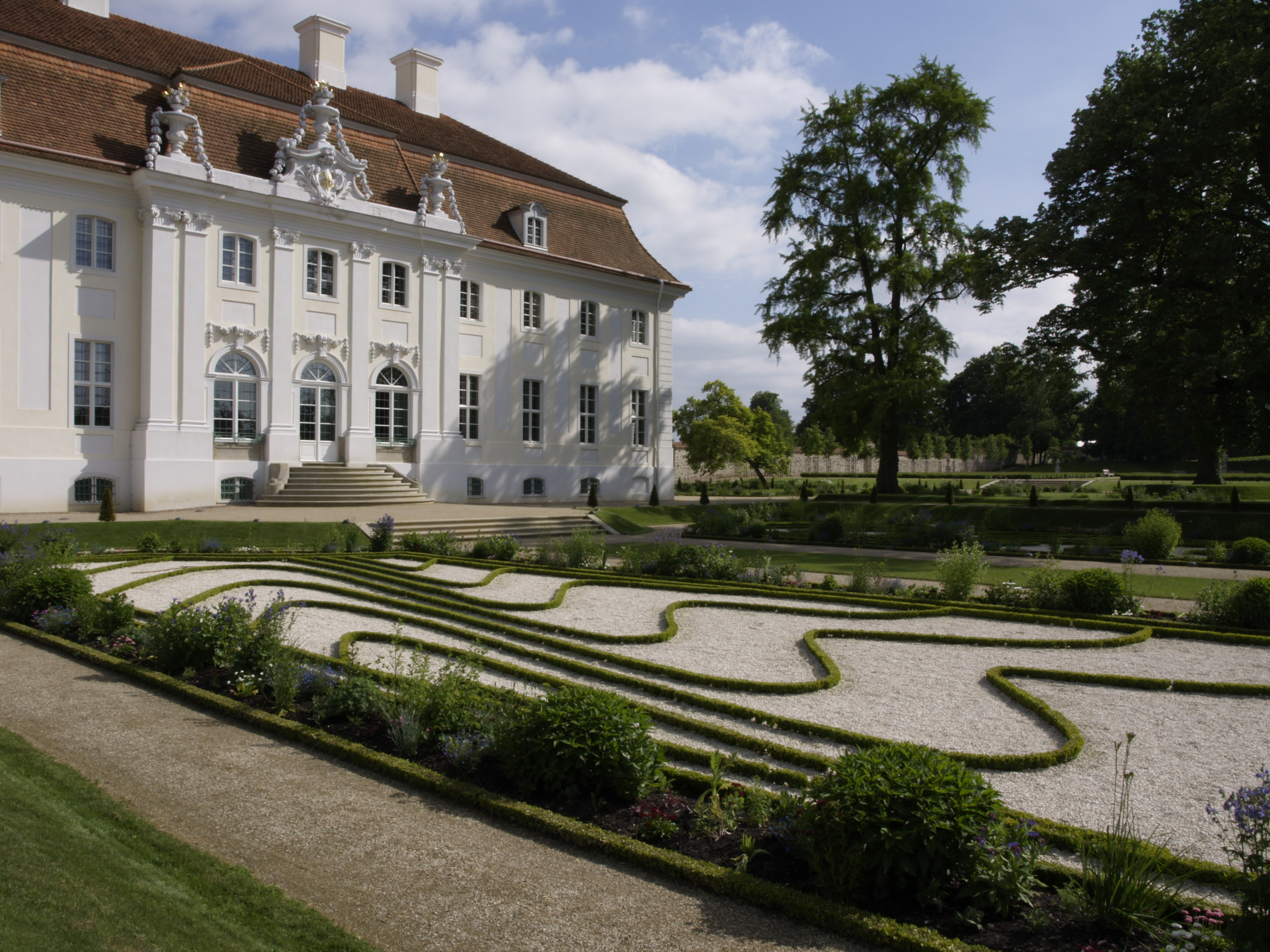
Park of Schloss Meseberg

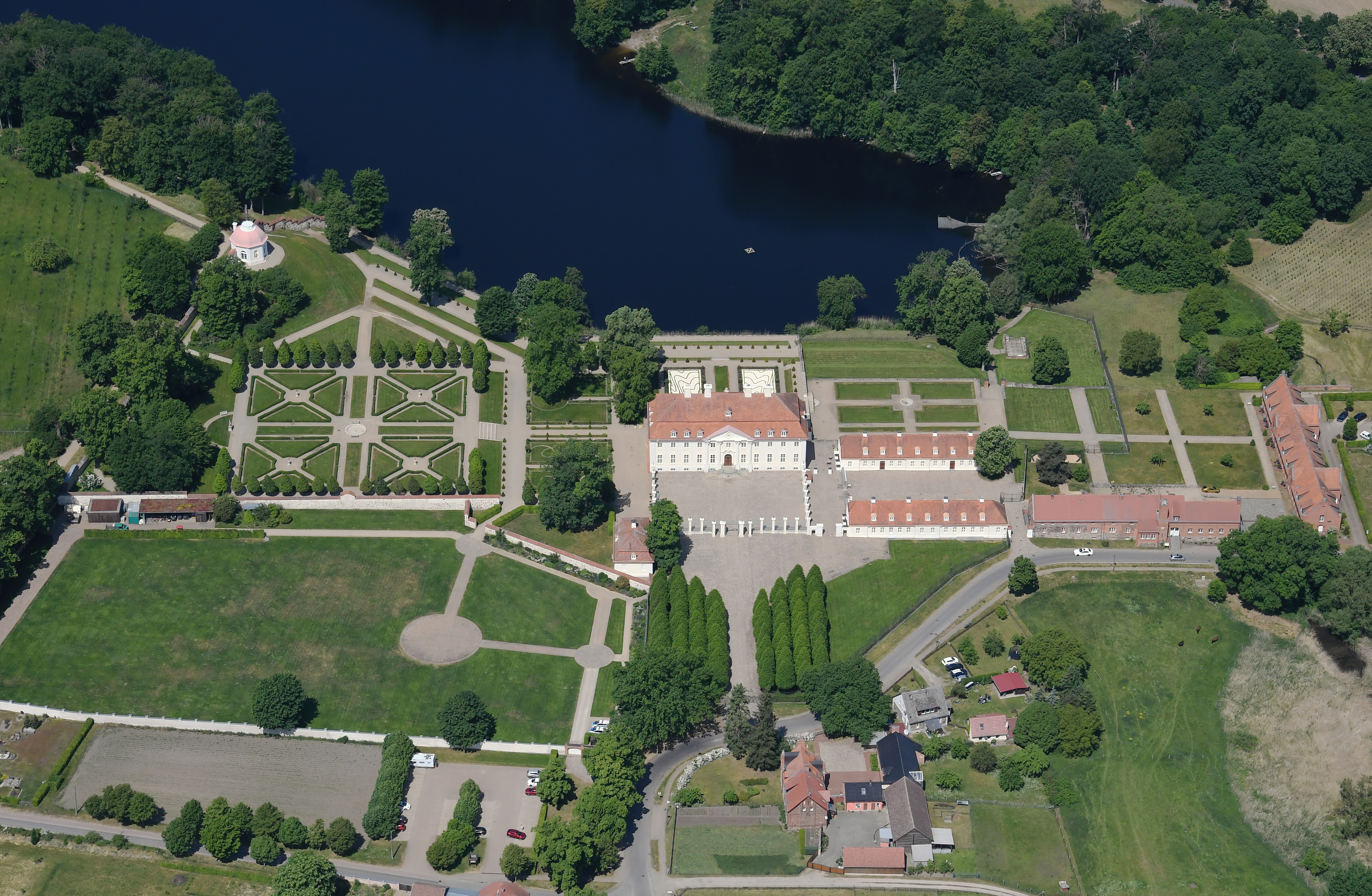
Aerial view of the palace and park

The palace basement once housed the kitchen of the local agricultural cooperative. Today it houses the chancellor's wine bar, with seats for 30 guests.

== Visits of foreign dignitaries (selection) ==
=== First term of Chancellor Angela Merkel ===
- 23 February 2007 – Visit of Jacques Chirac and Philippe Douste-Blazy of France
- 20 April 2007 – Dinner with Václav Klaus of the Czech Republic (alongside former President Roman Herzog of Germany)
- 23 April 2007 – Visit of José Manuel Durão Barroso of Portugal (in his capacity as President of the European Commission)
- 17 May 2007 – Dinner with Lech Kaczyński of Poland
- 15 June 2007 – Meeting with Jan Peter Balkenende of the Netherlands
- 17 June 2007 – Lunch with Mirek Topolánek of the Czech Republic
- 10 September 2007 – Visit of Nicolas Sarkozy and Bernard Kouchner of France
- 20 November 2007 – Visit of Romano Prodi of Italy
- 10 June 2008 – Visit of George W. Bush and Laura Bush of the United States
- 11 February 2008 – Dinner with Ehud Olmert of Israel

=== Second term of Chancellor Angela Merkel ===
- 25 November 2009 – Meeting with José Luis Rodríguez Zapatero of Spain
- 4–5 June 2010 – Visit of Dmitry Medvedev of Russia
- 5 October 2010 – Dinner with Wen Jiabao of China
- 25 January 2011 – Dinner with José Manuel Durão Barroso of Portugal (in his capacity as President of the European Commission)
- 30 November 2011 – Dinner with Jens Stoltenberg of Norway
- 19 January 2012 – Dinner with Pedro Passos Coelho of Portugal, Fredrik Reinfeldt of Sweden and Werner Faymann of Austria
- 13 February 2012 – Dinner with Helle Thorning-Schmidt of Denmark, Andrus Ansip of Estonia and Mark Rutte of the Netherlands
- 23 February 2012 – Dinner with Enda Kenny of Ireland, Petr Nečas of the Czech Republic and Valdis Dombrovskis of Latvia
- 12–13 April 2013 – Visit of David Cameron and Samantha Cameron of the United Kingdom
- 26 May 2013 – Dinner with Li Keqiang of China

=== Third term of Chancellor Angela Merkel ===
- 31 August 2015 – Visit of Mariano Rajoy of Spain
- 4 May 2016 – Visit of Shinzō Abe and Akie Abe of Japan
- 9 May 2016 – Visit of Mohammed bin Zayed Al Nahyan and Abdullah bin Zayed Al Nahyan of the United Arab Emirates
- 11 July 2016 – Reception for the Diplomatic Corps with Apostolic Nuncio Nikola Eterović
- 12 July 2016 – Meeting with Jarosław Kaczyński, Adam Bielan and Zdzisław Krasnodębski of Poland
- 18 August 2016 – Visit of Donald Tusk of Poland (in his capacity as President of the European Council)
- 26 August 2016 – Dinner with Stefan Löfven of Sweden, Lars Løkke Rasmussen of Denmark, Mark Rutte of the Netherlands and Juha Sipilä of Finland
- 27 August 2016 – Meeting with Boyko Borissov of Bulgaria, Miro Cerar of Slovenia, Christian Kern of Austria and Tihomir Orešković of Croatia
- 20 May 2017 – Visit of Petro Poroshenko of Ukraine
- 25 May 2016 – Cabinet retreat with Taavi Rõivas of Estonia
- 30 May 2017 – Visit of Narendra Modi of India
- 13 July 2017 – Reception for the Diplomatic Corps with Apostolic Nuncio Nikola Eterović

=== Fourth term of Chancellor Angela Merkel ===
- 10 April 2018 – Cabinet retreat with Jean-Claude Juncker of Luxembourg (in his capacity as President of the European Commission) and Jens Stoltenberg of Norway (in his capacity as Secretary General of NATO)
- 19 June 2018 – Franco-German Ministerial Council with Emmanuel Macron of France and Jean-Claude Juncker of Luxembourg (in his capacity as President of the European Commission)
- 6 July 2018 – Reception for the Diplomatic Corps with Apostolic Nuncio Nikola Eterović
- 15 August 2018 – Dinner with Mahamadou Issoufou of Niger
- 18 August 2018 – Visit of Vladimir Putin of Russia
- 29 June 2020 – Visit of Emmanuel Macron of France
- 13 July 2020 – Visit of Giuseppe Conte of Italy
- 10 November 2021 – Dinner with António Costa of Portugal and Krišjānis Kariņš of Latvia

=== Chancellor Olaf Scholz ===
- 3 May 2022 – Cabinet retreat with Magdalena Andersson of Sweden and Sanna Marin of Finland
- 30 August 2022 – Cabinet retreat with Pedro Sánchez of Spain
- 6–7 March 2023 – Cabinet retreat with Ursula von der Leyen of Germany (in her capacity as President of the European Commission)
- 28 May 2024 – Franco-German Ministerial Council with Emmanuel Macron of France
- 23 October 2024 – Visit of Tamim bin Hamad Al Thani of Qatar

== See also ==
- List of Baroque residences
