= Virginia Lesser =

American biostatistician and environmental statistician

Virginia Marie Lesser is an American biostatistician and environmental statistician known for her research on non-sampling error, survey methodology, and agricultural applications of statistics. She is a professor of statistics and chair of the statistics department at Oregon State University.

== Education and career ==
Lesser completed her Ph.D. in biostatistics in 1992 at the University of North Carolina at Chapel Hill. Her dissertation, A Comparison of Periodic Survey Designs Employing Multi-Stage Sampling, was supervised by William D. Kalsbeek.

At Oregon State, she has been Director of the Survey Research Center since 1993. She became the first woman promoted to full professor in statistics at Oregon State, in 2009.

== Recognition ==
Lesser became a Fellow of the American Statistical Association in 2010. She is also an elected member of the International Statistical Institute.
