= Friedrich Christian Lesser =

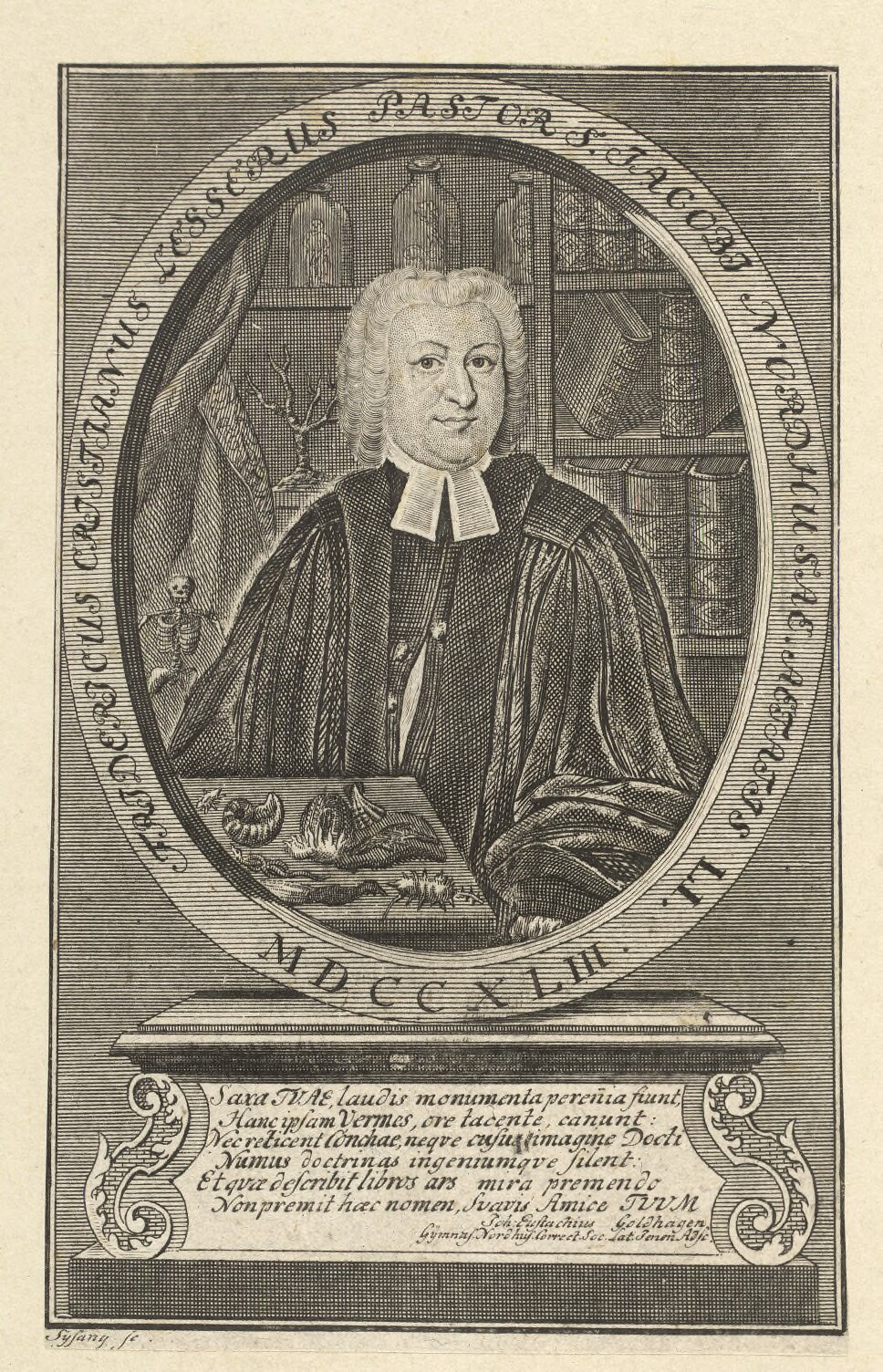
Portrait engraving with an inscription by Johann Eustachius Goldhagen

Friedrich Christian Lesser (12 May 1692 – 17 September 1754) was a German Protestant pastor, naturalist and antiquarian who promoted natural theology through the study of insects, minerals, and plants which he formulated in his books Insecto-theologia (1738), Testaceo-theologia (1744) and Litho-theologie (1735). He lived in Nordhausen and also wrote a history of the city.

== Life and work ==
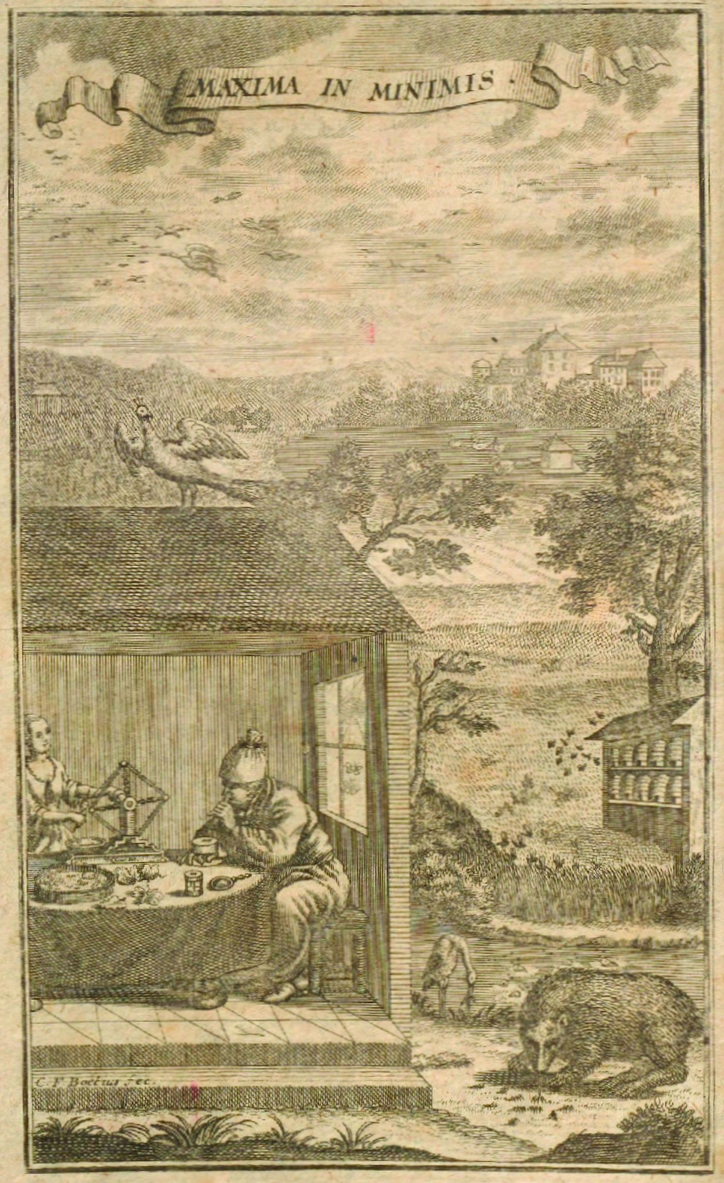
Frontispiece of Insecto-theologica with the motto Maxima in Minimis

Lesser was the son of a Protestant priest Philipp Jacob Lesser (1656–1724) in St. Nicolai, Nordhausen. His mother Emilia Sophia née Rothmaler was also from a family of clergy, the daughter of Johann Elias Rothmaler who was a court preacher in Rudolstadt Fortress and an archdeacon in the city of Rudolstadt. He was taught at home and at the Nordhäusen Gymnasium after which he went to Halle to study medicine. Here he was influenced by August Hermann Francke, a friend of his father, and he shifted to theology. He studied at Halle and Leipzig but had to return home following a terrible fire in September 1712 at Nordhausen that destroyed his home. He returned home from studies in 1715 to become a private tutor to the children of Karl Heinrich von Grossen at Kinderode and later Großwerther. In 1716 he went to the pastorate of Frauenberg. He married Johanna Maria the daughter of merchant Adam Wolfram in 1717 and they had four children but she died in 1729. In 1741 he became parish priest at Jacobi Church. Lesser took an interest in natural theology and in his book Insecto-theologia examined how a study of insects celebrated the wisdom of the Creator. In a similar vein, he also looked at rocks and minerals for signs of God. The book on insect theology was translated into French in 1742, Italian in 1751, and went into several German editions. Lesser was aware of the work of Jan Swammerdam on bees and of other scientific advances of the period. Lesser wrote that "The vilest insect is the work of omnipotence, worthy of the highest admiration. It is endowed with so many perfections, that the most powerful monarch, or the most skillful artists, can produce nothing to be compared with it. God alone can work those wonders, and he presents them to us, not as models for our imitation, but as so many testimonies of its power and wisdom." He sought to demonstrate the art and skills of God and supported the contemporary ideas of the 'chain of being' and of 'spontaneous generation', that insects were generated from decaying matter.

Lesser was elected to the Leopoldina Academy on December 8, 1735, under the name of Aristomachus.
