= Kathryn Posin =

American choreographer

Kathryn Posin (born March 23, 1943) is an American choreographer known for her musical and sculptural fusing of ballet and modern dance genres. In addition to choreographing, she has also taught technique and composition at several American universities. Her most recent season with The Kathryn Posin Dance Company commissioned by 92nd Street Y in February 2016 received an award from the Lower Manhattan Cultural Council and an Arts Works Grant from the NEA in 2017.

== Biography ==
Born in Butte, Montana. Posin went to the University of Chicago Laboratory High School and received her BA in Dance at Bennington College (1965) and her MA in Interdisciplinary and World Dance at New York University's Gallatin School of Individualized Study (2004). She studied composition with Louis Horst, Anna Sokolow, Merce Cunningham and Hanya Holm. She has made ballets for Netherlands Dance Theater 1 and 2 (1980), the Alvin Ailey American Dance Theater and Ailey 2 (1981 & 82), five ballets for the Milwaukee Ballet from 1991-2016, On a Fulbright Fellowship she staged her Stepping Stones and Scheherazade for the Bulgarian National Ballet. She was the first international choreographer to make a work for Cloud Gate Dance Theater of Taiwan, in 1981. In 2000 she created the Joffrey/New School BFA and was named founding chair.

== Awards ==
The Kathryn Posin Dance Company founded 1973, has received a Guggenheim Fellowship 1979, a Jerome Robbins Award 1969, The Doris Humphrey Fellowship 1979, and a Bennington College Choreographer's Grant 1981 .The company was also awarded 14 NEA Fellowships and Company Grants from 1974 to 1987, Kathryn was awarded two Jewish Studies Grants from the Gallatin School of New York University in 2010 & 2011.

In theater Posin has choreographed the hit rock musical, Salvation (1975) and The Cherry Orchard directed by Andrei Șerban at Lincoln Center (2002), The Boys from Syracuse at American Repertory Theater (2002).

== Personal life ==
Posin is currently Professor of World Dance and Choreography at the Gallatin School at NYU. The next scheduled performance of the Kathryn Posin Dance company will be in 2018 at New York Live Arts.

== Choreography and staging credits ==
- Scheherazade revival (third time) 2016 for The Milwaukee Ballet
- The Kathryn Posin Dance Company 2016 Meredith Monk and Waves at 92Y
- Voices of Bulgaria and America 2014 at the 92Y at 92Y
- Scheherazade 2014 National Ballet of Bulgaria in Doha, Qatar Opera House
- Fly, Fly My Sadness 2013 for UN and Bulgarian Consulate and board members
- Scheherazade 2012 Fulbright Fellowship, National Ballet of Bulgaria at New Bulgarian University
- Minotaur and its Labyrinth 2012 Filming at the Palace of the Minotaur on Crete
- Two Dylan Songs 2011 Jewish Studies Grant commission Gallatin School of NYU
- Stepping Stones 2011 National Ballet of Bulgaria, with Sara-Nora Krysteva, Artistic Director
- New Work for Students 2010 Syracuse University, Summer Dance
- Time 2 Tango 2010 Eglevsky Ballet of Long Island, Marina Eglevsky, Artistic Director
- You Are Variations 2010 The Yard, Martha's Vineyard, Wendy Tauscher Artistic Director
- You Are Variations 2010 Gallatin School of NYU, Jewish Studies Grant commissioned
- Time 2 Tango 2009 Boston Conservatory commissioned, Artistic Director: Yasuko Tokunaga
- Time to Tango Excerpts 2009 Rocky Mountain Ballet Theater, Artistic Director: Charlene Campbell
- Bach's Lunch 2008 Ballet ensemble of Fairfax, Virginia, Artistic Director: Benn and Debra Savage
- Bulgarian Wedding 2007 Ballet Grandiva, Artistic Director: Victor Trevino, tour of Japan
- Scheherazade 2006 Sacramento, Ron Cunningham, Artistic Director
- Scheherazade 2006 Nevada Ballet Theater, Bruce Steivel Artistic Director
- Four World Songs 2006 Utah Regional Ballet, Artistic Director: Jackie College
- Scheherazade 2004 The Milwaukee Ballet, The Nevada Ballet, The Sacramento Ballet
- Scheherazade 2004 The Louisville Ballet, Bruce Simpson, Artistic Director
- Stepping Stones 2003 Kansas City Ballet, Artistic Director: William Whitener
- Waves 2002 Repertory Dance Theater of Salt Lake City Utah
- Thou Shalt Dwell with Me 2002 Ballet Builders, New York City
- Scheherazade 2002 Milwaukee Ballet, Director: Michael Pink
- The Seasons 2002 Central Pennsylvania Youth Ballet, Director: Marcia Dale Weary
- Stepping Stones 2001 Kansas City Ballet, Director: William Whitener
- John Adams Violin Concerto 2000 The Sacramento Ballet, Director: Ron Cunningham
- Stepping Stones 2000 Kansas City Ballet, Director: William Whitener
- Bridge of Song 1999 Milwaukee Ballet, Director: Simon Dow
- Tehillim 1999 Milwaukee Ballet, Director: Simon Dow
- Crossroads and Stepping Stones 1998 The Hartford Ballet, Director: Enid Lynn & Peggy Lyman
- John Adams Violin Concerto 1997 Ballet Builders, New York City
- Bach's Lunch 1996 Milwaukee Ballet, Director: Basil Thompson
- Four World Songs 1996 The Sarasota Ballet, Director: Robert De Warren
- Stepping Stones 1995 Ballet Met, Columbus, Ohio, Director: David Nixon
- Stepping Stones 1995 Milwaukee Ballet, Director: Basil Thompson
- The Rainforest 1994 Alvin Ailey Repertory Ensemble, New York City, Director: Sylvia Waters
- Reconstruction of Waves 1994 University of Massachusetts, Director: Andrea Watkins
- The Rainforest 1994 City College of New York Dance Department, Director: Dawn Horwitz
- Stepping Stones 1993 Milwaukee Ballet, Milwaukee, Director: Dane La Fontsee
- Repercussions 1991 Cloudgate Dance Theater, Taipei, Taiwan, Director: Lin Hwi Min
- Of Rage and Remembrance 1990 Milwaukee Ballet, Director: Dane La Fontsee
- Hunger and Thirst 1990 Alvin Ailey Repertory Ensemble, Director: Sylvia Waters
- Harmony of Leaves 1989 Trinity College, Hartford, Connecticut
- Shock Crossing 1988 University of California, Los Angeles
- Hurts Too Much To Stop 1987 Royce Hall, University of California, Los Angeles
- Waves 1986 Alvin Ailey American Dance Theater, Director: Alvin Ailey
- Later That Day 1981 Alvin Ailey American Dance Theater, NYC commissioned Director: Alvin Ailey
- Brandenburg 1981 Ballet West, Salt Lake City, Utah, Director: Bruce Marks
- Ich Ruf Zu Dir and Waves 1980 Netherlands Dance Theater, The Hague, Director: Jiri Kylian
- Waves 1979 Eliot Feld Ballet, New York City, Director: Eliot Feld
- The Closer She Gets The Better She Looks 1979 Juilliard Dance Ensemble, Director: Martha Hill
- Waves 1975 American Dance Festival, Connecticut College, Director: Charles Reinhart
