= Compound Interest (website) =

Website with infographics about chemicals

- Available in: English
- Creator: Andy Brunning
- Website: www.compoundchem.com
- Launched: December 2013; 12 years ago

Compound Interest is a website launched in 2013 by Andy Brunning with infographics on everyday chemistry. The infographics describe, for example, how chemicals found in food and nature give them smell, taste, and color. The website has a monthly collaboration with the American Chemical Society. Content of the website is used as information source by various newspapers and media, including the Washington Post, Time, The Conversation, and Forbes.
