= List of castles in Berlin and Brandenburg =

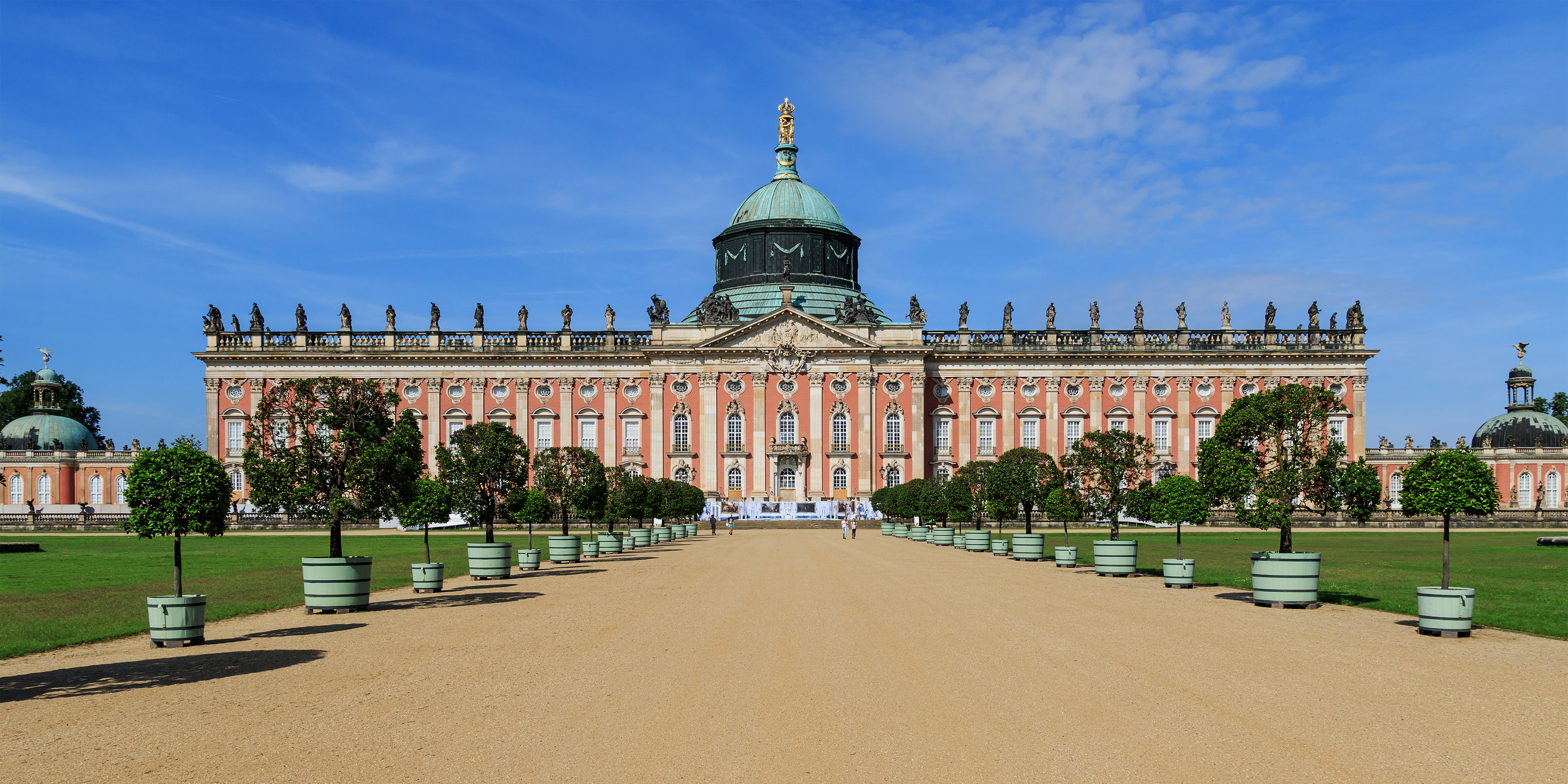
The New Palace in Sanssouci Park (Potsdam)

Numerous castles are found in the German states of Berlin and Brandenburg. These buildings, some of which have a history of over 1000 years, were the setting of historical events, domains of famous personalities and are still imposing buildings to this day.

This list encompasses castles described in German as Castle (castle), Festung (fort/fortress), Palace (manor house) and Palace/Palast (palace). Many German castles after the Middle Ages were mainly built as royal or ducal palaces rather than as a fortified building.

== Berlin ==
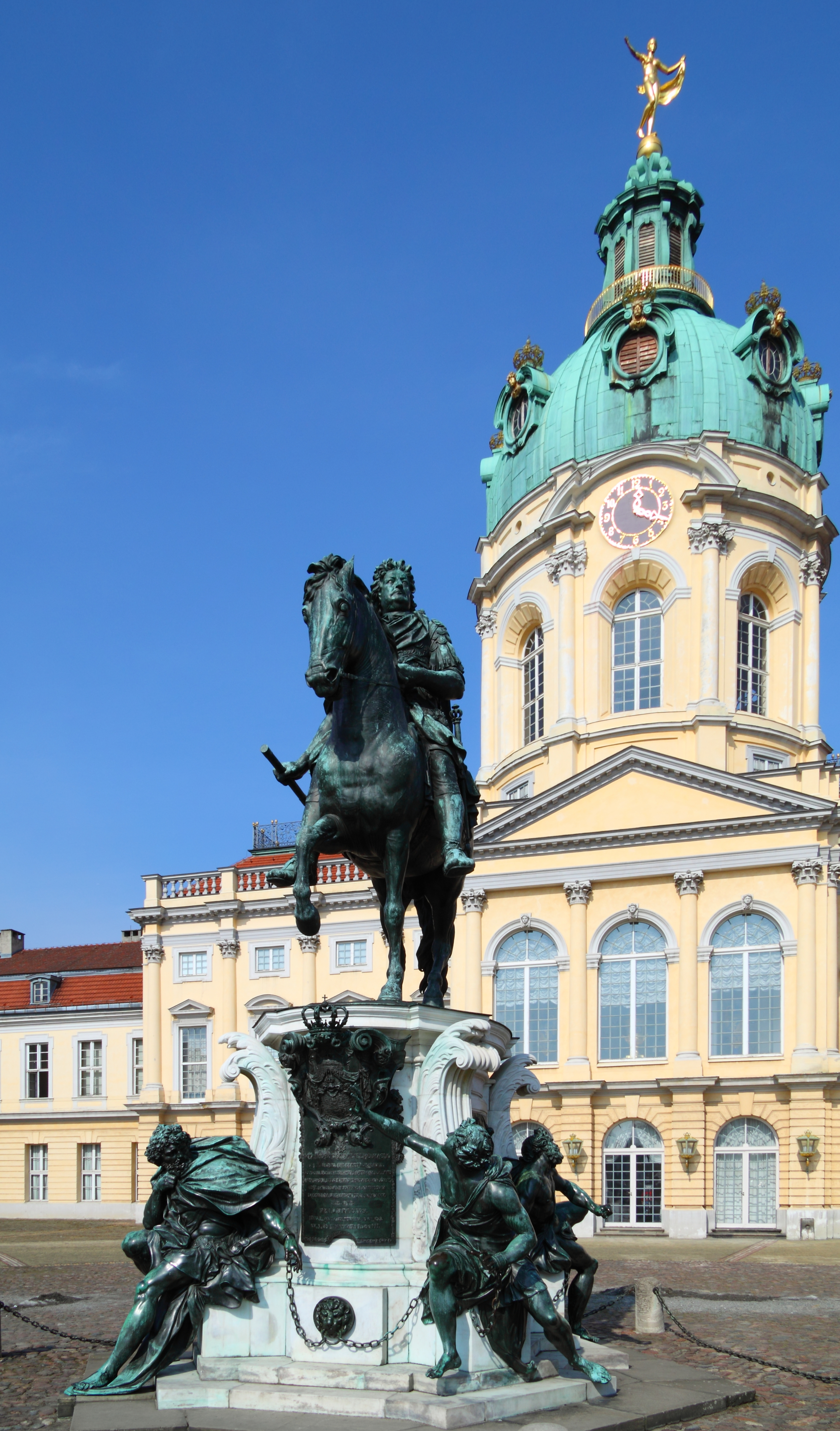
Statue Friedrich Wilhelm I (der Große Kurfürst) elector of Brandenburg at Charlottenburg Palace.

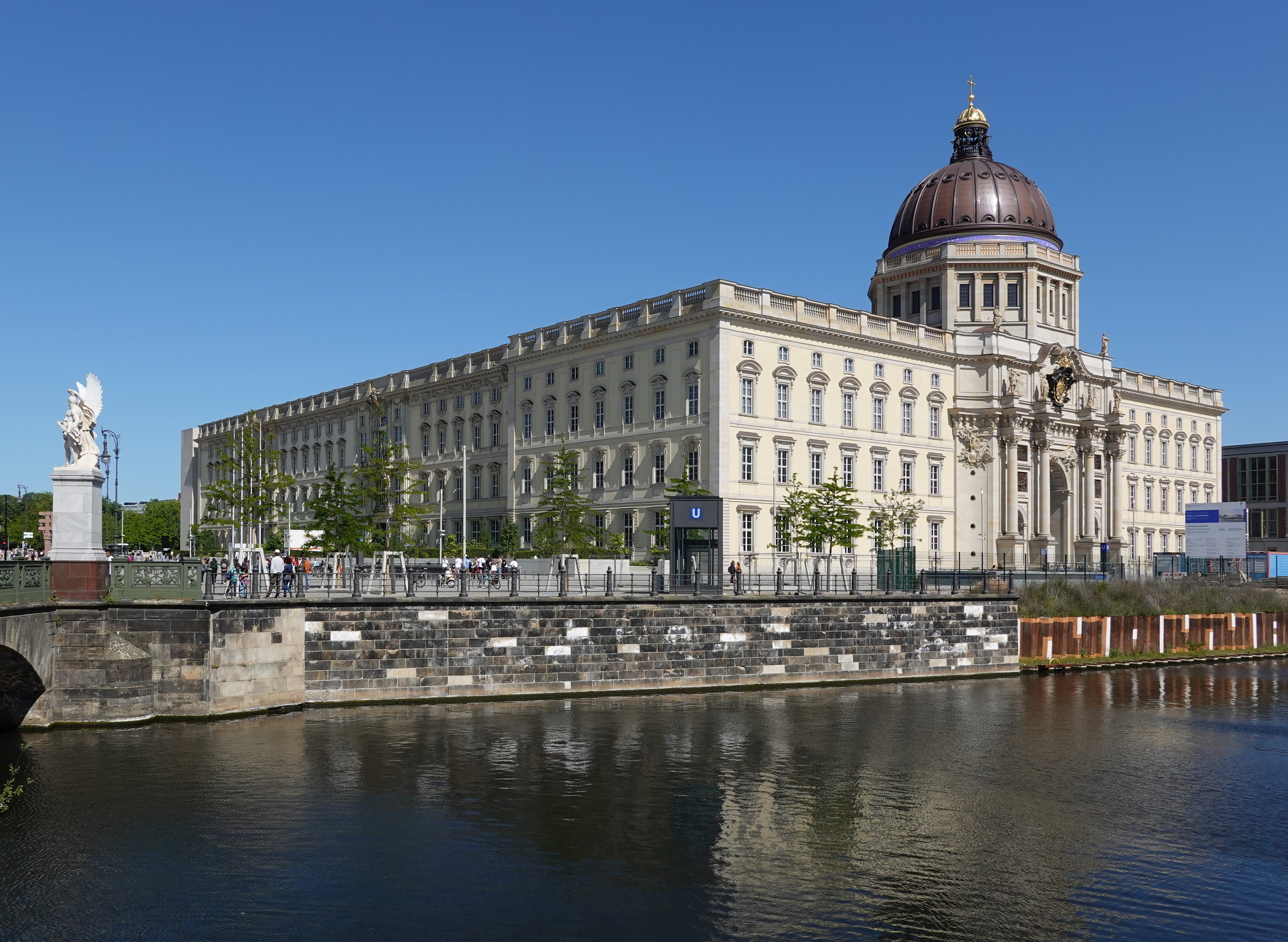
Stadtschloss / Berlin Palace

1. Charlottenburg Palace, Charlottenburg
2. Bellevue Palace, Tiergarten
3. Stadtschloss (Berlin Palace), Mitte
4. Schönhausen Palace, Pankow
5. Palace auf der Pfaueninsel, Wannsee
6. Biesdorf Palace, Biesdorf
7. Britz House, Britz
8. Jagdschloss Grunewald, Grunewald
9. Palacehotel Grunewald, Grunewald
10. Glienicke Hunting Lodge, Wannsee
11. Glienicke Palace, Wannsee
12. Crown Prince's Palace, Mitte
13. Palace of Prince Henry, today Humboldt University, Mitte
14. Donner Palace, today Palace am Festungsgraben, Mitte
15. Mendelssohn Palace, Grunewald
16. Princesses' Palace, Mitte
17. Tegel Palace, Tegel
18. Köpenick Palace, Köpenick
19. Friedrichsfelde Palace, Friedrichsfelde
20. Monbijou Palace (destroyed), Mitte
21. Gutshaus Steglitz ("Wrangelschlösschen"), Steglitz
22. Spandau Citadel, Haselhorst
23. Palais am Festungsgraben
24. Fort Hahneberg, Staaken

== Brandenburg ==
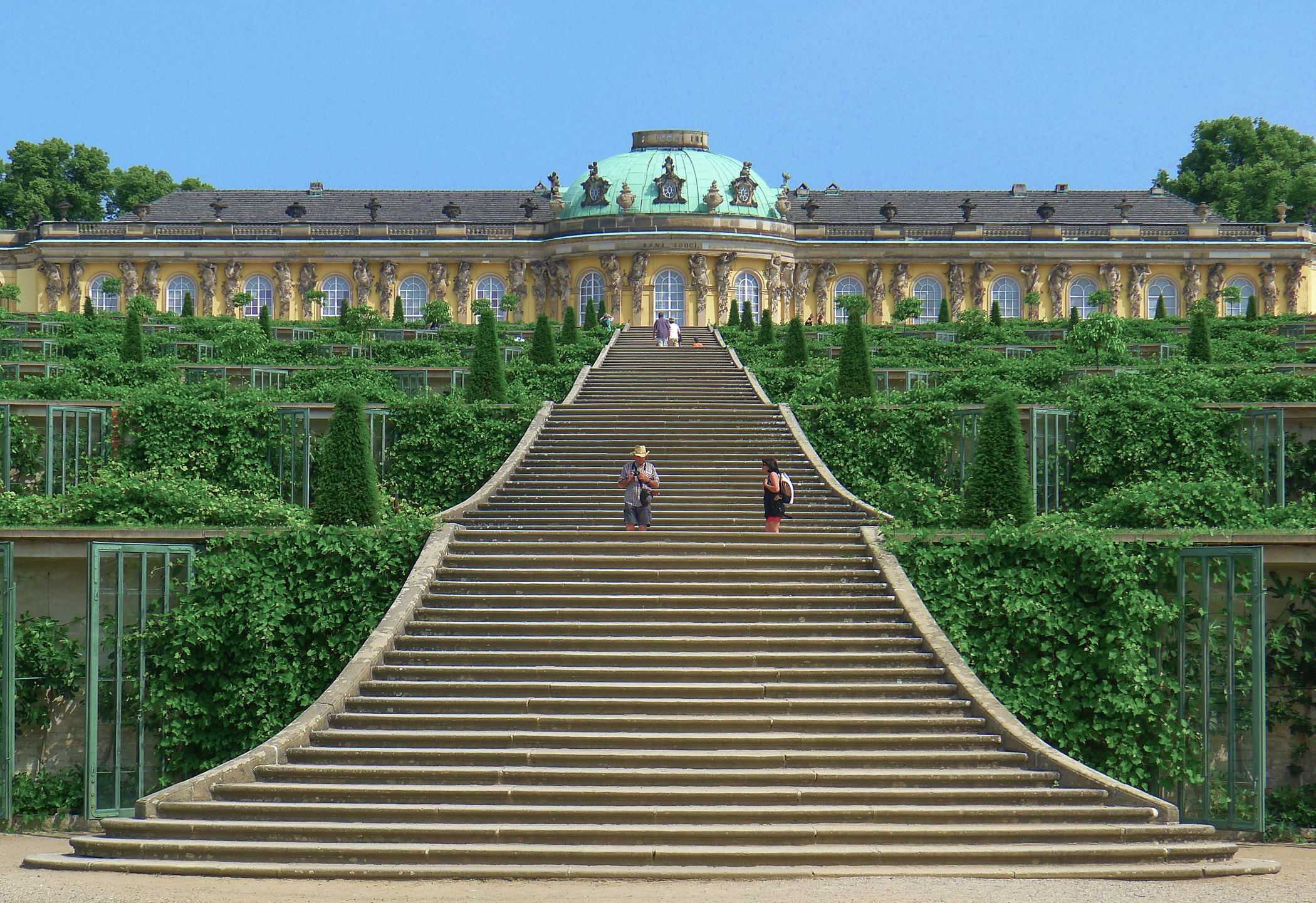
Sanssouci Palace

=== Brandenburg an der Havel ===
1. Plaue an der Havel Palace

=== Cottbus ===
1. Branitz Palace

=== Potsdam ===
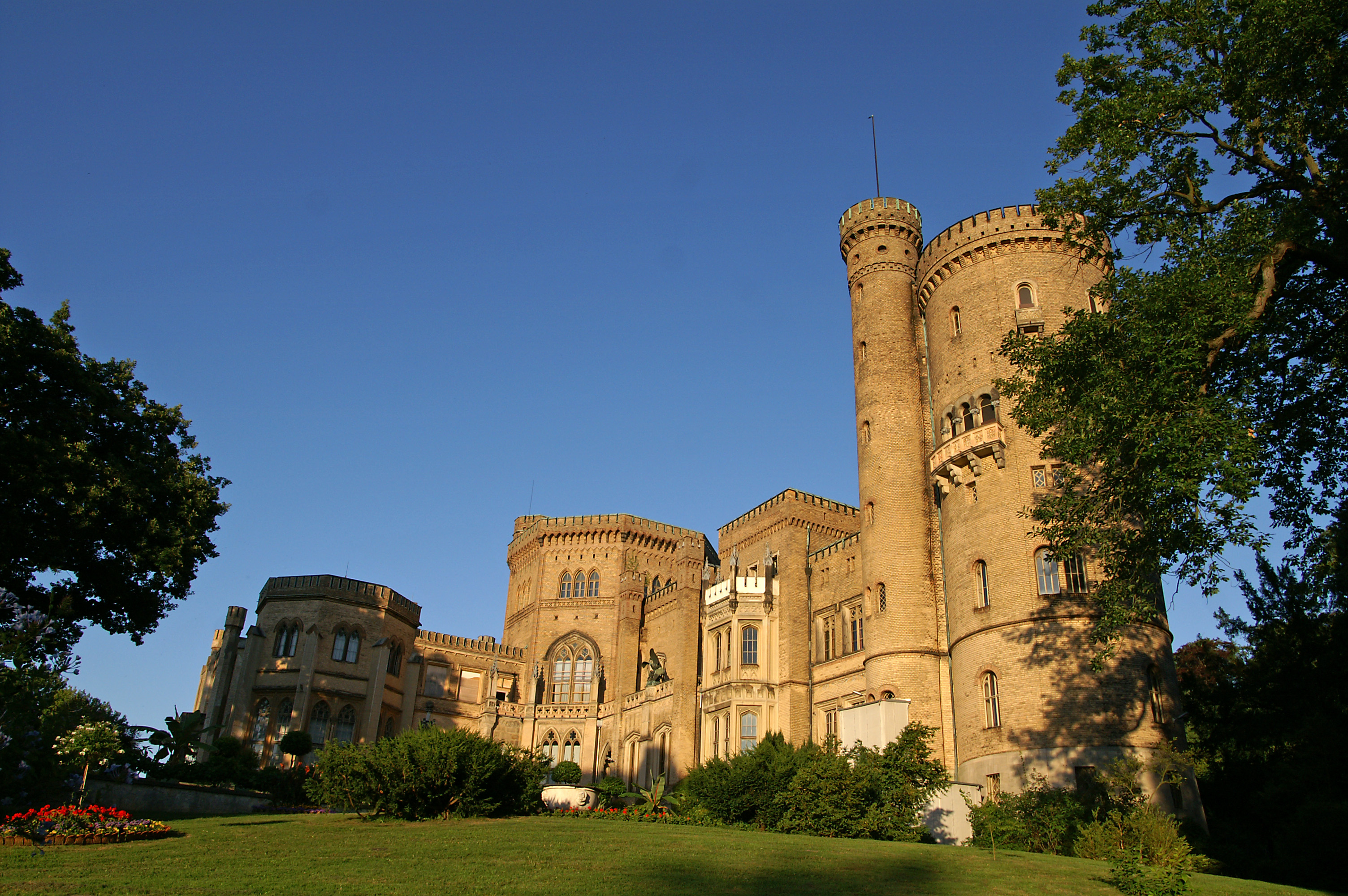
Babelsberg Palace

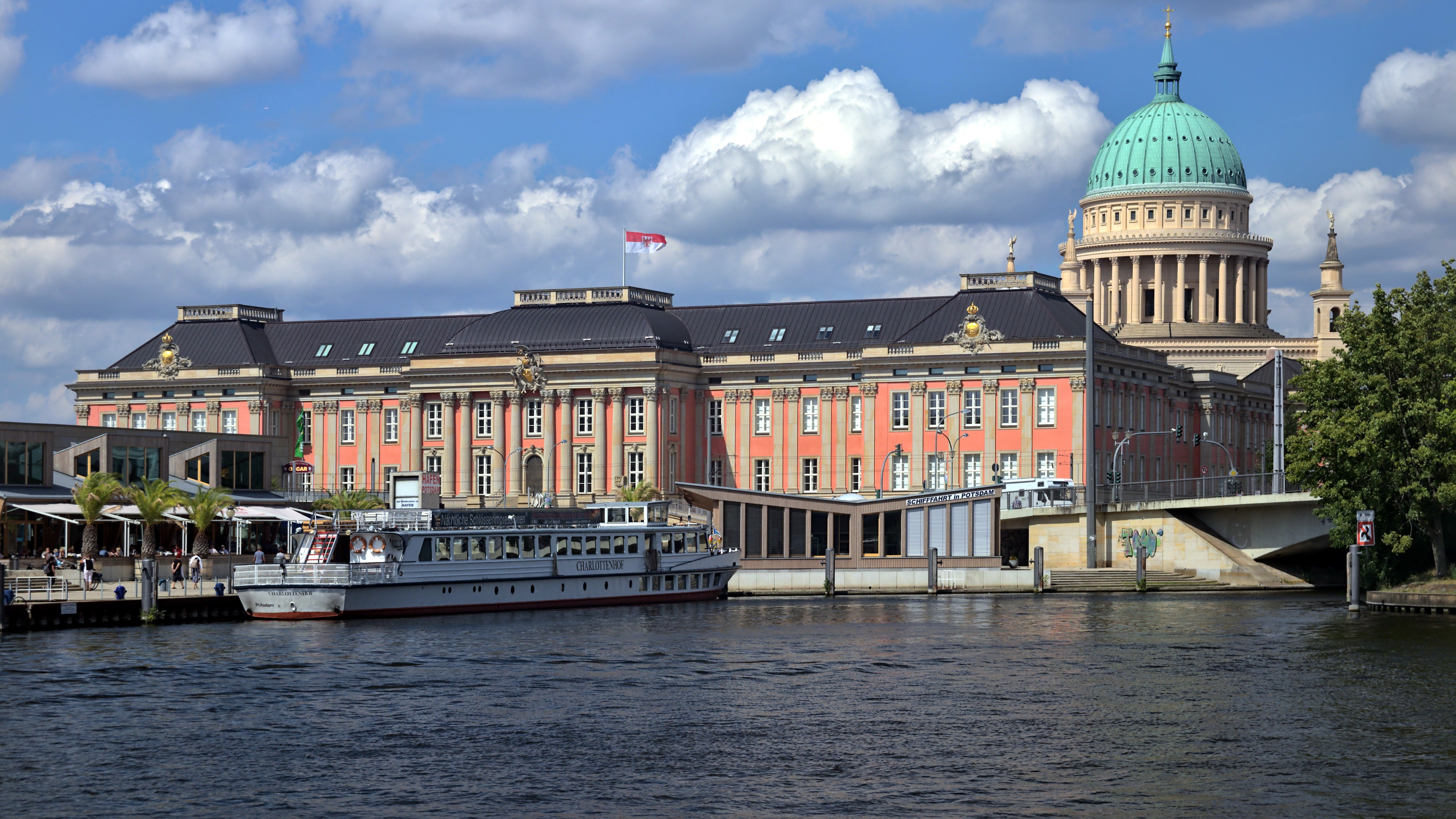
Stadtschloss / Potsdam City Palace

1. Babelsberg Palace, Babelsberg Park
2. Cecilienhof Palace, New Garden
3. Marble Palace, New Garden
4. Marquardt Palace
5. Little Palace in Babelsberg Park
6. Stadtschloss (City Palace)
7. New Palace, Sanssouci Park
8. Sacrow Palace
9. Kartzow Palace
10. Sanssouci Palace, Sanssouci Park
11. New Chambers, Sanssouci Park
12. Orangery Palace, Sanssouci Park
13. Satzkorn Manor House
14. Charlottenhof Palace, Sanssouci Park
15. Lindstedt Palace
16. Stern Hunting Lodge
17. Lichtenau Palace, at New Garden

=== Barnim District ===
1. Bärenkasten, Oderberg

=== Dahme-Spreewald District ===
1. Wasserschloss Fürstlich Drehna, Luckau
2. Königs Wusterhausen Palace, Königs Wusterhausen
3. Lustschloss Zeesen, Zeesen

=== Elbe-Elster District ===
1. Ahlsdorf Palace, Ahlsdorf near Schönewalde
2. Doberlug Palace, Doberlug-Kirchhain
3. Elsterwerda Palace, Elsterwerda
4. Finsterwalde Palace, Finsterwalde
5. Grochwitz Palace, Herzberg (Elster)
6. Lebusa Palace, Lebusa
7. Liebenwerda Palace (partly preserved), Bad Liebenwerda
8. Martinskirchen Palace, Martinskirchen
9. Mühlberg Palace, Mühlberg/Elbe
10. Neudeck/Elster Palace, Neudeck near Uebigau-Wahrenbrück
11. Sallgast Palace, Sallgast
12. Saathain Palace (destroyed), Saathain
13. Schlieben Palace (destroyed), Schlieben
14. Sonnewalde Palace, Sonnewalde
15. Stechau Palace, Stechau, municipality Fichtwald
16. Uebigau Palace, Uebigau-Wahrenbrück
17. Wahrenbrück Castle (destroyed), Uebigau-Wahrenbrück
18. Würdenhain Palace (destroyed), Würdenhain

=== Havelland District ===
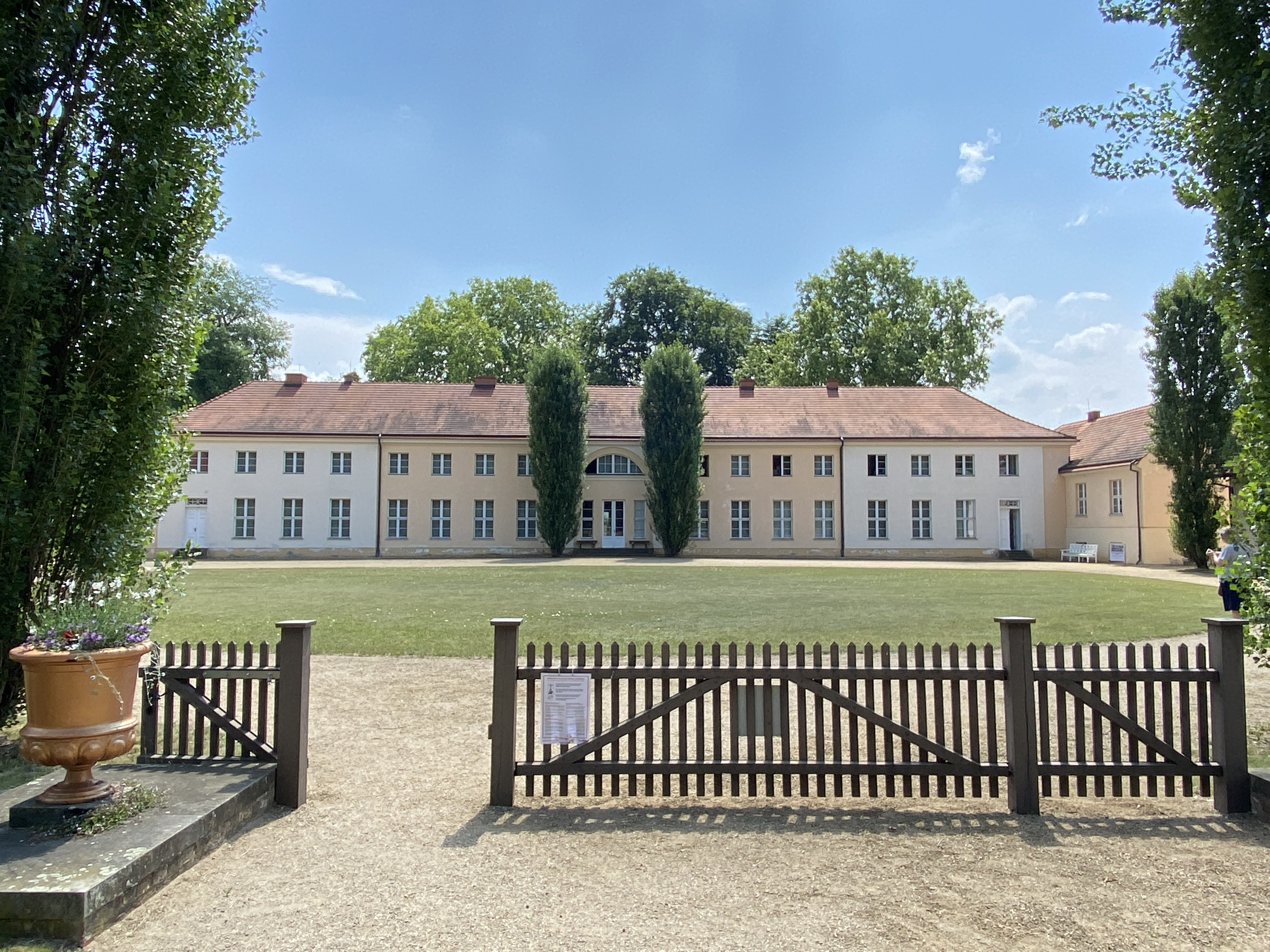
Paretz Palace

1. Friesack Castle, Friesack
2. Paretz Palace, Ketzin

=== Märkisch-Oderland District ===
1. Altranft Palace, Altranft
2. Gusow Palace, Gusow-Platkow
3. Neuhardenberg Palace, Neuhardenberg
4. Prötzel Palace, Prötzel

=== Oberhavel District ===
1. Meseberg Palace, Gransee
2. Vehlefanz Castle, Oberkrämer
3. Oranienburg Palace, Oranienburg
4. Liebenberg Palace, Löwenberger Land
5. Hoppenrade Palace, Löwenberger Land
6. Fürstenberg Palace, Fürstenberg/Havel
7. Dahmshöhe Palace, Fürstenberg/Havel

=== Oder-Spree District ===
1. Beeskow Castle, Beeskow
2. Friedland Castle, Friedland
3. Storkow Castle, Storkow (Mark)
4. Steinhöfel Palace, Steinhöfel
5. Fürstenwalde Palace (bishop’s residence), Fürstenwalde
6. Jagdschloss Fürstenwalde, Fürstenwalde

=== Ostprignitz-Ruppin District ===
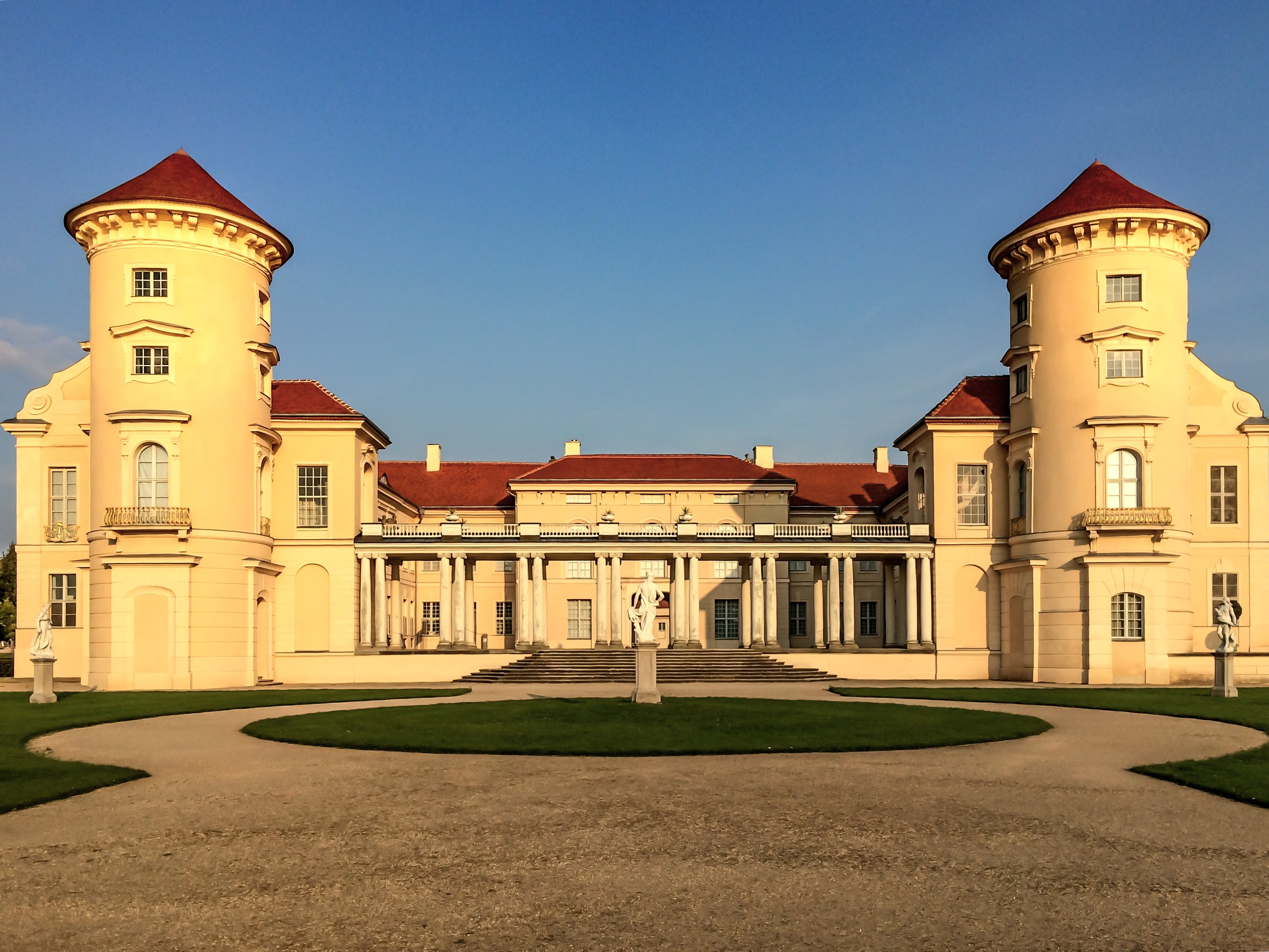
Rheinsberg Palace

1. Alte Bischofsburg, Wittstock / Dosse
2. Daberburg, Wittstock / Dosse
3. Garz Castle (Temnitztal), Garz
4. Goldbeck Castle, Goldbeck
5. Rheinsberg Palace, Rheinsberg
6. Wildberg Castle, Wildberg

=== Potsdam-Mittelmark District ===
1. Caputh Palace, Schwielowsee
2. Eisenhardt Castle, Belzig
3. Petzow Palace, Schwielowsee
4. Rabenstein Castle, Rabenstein / Fläming
5. Reckahn Palace, Kloster Lehnin
6. Wiesenburg Palace, Wiesenburg / Mark
7. Ziesar Castle, Ziesar

=== Prignitz District ===
1. Demerthin Palace, Gumtow
2. Gänseburg, Putlitz
3. Philipshof Palace, Putlitz
4. Plattenburg, Plattenburg
5. Palace Wolfshagen, Groß Pankow (Prignitz)

=== Teltow-Fläming District ===
1. Blankensee House (former manor house), Trebbin
2. Wiepersdorf Palace, Niederer Fläming

=== Uckermark District ===
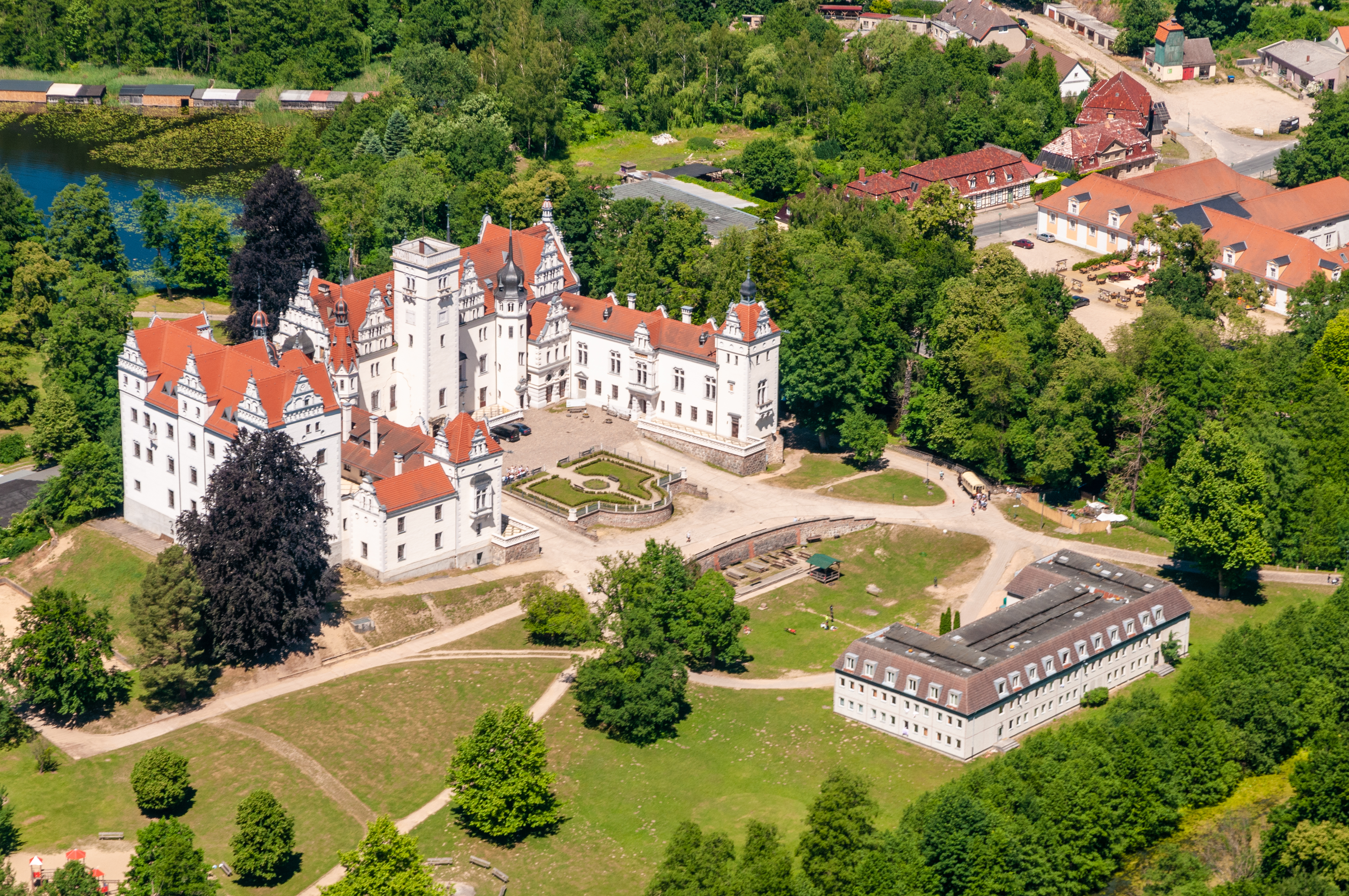
Schloss Boitzenburg

1. Blankenburg Castle, Uckerland
2. Boitzenburg Palace, Boitzenburger Land
3. Gerswalde Castle, Gerswalde
4. Greiffenberg Castle, Angermünde
5. Schwedt Palace (destroyed), Schwedt
6. Castle Stolpe (Grützpott), Angermünde
7. Wartin Castle (Uckermark), Uckerland
8. Zichow Castle, Zichow

== See also ==
- List of castles
- List of castles in Germany
