= Ulrich Wöhnert =

German Luftwaffe pilot (1914–1947)

- Born: 24 October 1914; Wolfshagen, German Empire
- Died: 14 August 1947 (aged 32); Kutaisi, Soviet Union
- Military career
- Allegiance: Nazi Germany
- Branch: Luftwaffe
- Service years: ?–1945
- Rank: Leutnant (second lieutenant)
- Unit: JG 54
- Conflicts: World War II: Eastern Front
- Awards: Knight's Cross of the Iron Cross

Ulrich Wöhnert (24 October 1914 – 14 August 1947) was a Luftwaffe ace and recipient of the Knight's Cross of the Iron Cross during World War II. The Knight's Cross of the Iron Cross, and its variants were the highest awards in the military and paramilitary forces of Nazi Germany during World War II. During his career he was credited with 86 aerial victories, all over the Eastern Front.

== Career ==
Wöhnert was born on 24 October 1914 in Wolfshagen in the Province of Brandenburg within the German Empire, present-day part of Uckerland in Brandenburg.

On 7 April 1944 at 21:25 in the evening, Wöhnert was injured during an aerial bombing attack on Wesenberg, present-day Rakvere, keeping him out of combat for some time. Following his convalescence, he was assigned to 1. Staffel.

=== Squadron leader ===
In August 1944, Wöhnert was appointed Staffelkapitän (squadron leader) of 5. Staffel of Jgadgeschwader 54, replacing Oberleutnant Wilhelm Schilling in this capacity. The Staffel was subordinated to II. Gruppe of JG 54 under command of Major Erich Rudorffer. On 6 December, Wöhnert was awarded the Knight's Cross of the Iron Cross (Ritterkreuz des Eisernen Kreuzes) for 86 aerial victories claimed.

In May 1945, he was taken prisoner of war (POW) by Soviet forces. Imprisoned in a Soviet POW camp at Kutaisi, he died on 14 August 1947. Official reports state that he died of pneumonia while fellow inmates claim that he committed suicide.

== Summary of career ==
=== Aerial victory claims ===
According to Spick, Wöhnert was credited with 86 aerial victories claimed in an unknown number of missions, all of which on the Eastern Front. Scutts lists him with the same number of aerial victories. Mathews and Foreman, authors of Luftwaffe Aces — Biographies and Victory Claims, researched the German Federal Archives and found records for at least 83 aerial victory claims, all of which claimed on the Eastern Front.

Victory claims were logged to a map-reference (PQ = Planquadrat), for example "PQ 47622". The Luftwaffe grid map (Jägermeldenetz) covered all of Europe, western Russia and North Africa and was composed of rectangles measuring 15 minutes of latitude by 30 minutes of longitude, an area of about 360 square miles (930 km^{2}). These sectors were then subdivided into 36 smaller units to give a location area 3 km × 4 km (1.9 mi × 2.5 mi) in size.

Chronicle of aerial victories
This and the ? (question mark) indicates information discrepancies listed by Prien, Stemmer, Rodeike, Bock, Mathews and Foreman.
| Claim | Date | Time | Type | Location | Claim | Date | Time | Type | Location |
– 2. Staffel of Jagdgeschwader 54 – Eastern Front — 1 May 1942 – 3 February 1943
| 1 | 21 July 1942 | 19:40 | Il-2 | | 3 | 29 September 1942 | 09:15 | Yak-1 | 3 km (1.9 mi) west of Ostrowskij; 3 km (1.9 mi) north of Dubrovka |
| 2 | 15 August 1942 | 12:35 | MiG-3 | PQ 47622; 15 km (9.3 mi) west-southwest of Staritsa | | | | | |
– 2. Staffel of Jagdgeschwader 54 – Eastern Front — 4 February – 31 December 1943
| 4 | 16 March 1943 | 16:32? (Note: According to Mathews and Foreman claimed at 16:57.) | LaGG-3 | PQ 35 Ost 18211; 30 km (19 mi) southeast of Staraya Russa | 25 | 31 August 1943 | 13:59 | La-5 | PQ 35 Ost 25464; 20 km (12 mi) west of Yelnya |
| ? (Note: This claim is not listed by Prien, Stemmer, Rodeike and Bock.) | 16 April 1943 | 19:04 | La-5 | 10 km (6.2 mi) south of Lomonosov | 26 | 31 August 1943 | 14:01 | La-5 | PQ 35 Ost 35371; 5 km (3.1 mi) southwest of Yelnya |
| 5 | 8 June 1943 | 16:14 | P-40 | PQ 36 Ost 10282; 35 km (22 mi) west-southwest of Volkhov | 27 | 2 September 1943 | 13:11 | LaGG-3 | PQ 35 Ost 45413; 35 km (22 mi) northwest of Mosalsk |
| 6 | 21 June 1943 | 10:45 | LaGG-3 | PQ 36 Ost 0188; 20 km (12 mi) northwest of Shlisselburg | 28 | 4 September 1943 | 16:32 | LaGG-3 | PQ 35 Ost 35532; 20 km (12 mi) southeast of Yelnya |
| 7 | 6 July 1943 | 14:34 | La-5 | PQ 35 Ost 63582; 20 km (12 mi) southwest of Maloarkhangelsk | 29 | 5 September 1943 | 11:15 | Il-2 | PQ 35 Ost 35371; 5 km (3.1 mi) southwest of Yelnya |
| 8 | 17 July 1943 | 19:01 | Yak-4 | PQ 35 Ost 63831; 40 km (25 mi) southeast of Maloarkhangelsk | 30 | 7 September 1943 | 15:16 | LaGG-3 | PQ 35 Ost 44134; 15 km (9.3 mi) south-southeast of Kirov |
| 9 | 20 July 1943 | 12:37 | LaGG-3 | PQ 35 Ost 64875; 25 km (16 mi) south of Mtsensk | 31 | 7 September 1943 | 15:17 | LaGG-3 | PQ 35 Ost 44122; 15 km (9.3 mi) south of Kirov |
| 10 | 20 July 1943 | 13:08 | Il-2 | PQ 35 Ost 63241; 35 km (22 mi) southeast of Oryol | 32 | 7 September 1943 | 15:20 | LaGG-3 | PQ 35 Ost 44114; 20 km (12 mi) southwest of Kirov |
| 11 | 21 July 1943 | 04:34 | Yak-7 | PQ 35 Ost 53127; 20 km (12 mi) east-southeast of Tschaikowka | 33 | 7 September 1943 | 15:23 | LaGG-3 | PQ 35 Ost 44144; 25 km (16 mi) southwest of Kirov |
| 12 | 4 August 1943 | 09:41 | Il-2 | PQ 35 Ost 53433; 30 km (19 mi) south-southwest of Oryol | 34 | 9 September 1943 | 12:31 | LaGG-3 | PQ 35 Ost 45882; 25 km (16 mi) east-southeast of Kirov |
| 13 | 13 August 1943 | 17:14 | La-5 | PQ 35 Ost 51652; Grayvoron-Zolochiv | 35 | 10 September 1943 | 13:21 | LaGG-3 | PQ 35 Ost 44144; 25 km (16 mi) southwest of Kirov |
| 14 | 14 August 1943 | 07:04 | La-5 | PQ 35 Ost 51674; 15 km (9.3 mi) north of Bohodukhiv | 36 | 11 September 1943 | 14:29 | LaGG-3 | PQ 35 Ost 34243; 25 km (16 mi) northeast of Seshchinskaya |
| 15 | 14 August 1943 | 15:01 | LaGG-3 | PQ 35 Ost 51731; 10 km (6.2 mi) northwest of Bogoduchow | 37? (Note: This claim is not listed by Mathews and Foreman.) | 14 September 1943 | 16:12 | Yak-9 | PQ 35 Ost 26442 |
| 16 | 19 August 1943 | 05:46 | LaGG-3 | PQ 35 Ost 51621; 25 km (16 mi) east-southeast of Sevsk | 38 | 24 September 1943 | 10:53 | La-5 | PQ 35 Ost 12361 |
| 17 | 19 August 1943 | 05:47 | LaGG-3 | PQ 35 Ost 51623, Graiworon vicinity of Grayvoron | 39 | 9 October 1943 | 08:45 | P-39 | PQ 35 Ost 06114; 10 km (6.2 mi) northeast of Nevel |
| 18 | 20 August 1943 | 05:41 | LaGG-3 | PQ 35 Ost 51723; 20 km (12 mi) southeast of Okhtyrka | 40 | 10 October 1943 | 08:06 | Il-2 | PQ 35 Ost 06163 northwest of Lake Jzenniza |
| 19 | 20 August 1943 | 05:47 | LaGG-3 | PQ 35 Ost 51724; 20 km (12 mi) northwest of Bohodukhiv | 41 | 11 October 1943 | 14:40 | Il-2 | PQ 35 Ost 06272 |
| 20 | 20 August 1943 | 09:47 | La-5 | PQ 35 Ost 41621 | 42 | 12 October 1943 | 07:52 | Il-2 | PQ 35 Ost 96232, southeast of Nevel; 10 km (6.2 mi) south of Nevel |
| 21 | 22 August 1943 | 10:33 | La-5 | PQ 35 Ost 41691 | 43 | 12 October 1943 | 07:53 | Il-2 | PQ 35 Ost 96232, southeast of Nevel; 10 km (6.2 mi) south of Nevel |
| 22 | 24 August 1943 | 07:40 | La-5 | PQ 35 Ost 51553 northeast of Bohodukhiv | 44 | 13 October 1943 | 08:09 | LaGG-3 | PQ 35 Ost 15531 northeast of Gorki |
| 23 | 25 August 1943 | 05:22 | La-5 | PQ 35 Ost 51543 northeast of Bohodukhiv | 45 | 15 October 1943 | 10:04 | LaGG-3 | PQ 35 Ost 15534, northeast of Gorki |
| 24 | 26 August 1943 | 15:19 | Pe-2 | PQ 35 Ost 41813 | | | | | |
– 2. Staffel of Jagdgeschwader 54 – Eastern Front — 1 January – 7 April 1944
| 46 | 3 February 1944 | 14:16 | Il-2 | PQ 35 Ost 06511 | 50 | 21 March 1944 | 09:18? (Note: According to Mathews and Foreman claimed at 09:16.) | Il-2 | PQ 26 Ost 70443; Baltic Sea, 30 km (19 mi) northeast of Hungerburg |
| 47 | 5 March 1944 | 16:15 | Yak-9 | PQ 26 Ost 80713; 20 km (12 mi) south of Narva | 51 | 30 March 1944 | 14:13 | Pe-2 | PQ 26 Ost 70653; 15 km (9.3 mi) southwest of Hungerburg |
| 48 | 8 March 1944 | 14:24 | La-5 | PQ 26 Ost 80552 east of Narva | 52 | 3 April 1944 | 16:58? (Note: According to Mathews and Foreman claimed at 16:56.) | Pe-2 | PQ 26 Ost 60433 northeast of Kunda |
| 49 | 19 March 1944 | 10:06 | LaGG-3 | PQ 26 Ost 70354; Baltic Sea, 35 km (22 mi) northeast of Kunda | 53 | 3 April 1944 | 17:00 | Pe-2 | PQ 26 Ost 70343; Baltic Sea, 30 km (19 mi) northeast of Kunda |
– 1. Staffel of Jagdgeschwader 54 – Eastern Front — July – August 1944
| 54 | 3 July 1944 | 11:46 | Il-2 | PQ OS-6/5; Polotsk | 61 | 28 July 1944 | 17:18 | P-39 | PQ KH-9/1 |
| 55 | 21 July 1944 | 14:41 | Yak-9 | PQ NM-5/1 | 62 | 28 July 1944 | 17:19 | P-39 | PQ KH-9/8 |
| 56 | 22 July 1944 | 16:40 | Yak-9 | PQ NQ-1/1 | 63 | 29 July 1944 | 16:18 | Il-2 | PQ MM-8/4 south of Subate |
| 57 | 23 July 1944 | 08:35 | Pe-2 | PQ ON-5/6 south of Zarasai | 64 | 29 July 1944 | 16:18 | Il-2 | PQ MM-8/4 south of Subate |
| 58 | 27 July 1944 | 15:52 | P-39 | PQ KH-9/7; Mitau | 65 | 6 August 1944 | 18:35 | Yak-9 | PQ MK-2/3 |
| 59 | 27 July 1944 | 17:48 | Pe-2 | PQ KH-3/5; Mitau | 66 | 6 August 1944 | 18:37 | Yak-9 | PQ MK-2/3 |
| 60 | 27 July 1944 | 17:49 | Pe-2 | PQ KH-3/6; Mitau | 67 | 7 August 1944 | 18:04 | Yak-9 | PQ LN-3/2 |
– 5. Staffel of Jagdgeschwader 54 – Eastern Front — August – 31 December 1944
| 68 | 25 August 1944 | 13:48 | Yak-9 | PQ 25 Ost 57266; 40 km (25 mi) north of Kreuzburg | 77 | 19 September 1944 | 15:42 | Il-2 | PQ 25 Ost 69217 east of Weissenstein |
| 69 | 26 August 1944 | 11:19 | Yak-9 | PQ 25 Ost 69641 west of Dorpat | 78 | 19 September 1944 | 15:45 | Il-2 | PQ 25 Ost 69245; 20 km (12 mi) southeast of Fellin |
| 70 | 26 August 1944 | 11:35 | Yak-9 | PQ 25 Ost 69626 north of Dorpat | 79 | 21 September 1944 | 16:30 | Il-2 | PQ 25 Ost 58413; 25 km (16 mi) southwest of Walk |
| 71 | 28 August 1944 | 17:00 | La-5 | PQ 25 Ost 69664 | 80? | 26 September 1944 | 16:28 | Il-2 | PQ 25 Ost 58575 |
| 72 | 3 September 1944 | 10:48 | Il-2 | PQ 26 Ost 60499 northeast of Kunda | 81 | 28 September 1944 | 14:34? (Note: According to Mathews and Foreman claimed at 14:37.) | Il-2 | PQ 25 Ost 48822, east of Riga north of Mālpils |
| 73 | 3 September 1944 | 10:50 | Yak-9 | PQ 26 Ost 60634 vicinity of Kotka | 82 | 28 September 1944 | 14:41 | Il-2 | PQ 25 Ost 48865, east of Riga; 20 km (12 mi) north-northwest of Mālpils |
| 74 | 17 September 1944 | 10:29 | Il-2 | PQ 25 Ost 57224; 50 km (31 mi) north-northwest of Kreuzburg | 83 | 9 October 1944 | 14:15 | Yak-9 | PQ 25 Ost 17845; 30 km (19 mi) northeast of Polangen |
| 75 | 17 September 1944 | 17:02 | Yak-9 | PQ 25 Ost 57166; 35 km (22 mi) southeast of Mālpils | 84? | 14 October 1944 | 14:07 | Yak-9 | PQ 25 Ost 17761 |
| 76 | 19 September 1944 | 15:05 | Pe-2 | PQ 25 Ost 59828 north of Weissenstein | 85 | 22 October 1944 | 14:20 | P-39 | PQ 25 Ost 17591; 35 km (22 mi) southeast of Pillau |

=== Awards ===
- Iron Cross (1939) 2nd and 1st Class
- Honor Goblet of the Luftwaffe (Ehrenpokal der Luftwaffe) on 8 November 1943 as Oberfeldwebel and pilot
- German Cross in Gold on 14 November 1943 as Oberfeldwebel in the 2./Jagdgeschwader 54
- Knight's Cross of the Iron Cross on 6 December 1944 as Leutnant and pilot in the 5./Jagdgeschwader 54
