= Heilig-Geist-Kirche (Potsdam) =

Coordinates: 52°23′49″N 13°4′13″E

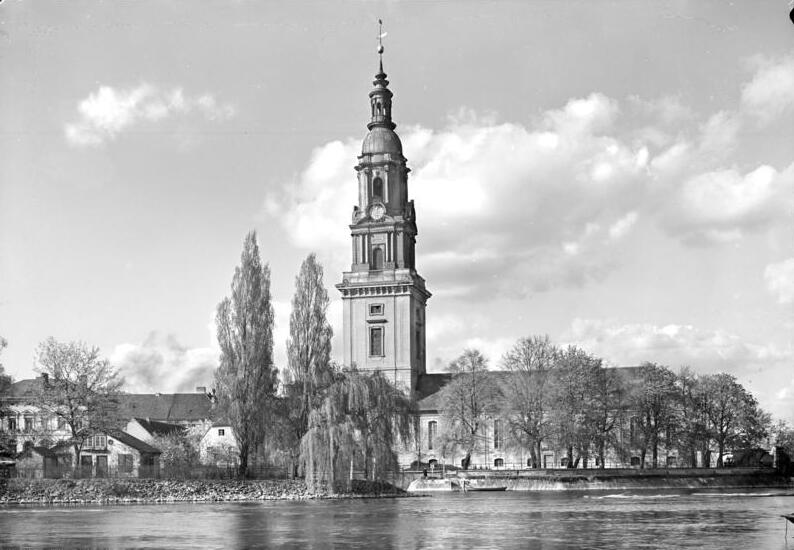
View of the Heilig-Geist-Kirche from Havel, before 1945

The Heilig-Geist-Kirche, Heiliggeistkirche or Heiligengeistkirche was a church in Potsdam dedicated to the Holy Spirit. It was built in 1726-1728 to Baroque designs by Pierre de Gayette and Johann Friedrich Grael with an 86-metre-high tower. It, the Garrison Church and the Nikolaikirche formed the "three church view".

It burned down in the Second World War. The SED leadership had the nave ruins demolished in 1961 and the tower blown up in 1974. Since 1997 the Residenz Heilig Geist Park old people's home has stood on the site, with a tower intended to evoke the former church tower.

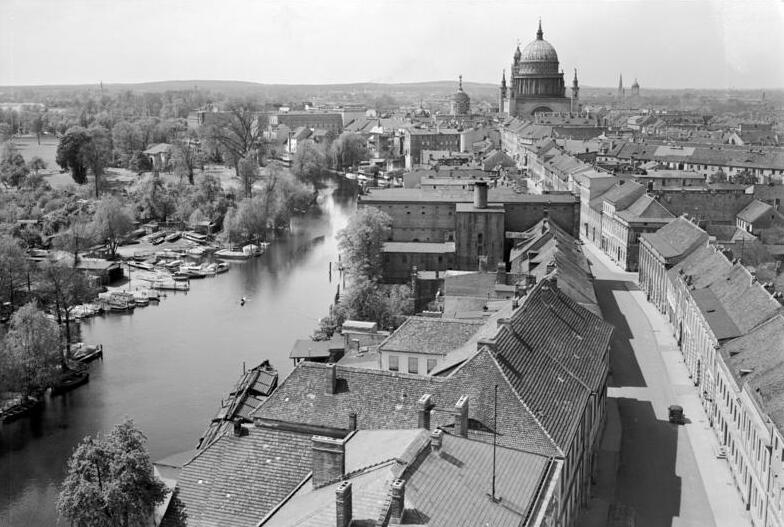
View of the Heilig-Geist-Kirche and Nikolaikirche, before 1945

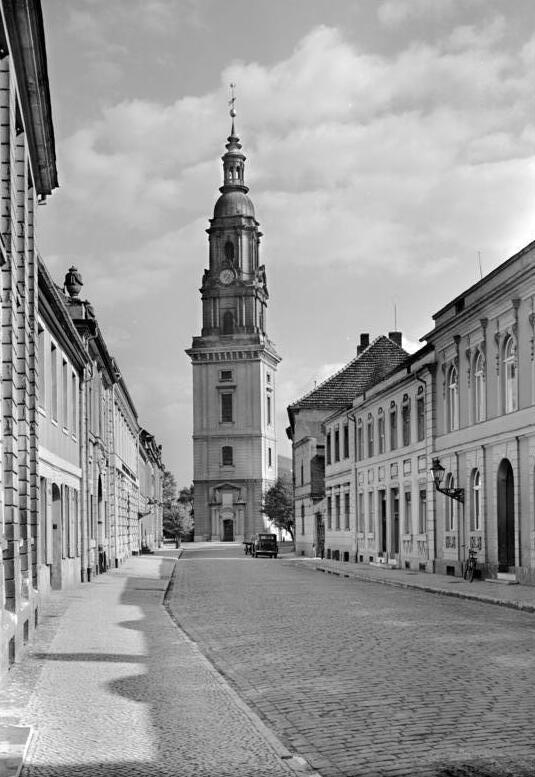
The church seen from Burgstraße, before 1945

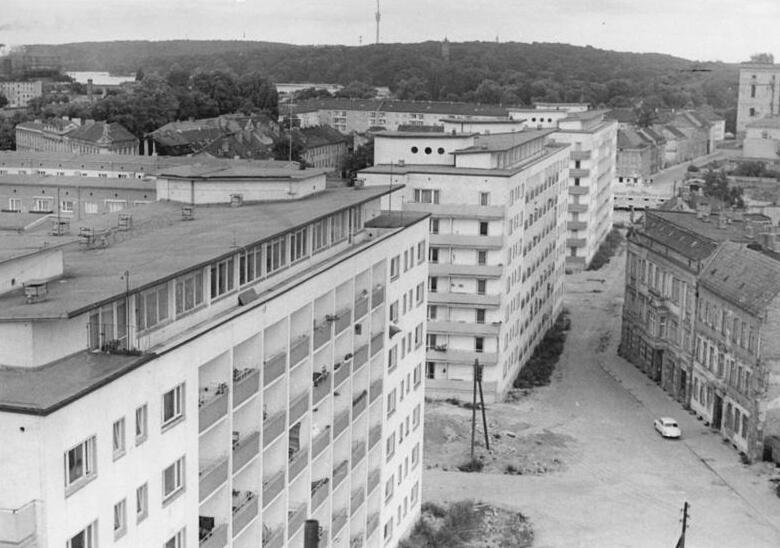
View of the ruined tower (top right), 1964

== Bibliography ==
- Andreas Kitschke: Die Kirchen der Potsdamer Kulturlandschaft. Lukas Verlag, Berlin 2017, ISBN 978-3-86732-248-5. p. 66–73. Digitalisat
- Friedrich Mielke: Potsdamer Baukunst – Das klassische Potsdam. Propyläen-Verlag, Berlin 1981, ISBN 978-3-549-06648-5, p. 363.
- Uwe Schieferdecker: Erinnerungen an Potsdam wie es einmal war. Wartberg Verlag, 1. Auflage 2001.
- Richard Schneider: Potsdam Photographiert um 1900. Nicolai, Berlin, 2. verbesserte Auflage 2005.
- Hans Berg: Die verlorene Potsdamer Mitte. Eigenverlag, Berlin 1999, p. 19–21 (with an illustration of the dedicatory inscription of Frederick William I)

== External links (in German) ==
- Jana Haase: Abriss ohne Aufschrei. In: Potsdamer Neueste Nachrichten. 26. April 2014
- Holger Zürch (2023-01-08). "Sonntagskirche № 63: Die verlorene Heilig-Geist-Kirche Potsdam". Leipziger Internet Zeitung.
