= Pierre de Gayette =

Pierre de Gayette (1699-1747) was a Prussian architect of French Huguenot descent active in the service of Frederick William I of Prussia as an 'Ingenieurkapitän' (captain in the military engineers) and court architect. He is considered the designer of the urban replanning carried out in Potsdam under that king.

== Life ==
Little evidence survives on his youth and his birthplace is unknown. His father Jacob moved to Potsdam after fleeing to Metz following the revocation of the Edict of Nantes. In 1712, at Wesel, he was made a military engineer and geometer leading works, with the rank of lieutenant. Four years later he was promoted to captain, again in the engineers. From the 1720s onwards he also served as a court architect at Potsdam in collaboration with the Dutch architect Stegmann. Implicated in incorrect billing, Stegmann killed himself in 1724, leaving de Gayette in sole charge of building projects in Potsdam.

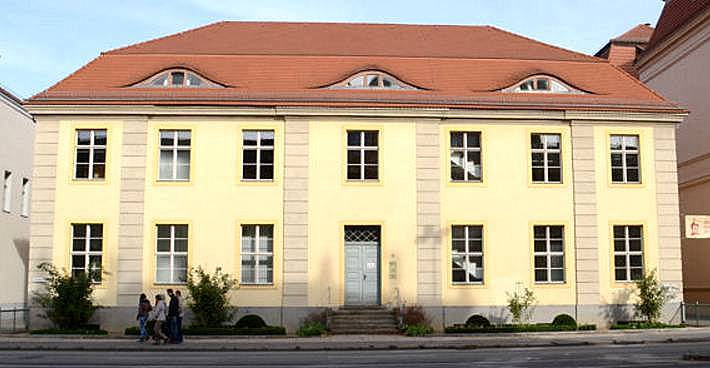
House at 9, Breite Straße in Potsdam, designed by de Gayette.

Frederick William I expanded the city limits twice and again from 1720 to 1734 several town houses and public buildings were built to de Gayette's plans. Initially these were simple half-timbered buildings, often replaced by stone ones in following years. The town hall designed by de Gayette in 1722 had already been replaced by a new one in 1753. A small number of houses were built during the first urban expansion begun in 1721, including some buildings by de Gayette which have survived, characterised by a mansard roof and an economical structure of façades of lesenes and cornices, for example at 4 Am Kanal (1724), 9 Henning-von-Tresckow-Straße (1730) and the diet house at 9 Breite Straße (c. 1724).

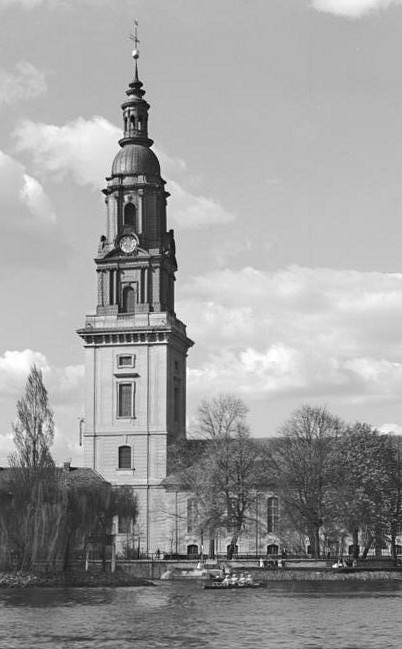
Heilig-Geist-Kirche, Potsdam, whose nave was designed by Pierre de Gayette.

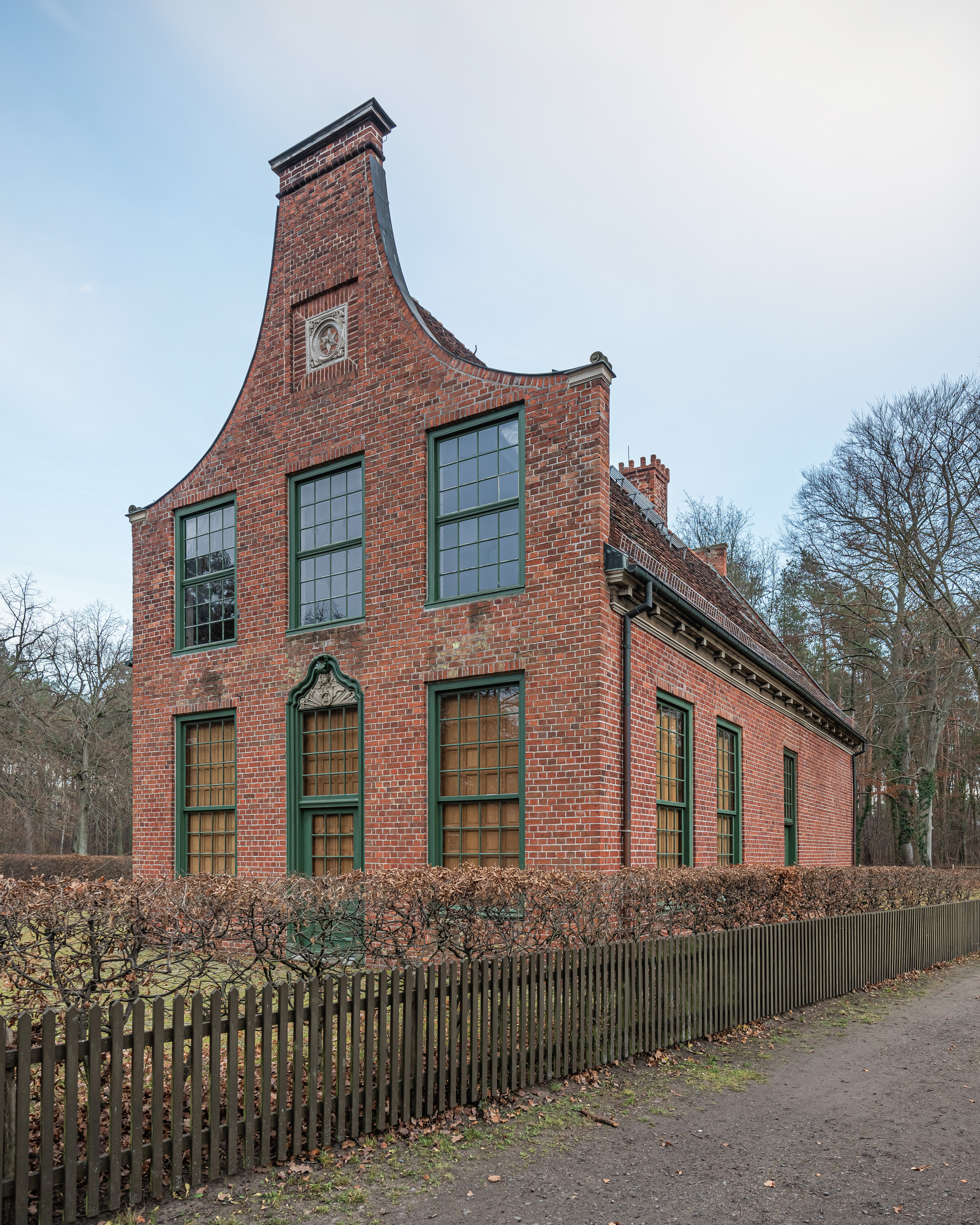
The Stern hunting pavilion in Potsdam

In 1726, after the demolition of the 17th century princely residence at the far west of the old town by the "Slav Wall", de Gayette designed a nave for Heilig-Geist-Kirche, with Johann Friedrich Grael adding a clock tower in 1728. de Gayette supervised the construction of the Stern Hunting Lodge between 1730 and 1732, the only royal residence built under the economical 'king-sergeant'.

The second extension to Potsdam began in 1733 and was incomplete on the king's death in 1740. de Gayette and Andreas Berger designed most of the buildings with half-timbered or stone facades, although the Dutch Quarter was instead designed by Johan Bouman. de Gayette was particularly responsible for the ranges of houses on Lindenstrasse and at the Nauener Tor. It is uncertain who designed the façade of the 1738-1739 city school or Großen Stadtschule on Nauenstrasse (now Friedrich-Ebert-Straße) - some attribute it to de Gayette and others to Friedrich Wilhelm Dieterichs.

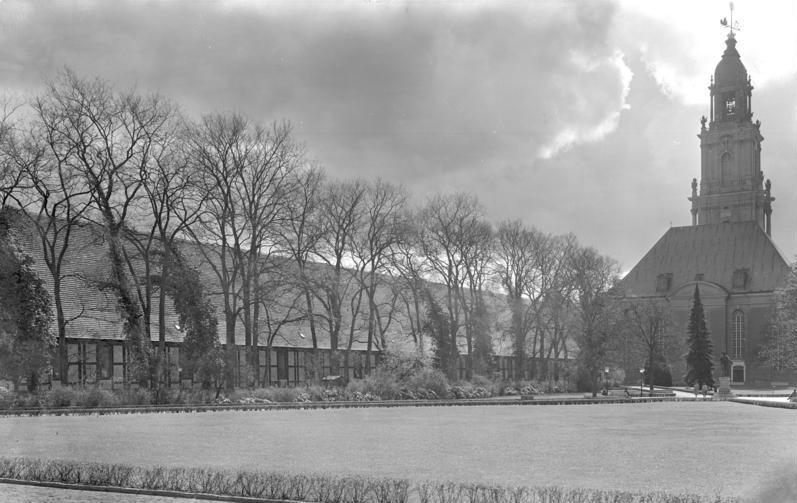
West side of the Langer Stall, with the back of the Garrison Church to the right.

In 1734 the Langer Stall was built in the Garrison Church district as a 150-metre-long wooden riding arena and exercise hall, to a design by de Gayette. David Gilly noted the daring construction of its roof in his 1798 architecture manual. Georg Christian Unger designed a new façade and massive gateway for the building in 1781 and four years later a new linked building on its north side. The Langer Stall was the only major building in the city made of wood between 1720 and 1734 to survive into the 20th century, but was completely destroyed by fire in the British air raids of 14 and 15 April 1945. Only the 1781 gateway survives.

de Gayette was inactive early in Frederick the Great's reign but in 1745 produced maps of the palaces of Sanssouci and Höneberg and plans for new gardens to the west of Sanssouci. He died in Potsdam.

== Family ==
Pierre de Gayette married twice and had several descendents, including four men in the Prussian Army:

- Friedrich (22 February 1726 - 13 October 1796), captain in the 29th Infantry Regiment
- Friedrich Leopold (died 3 November 1759), 5th Hussar Regiment, died of wounds received at the Battle of Kunersdorf
- Siegmund Wilhelm Heinrich (born 1733), father of major general Karl Ludwig von Gayette (1773 – 1856)
- Karl Adam (died 20 October 1803), who retired at the rank of commander

== Bibliography (in German) ==
- Hermann Heckmann: Baumeister des Barock und Rokoko in Brandenburg-Preußen. Berlin 1998, ISBN 3345006316
- Saur: Allgemeines Künstlerlexikon. Band 50, 2006, ISBN 3598227906
