= Friedrich Wilhelm von Jagow =

Prussian general

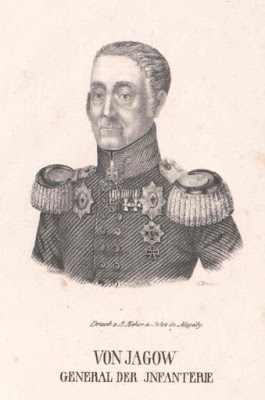

Friedrich Wilhelm Christian Ludwig von Jagow (8 September 1771, in Wolfshagen – 2 December 1857, in Berlin) was a Prussian General of Infantry who fought in the Napoleonic Wars.
