= Leipziger Internet Zeitung =

Online newspaper in based in Germany

- Type: Daily newspaper
- Format: online
- Owner(s): Mitteldeutsche Online Medien Ltd.
- Publisher: Ralf Julke
- Founded: 2004
- Headquarters: Haus der Demokratie; Bernhard-Göring-Straße 152; Leipzig, Germany
- Circulation: 240.000 unique visitors/month
- Price: free
- Website: www.l-iz.de

Leipziger Internet Zeitung (also: l-iz or Lizzy) is a daily online newspaper in the greater Leipzig region of Germany. The newspaper reports on events in various areas, such as politics, economics, culture, education, and sports. In addition, it has built up a large archive on local news in the past years (30.000 articles, 2011). This includes standard news reporting, but also commentary and photo journalism.
