= Bärenkasten =

Castle

Coordinates: 52°51′43″N 14°02′20″E

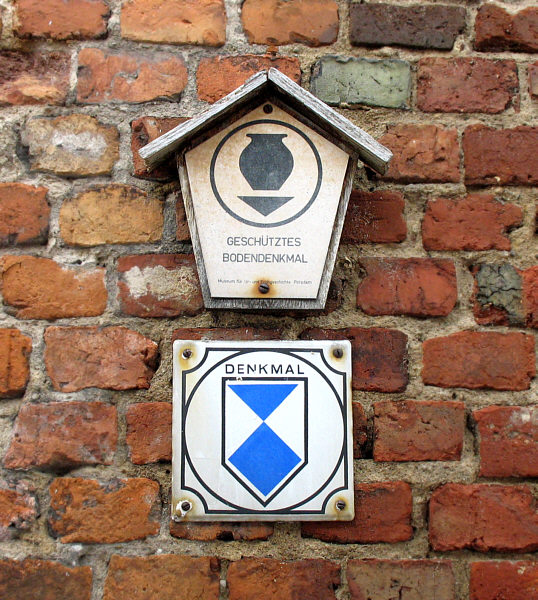
Monument conservation sign

Bärenkasten is a ruined castle in Oderberg, Brandenburg, Germany.

The castle was built in the second part of the 14th century. It was built in the south of the city to protect the passage over the River Oder. During the Thirty Years' War the castle was enlarged in phases. The castle was gradually demolished between 1730 and 1754.

== Resources ==
- Georg Dehio et al.: Handbuch der deutschen Kunstdenkmäler - Die Bezirke Cottbus und Frankfurt/Oder, Seite 306; Akademie-Verlag Berlin, 1987; ISBN 3-05-000363-4
- Denkmalliste des Landes Brandenburg, Landkreis Barnim (PDF-Datei; 202 kB)
