= Johann Friedrich Grael =

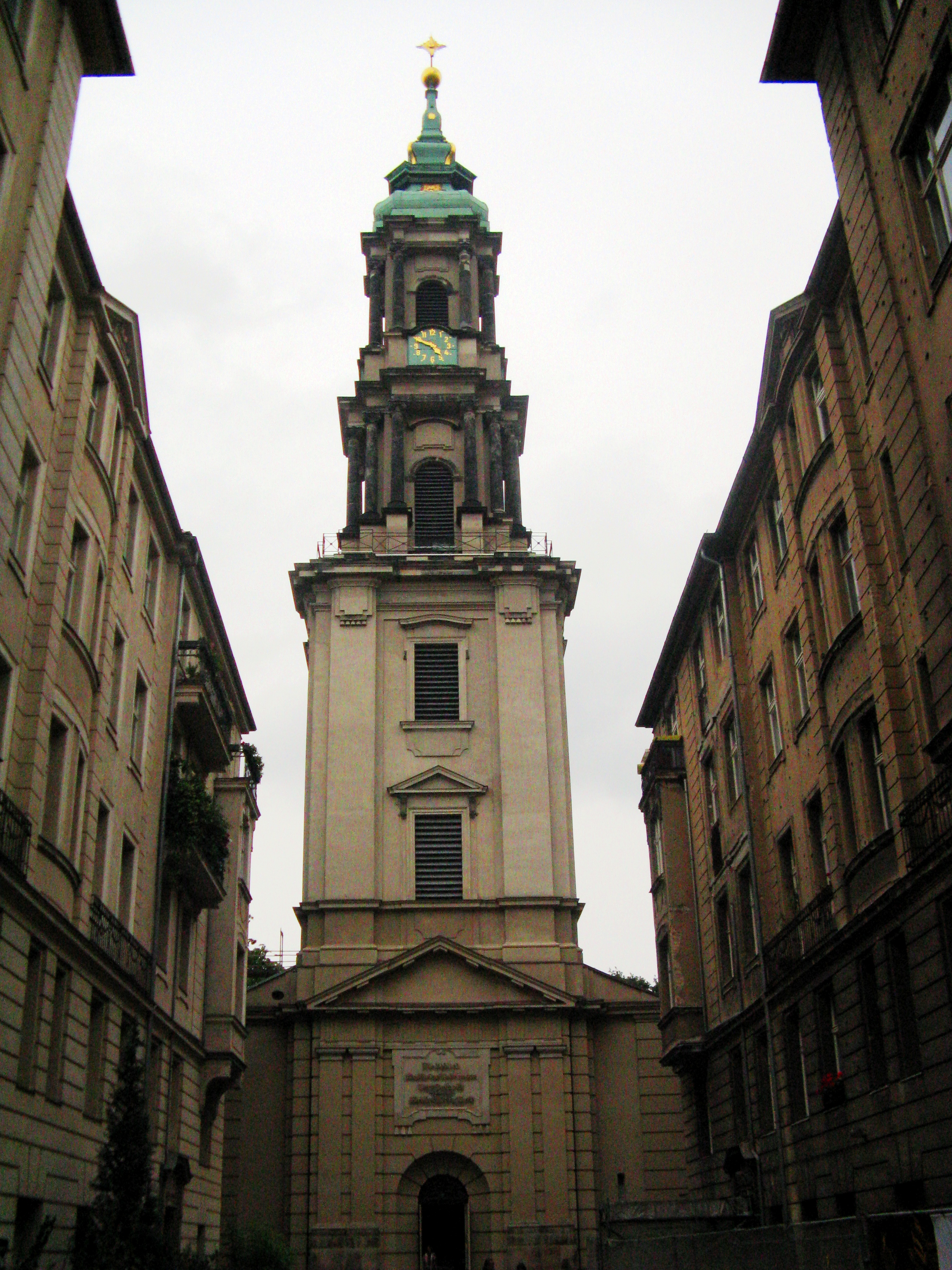
Tower of the Sophienkirche in Berlin-Mitte

Johann Grael (9 January 1708 - 27 September 1740) was a German architect, one of the most important architects working under Frederick William I of Prussia.

== Life ==
Born in Quilitz, he studied under Philipp Wihelm and Martin Heinrich Böhme. His first work in Berlin was a design for the church tower of the Petrikirche, but in 1730 - when construction was almost complete - a lightening storm hit it and he could not complete it. Grael was put in charge of rebuilding the structure but in 1733 it was reassigned to Gerlach, citing his failure to meet deadlines. The bell tower collapsed in the following years and Grael was left in a difficult situation, forcing him to flee the country. The church was damaged during the Second World War and demolished in 1964.

Before his exile he managed to complete the towers at the Sophienkirche in Berlin and the Heilige-Geist-Kirche in Potsdam, in a style consistent with the Dutch school. In his last years Grael worked as a consultant and a designer to various projects but -thanks to his sudden death in Bayreuth - these were completed by J. G. Weise.

== Other works ==
- Design of the fountain on the Roßmarkt in Stettin (1730);
- Interior of the Stadtschloss Berlin (1732), destroyed in the Second World War;
- Schwedt riding hall and dining hall (directed works 1735-1736);
- Reconstruction of the old castle in the Eremo in Bayreuth (1736);
- Design for the Kaiserhammer hunting lodge (1739);
- Private buildings in Berlin:
  - Kameke Palace (later the Rederns Palace; 1729-1736) and Borck-Saldern Palace, both at the corner of Pariser Platz / Unter den Linden (;
  - Palazzo Grumbkow, Königsstraße (now Rathausstraße);
  - Eberbach House, Königsstraße (now Rathausstraße);
  - Weizel House, Spandauer Straße;
  - Creutz Palace, Klosterstraße.

== Bibliography (in German) ==
- Hermann Heckmann, Baumeister des Barock und Rokoko. Brandenburg Preußen, Berlino 1998.
- Uwe Kieling, Berlin – Baumeister und Bauten, Berlin-Lipsia 1987, ISBN 3-350-00280-3.
- Ekhart Berckenhagen (1964). "Grael, Johann Friedrich Jacob". Neue Deutsche Biographie (NDB) (in German). VI. Berlino: Duncker & Humblot: 714.
