= Temnitztal =

- Municipality
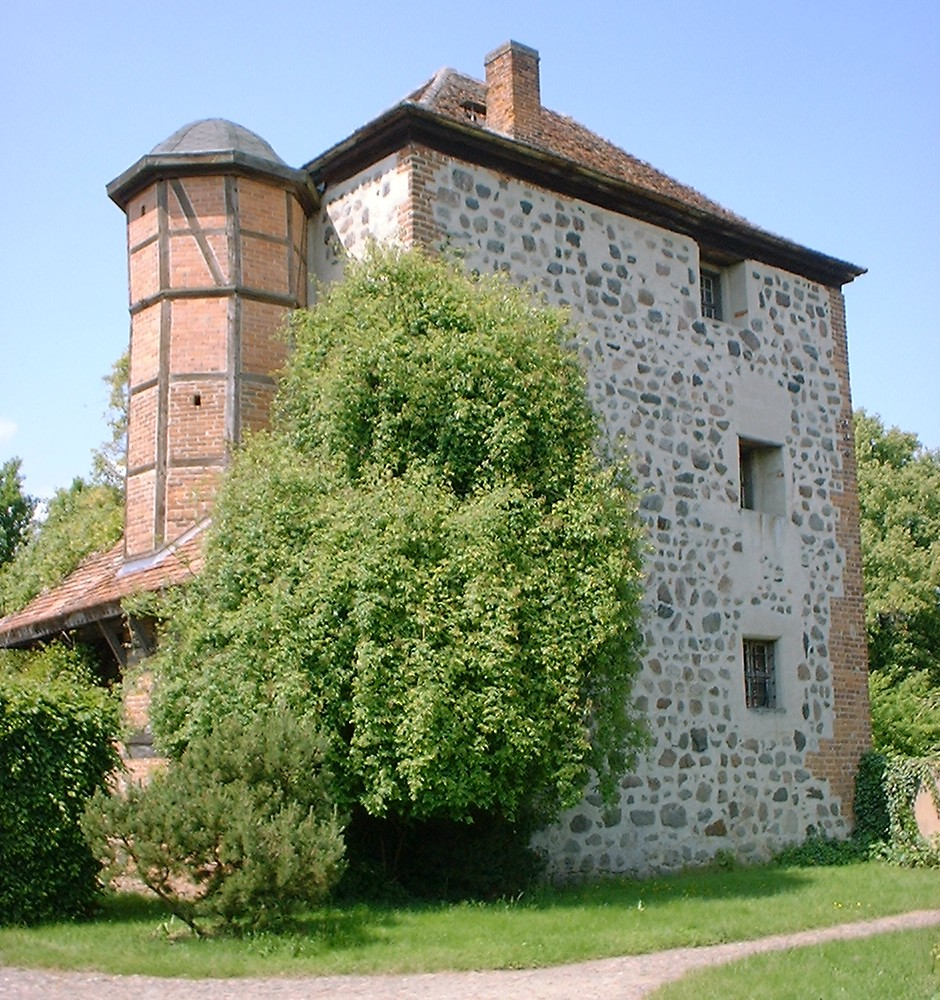
- Medieval Tower

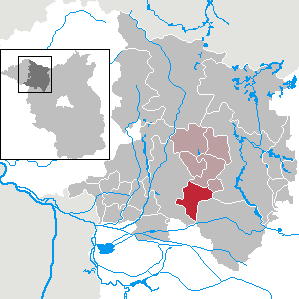
- Location of Temnitztal within Ostprignitz-Ruppin district
- Interactive map of Temnitztal
- Location within Germany Location within Brandenburg
- Coordinates: 52°52′39″N 12°37′50″E
- Country: Germany
- State: Brandenburg
- District: Ostprignitz-Ruppin
- Municipal assoc.: Temnitz
- Subdivisions: 6 Ortsteile: Garz, Kerzlin, Küdow-Lüchfeld, Rohrlack, Vichel (Temnitztal), Wildberg (Temnitztal)

Government
  - Mayor (2024–29): Michael Mann

Area
  - Total: 51.95 km^{2} (20.06 sq mi)
- Elevation: 38 m (125 ft)

Population (2025-12-31)
  - Total: 1,487
  - Density: 28.62/km^{2} (74.13/sq mi)
- Time zone: UTC+01:00 (CET)
  - Summer (DST): UTC+02:00 (CEST)
- Postal codes: 16845
- Dialling codes: 033928
- Vehicle registration: OPR

Temnitztal is a municipality in the Ostprignitz-Ruppin district, in Brandenburg, Germany.

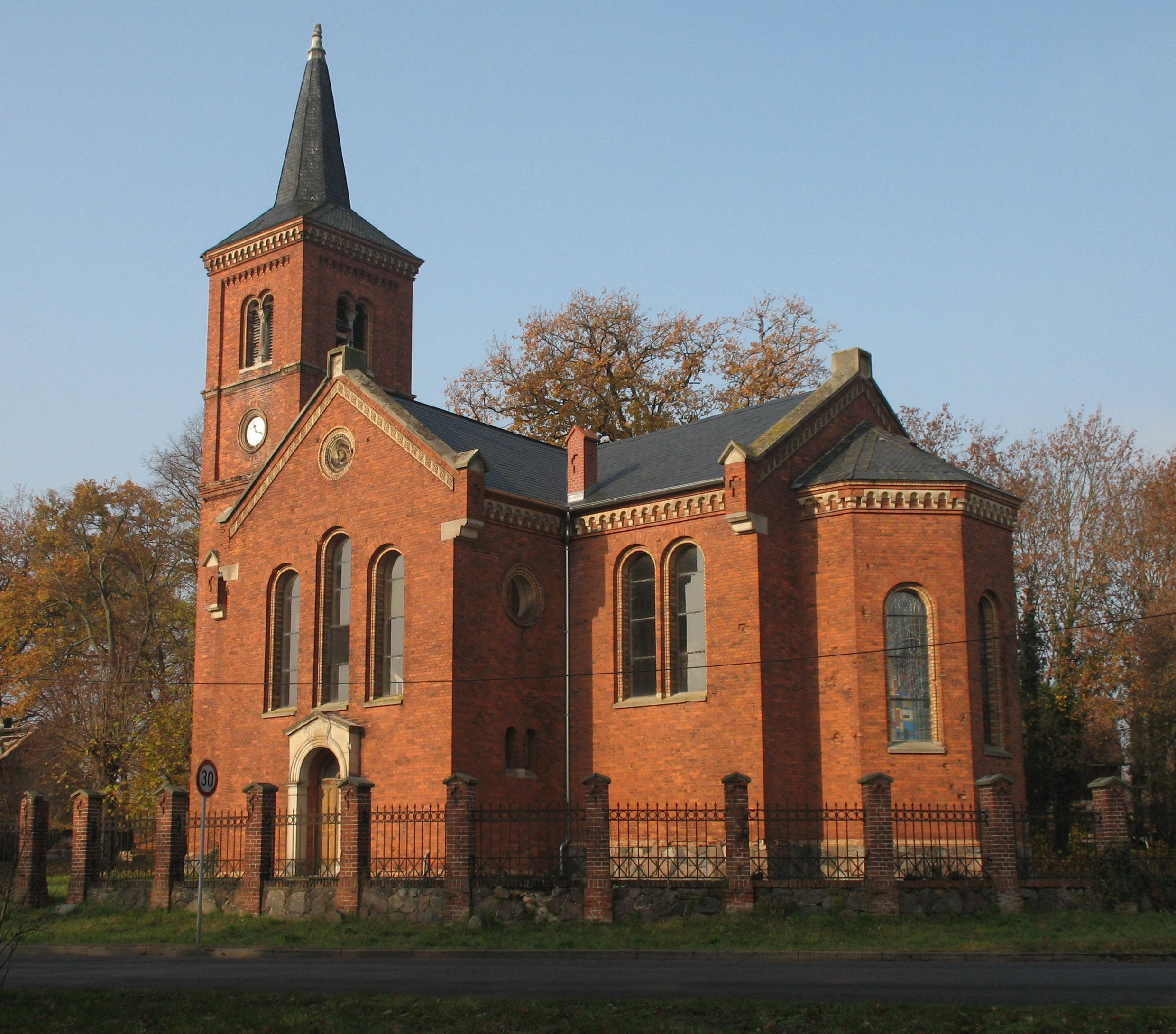
Church in Vichel

== Demography ==
Development of population since 1875 within the current boundaries (Blue line: Population; Dotted line: Comparison to population development of Brandenburg state; Grey background: Time of Nazi rule; Red background: Time of communist rule)

Temnitztal: Population development
within the current boundaries (2013)

Year	Pop.	±% p.a.
1875	2,518	—
1890	2,422	−0.26%
1910	2,145	−0.61%
1925	2,343	+0.59%
1933	2,228	−0.63%
1939	2,117	−0.85%
1946	3,631	+8.01%
1950	3,372	−1.83%
1964	2,262	−2.81%
1971	2,278	+0.10%
1981	1,963	−1.48%
1985	1,951	−0.15%
1989	1,903	−0.62%
1990	1,890	−0.68%
1991	1,850	−2.12%
1992	1,841	−0.49%
1993	1,850	+0.49%
1994	1,860	+0.54%
1995	1,839	−1.13%
1996	1,783	−3.05%

Year	Pop.	±% p.a.
1997	1,801	+1.01%
1998	1,787	−0.78%
1999	1,776	−0.62%
2000	1,761	−0.84%
2001	1,753	−0.45%
2002	1,734	−1.08%
2003	1,718	−0.92%
2004	1,704	−0.81%
2005	1,670	−2.00%
2006	1,655	−0.90%
2007	1,657	+0.12%
2008	1,615	−2.53%
2009	1,589	−1.61%
2010	1,547	−2.64%
2011	1,450	−6.27%
2012	1,456	+0.41%
2013	1,435	−1.44%
2014	1,410	−1.74%
2015	1,461	+3.62%
2016	1,460	−0.07%
