= Uckerland =

- Municipality
- Coat of arms

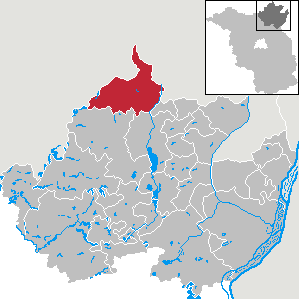
- Location of Uckerland within Uckermark district
- Interactive map of Uckerland
- Location within Germany Location within Brandenburg
- Coordinates: 53°27′N 13°48′E
- Country: Germany
- State: Brandenburg
- District: Uckermark
- Subdivisions: 11 Ortsteile

Government
  - Mayor (2016–24): Matthias Schilling (SPD)

Area
  - Total: 166.19 km^{2} (64.17 sq mi)
- Elevation: 82 m (269 ft)

Population (2025-12-31)
  - Total: 2,360
  - Density: 14.2/km^{2} (36.8/sq mi)
- Time zone: UTC+01:00 (CET)
  - Summer (DST): UTC+02:00 (CEST)
- Postal codes: 17337
- Dialling codes: 039745, 039753, 039752
- Vehicle registration: UM
- Website: www.uckerland.de

Uckerland (German pronunciation: [ˈʊkɐˌlant]) is a municipality in the Uckermark district, in Brandenburg, Germany.

Parts of Uckerland are villages:

- Fahrenholz with Lindhorst
- Güterberg with Carolinenthal
- Hetzdorf with Gneisenau, Kleisthöhe, Lemmersdorf and Schlepkow
- Jagow with Dolgen, Karlstein, Kutzerow, Lauenhof, Taschenberg und Uhlenhof
- Lübbenow
- Milow with Jahnkeshof
- Nechlin
- Trebenown with Bandelow, Neumannshof and Werbelow
- Wilsickow
- Wismar with Hansfelde
- Wolfshagen

== People ==
- Friedrich Wilhelm von Jagow (1771-1857), Prussian general

== Demography ==
Development of population since 1875 within the current Boundaries (Blue Line: Population; Dotted Line: Comparison to Population development in Brandenburg state; Grey Background: Time of Nazi Germany; Red Background: Time of communist East Germany)

Recent Population Development and Projections (Population Development before Census 2011 (blue line); Recent Population Development according to the Census in Germany in 2011 (blue bordered line); Official projections for 2005-2030 (yellow line); for 2017-2030 (scarlet line); for 2020-2030 (green line)

Uckerland: Population development
within the current boundaries (2020)

Year	Pop.	±% p.a.
1875	4,870	—
1890	4,845	−0.03%
1910	4,775	−0.07%
1925	5,624	+1.10%
1939	4,871	−1.02%
1950	8,085	+4.71%
1964	6,428	−1.62%

Year	Pop.	±% p.a.
1971	6,088	−0.77%
1981	4,703	−2.55%
1985	4,439	−1.43%
1990	4,293	−0.67%
1995	3,876	−2.02%
2000	3,746	−0.68%
2005	3,384	−2.01%

Year	Pop.	±% p.a.
2010	3,014	−2.29%
2015	2,740	−1.89%
2016	2,693	−1.72%
2017	2,664	−1.08%
2018	2,638	−0.98%
2019	2,579	−2.24%
2020	2,578	−0.04%

== Photogallery ==
Jagow

Alexander Duncker, 1863-1864
Wolfshagen

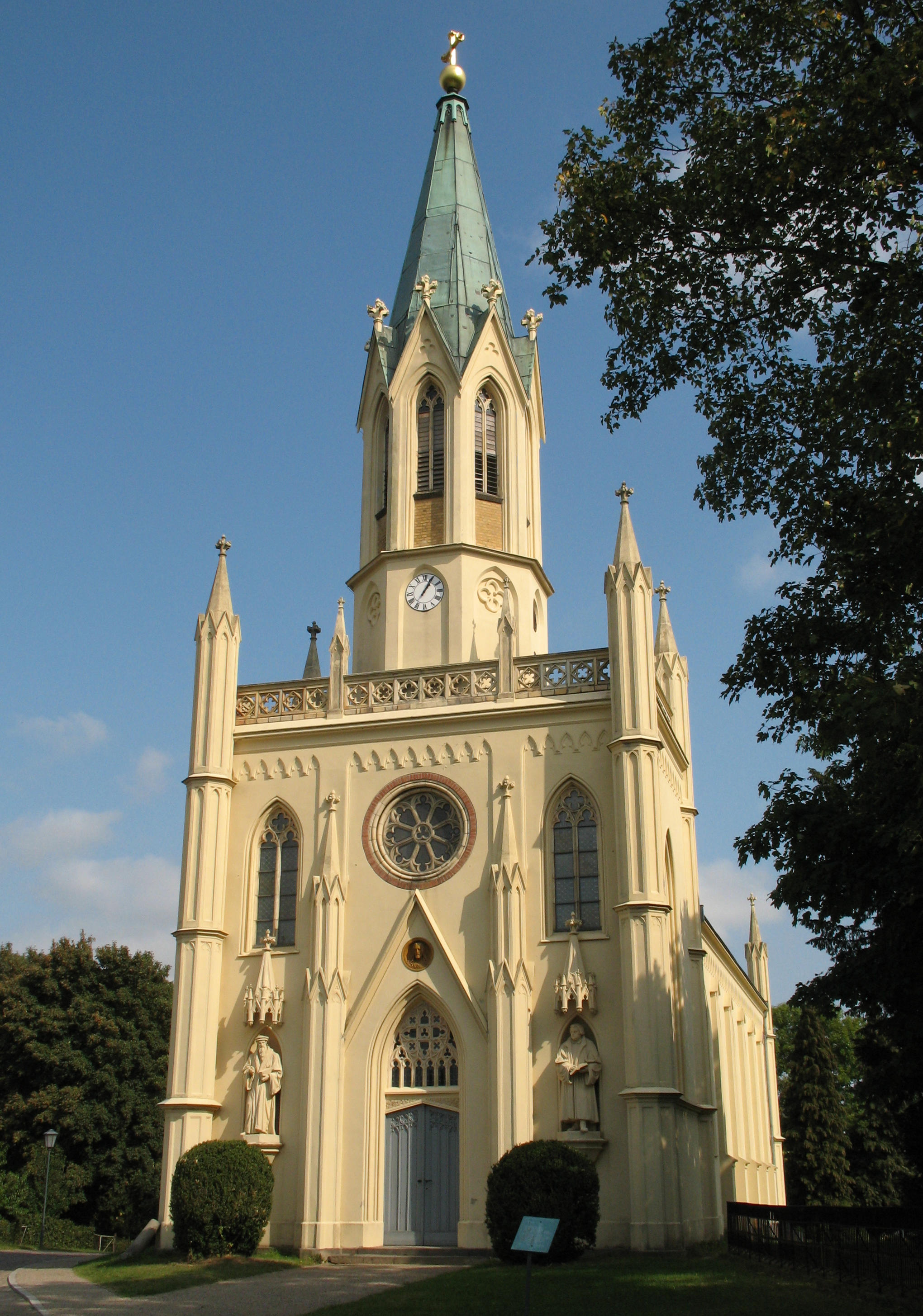
Church

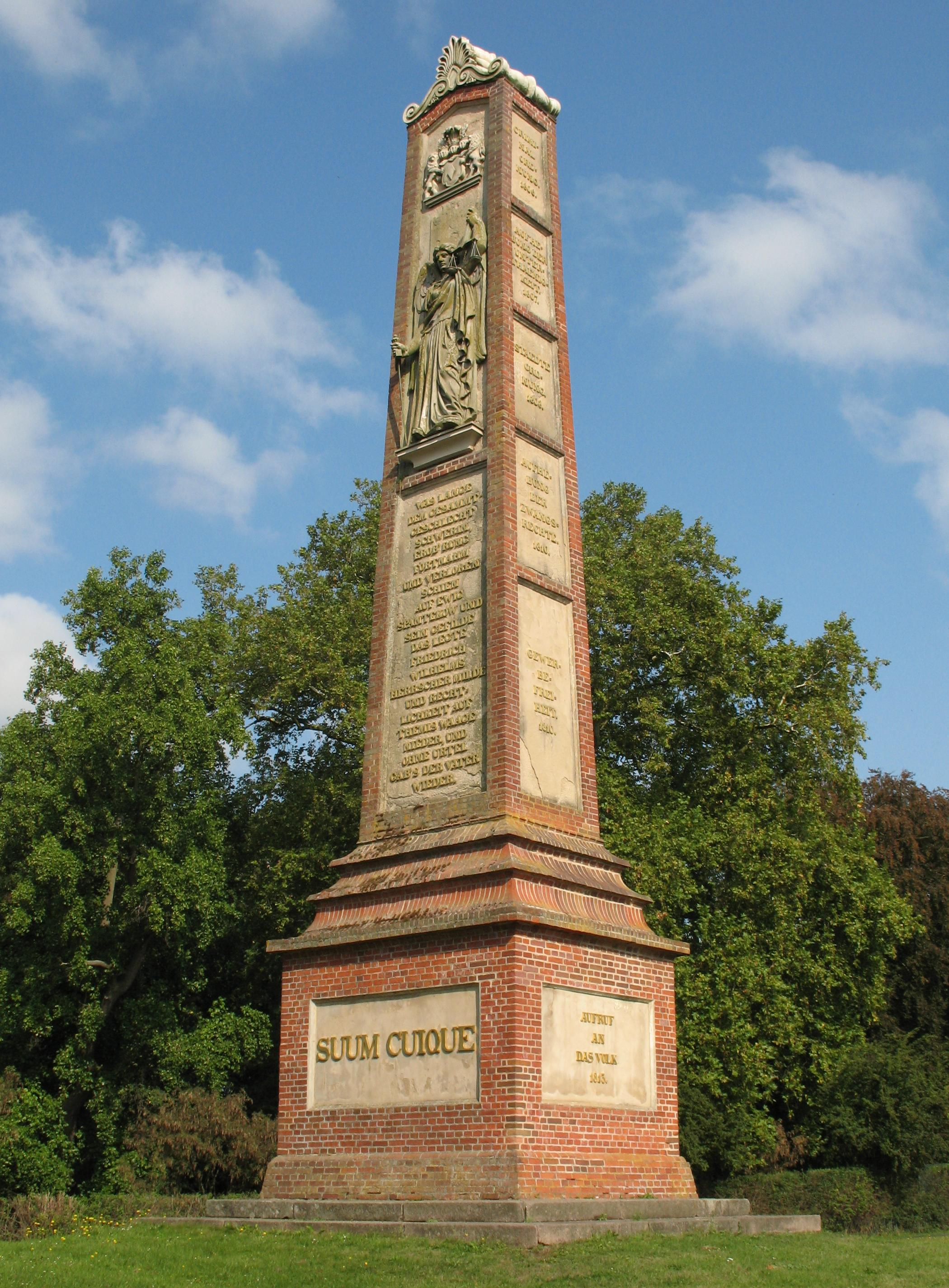
Monument in honour of King Frederick William III of Prussia

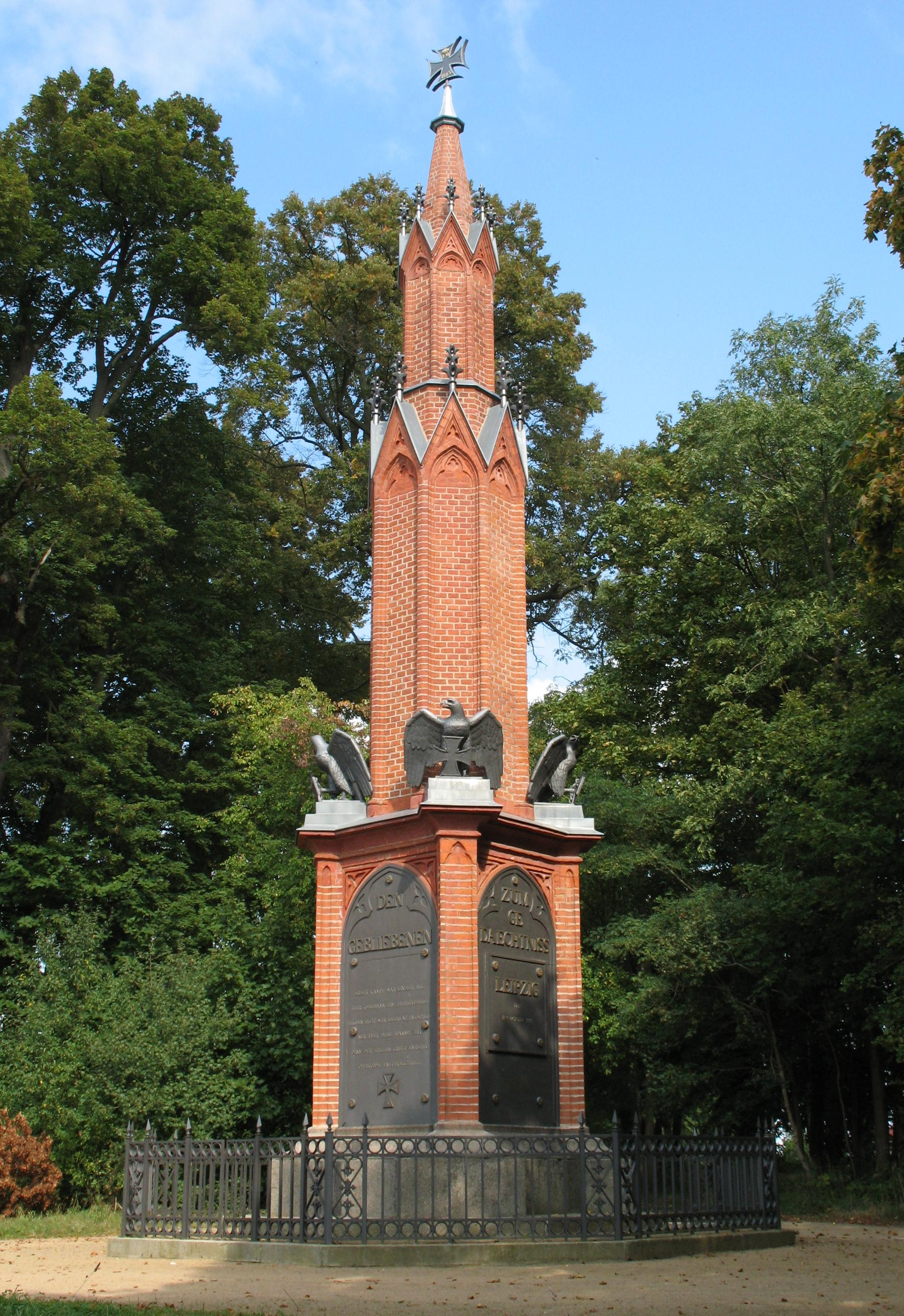
Napoleonic War memorial

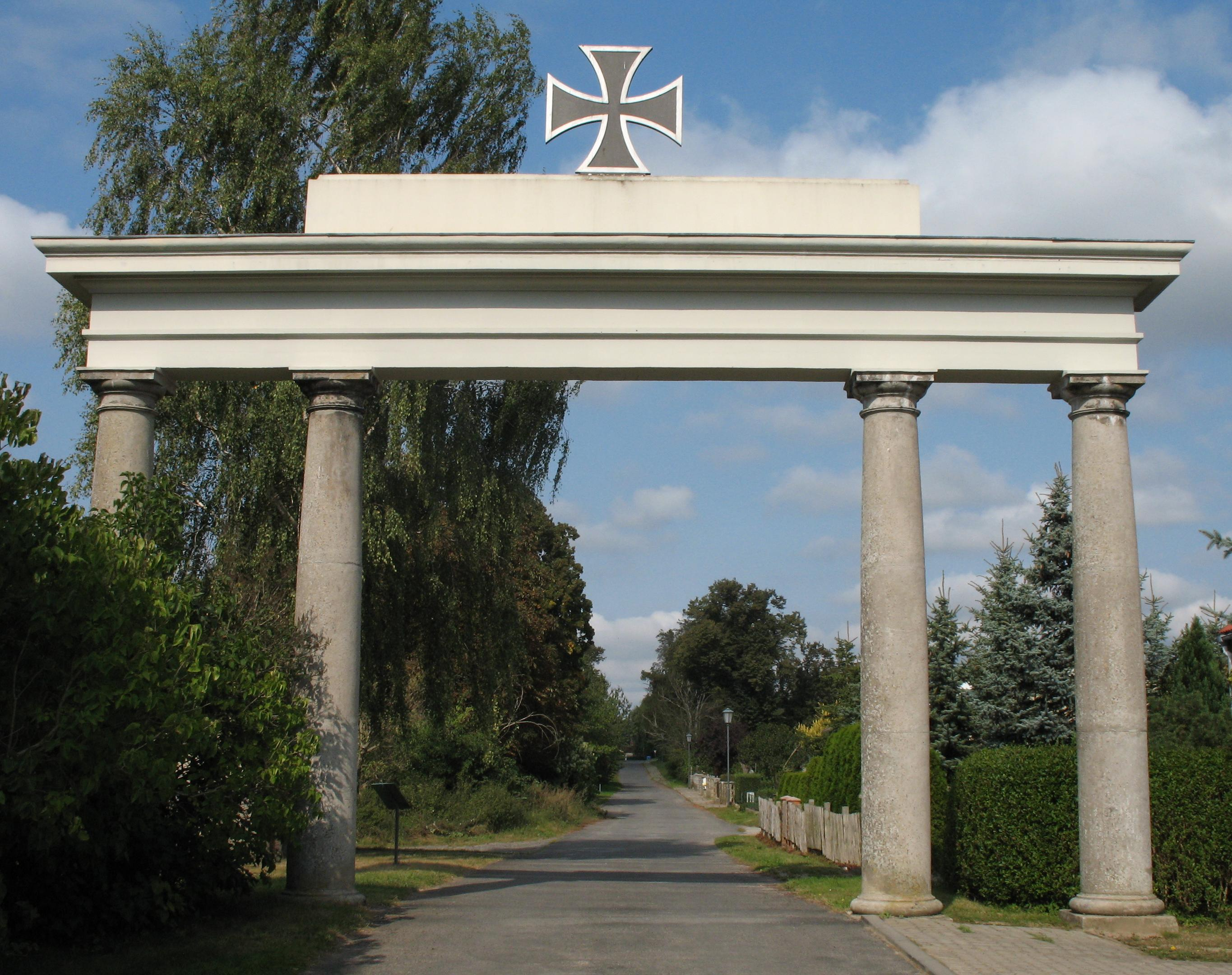
Gate

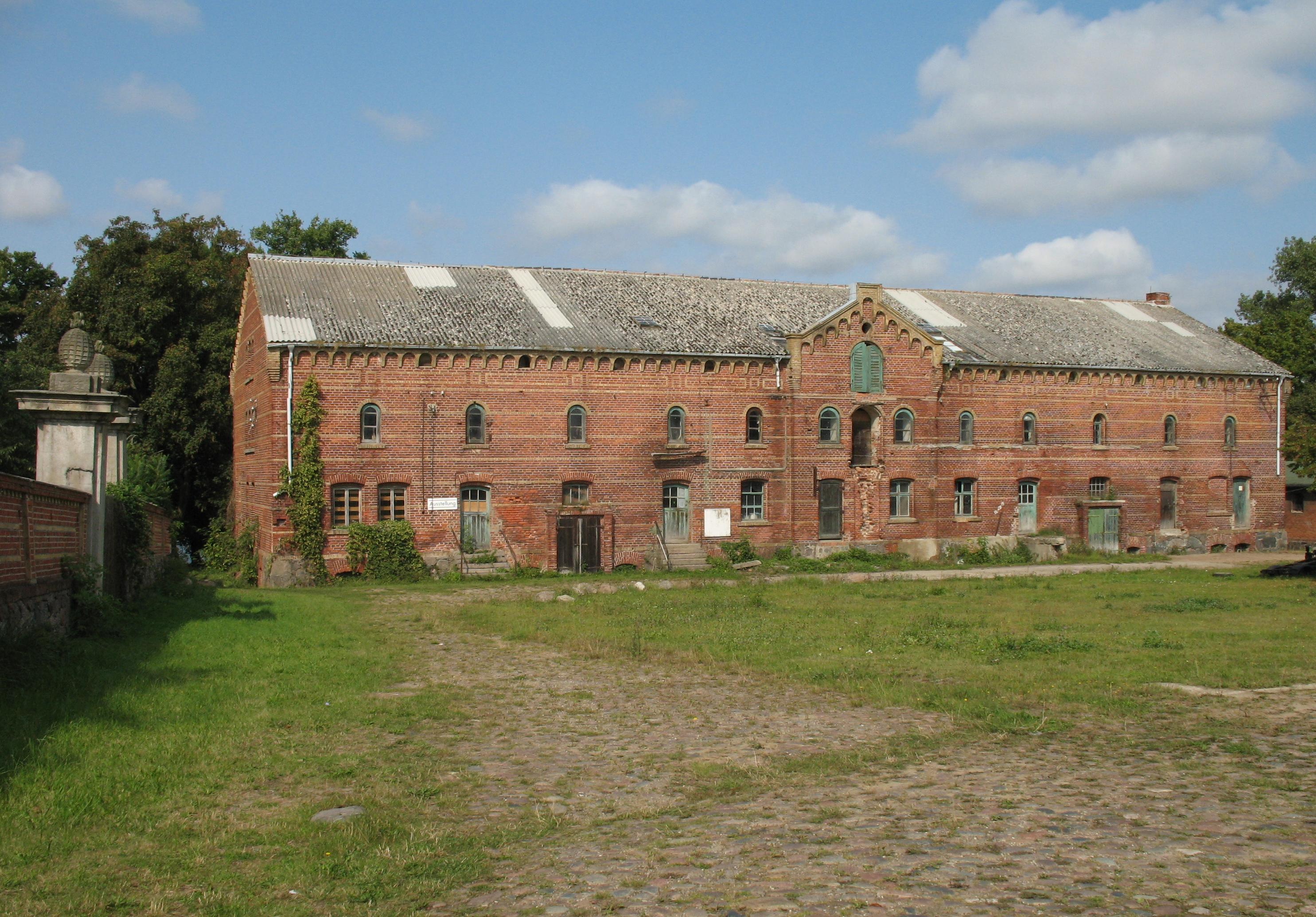
Storehouse

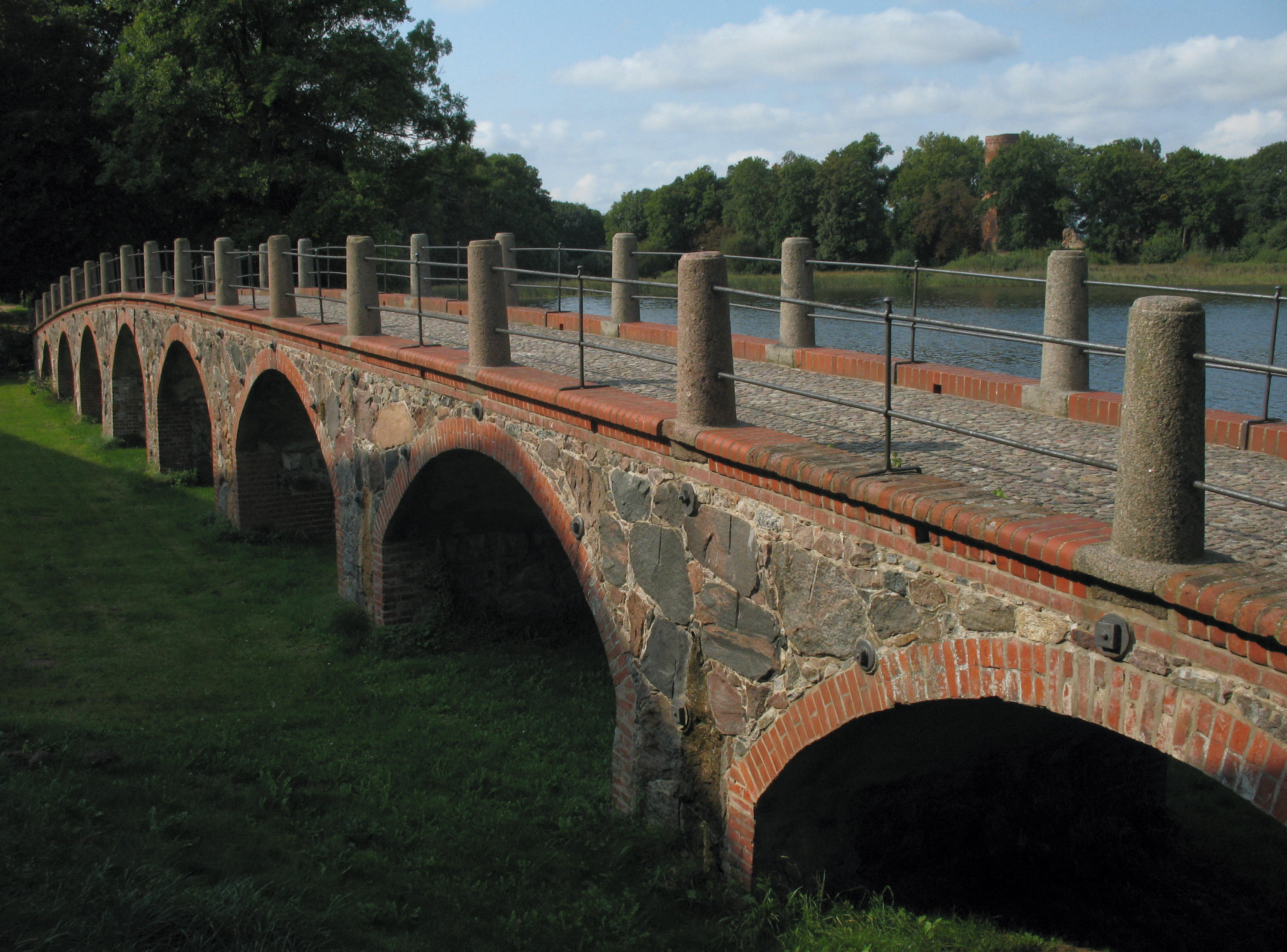
Bridge
