= St. Nicholas Church, Potsdam =

Lutheran church in Berlin, Germany

Coordinates: 52°23′47″N 13°03′39″E

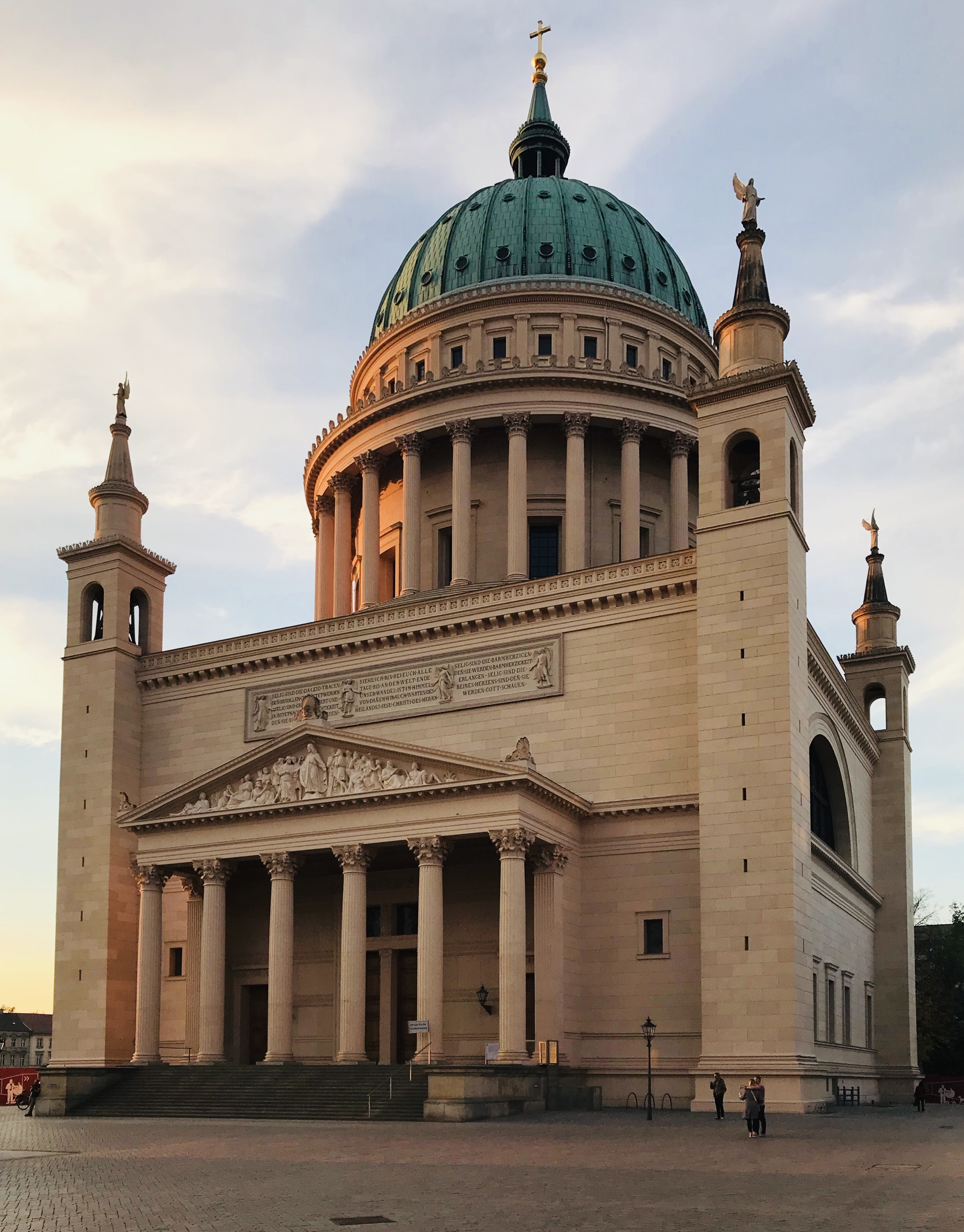
St. Nicholas Church in 2018

St. Nicholas Church (German: St. Nikolaikirche) in Potsdam is a Lutheran church under the Evangelical Church in Berlin, Brandenburg and Silesian Upper Lusatia of the Evangelical Church in Germany on the Old Market Square (Alter Markt) in Potsdam, Germany.

== Overview ==
The central plan building in the Classicist style and dedicated to Saint Nicholas was built to plans by Karl Friedrich Schinkel in the years 1830 to 1837. The tambour of the 77-metre-high church that towers above the roofs of the city was built later, from 1843 to 1850. Its construction was taken over by Ludwig Persius and, from 1845, Friedrich August Stüler.

Towards the end of the Second World War, the church was hit during the British air raid on Potsdam and subsequently badly damaged by Soviet artillery fire. After many years of rebuilding the church was re-consecrated in 1981 by the Evangelical Parish of St. Nicholas, Potsdam, and, today, is open to visitors. In addition to the normal church services, concert events are also held in the church.

== Earlier churches on the site ==
=== 13th to 17th centuries ===
Nothing is known about the first church in Potsdam, which dated to the 13th century and stood on the site of today's St. Nicholas Church. Charles IV's 'Landbuch' mentions an "ecclesia parochialis" (parish church) in the city in 1375. This includes a simple drawing of the church, showing it to be in a Romanesque basilica church with westwork across it, rebuilt as a three-aisle Gothic hall church in the 14th century. It was a daughter church of the Spandau ecclesiastical district, which provided pastoral care for the church in Potsdam until 1539, when the Protestant Reformation took root in the Margraviate of Brandenburg under Joachim II Hector.

After switching to Protestantism, the church was turned into a preaching hall by adding a pulpit. A Renaissance cupola was added to the Romanesque tower in 1563. The first ever evidence of the church's dedication is in a 1602 document calling it "St. Catherine's Church". Johann Gregor Memhardt depicted it in the oldest known view of Potsdam from 1672.

=== 18th century ===
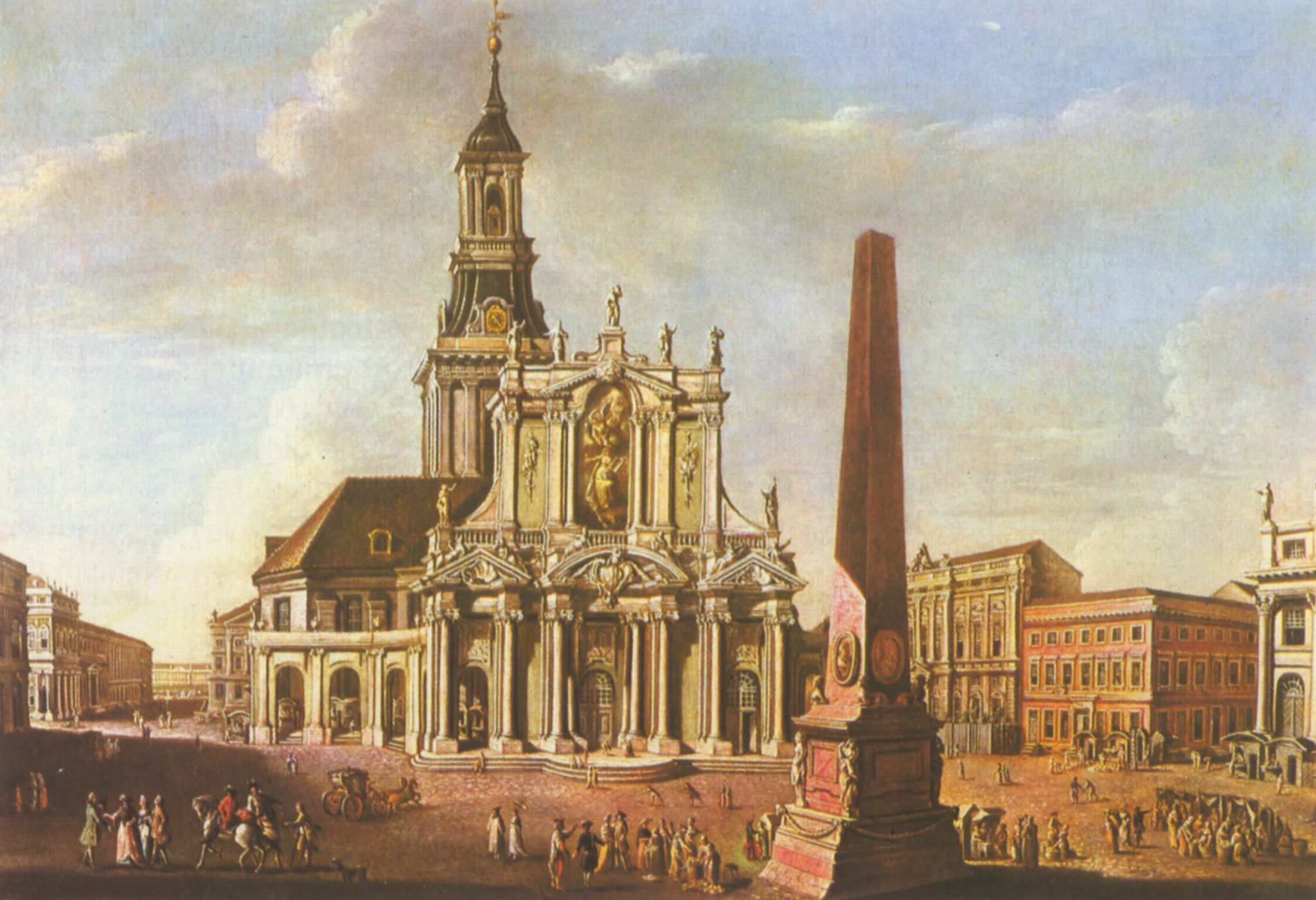
St. Nikolai with its ornamental facade - painting by Johann Friedrich Meyer, 1771

Frederick William began Potsdam's promotion into a second royal residence and this was continued from 1701 onwards by Frederick I of Prussia. Major urban expansion began in 1715 after the accession of Frederick William I of Prussia through an influx of craftsmen and by moving the king's lifeguard regiment to Potsdam.

St Catherine's Church proved too small for the burgeoning royal residence and garrison town and it was demolished in 1721 to build a new Baroque one. At Frederick William I's request the new building was instead dedicated to Nicholas of Myra. This was the first centrally-designed church in the city and it was built from 1721 to 1724 to designs by Philipp Gerlach. The plan was a Greek cross and its belltower on the north side was 89.14 m tall. Inside the vaulted wings were two-storied galleries, which became a hallmark of Protestant churches around that time - apart from Jesuit ones, Catholic churches did not have galleries in this form. The contemporary architectural historian Leonhard Christoph Sturm's treatise "Complete Instructions for Designing All Types of Churches" argued that:

a large number of people [...] should be able to hear and see the priest well. Since this cannot be achieved on the ground, one must try to gain space by arranging people one above the other".

The Soldier King also built two other churches on the same principles - in 1726-1728 the Heiligengeistkirche with an 86-metre-high tower and in 1730-1735 the Garrison Church with an 88.4-metre-high tower.

Frederick William I, who was not particularly concerned with ostentation, aimed for economical and functional construction when expanding his garrison town. His son and successor, Frederick the Great, wanted to enhance Potsdam's outward appearance and had simple houses fitted with showy facades, soon dubbed "front-dresses" by the inhabitants, giving some of them a palatial look. Frederick envisioned turning the Alter Mark (beside St. Nikolai, the Potsdam City Palace, the Altes Rathaus and a number of bourgeois houses) into an Italian piazza. He gave St. Nikolai a new south-facing facade towards the Alter Markt. A smaller-scale copy of the facade of Santa Maria Maggiore in Rome was added to the front of the church between 1752 and 1755 under the direction of the architects Jan Bouman and Carl Ludwig Hildebrandt (c. 1720–1770), based on drawings by Georg Wenzeslaus von Knobelsdorff and in late Roman Baroque style with several finials and columns. The upper part of the centre of that west front was decorated with a fresco by the painter Charles-Amédée-Philippe van Loo and its sculptures were largely created in the workshops of Johann Peter Benkert and Gottlieb Heymüller. Arcades, which housed market stalls, surrounded the nave.

During repair work on the tower the whole church burned down on 3 September 1795 due to the careless use of a soldering torch, though the show-facade survived. The following year the ruins were demolished and the stones used for various purposes, including to build the Barracks Playhouse. The show-facade was also demolished in 1811. Services for the parish were held in the Heiligengeistkirche, then from 1806 in the Garrison Church and from 1810 back in the Heiligengeistkirche.

== Architecture ==
=== Interior ===
==== Cupola ====
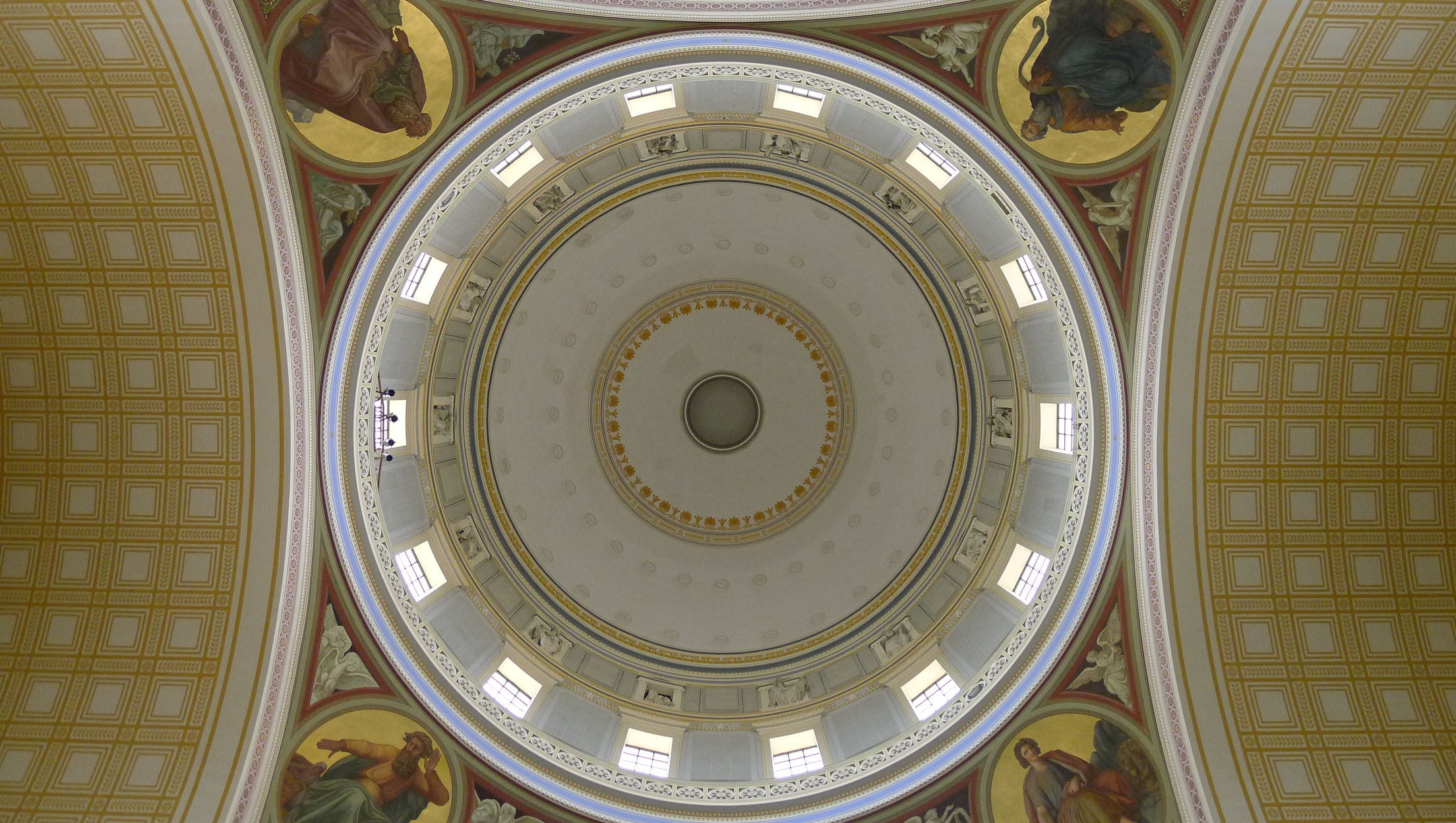
Interior cupola

== Bibliography (in German) ==
- Dietmar Beuchtel, Ursula Treichel: St. Nikolai in Potsdam. DKV-Kunstführer. Vol. 424,9. Deutscher Kunstverlag, Munich - Berlin 1999 (3rd ed.).
- Gemeindekirchenrat der Ev. St. Nikolai-Kirchen-Gemeinde Potsdam (ed.): St. Nikolai Potsdam. 150 Jahre unter der Kuppel. UNZE, Teltow 2000.
- Kuratorium der Nikolaikirche (Hrg.): St. Nikolai Potsdam - ein Rückblick anläßlich der Wiedereinweihung 1981. Potsdam 1981, W. Kreutzmann, Leipzig 1989.
- F. Wilhelm Riehl: Die St. Nikolai-Kirche in Potsdam, ihre Geschichte und gegenwärtige Gestalt. Mit einem Grundrisse der Kirche. Potsdam 1850.
- Waltraud Volk: Potsdam. Historische Straßen und Plätze heute. Verlag für Bauwesen, Berlin - Munich, 1993 (3rd ed.). ISBN 3-345-00488-7
- Atlas zur Zeitschrift für Bauwesen. Jg. III, Berlin 1853 Tafeln 1ff. Download at Central and State Library of Berlin

== See also ==
- Day of Potsdam
