= Prince Henry Palace =

Coordinates: 52°31′5″N 13°23′36″E

Main facade.

The Prince Henry Palace (German - Palais des Prinzen Heinrich or Prinz-Heinrich-Palais) is a building at 6 Unter den Linden in the Mitte district of Berlin. It was built between 1748 and 1753 by Frederick the Great for his younger brother Prince Henry of Prussia to Frederician Rococo designs by Johann Boumann, said to have been based on original designs by Georg Wenzeslaus von Knobelsdorff.

In 1809 it was converted into a university. It burned down during the Second World War and then was restored between 1947 and 1962. Since then it has been the main building of the Humboldt University of Berlin. Sculptures on loan from the Potsdamer Stadtschloss have been displayed on the side wings since 1967 - their return is still a matter of discussion.

== History ==
=== Palace ===
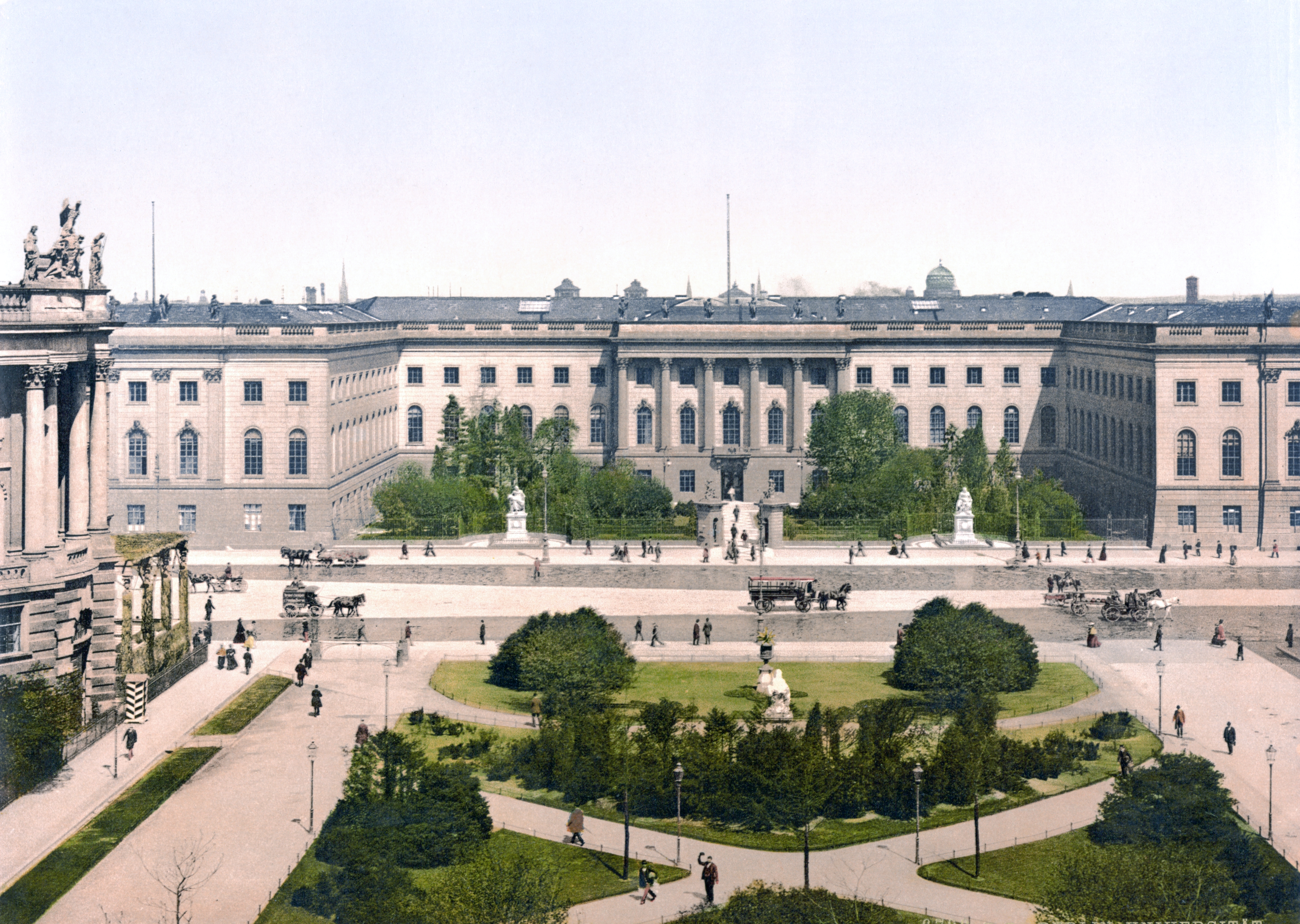
View across the Opernplatz towards the palace, c.1900

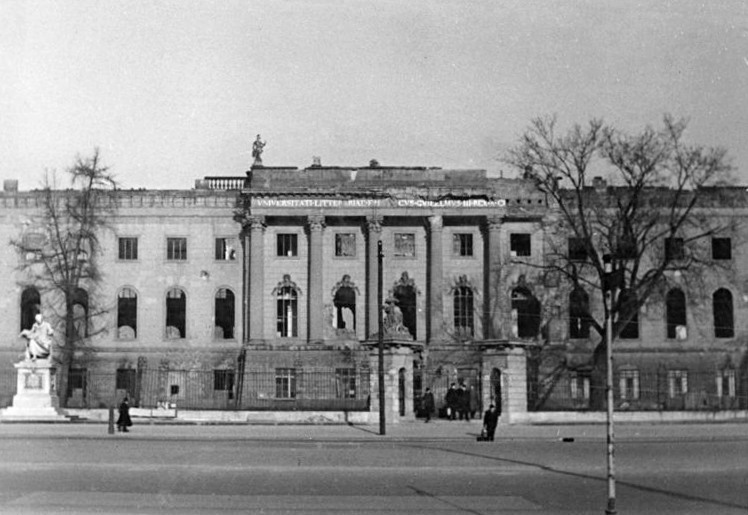
The war-damaged palace, 1950

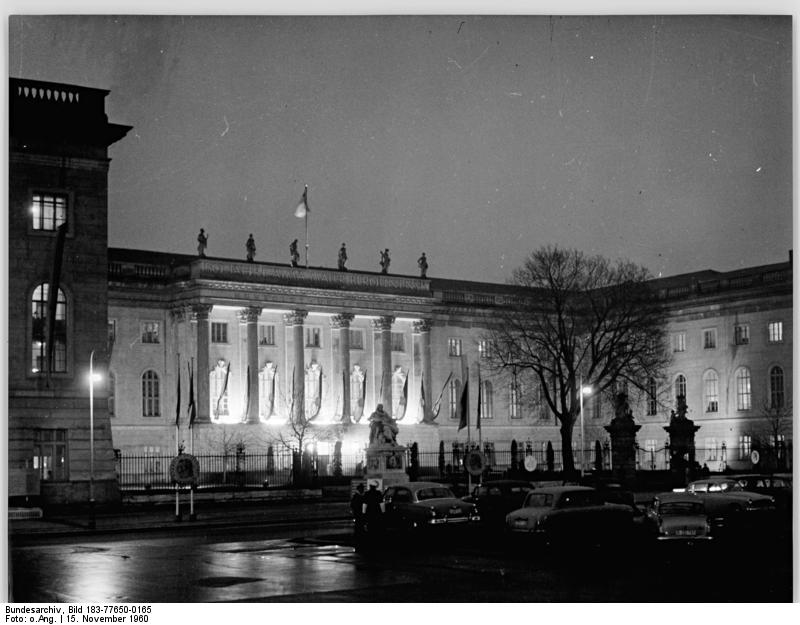
Festive lighting to mark the university's 150th anniversary, 1960

Knobelsdorff was originally supposed to build a sprawling palace for Frederick himself on the site as part of a larger complex to be known as the Forum Fridericianum or 'Palais du Roy' (King's Palace). The king tried to buy the existing palace of the margraves of Brandenburg-Schwedt (the forerunner of today's Old Palace) to demolish it and build a large forum on the site, but they refused to sell and so he instead refurnished his existing residence in the Berliner Schloss and concentrated his architectural schemes on Potsdam.

However, the Royal Opera House had already been built to Knobelsdorff's designs on the empty strip of land and needed framing, so Frederick provided preliminary sketches for such a building, unusually large for a young unmarried prince. As Gutzkow states:

The ‘little chestnut grove’ was formerly called the ‘chestnut forest’. The endearing diminutive is only the result of a significant clearing of its venerable, old trunks. His Royal Highness Prince Henry supported his royal brother’s building ambitions. He built his colossal structure, formerly called ‘Prince Henry’s Palace’, in an area still covered with woods and meadows.

At the same time St. Hedwig's Cathedral (1773) and the Royal Library (1775-1786) were built opposite, effectively adding up to a highly-curtailed version of the Forum.

The design of the facade was based on that of the Opera House to give the square a unified appearance. Boumann initially oversaw construction himself, before handing over to Carl Ludwig Hildebrandt in 1755 after Boumann was put in charge of all building projects in Berlin. By 1755 the palace's construction costs totalled 200,000 thaler, with another 33,000 thaler allocated in 1756, enormous sums for a project of this kind at that time. Work was slow and during the Seven Years' War even stopped completely. Only early in 1766 could Henry, his wife Wilhelmine von Hessen-Kassel and his court move in. He lived there, in Schloss Rheinsberg or apartments in the Potsdam Stadtschloss until his death in 1802 and his widow remained in the palace until her death six years later, albeit in separate apartments in the two outer wings.

=== University ===
In 1809 the University of Berlin was founded and Frederick William III granted the palace to it. From 1836 to 1846 and again in 1892 its interior was adapted to its new role. Its students included Karl Marx, who studied there under Georg Wilhelm Friedrich Hegel

From 1913 to 1920 Berlin's building commissioner Ludwig Hoffmann extended it by lengthening the two side wings in the same style and at the same height, as well as adding extra side buildings, turning it from a U shape to the present H shape. Much of the building was destroyed in the Second World War, particularly by the Allied bombing raids between 24 November 1943 and 19 July 1944. Only a few interiors, such as a stairwell in the eastern end wing, remained in their original condition.

Teaching resumed in 1945, initially in some provisionally repaired rooms in the west wing. The Frederician facades were reconstructed in two phases, from 1947 to 1954 and from 1958 to 1962, based on historical models. Inside the central section, a large vestibule was created on the Unter den Linden side, and a grand staircase on the garden side, featuring wall and floor elements of reddish marble. This sequence of spaces is among the most important examples of 1950s socialist classicism. The 1958-1962 phase also included the construction of a cinema and main lecture hall with colourful stained-glass windows by Walter Womacka, both on the east wing on Dorotheenstrasse.

Marx being an alumnus of the University meant that it held particular significance for East Germany's state and party leadership and explains why a quotation from Marx's eleventh thesis on Feuerbach ("The philosophers have only interpreted the world in various ways; the point, however, is to change it.") was inscribed in gold lettering in the central stairwell. They also put up the inscription "HUMBOLDT UNIVERSITAET" to replace the previous Latin one which translated as "of the scientific university, [set up by] King Frederick William III in the year 1809".

The University Palace has been a listed building since 1975 and was most recently renovated inside and out in 2020 at a cost of 43 million euros.

== Sculptures ==
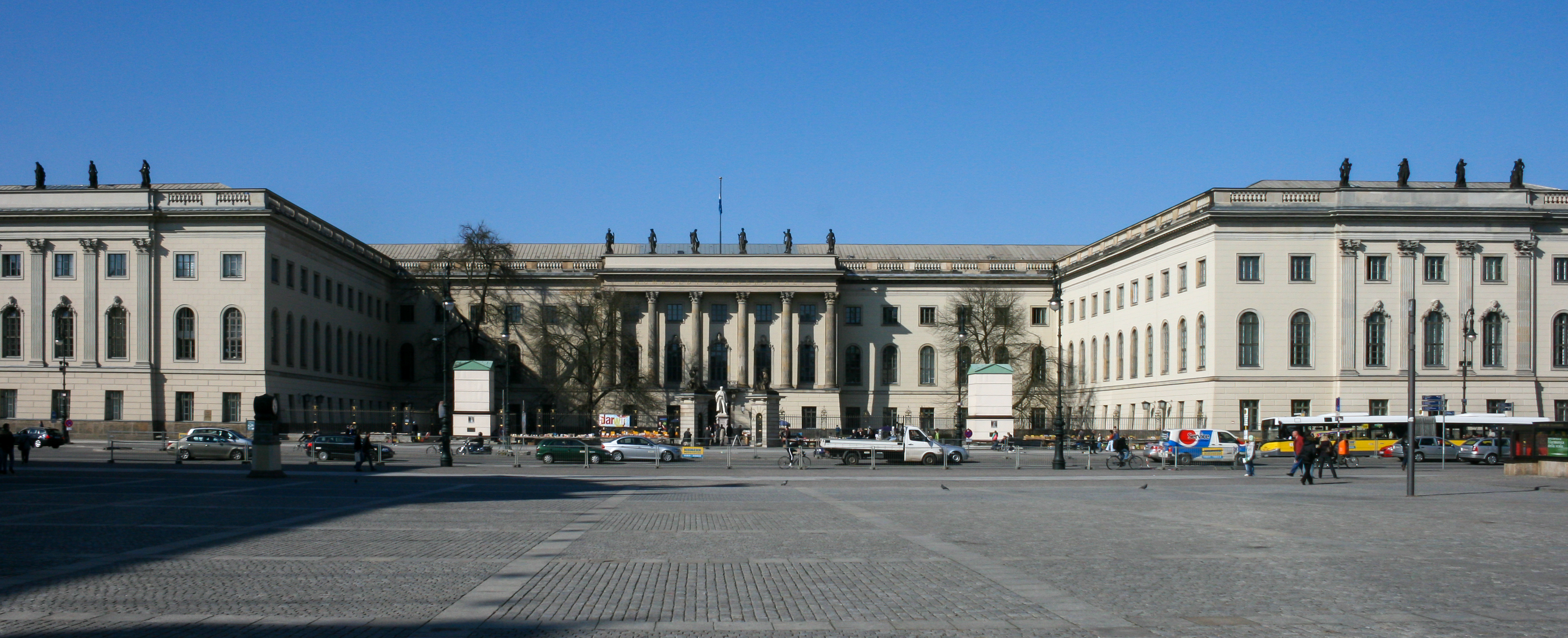
View of the original figures on the central section and the loaned figures on the side wings.

The attic sculptures were carved by Gottlieb Heymüller around 1753 are related to use of the palace, Prince Henry's life and the Metamorphoses by Ovid. Sculptures of couples filled the middle avant-corps - Jason and Medea, Peleus and Thetis and Atalanta and Meleager. These were destroyed in the Second World War and replaced with reconstructions by Albert Braun in 1953 during the reconstruction of the building. The east and west wings had further couples - on the east Adonis and Venus and Perseus and Andromeda and on the west Bacchus and Ariadne and Mercury and Herse. All these were also destroyed in the Second World War and in 1967 sculptures from the Potsdam City Palace.

Since the City Palace was rebuilt as the Landtag of Brandenburg, the Potsdam Palace Association has been demanding that the loaned sculptures be returned in accordance with Article 8 of the Venice Charter, which reads "Works of sculpture, painting, or decorative ornamentation that are an integral part of a monument may not be separated from it, unless doing so is the only way to ensure their preservation". They point to their poor condition, the fact that they are the wrong size for their current context and they do not have any link to the Prince Henry Palace before the loan, calling them "looted art".

Their return is also demanded by Mitteschön (a local citizens' initiative), Annette Ahme (a writer on Berlin's history), Steeven Bretz (the CDU's general secretary for Brandenburg), Uwe Lehmann-Brauns (the CDU's cultural expert for Berlin), the lawyer Erardo Rautenberg and the publicist Lea Rosh. The university, the Berlin State Monuments Council and the Prussian Palaces and Gardens Foundation Berlin-Brandenburg have all opposed the calls for return, citing the Prince Henry Palace's existing protected status in its historically developed form, to which the sculptures belong.

== Bibliography (in German) ==
- Klaus-Dietrich Gandert: Vom Prinzenpalais zur Humboldt-Universität. Berlin 2004.

== External links (in German) ==
- "Berliner Landesdenkmalliste entry".
- Zerstörungen des Zweiten Weltkriegs: Hauptgebäude der Universität
- Die Attikaskulpturen – Humboldt-Universität zu Berlin
- 57. Sitzung Stadt Forum Potsdam: „Stadtschlossfiguren – Stand der Debatte und weiteres Vorgehen“ – Landeshauptstadt Potsdam
