= Johann Mayer =

Johann Mayer may refer to:

- Johann Tobias Mayer (1752–1830), German physicist
- Johann Mayer (serial killer) (1886–1923), German serial killer
- Johann Christoph Andreas Mayer (1747–1801), German anatomist
- Johann Friedrich Mayer (theologian) (1650–1712), German Lutheran theologian and professor of theology
- Johann Friedrich Mayer (agriculturist) (1719–1798), German Reformed pastor and agricultural reformer
- Johann Prokop Mayer (1737–1804), Austrian naturalist and botanist
- Johann Friedrich Meyer (1705–1765), German chemist
- Johann Friedrich von Meyer (1772–1849), German translator, politician, and senator of Frankfurt
- Johann Georg Meyer (1813–1886), German painter
- Johann Heinrich Meyer (1760–1832), Swiss painter, engraver and art critic
- Johann Heinrich Meyer (publisher) (1812–1863), German bookseller and publisher
- Johann Heinrich Gustav Meyer (1816–1877), German landscape architect and garden historian
- Johann Jakob Meyer (1798–1826), Swiss editor and journalist

== See also ==
- Johannes Mayer (1893–1963), German general
- Johannes Meyer (disambiguation)
