= Altes Rathaus (Potsdam) =

Building in Potsdam, Germany

Coordinates: 52°23′45.65″N 13°3′42.9″E

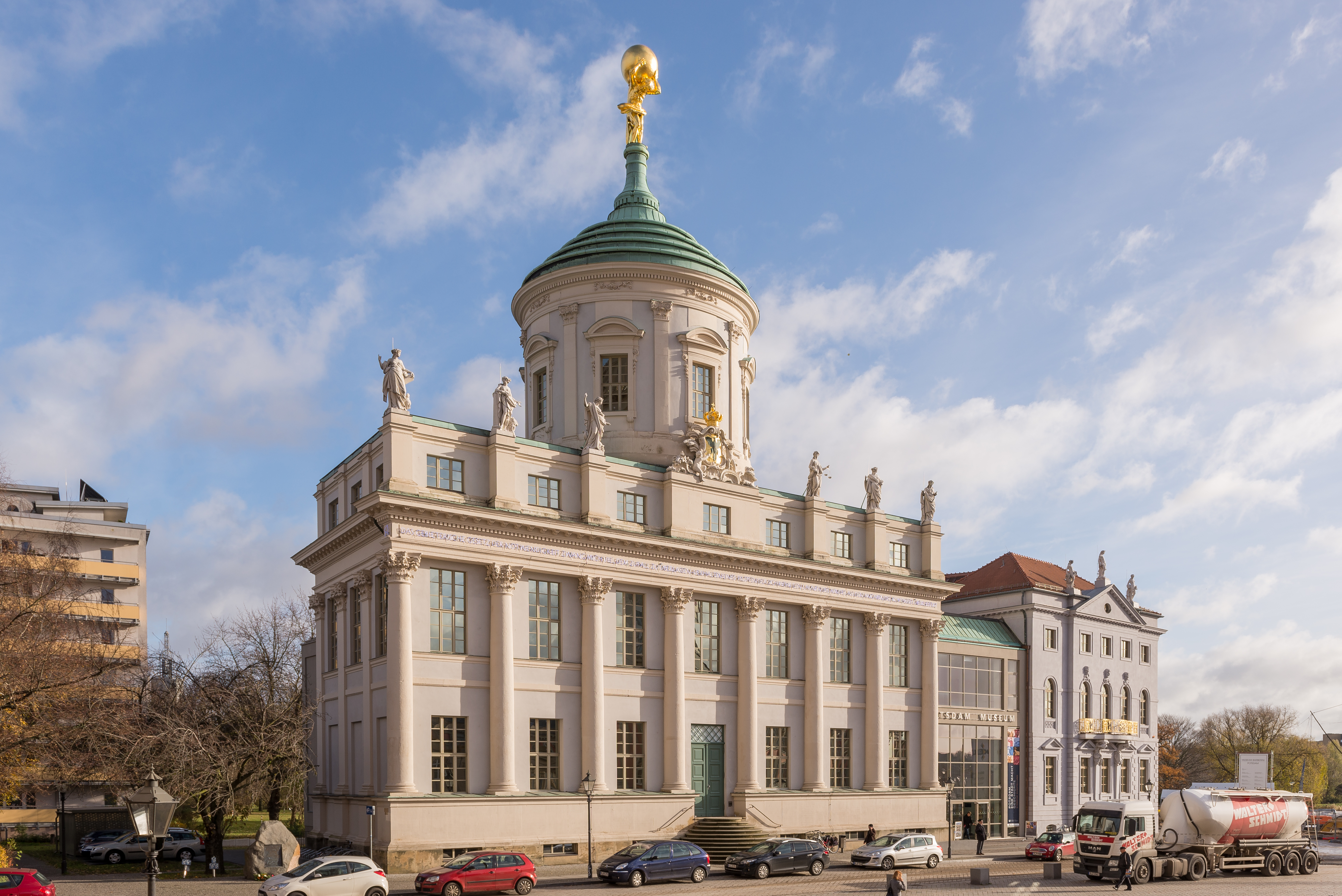

The Alte Rathaus is a Palladian building in the Old Market Square in Potsdam. It was built for Frederick the Great between 1753 and 1755 to designs by Johann Boumann and Carl Ludwig Hildebrandt. It was modelled on the Palazzo Angarano in Vicenza, designed by Andrea Palladio but never built. It was damaged by the 1945 air raid on Potsdam and rebuilt between 1961 and 1966. It has housed the Potsdam Museum.

== History ==
=== Context ===
Since the Middle Ages Potsdam's Alte Markt has had a town hall, probably standing in the centre of the Markt, which then extended further east. However, its position is comparable to that of the current Altes Rathaus. Its structure was completely rebuilt several times, both due to damage and to increase the city's prestige. The first town hall dated to 1524 but was burned down completely on 24 June 1536 during one of the worst fires in the city's history. Another town hall was built on the same site.

In 1720-1722, under Frederick William I of Prussia, the third town hall was built on the same site as the second to designs by Peter de Gayette. This was a timber-framed building with a solid facade and a wooden tower. Two east-facing wings housed stalls rented to merchants and the scales for checking goods arriving in the city before they could be offered for sale in the Alte Markt. It proved too small right from the outset and - though renovations in 1736 and at other times slightly alleviated this - damage to the building's structure became apparent over time. It was then demolished under Frederick the Great to build the fourth town hall.

=== The new building ===
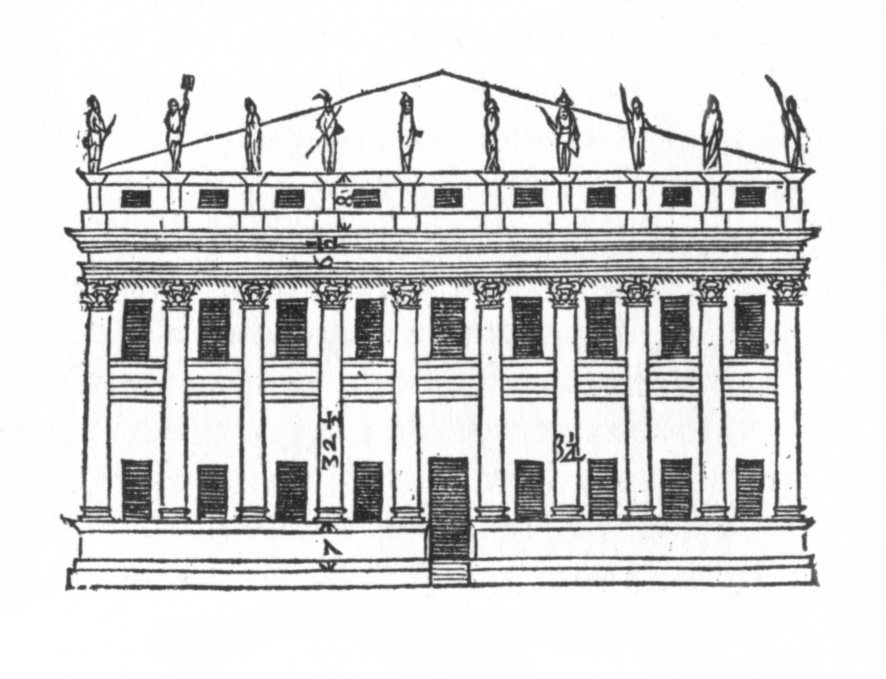
Andrea Palladio: Design for the Palazzo Angarano in Vicenza (1564)

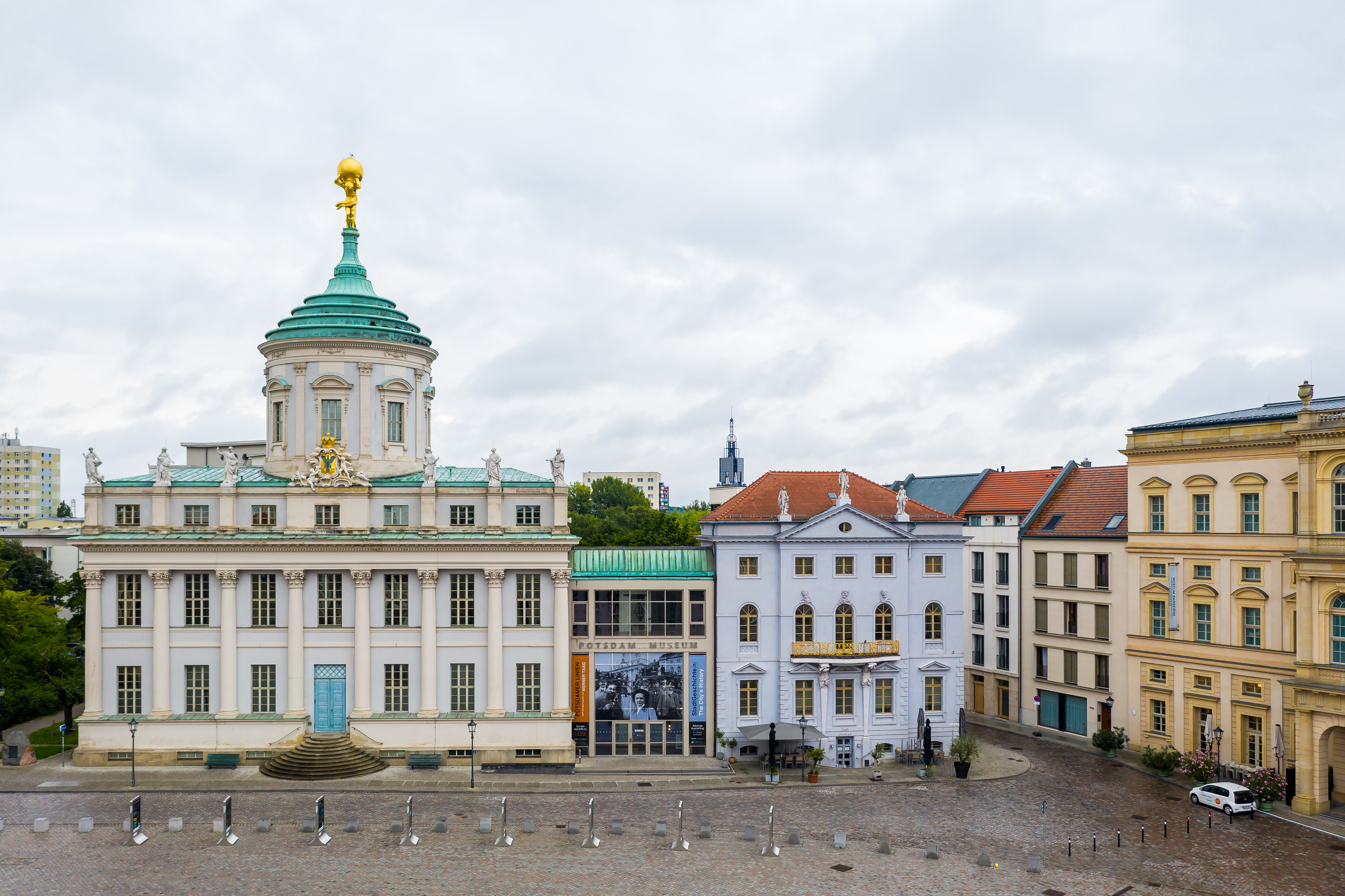
Altes Rathaus, the former Kulturhaus and Lehmannsches Haus (2023)

As with other buildings in Potsdam, it was modelled on Italian Baroque architecture. Frederick the Great wanted to upgrade the Alte Markt into an ancient Roman forum as part of his transformation of the city into a prestigious royal residence. Following the completion of the renovation of Potsdam City Palace and the start of the work on the new gateway facade for the Nikolaikirche, the new town hall was commissioned on the same stie as the other three by Frederick the Great in 1753. Frederick also provided ideas, though the actual plans by Johann Boumann and Christian Ludwig Hildebrandt. Boumann had played a significant part in designing Potsdam's Dutch Quarter and later became head of all building projects in Berlin and Potsdam.

=== 19th century rebuild ===
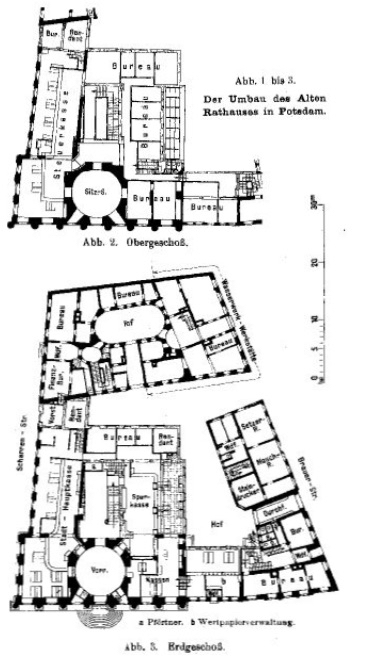
Plan of the building, 1922

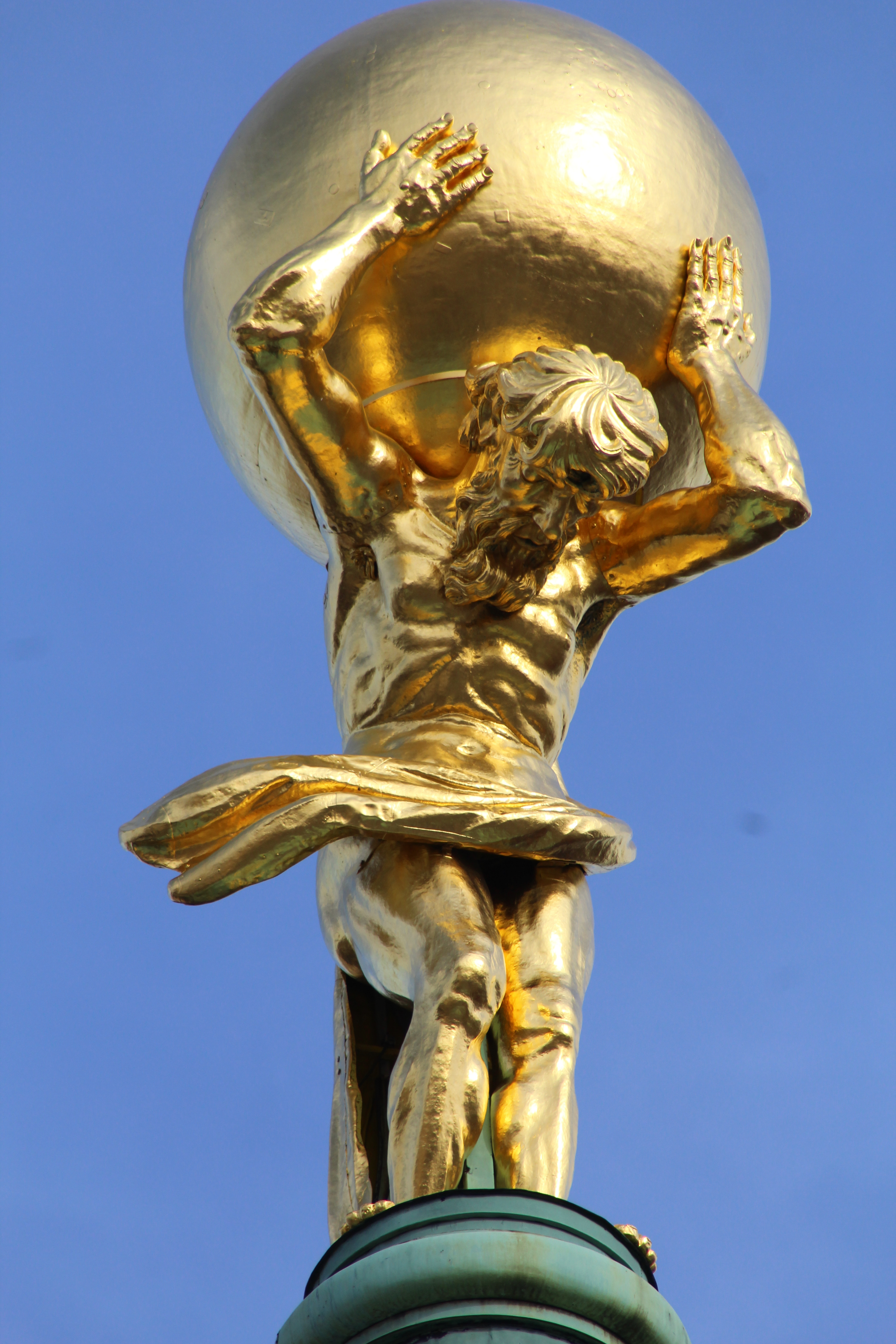
The new gilded Atlas

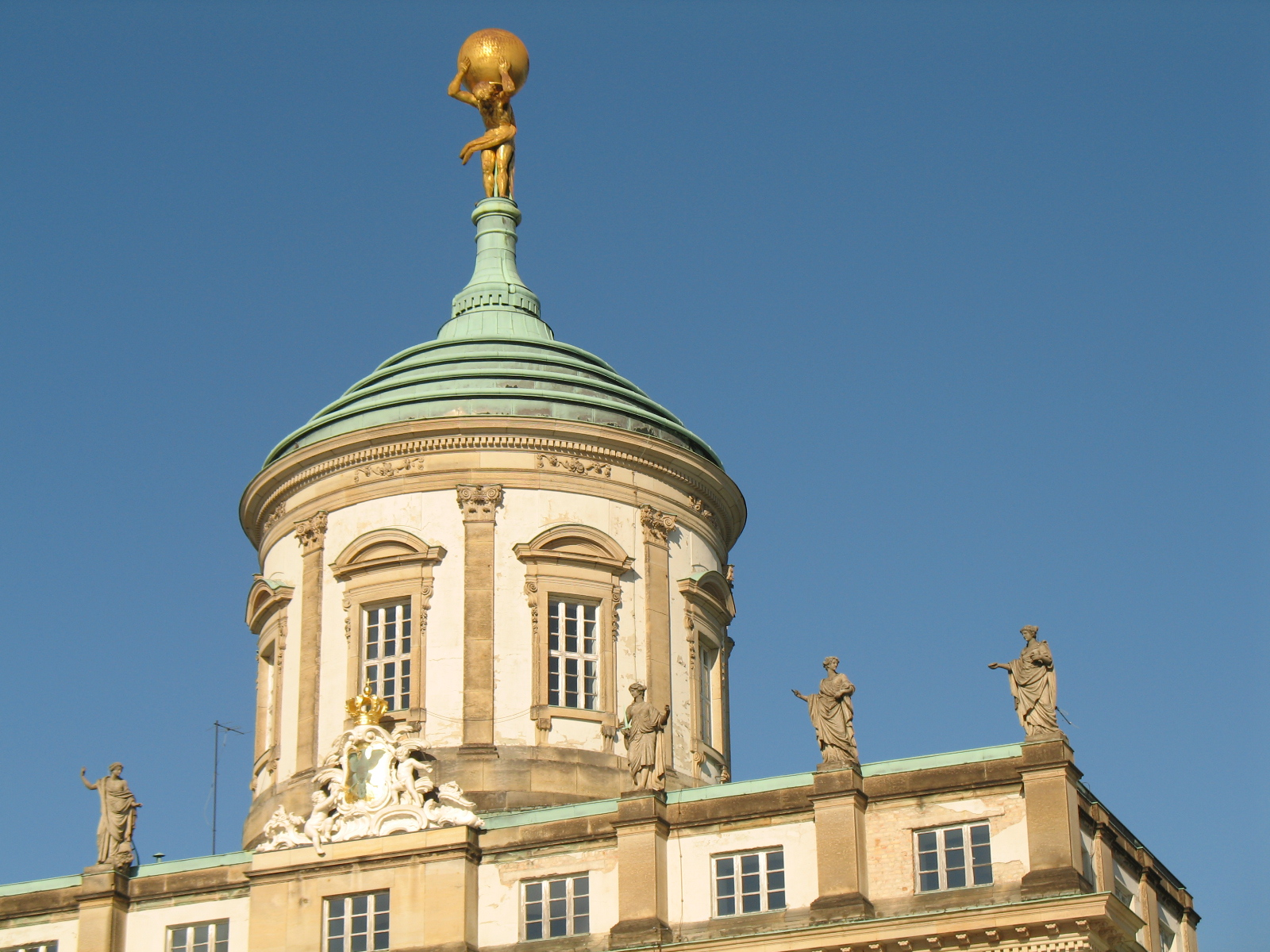
The cupola of the Alte Rathaus, with Atlas on the top.

=== Post-war history ===
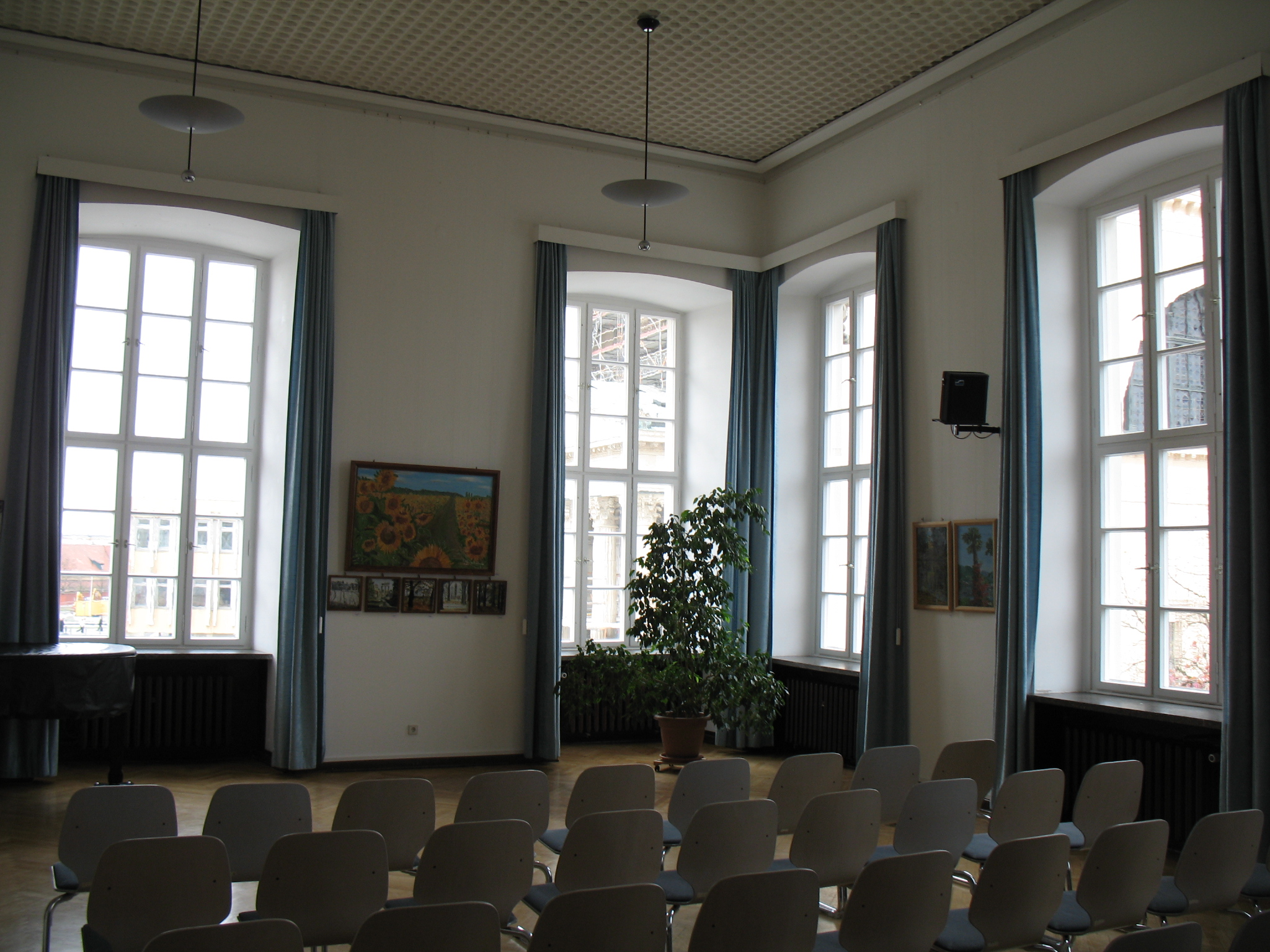
The Music Room - various exhibitions were held her regularly.

== Bibliography (in German) ==
- Siegfried Heinz Begenau: Das Kulturhaus „Hans Marchwitza“ in Potsdam. In: Bildende Kunst, Berlin, 1966, Heft 9, S. 475–479.
- Hans Dreves: Der Umbau des Alten Rathauses in Potsdam. In: Zentralblatt der Bauverwaltung. Nr. 39, 1922, p. 236–239
- Hans-Joachim Giersberg, Hartmut Knitter: Potsdam Atlas. VEB Tourist Verlag, Berlin / Leipzig 1978.
- Paul Sigel, Silke Dähmlow, Frank Seehausen, Lucas Elmenhorst: Architekturführer Potsdam. Dietrich Reimer Verlag, Berlin 2006, ISBN 3-496-01325-7.
- Friedrich Mielke: Potsdamer Baukunst. Das klassische Potsdam. Frankfurt am Main / Berlin 1981, ISBN 3-549-05668-0, S. 370.
- Waltraud Volk: Potsdam, Kulturhaus „Hans Marchwitza“. VEB E.A. Seemann, Buch- und Kunstverlag, Leipzig 1978.
- Ehem. Rathaus. In: Georg Dehio: Handbuch der deutschen Kunstdenkmäler. Brandenburg. Deutscher Kunstverlag, Berlin, 2000, S. 794/795

== External links (in German) ==
- Listed building entry
- Alter Markt - Altes Rathaus mit Video link
- brandenburg.museum-digital.de
- Potsdamer Mitte
- Georg Ignaszewski: Der Atlas in Potsdam-Restaurierung eines Weltkulturerbes. (PDF; 0,7 MB) seifert-restaurierung.de
