= Gottlieb Heymüller =

Johann Mathias Gottlieb Heymüller (Note: He appears in the baptismal register as Matthias Theophilus Haimbmillner) (20 February 1718 – 17 December 1763) was a German sculptor active in Bamberg and court sculptor to the Kings of Prussia in Potsdam. He is one of the most important artists of the Frederician Rococo.

== Life ==
He was born in Gleink Abbey, Upper Austria to court master Johann Florian Heymüller (died 28 July 1754). On 22 February 1740 in Bamberg he married Maria Elisabeth, the daughter of Johann Jakob Vogel, stucco-artist to the Prussian court - this made him brother-in-law of Johann Peter Benkert. He worked with Benkert in a shared workshop, making it difficult to identify autograph works by Heymüller. He also worked in Kersbach and Memmelsdorf.

Probably following a call from Benkert, in 1746 Heymüller moved to Potsdam, where he later died. Both he and Benkert lived in the parish of Peter and Paul in the city. Among other collaborations between the two artists are the life-size figures of tea-drinking and music-making Chinese figures arranged around the Chinese House (built 1755-1764) in Sanssouci park.

== Works in Potsdam ==
- Gable relief on the Stadtschloss (deposited during the demolition of the ruins), 1751
- Attic figures on the Stadtschloss (partially preserved), 1750s
- Attic figures of the Rathaus (replaced by copies by Horst Misch), 1753
- Jewelled vases in Rococo form on the attic of the uniformly-designed town houses at 9a-11 Schlossstraße and 10/11 Am Neuen Markt, 1752
- Attic vases of the house designed by Knobelsdorff at 13 Henning-von-Tresckow-Straße, 1752
- Sculptures on the obelisk in the Alter Markt - reliefs of the Hohenzollern rulers from Elector Frederick William to King Frederick the Great (replaced by portraits of Potsdam architects during the 1979 reconstruction), figures of orators, sphinxes, 1753-1755 - collaboration with Benkert and Benjamin Giese
- Figures of legionaries and reliefs, Plögerscher Gasthof, 1754
- Marble sculptures for the Sanssouci Picture Gallery, 1755-1763; collaboration with Benkert, Felice Cocci and Giuseppe Girola
- Chinese sculptures on the Chinese House, Sanssouci, 1755-1756
- Statue decoration of the Neues Palais’ (studio works), from 1763 onwards

== Bibliography (in German) ==
- Karl Sitzmann: Künstler und Kunsthandwerker in Ostfranken. S. 246–248.
- 'Gottlieb Heymüller'. In: Hans Vollmer (ed.): Allgemeines Lexikon der Bildenden Künstler von der Antike bis zur Gegenwart. Founded by Ulrich Thieme and Felix Becker. Volume 17: Heubel–Hubard. E. A. Seemann, Leipzig 1924, p. 35–36
