= Ephraim Palace =

- Ephraim-Palais
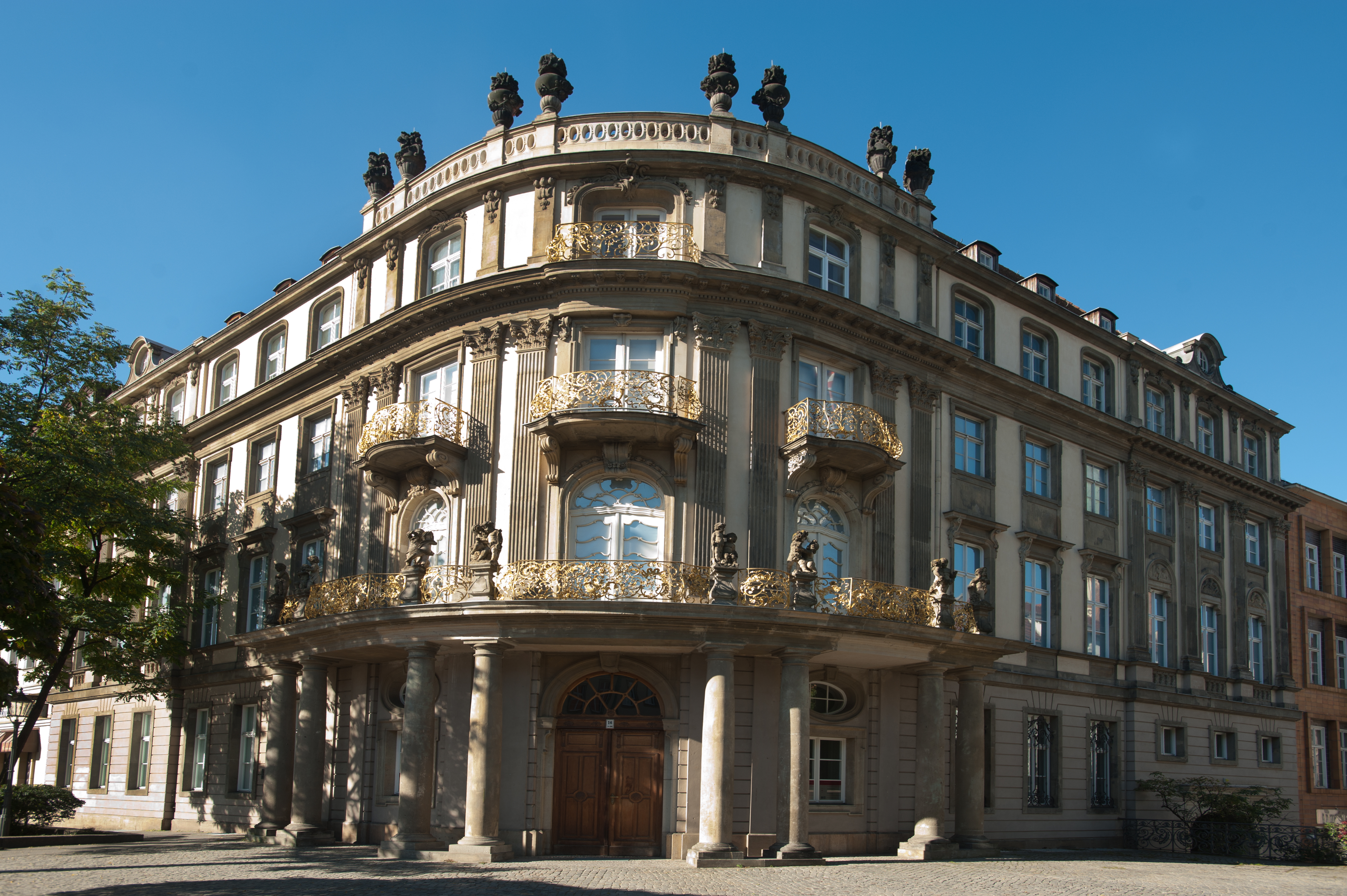
- Ephraim Palace, 2010
- Interactive map of the Ephraim Palace area

General information
- Type: Palace
- Architectural style: Rococo
- Location: Berlin, Germany
- Coordinates: 52.5159°N 13.4072°E
- Construction started: 1762
- Completed: 1766
- Renovated: 1985-1987 (rebuild)

Design and construction
- Architect: Friedrich Wilhelm Dieterichs

The Ephraim Palace (German: Ephraim-Palais) is a Rococo-style building in Berlin, Germany, originally constructed in 1766. Despite the destruction of the palace in 1936 by Nazi Germany, East German state sponsored reconstruction began in 1985, as many elements of the facade were restored. Today, the Ephraim Palace is a cultural-heritage property and houses a museum, Stadtmuseum Berlin, mostly dealing with cultural topics.

The Ephraim Palace is named after Veitel Heine Ephraim, who hired the experienced architect Friedrich Wilhelm Dieterichs to design a palace on the property of the oldest pharmacy of Berlin.

== Bibliography ==
- Rolf-Herbert Krüger. "Das Ephraim-Palais in Berlin – Ein Beitrag zur preußischen Kulturgeschichte". Berlin: Verlag für Bauwesen, 1990. ISBN 3-345-00241-8
