= Carl Ludwig Hildebrandt =

Carl Ludwig Hildebrandt (or Christian; 1720-1770) was a Prussian master builder under Frederick the Great, mainly working in Berlin and Potsdam. He was one of the most important artists of the Frederician Rococo.

== Life ==
He was born in the Neumark to a preacher there and studied architecture in Berlin from 1739 onwards under Johann Carl Stoltze († 1746), who also served as chief building director. After his training, he obtained a position there as a 'conductor' in the building trade. Stoltze was succeeded as chief building director by Friedrich Wilhelm Diterichs and in 1744 Diterichs appointed Hildebrandt to the building office in Potsdam, where he worked on the terracing of the royal vineyard on the Klausberg in Potsdam and on repairs to the Potsdam City Palace.

He died in Graz.

== Bibliography (in German) ==
- Heinrich Ludwig Manger: Heinrich Ludewig Manger's Baugeschichte von Potsdam, besonders unter der Regierung König Friedrichs des Zweiten. Nicolai, Berlin / Stettin 1789, p. 627–629.
- 'Hildebrandt, Carl Ludwig.' In: Hans Vollmer (ed.): Thieme-Becker Volume 17: Heubel–Hubard. E. A. Seemann, Leipzig 1924, p. 74 (biblos.pk.edu.pl).
- Waltraud Volk: Potsdam. Historische Straßen und Plätze heute. 2., stark bearbeitete Auflage. Verlag für Bauwesen, Berlin/München 1993, ISBN 3-345-00488-7, p. 54.
