= Johann Carl Stoltze =

Prussian architect

Johann Carl Stoltze (died 1746) was a Prussian architect and master builder.

Under Frederick William I of Prussia, after Martin Heinrich Böhme's death, he was among the most-renowned architects, alongside Philipp Gerlach, his employee Horst, and Johann Gottfried Kemmeter.

== Life ==
Nothing is known of Stoltze's origins, education and early career. Having come from the military, he mainly worked as a construction supervisor. From 1718 to 1738, he led the reclamation of the royal district of Königshorst between Nauen and Fehrbellin, from 1734 onward in collaboration with Kemmeter. He also worked on the city hall and a school in Frankfurt an der Oder and an extension to the Garrison Church in Potsdam (1737).

This work led to his appointment in 1734 as "Chief Building Director" and "War and Domains Councillor" in the Electoral March Chamber. Also in 1734, he, Friedrich Wilhelm Dieterichs, Philipp Wilhelm Nuglisch and Kemmeter formed the commission investigating the collapse of the tower of the Petriskirche (Berlin-Mitte), first built by Johann Friedrich Grael. One week after Grael's arrest, he was appointed his successor on 11 January 1735.

Fraud by Stoltze regarding the construction-yard property was investigated by his successor, Christian Friedrich Feldmann, who forced Stoltze's heirs to return the property to the state.

== Buildings ==
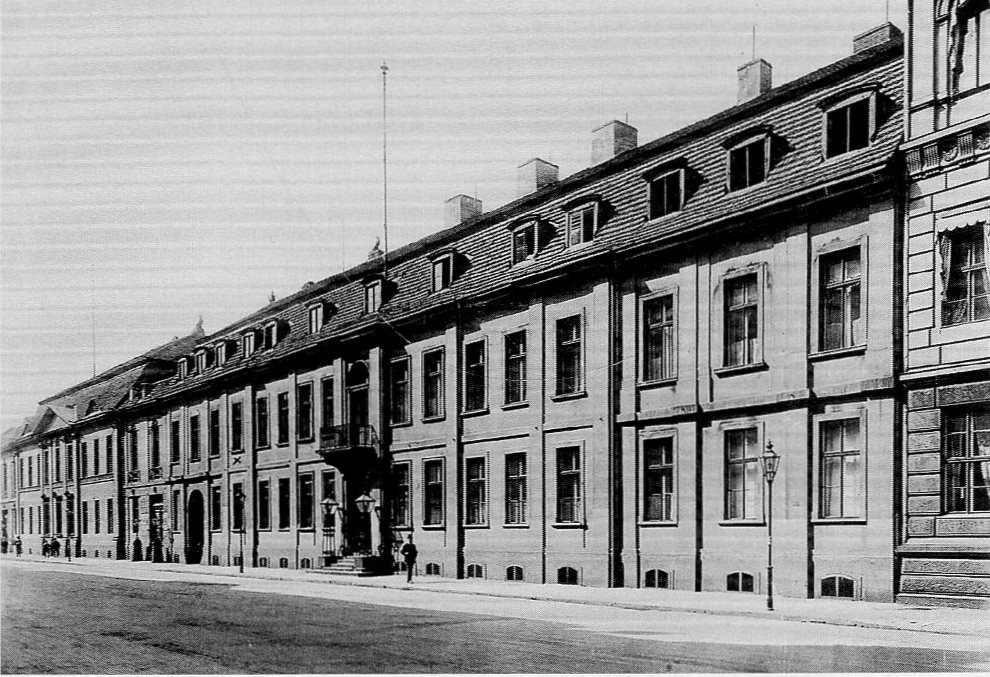
The Deckersche Haus, previously the Palais Stoltze, 1870s image.

- 1723: completion of the Cölln Rathaus (based on heavily altered designs by Martin Grünberg, in collaboration with Michael Kemmeter)
- 1726–1730: management of the regulation and expansion of Spandau
- 1726–1730: reconstruction of the Rathaus in Spandau
- 1734–1736: Palais Osten, Unter den Linden 4 (demolished in 1879)
- 1735: Johanneskirche in Spandau (construction from 1750 onwards by Christian Friedrich Feldmann)
- 1735–1738: his own house, Wilhelmstraße 75 (known as the Deckersches Haus, destroyed in the Second World War)
- 1738: tower of the Petrikirche (construction management with Titus de Favre; not completed)
- 1737–1739: Dreifaltigkeitskirche in Berlin (possibly a collaboration with Favre and participation in the execution together with Christian August Naumann)
- 1737: continuation of the construction of the Palais Happe, Leipziger Straße 5–7 (begun by Friedrich Wilhelm Dieterichs)
- 1737–1739: three parsonages at the junction of Taubenstraße and Kanonierstraße (renamed Glinkastraße in 1951) (collaboration with Favre; listed building)

== Personal life ==
He was married to Catharina Maria Kottler, with whom he had two children, Johann Ludwig and Charlotte Wilhelmine Catharina (1732–1785).

== Bibliography (in German) ==
- Kieling, Uwe (1987). Berlin. Baumeister und Bauten. Von der Gotik bis zum Historismus. Berlin / Leipzig: Tourist Verlag. ISBN 3-350-00280-3.

== See also ==
- List of German architects
- List of people from Berlin
