= Johannes Meyer =

Johannes Meyer may refer to:

- Johannes Meyer (actor) (1884–1972), Danish film actor
- Johannes Meyer (director) (1888–1976), German screenwriter and film director
- Johannes Meyer (rugby union) (born 1981), Namibian rugby player
- Johannes Meyer (British politician), British politician and MP for Downton
- Johannes Meyer (Estonian politician), Estonian politician representing the German-Baltic Party

== See also ==
- Hans May (1886–1958), Austrian composer born Johannes Mayer
- Johanne Meyer (1838–1915), Danish suffragist, pacifist and journal editor
- Johannes Mayer (1893–1963), German general
