= Hans-Jürgen Mende =

German historian (1945–2018)

Hans-Jürgen Mende (19 May 1945 in Berlin-Kreuzberg – 21 September 2018 in Rostock) was a German historian. He was a lecturer in the history of philosophy at the Weißensee Academy of Art Berlin. After the reunification of Germany (1989/90) he became founder and managing director of the social and cultural-historical association Luisenstädtischer Bildungsverein, whose main aim was the research and spreading of the history of Berlin and Brandenburg.

Mende died in Berlin at the age of 73.

== Publications ==
- (ed.): Lexikon ‚Alle Berliner Straßen und Plätze‘ – Von der Gründung bis zur Gegenwart. Neues Leben / Edition Luisenstadt, Berlin 1998, ISBN 3-355-01491-5 (4 volumes, 2300 pages).
- with Kurt Wernicke (ed.): Reihe Berliner Bezirkslexikon:
  - Kathrin Chod, Herbert Schwenk, Hainer Weißpflug: Berliner Bezirkslexikon Mitte. 2 volumes. FTS Berlin / Edition Luisenstadt, 2001, ISBN 3-89542-111-1.
  - Kathrin Chod, Herbert Schwenk, Hainer Weißpflug: Berliner Bezirkslexikon Friedrichshain-Kreuzberg. 2 volumes. FTS Berlin / Edition Luisenstadt, 2002, ISBN 3-89542-122-7.
  - Kathrin Chod, Herbert Schwenk, Hainer Weißpflug: Berliner Bezirkslexikon Friedrichshain-Kreuzberg. Haude und Spener / Edition Luisenstadt, Berlin 2003, ISBN 3-7759-0474-3.
  - Hainer Weißpflug et al.: Berliner Bezirkslexikon Charlottenburg-Wilmersdorf. Haude und Spener / Edition Luisenstadt, Berlin 2005, ISBN 3-7759-0479-4.
  - Hainer Weißpflug et al.: Berliner Bezirkslexikon Treptow-Köpenick. FTS Berlin / Edition Luisenstadt, 2009, ISBN 978-3-89542-153-2.
- Hans-Jürgen Mende (ed.): Reihe Berliner Friedhofsführer. 2002–2015, 23rd issue.
- with Sylvia Lais (ed.): Lexikon Berliner Straßennamen. Haude und Spener, Berlin 2003, ISBN 3-7759-0477-8.
- Lexikon Berliner Begräbnisstätten. Pharus-Plan, Berlin 2018, ISBN 978-3-86514-206-1.
- Der Jüdische Friedhof in Berlin-Weißensee. Pharus Verlag, Berlin 2016, ISBN 978-3-86514-217-7.
