= Berlin Gate =

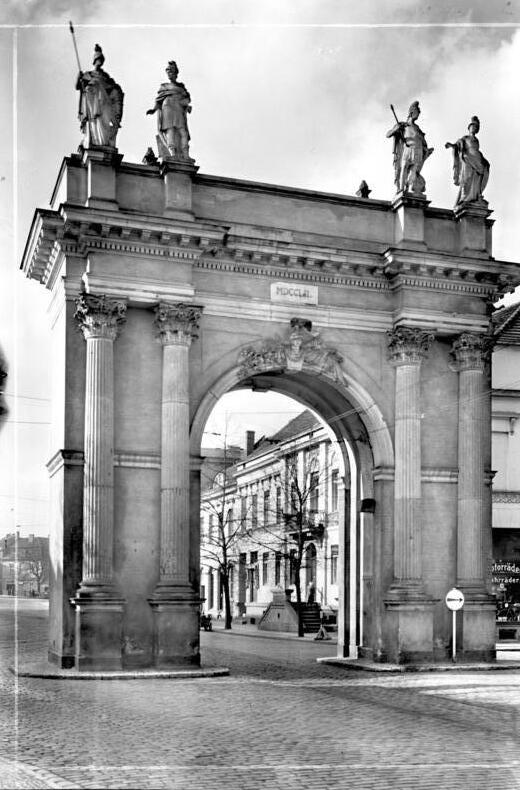
The Gate in 1928.

The Berlin Gate (Berliner Tor) was a baroque city gate in Potsdam, on the corner Türkstraße of Berliner Straße, built in 1752.

At the turn of the 20th century the gate was moved approximately 15 meters into the city to accommodate increased traffic. After the damage it sustained during the World War II, the gate and the left-hand wing were demolished in 1951 for the same traffic concerns.

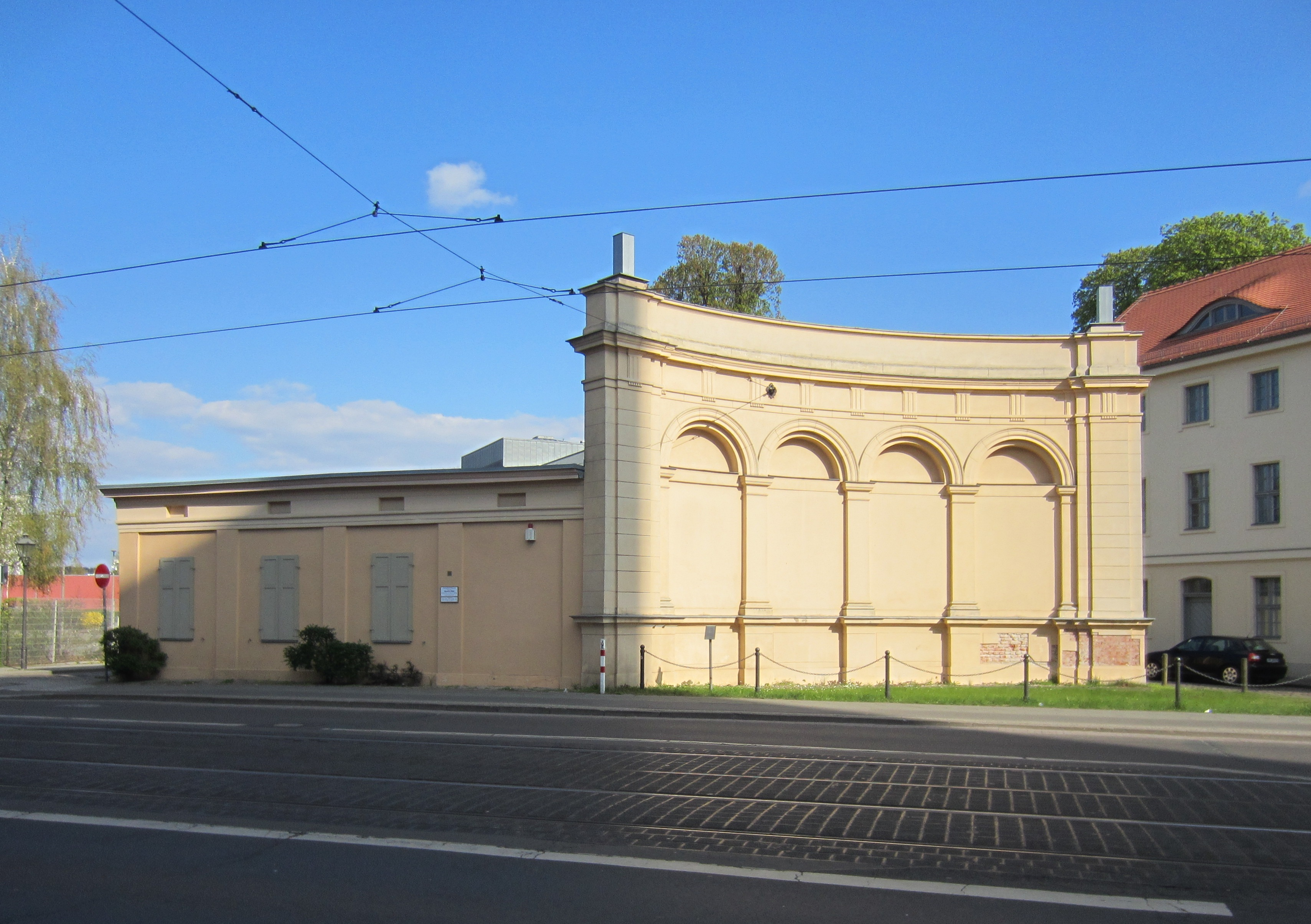
The side wing in spring of 2015.

The right-hand wing, however, remains intact. The attic figures, absent from the gate since war, are preserved in their original form by SPSG (Stiftung Preußische Schlösser und Gärten Berlin-Brandenburg), the Prussian Palaces and Gardens Foundation.
