= Johann Heinrich Meyer (publisher) =

German bookseller and publisher

Johann Heinrich Meyer (2 March 1812 in Braunschweig – 4 November 1863 in Braunschweig; also known as Heinrich Meyer) was a German bookseller and publisher.

== Origin ==
Heinrich Meyer came from an old family of printers who had been active in Lemgo since 1610. His great-great-grandfather Heinrich Wilhelm Meyer had moved to Braunschweig in 1707 and had taken over the printing house from Christoph Friedrich Zilliger in 1716. Heinrich was the eldest son of Johann Heinrich Meyer (1768–1827) and Dorothea Elisabeth née Pfeiffer († 1862), the daughter of a master glazier.

== Life and work ==
Attending school at the Katharineum in Braunschweig inspired Heinrich for the sciences, but the early death of his father prevented him from planning to study. Under the direction of his mother, he joined his father's book printing shop, developed high standards of typography and expanded his knowledge through specialist literature and sightseeing trips to printing houses, machine shops and libraries in Germany, the Netherlands, France and Denmark. In 1834, he founded the Journal für Buchdruckerkunst, of which he remained editor until the end of his life. On 27 October 1838, Meyer received his doctorate from the philosophical faculty of the University of Jena on the basis of his writings and achievements in the typographical field.

Because he could not agree with his mother on the management, Heinrich founded a type and stereotype foundry around 1838, and in 1841 with his brother Hermann in the same street as his father's business, the Gebrüder Meyer book printing company, which he expanded in 1843 to include an engraving company. In 1848, his mother handed over his father's business to the brothers. The title "Hofbuchdruckerei", which he had received in 1840, was revoked in 1852, presumably because of the printing of democratic writings.

After the death of his brother Hermann on 8 December 1860, Heinrich continued to run the company alone under his father's name. After a long nervous disease and suffering from lung and kidney disease starting from September 1863, he succumbed to the illnesses on November 4 of the same year.

== Family and succession ==
Heinrich Meyer married Luise Dangers, the daughter of a senior bailiff in Jerxheim, on 27 September 1843, and after her death on 10 April 1858, had a second marriage in 1860 to the merchant's widow Marie Nickel née Mellin, who survived him for many years.

The business was only continued under guardianship until his eldest son Stephan (born 2 January 1845) came of age and took over the business. He expanded the Journal für Buchdruckerkunst again, but on 1 October 1881 it was handed over to Ferd. Schlotke in Hamburg and withdrew completely from business life in 1892. The company "Joh. Heinr. Meyer" was transferred to Heinrich Kleucker from Hildesheim and has changed hands several times since then.

The printing and publishing house Joh. Heinr. Meyer still exists in Braunschweig today. In addition to the Braunschweig address book, the company today mainly publishes literature with a regional reference. In addition, brochures and trade journals are printed.

== Works ==
At the age of 22, Meyer founded the Journal for the Art of Printing, Type Foundry and Related Subjects, which soon became the organ of the entire industry. It was published monthly from 1 July 1834, twice a month from 1845 and weekly from 1860.

Reference books from his range were:

- Handbuch der Stereotypie, 1838
- Gutenberg's album, 1840 – a model achievement of the time, especially in typographical terms, published by Vieweg & Sohn
- Address Book of the Book Printers of Central Europe, the Lithography, Copper and Steel Engraving Printing Works, etc., 1854

He gradually developed the Brunswick Address Book, founded by his father in 1805, into a state handbook.
