= Jan Bouman =

Dutch architect

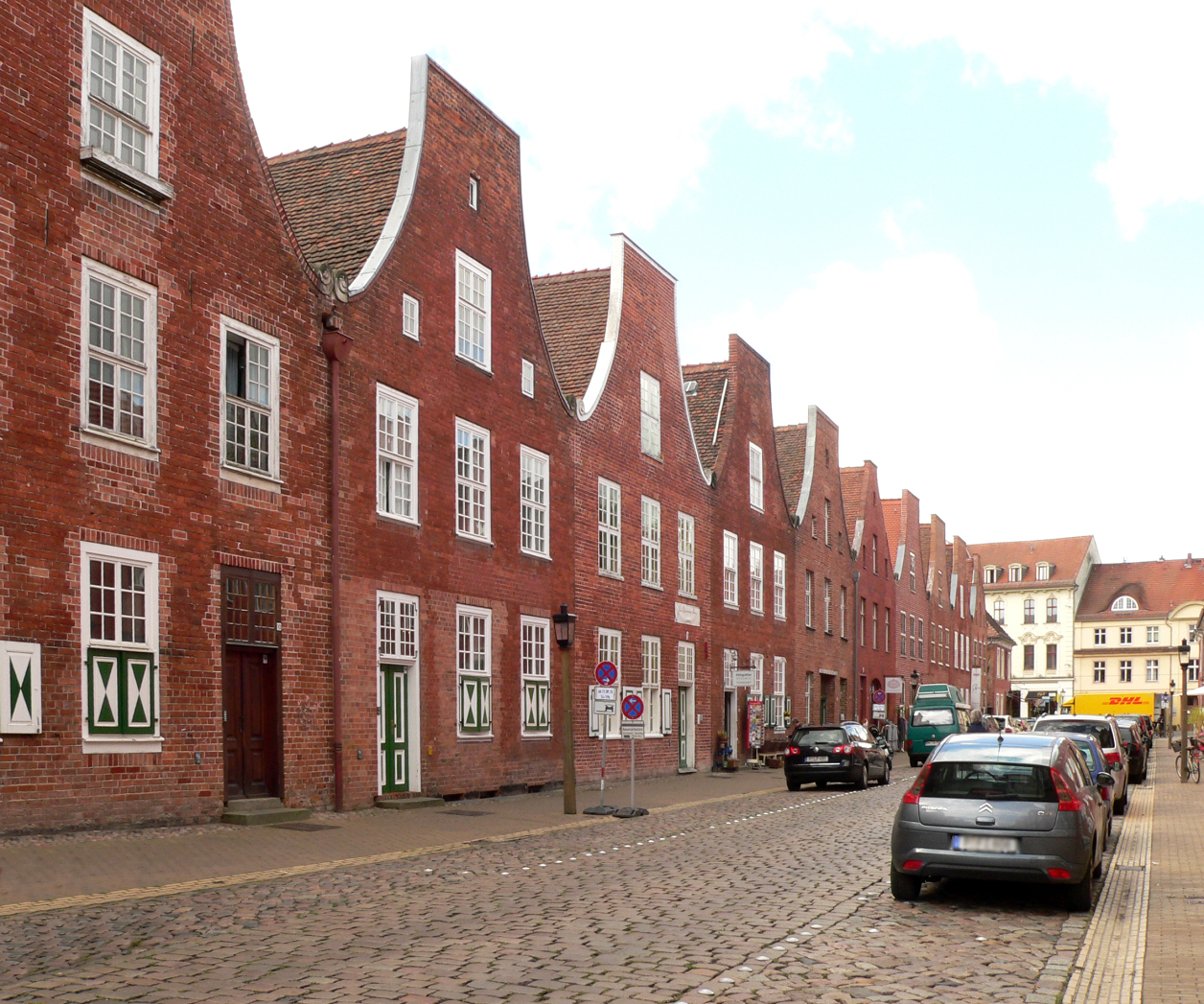
The Dutch Quarter in Potsdam

Jan Bouman (28 August 1706, in Amsterdam – 6 September 1776, in Berlin) was a Dutch architect, mainly notable for his work as designer and general contractor on the Dutch Quarter in Potsdam by order of Frederick William I of Prussia.

He designed its canals and squares along with Potsdam's Berlin Gate and town hall, the latter influenced by the Royal Palace of Amsterdam.
