= Johann Peter Benkert =

Johann Peter Benkert (11 November 1709 - 14 December 1765 or 1769) was a German sculptor of the Frederician Rococo.

== Life ==
He was born in the Neustadt parish of Neuhaus in Neustadt an der Saale to pan smith Johann Benkert. He learned his trade as a sculptor in Johann Joseph Keßler's studio in Königshofen. After completing his apprenticeship he began his years as a journeyman - he is documented in Eichstätt and Munich and may also have been in Vienna. In Eichstätt he was employed by Kaspar Eygen. In the mid 1730s he was journeyman to Franz Anton Schlott in Bamberg. After Schlott's death he married his widow in 1739 - she was the daughter of the court stucco-artist Johann Jakob Vogel. He also worked in Ebrach, Langheim Abbey, Lichtenfels, Forchheim and Gößweinstein.

He died in Potsdam.

== Bibliography (in German) ==
- Karl Sitzmann: Künstler und Kunsthandwerker in Ostfranken (= Die Plassenburg, Band 12), Verlag Freunde der Plassenburg, 2. Aufl., Kulmbach 1983, p. 37–40.
- Pfarrbrief der Pfarrei Peter & Paul in Potsdam vom 23. September – 1. Dezember 2007.
