= Friedrich Wilhelm Dieterichs =

Prussian architect (1702–1782

Friedrich Wilhelm Dieterichs, Diterichs or Dietrichs (10 April 1702 – 13 December 1782) was an architect, engineer and building official working for the Kingdom of Prussia in the 18th century. He created Baroque buildings in Berlin and its surroundings and was one of the most-important artists of the Frederician Rococo.

== Training ==
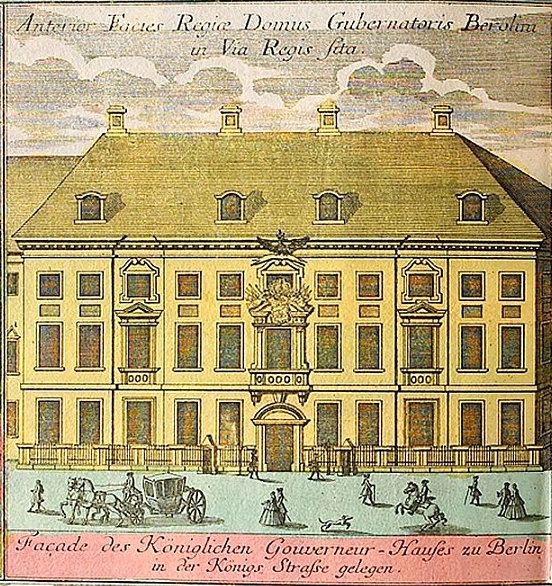
The Governor's House in Berlin, 1750.

He was born in Uelzen but left the town, age fifteen, to move to Berlin as an apprentice to Martin Heinrich Böhme (1676–1725), master builder to the court and palace. Böhme worked as an employee of Andreas Schlüter on remodelling and extending the palaces in Berlin and Potsdam. After Frederick I of Prussia's death in 1713, building projects shifted from large luxurious buildings to houses and roads and to renovating and repairing Prussia's churches, bridges, locks and factories. This made it a bad time for Diterichs to enter Böhme's office, which he did in 1717.

Early in his career, Diterichs was a clerk and was responsible for organising construction. From 1719 to 1724, during the construction of the church in Schwedt, he was promoted to "conductor", a title lower than that of engineer. As an architect, Diterichs was equally encouraged by his master and the first building he designed and built with Böhme in 1721 was the Governor's House at the junction of Jüdenstrasse and Königstrasse (now Rathausstraße) in Berlin. From 1721 to 1723, he produced designs for the transformation of Berlin's Gertraudenkirche on Spittelmarkt.

== Public role and architectural career ==
In 1723, Diterichs became a civil servant. As new inspector of buildings, he had to support Frederick William I's ideas on improving civil construction in the Kurmark. Among other projects, Diterichs was responsible for the territories of the offices and towns in the Altmark, Priegnitz and the Uckermark.

Besides constructing buildings – and his specific fields of civil engineering and architecture, the specialist fields of building watercourses, bridges, locks, paths and dikes, and industrial construction – he worked as a royal servant. Rural industrial construction projects included lime and brick distilleries, cutting and grinding mills and farm buildings with breweries, which also depended on estates. In the following years, Diterichs proved himself a perfect master by building locks on the Rhine river near Ruppin (1728), Fürstenwalde (1727) and Neuen Graben (1726), near the mill in Fürstenwalde (1729) and new locks at Ponts de Raßmannsdorf near Beeskow (1729) and Bindow within the architectural office of Storkow (1734).

== See also ==
- List of German architects
- List of people from Berlin

== Bibliography (in German) ==
- Heinrich Wilhelm Rotermund: Dieterichs (Friedrich Wilhelm). Dans ders.: Das Gelehrte Hannover oder Lexikon von Schriftstellern und Schriftstellerinnen, gelehrten Geschäftsmännern und Künstlern, die seit der Reformation in und außerhalb der sämtlichen zum Königreich Hannover gehörigen Provinzen gelebt haben und noch leben, aus den glaubwürdigsten Schriftstellern zusammengetragen. Volume 1. Car Schünemann, Bremen 1823, p. CXVIII-CXIX; Friedrich Wilhelm Dieterichs at the Internet Archive
- Friedrich F.A. Kuntze: Das Alte Berlin. Verlag für Kunstwissenschaft, Berlin 1937.
- Bodo Harenberg (ed.): Die Chronik Berlins. Chronik-Verlag, Dortmund 1986, ISBN 3-88379-082-6.
- Rolf-Herbert Krüger: Friedrich Wilhelm Diterichs. Potsdamer Verlagsbuchhandlung, 1994, ISBN 3-910196-11-X.
- Gert Streidt, Peter Feierabend (ed.): Preußen – Kunst und Architektur. Könemann Verlagsgesellschaft, Cologne 1999, ISBN 3-89508-424-7.
- Markus Sebastian Braun (ed.): Berlin – Der Architekturführer. Verlagsgruppe Econ Ullstein List, Munich 2001, ISBN 3-88679-355-9.

== External links (in German) ==
- Kathrin Chod, Herbert Schwenk, Hainer Weisspflug: Dieterichs, Friedrich Wilhelm. In: Hans-Jürgen Mende, Kurt Wernicke (ed.): Berliner Bezirkslexikon, Mitte. Luisenstädtischer Bildungsverein. Haude und Spener / Edition Luisenstadt, Berlin 2003, ISBN 3-89542-111-1 (luise-berlin.de – Stand 7. Oktober 2009).
