= Johann Friedrich Meyer =

Johann Friedrich Meyer (24 October 1705 – 2 November 1765) was a Thuringian chemist and pharmacist who ardently supported the phlogiston theory even after the work of Joseph Black was published. He contributed greatly to debates in the chemistry of the time although he was wrong, often reviving obsolete ideas from alchemy.

== Biography ==
Meyer was born in Osnabrück, to physician Johann Andreas (1670–1714) and Sophia Margaretha née Gottfried (1683–1742). He wished to study theology but was forced to work at the Hirsch pharmacy in Bramsche belonging to his maternal family. After apprenticing there he went to Leipzig and after periods of unemployment, joined a pharmacy in Nordhausen in 1727. He worked for a while in the pharmacy of the Francke Foundations at Halle and return to his family business in Osnabrück, inheriting its ownership in 1737. He worked there until his death.

Meyer married Anna Sara née Krochmann in 1738 and she died childless in 1759.

== Scientific work ==
In 1764, Meyer published a book on his researchers Chymische Versuche zur näheren Erkenntnis des ungelöschten Kalchs in which he claimed that alkaline substances had an element derived from fire called acidum pinque produced by the reaction of acids with fire. He said phlogiston converted calxes into metals while acidum pingue calcined metals (CaCO_{3} + "acidum pinque" -> CaO). He later called it the theory of causticum and claimed that mild alkalis effervesced by absorbing causticum while caustic alkalis were already saturated with acidum pinque and would not effervesce. Meyer argued against Joseph Black who in 1756 had explained the difference as being between the presence or absence of "fixed air". Meyer's ideas found support with Johann Christian Wiegleb, Karl Wilhelm Pörner, and Antoine Baumé. The subsequent debates and experiments clarified ideas on oxygen and erased his ideas. Nearly 45 books and papers dealt with the controversy in the years between 1764 and 1804.
