= City Palace, Potsdam =

Potsdam City Palace
- Potsdamer Stadtschloss
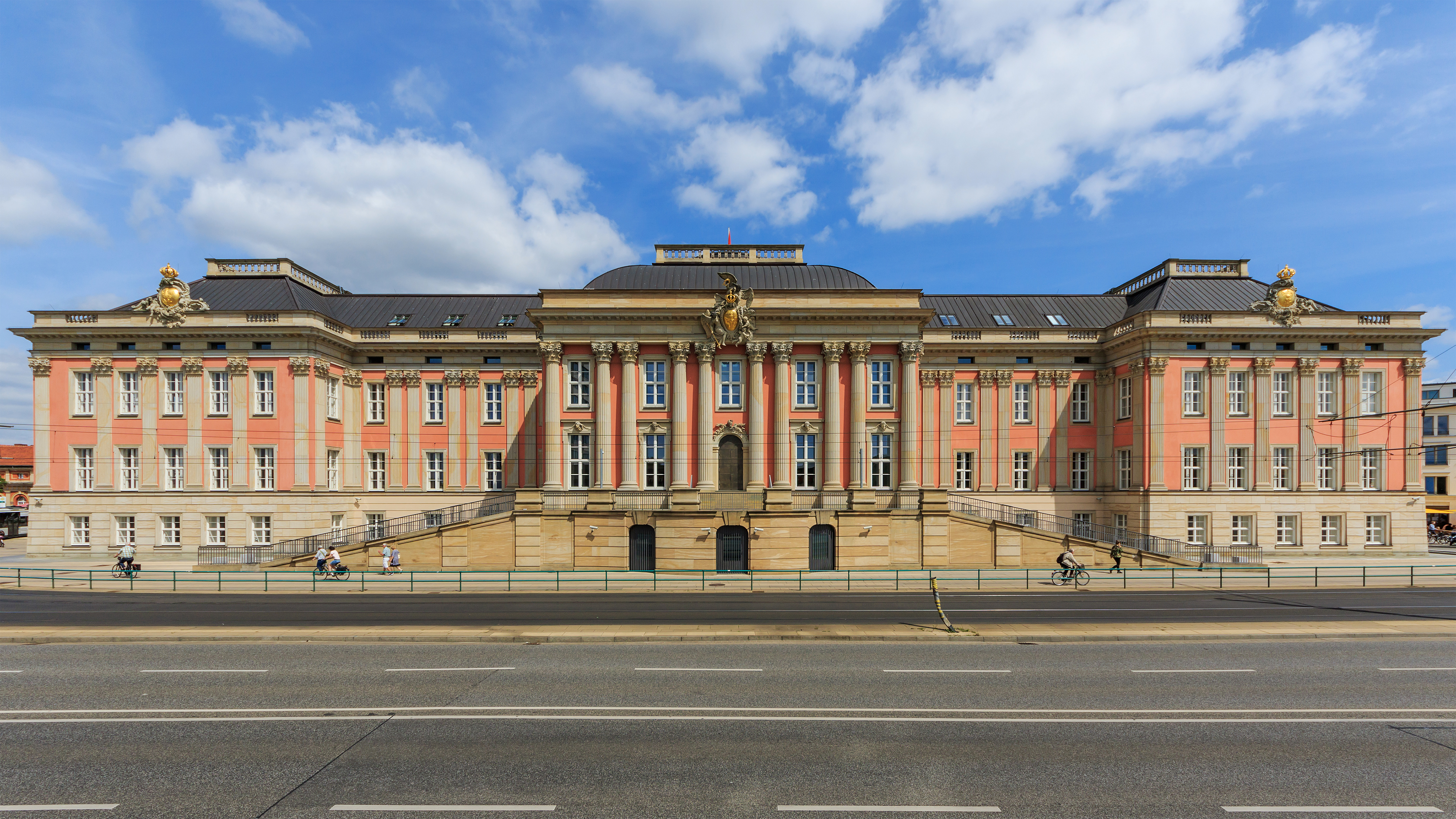
- Main facade of the Potsdam City Palace in 2017

General information
- Type: Palace
- Architectural style: Baroque, Rococo
- Location: Potsdam, Germany
- Coordinates: 52°23′38″N 13°03′36″E
- Construction started: 1662
- Completed: 1669
- Renovated: 1744–52, 2006–13 (rebuilt)
- Client: Frederick William, Elector of Brandenburg; Frederick II of Prussia; State of Brandenburg

Design and construction
- Architect: Georg Wenzeslaus von Knobelsdorff

The Potsdam City Palace (German: Potsdamer Stadtschloss) is a building in Potsdam, Germany, located on the Old Market Square, next to the St. Nicholas' Church (Nikolaikirche). It was the second official residence (the winter residence) of the margraves and electors of Brandenburg, later kings in Prussia, kings of Prussia and German emperors.

Heavily damaged in World War II and later dismantled by the East German Communist regime, the partial reconstruction, with historic facades and a modern interior, was completed in late 2013. The building has since served to house the parliament of the federal state of Brandenburg.

== History ==
The Baroque palace was constructed on the site of an earlier fortification from 1662 to 1669 under Prince-Elector Friedrich Wilhelm, and was rebuilt from 1744 to 1752 by Georg Wenzeslaus von Knobelsdorff under Friedrich II, who performed additional interior decoration. It stood as one of the most important examples of Frederician Rococo.

During an Allied bombing attack on 14 April 1945, the City Palace was bombed and burned out, although 83% of the building structure survived. However, the ruling Communist party (official name: Socialist Unity Party of Germany, SED) demolished the ruin in 1960, for ideological reasons. The formerly cohesive Old Market lost its face. The only portion of the palace left standing was the stables, which today houses the Potsdam Museum of Film.

In 1991, construction of a modern theatre, which had been initially planned under the GDR, began on the site of the City Palace. However, the project stalled. Although some steel framework was erected, it was subsequently torn down.

== Reconstruction ==
After the fall of the Berlin Wall, the ruling Party of Democratic Socialism (the former East German communist SED) twice rejected initiatives to reconstruct the Palace. However, in 1996 strong encouragement was provided by the "Potsdam Project" run by the Summer Academy for Young Architects of the Prince of Wales's Institute of Architecture. The Project recommended reinstatement of the historical footprint of the Palace via a partial reconstruction.

A Berlin lawyer and real estate entrepreneur, Michael Schöne, who bought and renovated old buildings, was troubled by the wasteland of the site, believing that Potsdam would never work until its core was restored. In 1996, he initiated the first attempt at reconstruction, with the launch of a fund. The vision was that the new palace would be home to galleries, museums and cafes or upstairs apartments and offices. However, opposition from various Potsdam cliques defeated the project and the collected money was returned to the donors.

However, shortly afterwards the PDS politician Birgit Müller, then chairman of the City Council, agreed to support the reconstruction of the main portal of the Palace, the Fortuna Gate. It was a small window in time, as the PDS would soon officially oppose reconstruction. The SPD under Matthias Platzeck also supported Schöne. In 1996, the City Castle Association was established, with Schöne as chairman. Large donations by the television presenter Günther Jauch and the Federal Association of the German Cement Industry, led by Jürgen Lose, made the rebuilding of the Fortuna Gate possible. It was completed in October 2002. The structure was seen as the bait to encourage rebuilding of the Palace itself, which was still opposed to by the political Left.

In a dramatic night vote, in 2000 the Potsdam City Council voted for reconstruction, but this had real no support at the state level, and at the time there was a recession. When the economy improved, in May 2005 there was agreement that the parliament would relocate from its GDR building to a new parliament building in the external forms of the historic palace. Despite this, the reconstruction still had strong opponents. Rainer Speer of the SPD, then finance minister, repeatedly tried to stop the project.

In 2007, a referendum was held to decide three building options for the remainder of the site. The Left Party was stunned when almost 50% of voters turned out (far more than for elections for the European parliament) and voted decisively for reconstruction of the Palace. "It's not what we wanted", the Left Party's parliamentary leader, Hans-Jürgen Scharfenberg, stated following the vote, "but, we'll respect people's decisions".

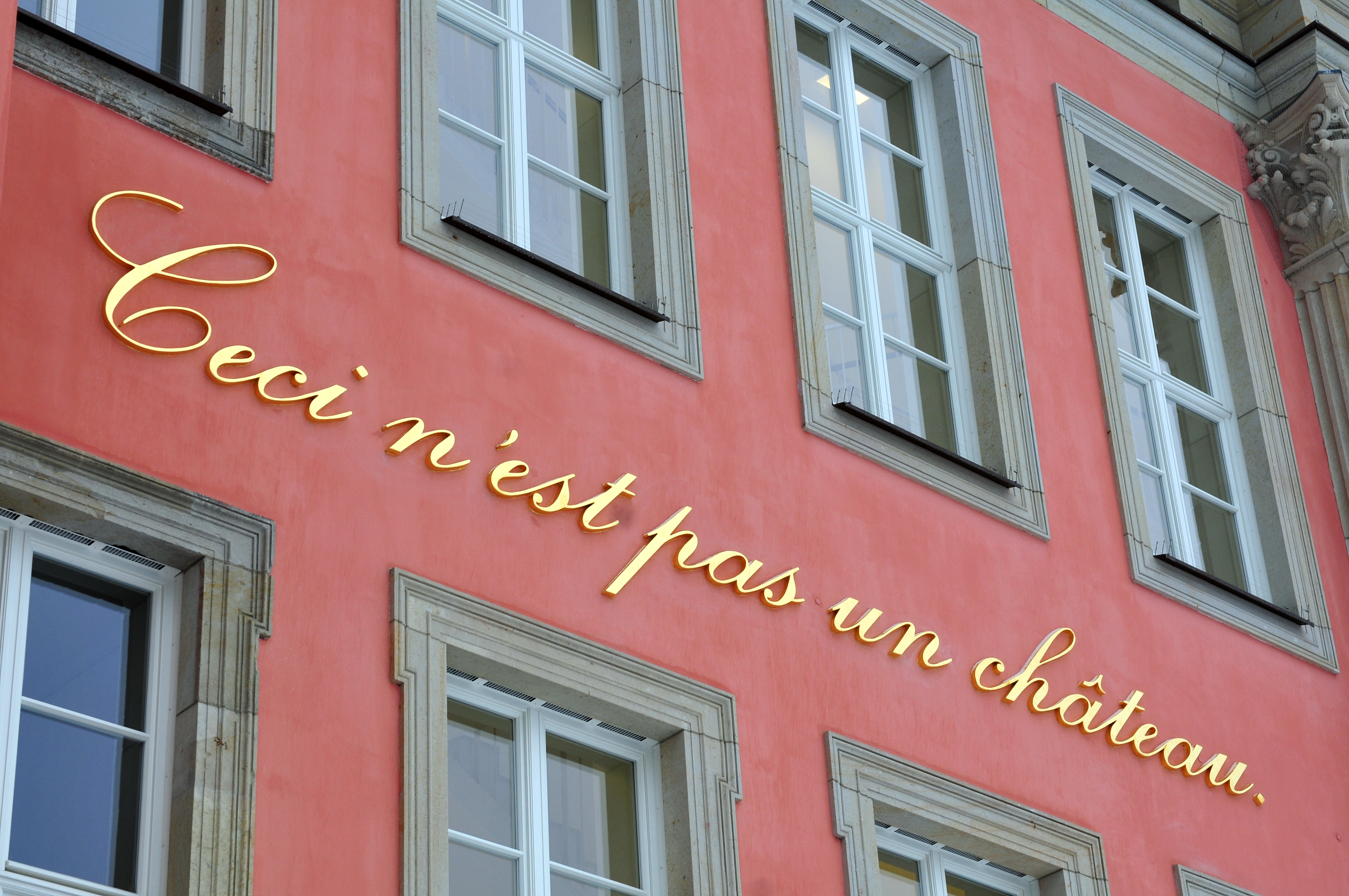
The inscription outside the palace

An architectural competition was launched. The initial plan was for only the principal northern facade to be an historical reconstruction, with the wings and interior modern, and the City Palace Association feared "cost optimised architecture" would dispense with many of the historical elements. Two days before the final meeting of the jury competition, the Minister-President of Brandenburg received a call from software mogul Hasso Plattner, offering a donation of €20 million to enable the entire historic façade to be reconstructed – at the time, the largest donation ever gifted in Germany by an individual. Plattner later provided a further large donation to enable the roof to be clad in the original copper. The Palace was completed in late 2013. The interior, which is modern, houses the parliament of the federal state of Brandenburg.

On one of the walls of the Palace there is an inscription "Ceci n'est pas un château" (This is not a palace), an allusion to René Magritte's painting The Treachery of Images – "Ceci n'est pas une pipe".

== Gallery ==
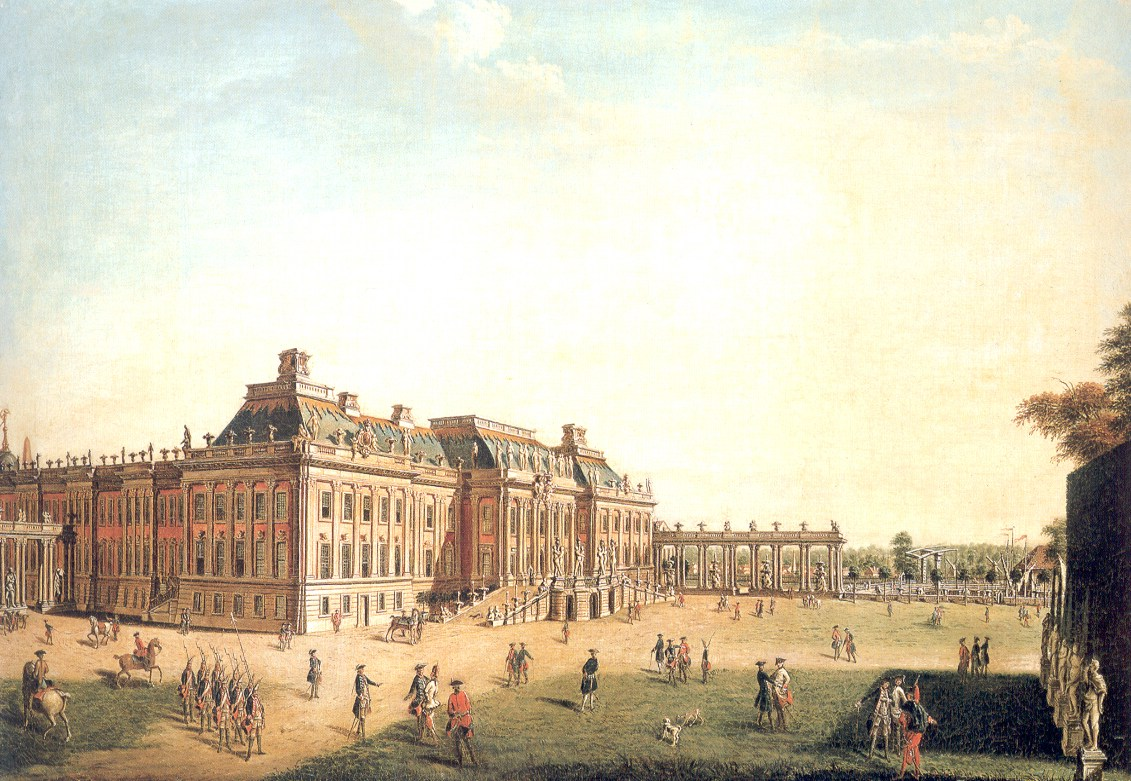
The Potsdam City Palace in 1773

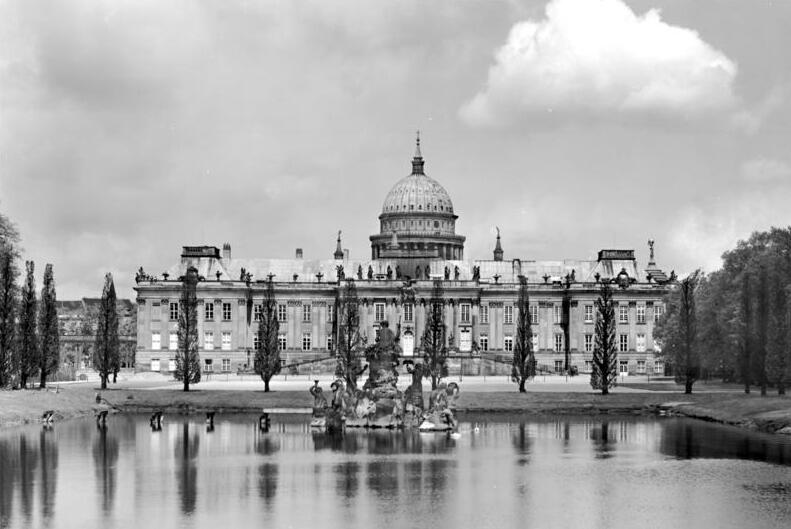
The Potsdam City Palace with the St. Nicholas Church in the background, 1928

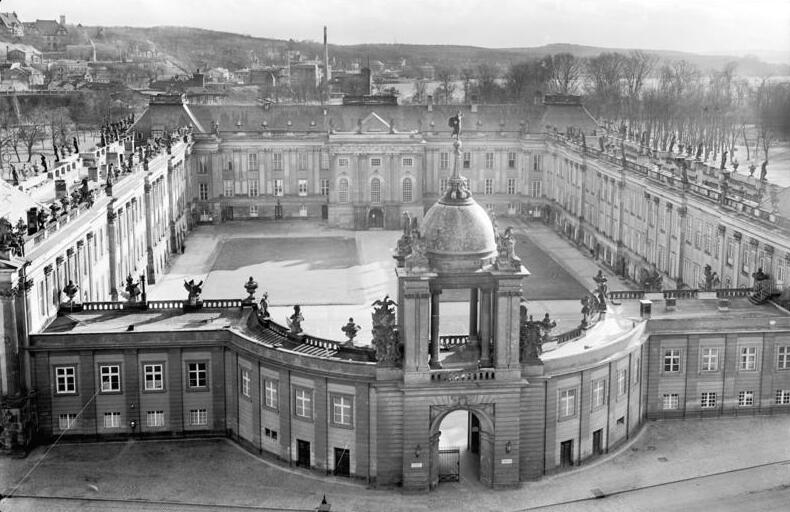
The Palace prior to destruction seen from the St. Nicholas Church

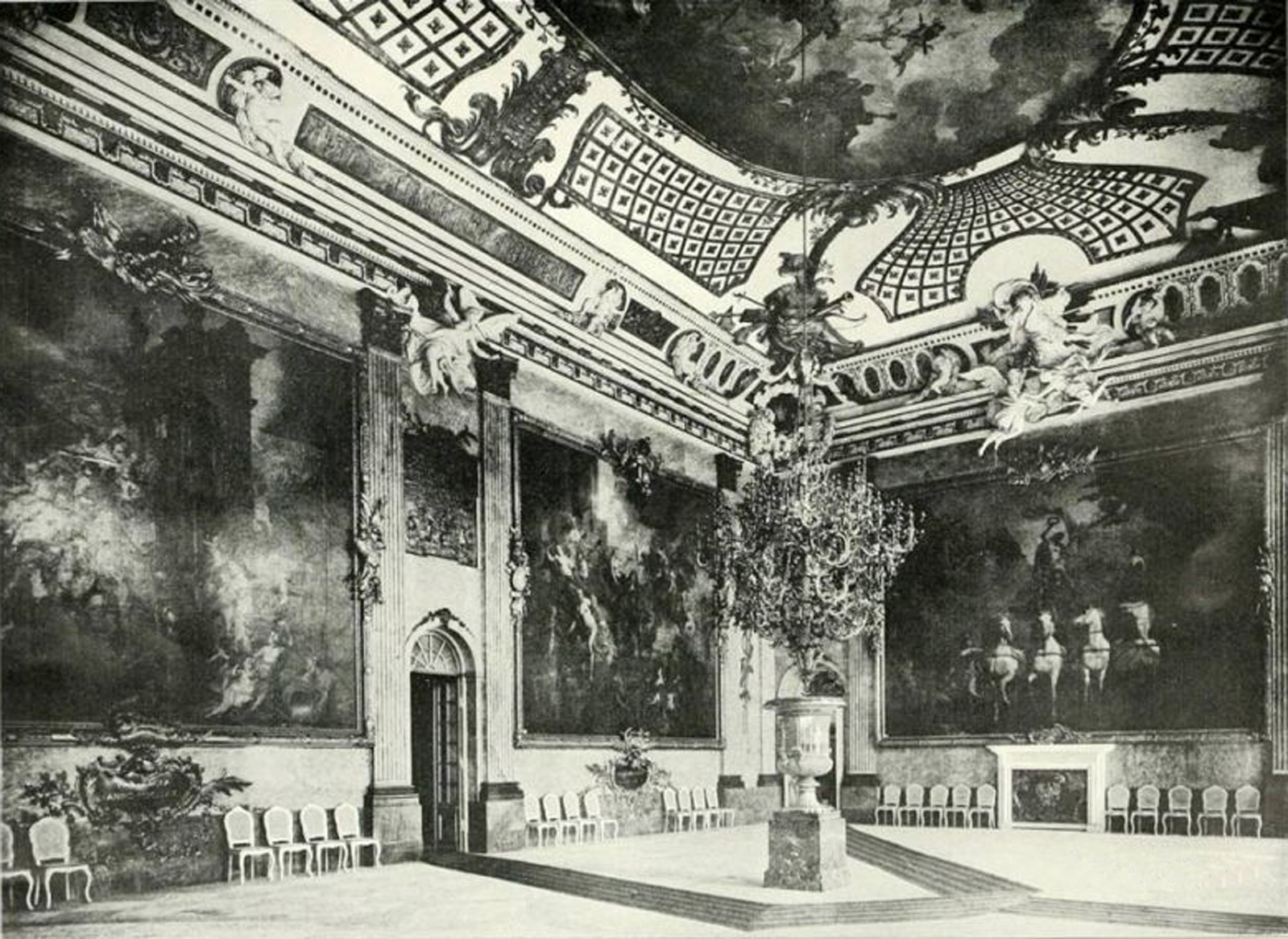
Marble Hall (Marmorsaal), 1912

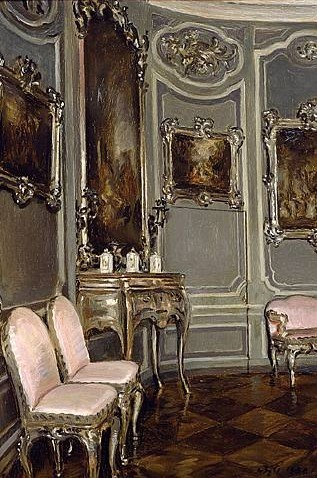
Tea Room, Stadtschloss, Potsdam, 1930

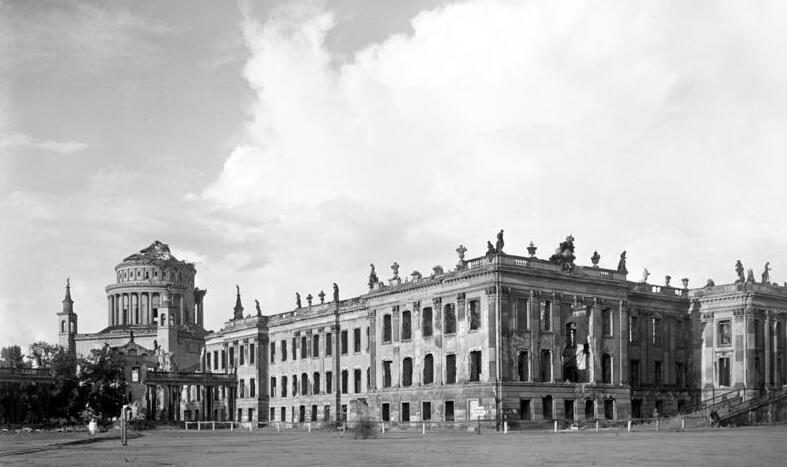
In ruins after World War II

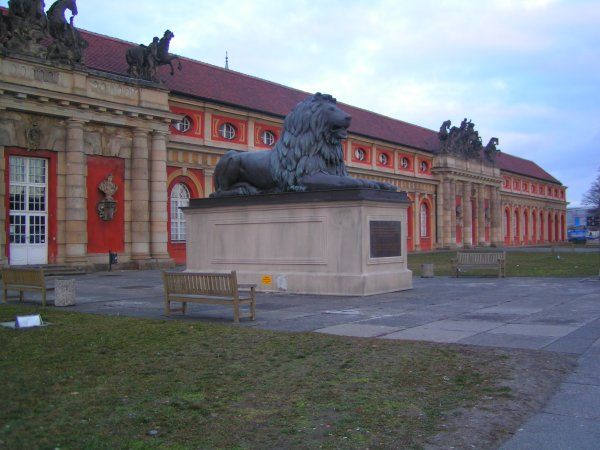
The remaining stables in 2005

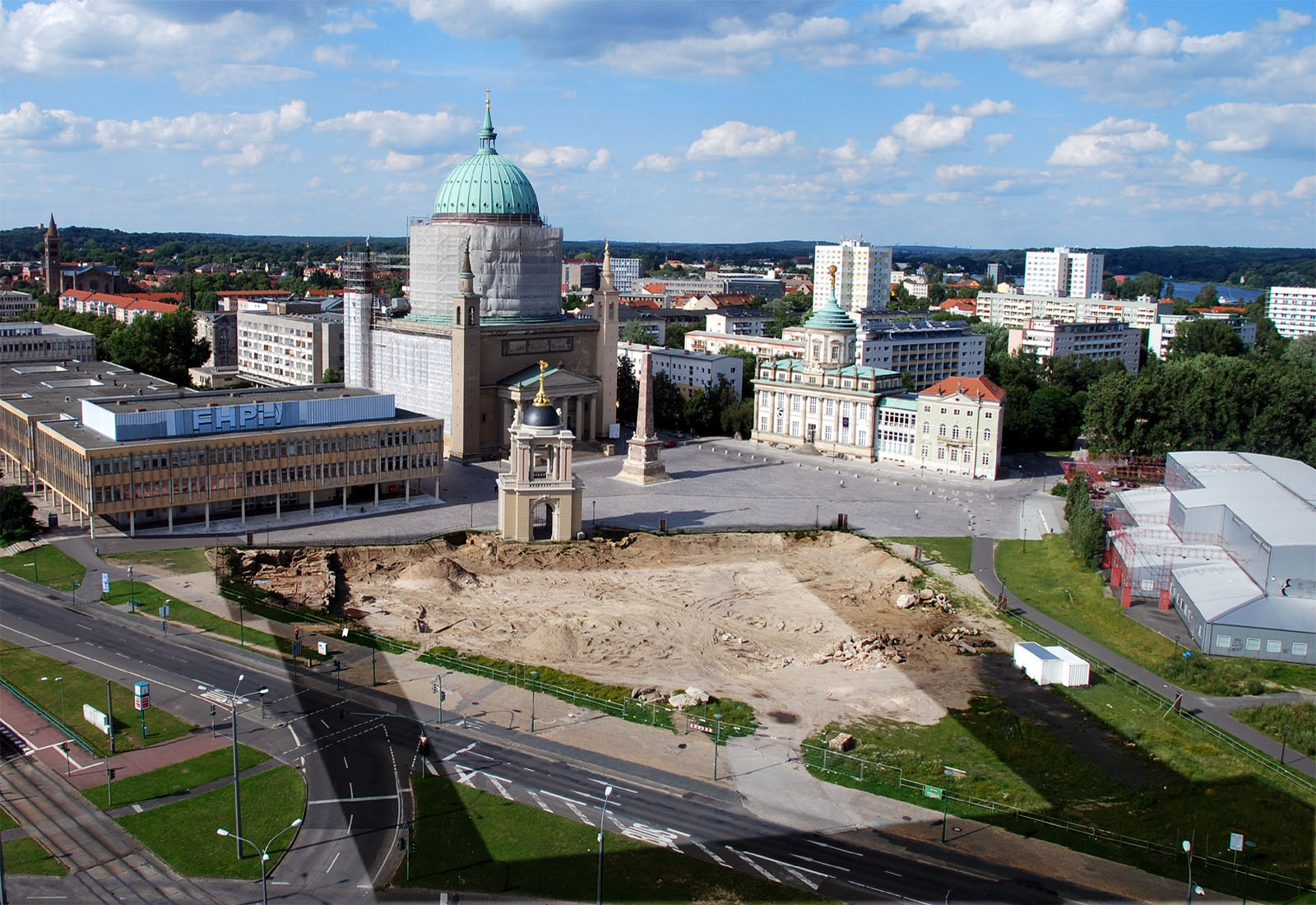
View over the empty Old Market in 2007 with the reconstructed Fortuna Gate

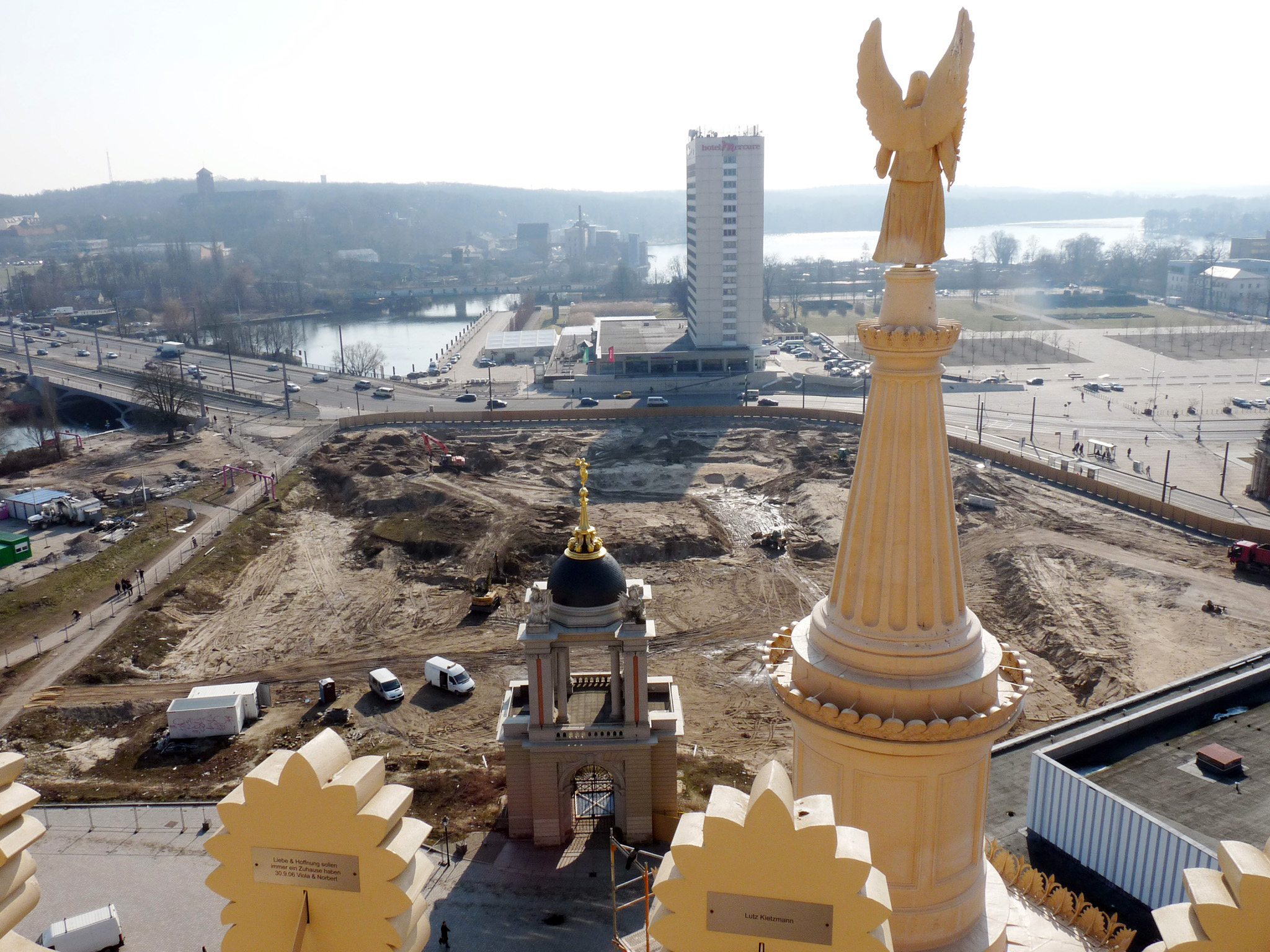
Construction site in 2010

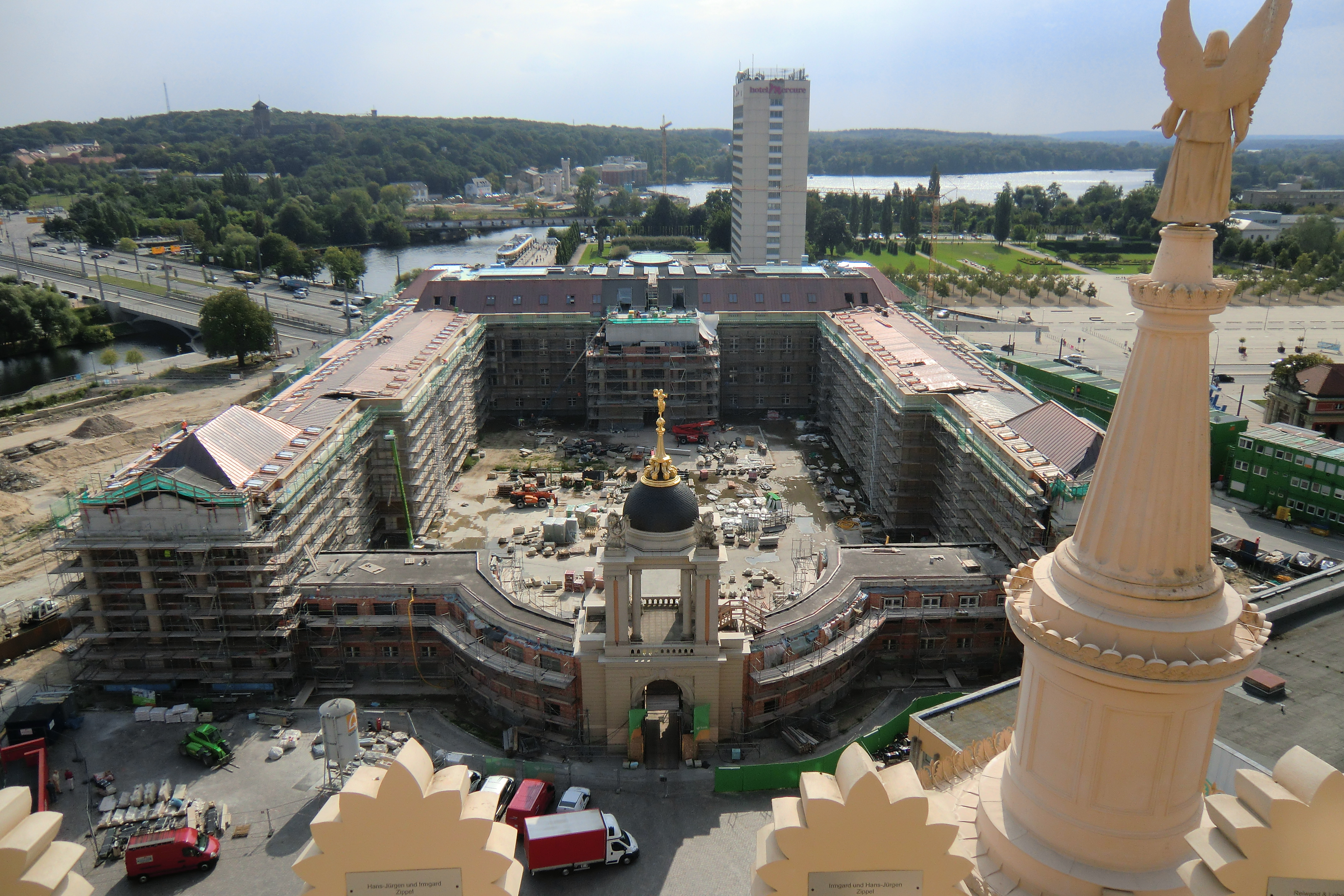
Construction site in 2012

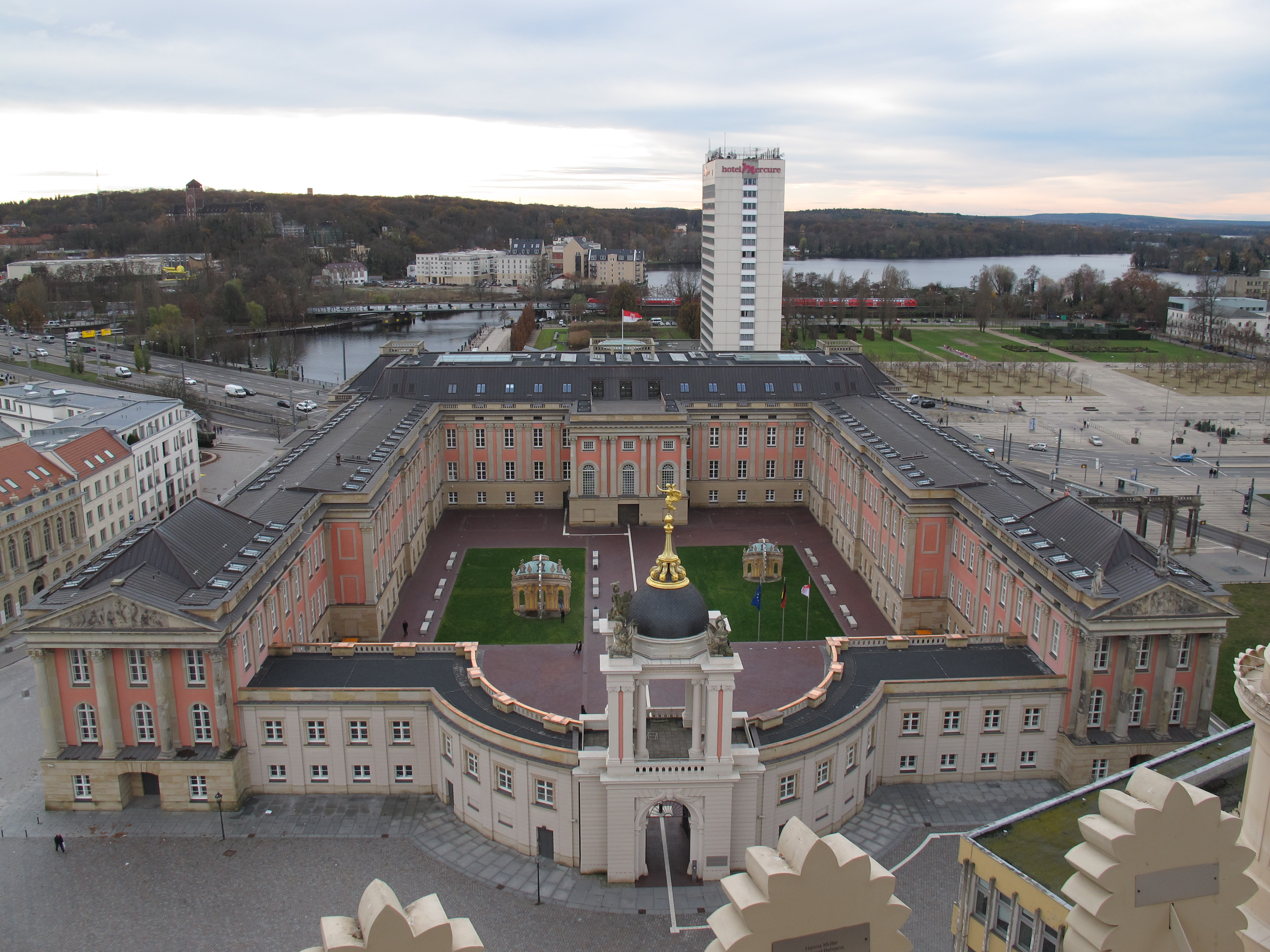
The reconstructed palace in 2016

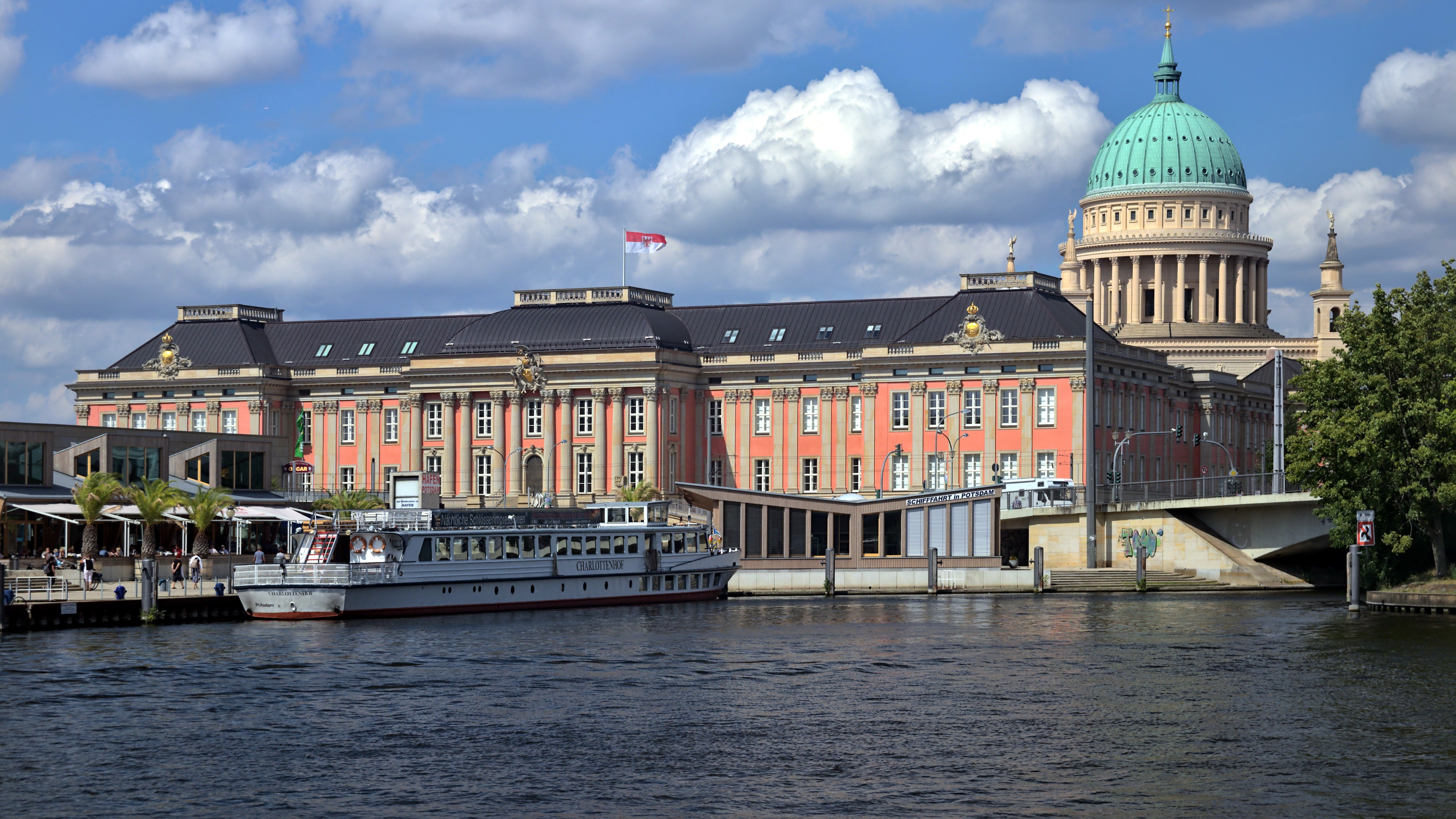
City Palace with St. Nicholas Church

== See also ==
- List of Baroque residences

== Bibliography ==
- Schöne, Michael; Boddien, Wilhelm von (2016). Stadt sucht Mitte : Potsdams Weg zum neuen Stadtschloss (in German). Potsdam: Strauss Edition. ISBN 978-3-943713-26-8. OCLC 967151275.
