= Langer Stall =

Coordinates: 52.395781°N 13.054347°E

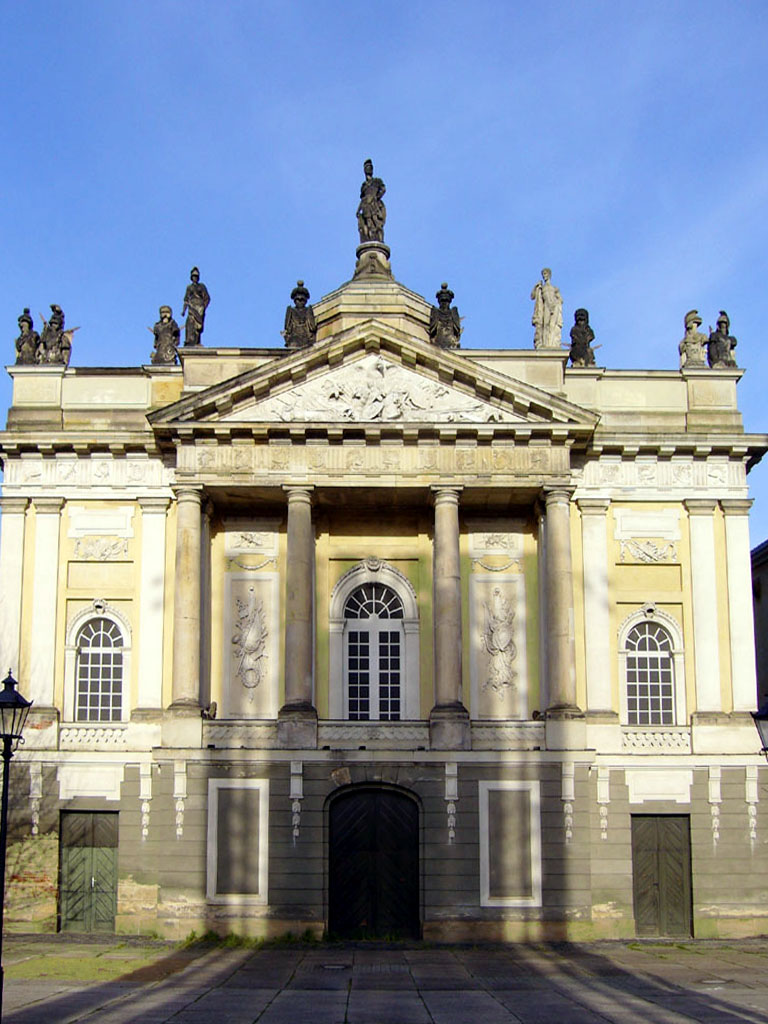
Preserved gate facade of the Langer Stall, 2007

The Lange or Langer Stall (literally Long Stables) was a timber framed riding school and drill hall in Potsdam, built in 1734 under Frederick William I of Prussia. Almost all of it was destroyed in the Second World War, with the only survivor being the gateway facade commissioned by Frederick the Great and designed by Georg Christian Unger.

== History and description ==
=== Context ===
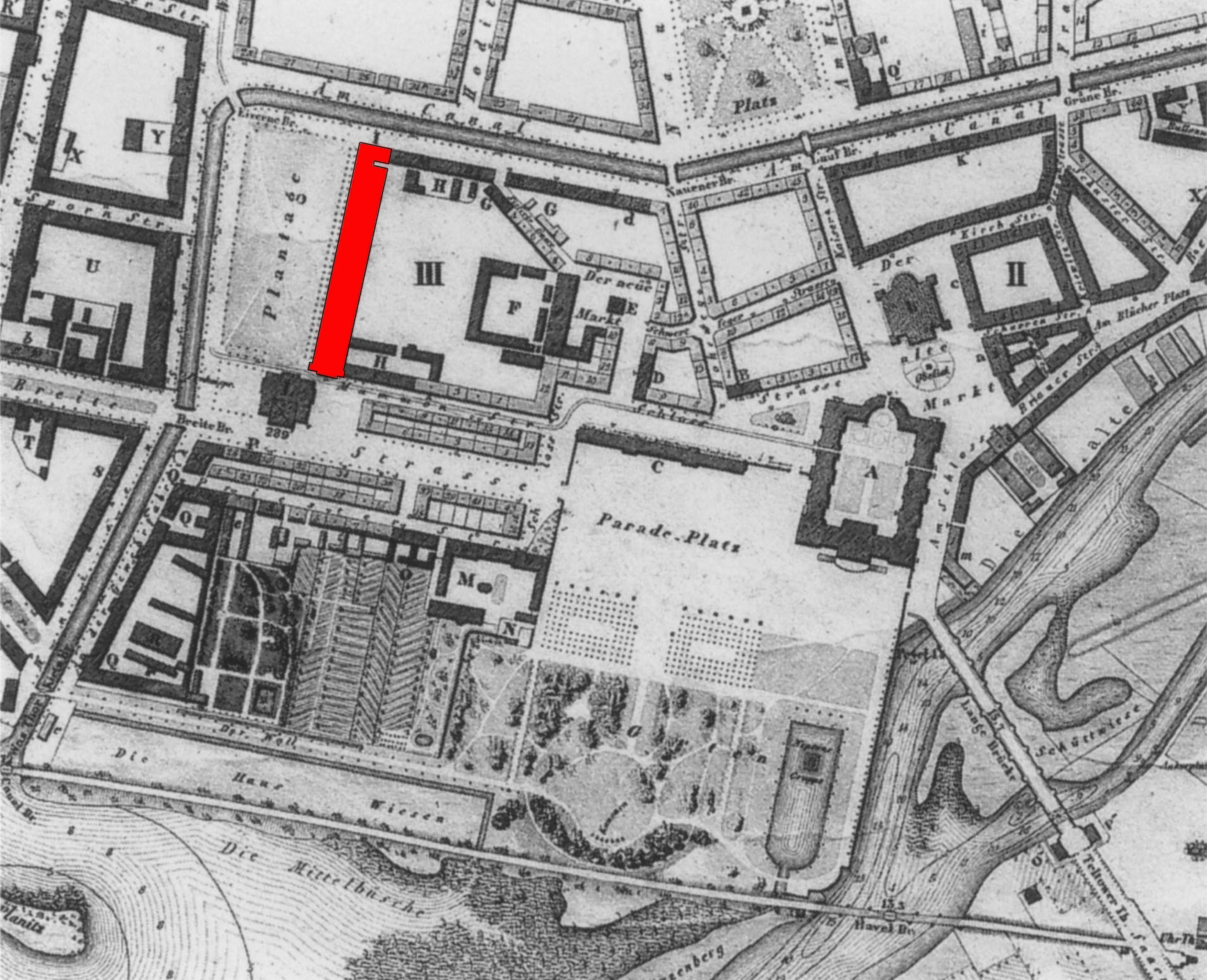
Location in a c.1850 city map.

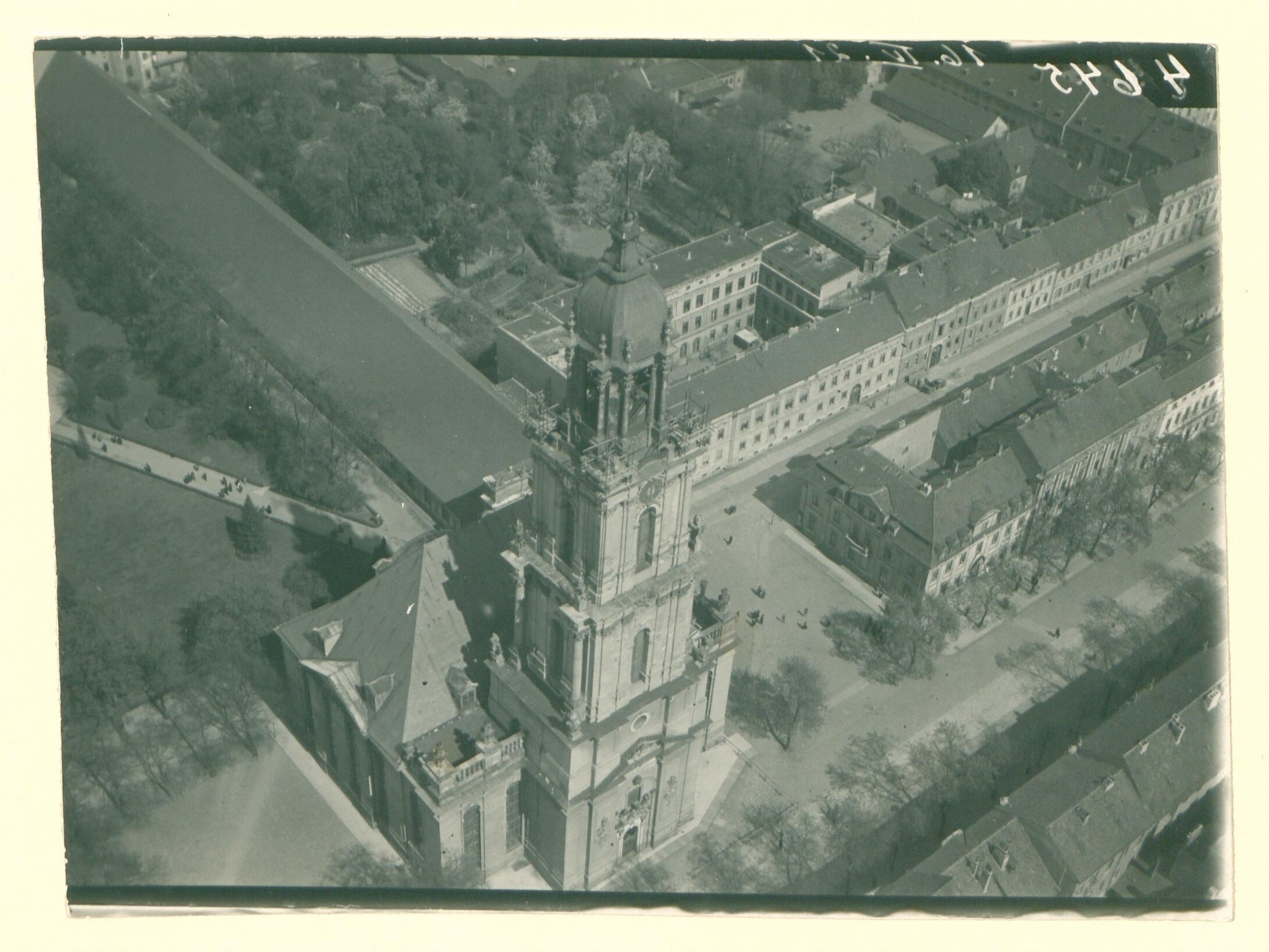
Aerial view of the Garrison Church, with the Lange Stall on the left (1919)

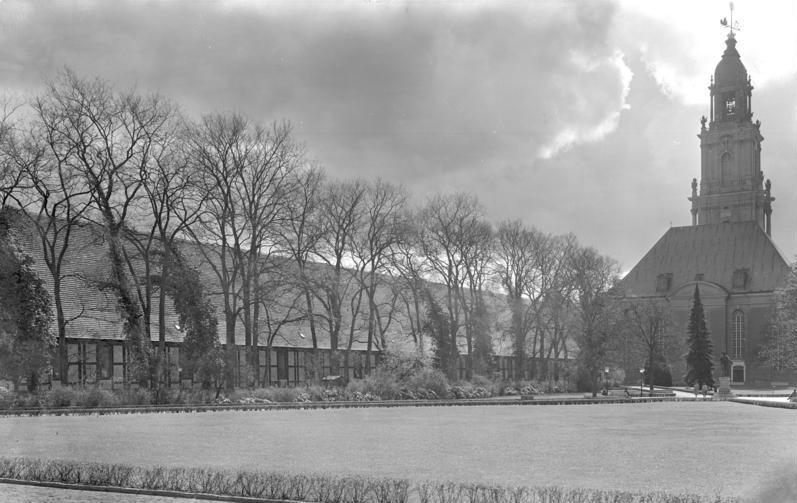
Side view of the Lange Stall from the Plantage, from the north-west, in the background of the Garrison Church.

=== Riding and drill hall ===
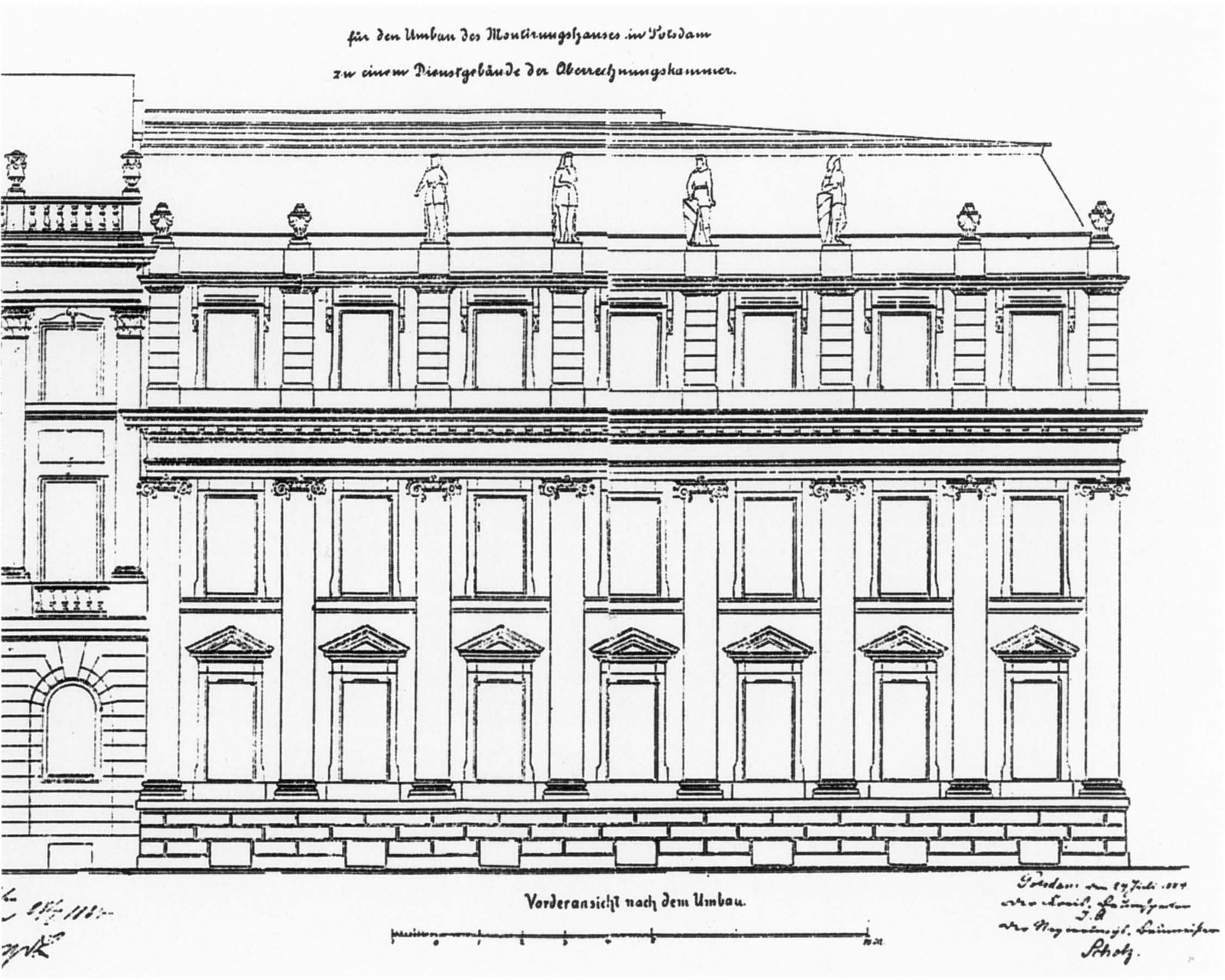
North facade of the Montierungshauses, design for a 1884 rebuild.

=== Southern gate facade ===
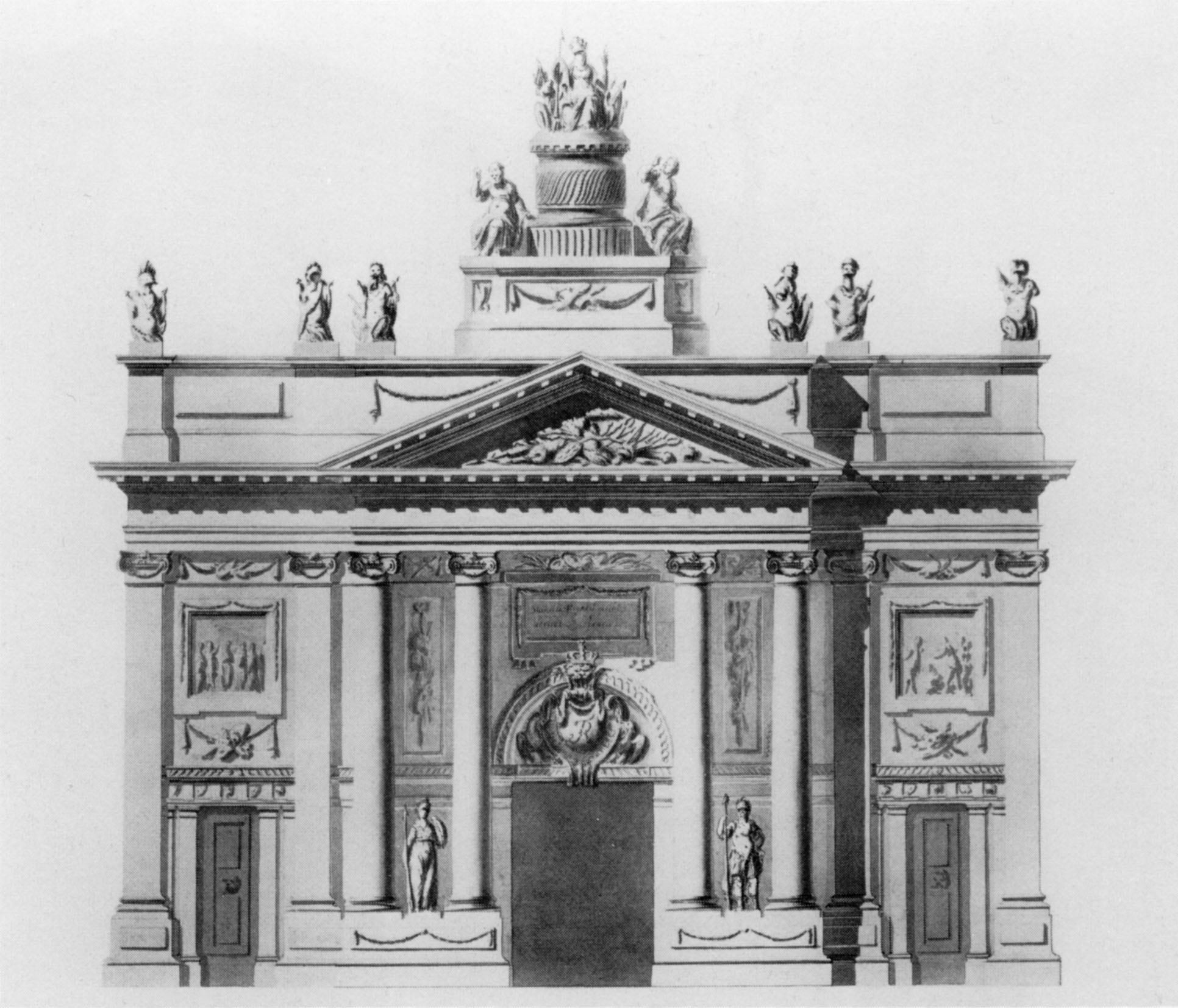
Unrealised design, before 1781

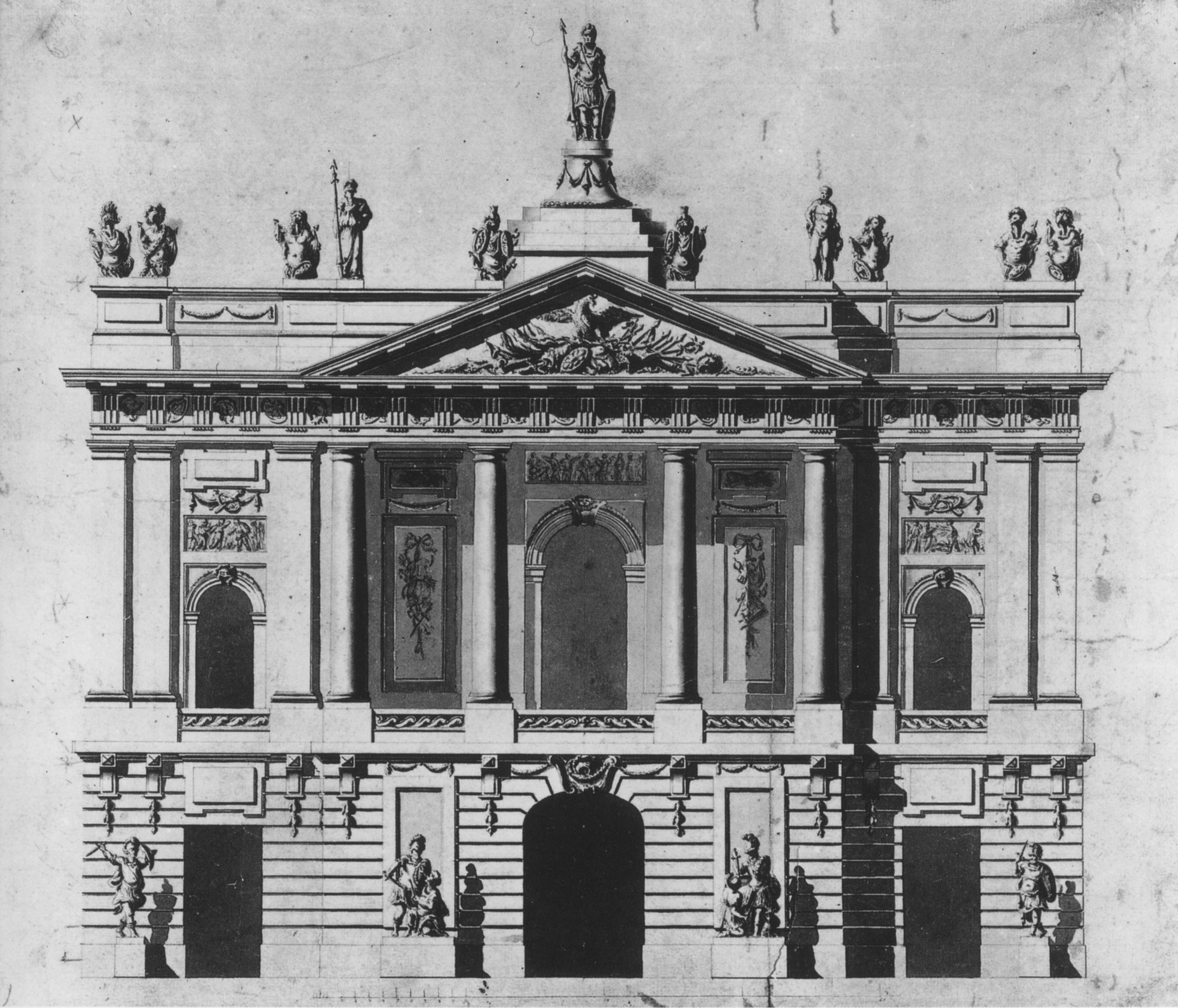
Realised design, 1781

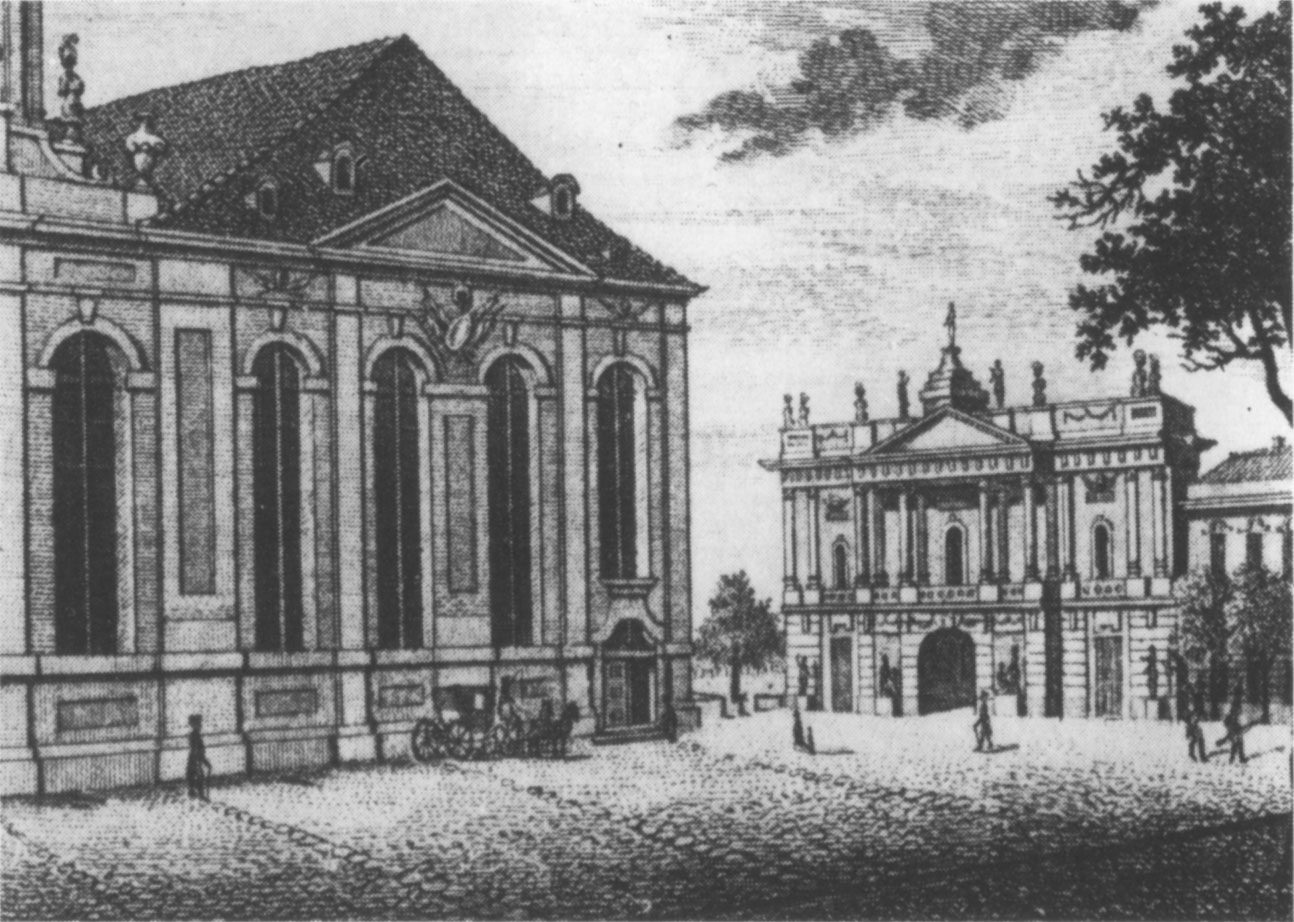
Gateway to the Lange Stall and the Garrison Church und Garrison Church, 1813 etching

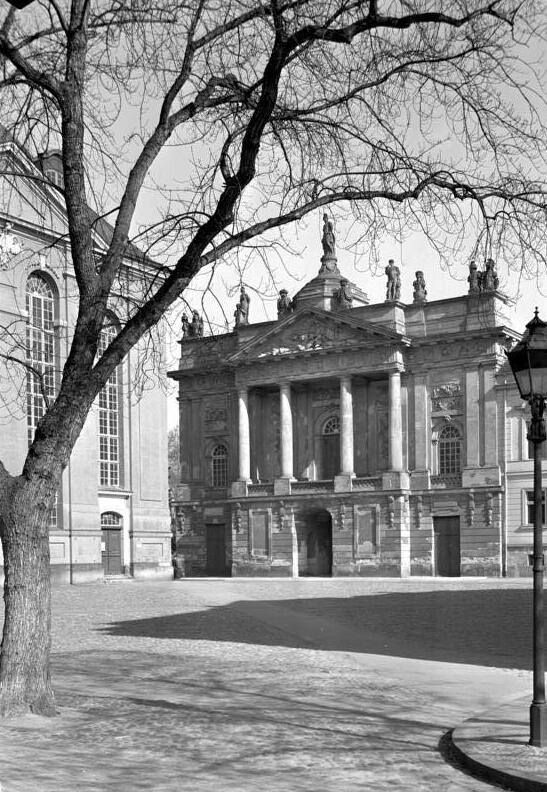
Gateway to the Lange Stall and Garrison Church, 1930

== Destruction and partial reconstruction ==
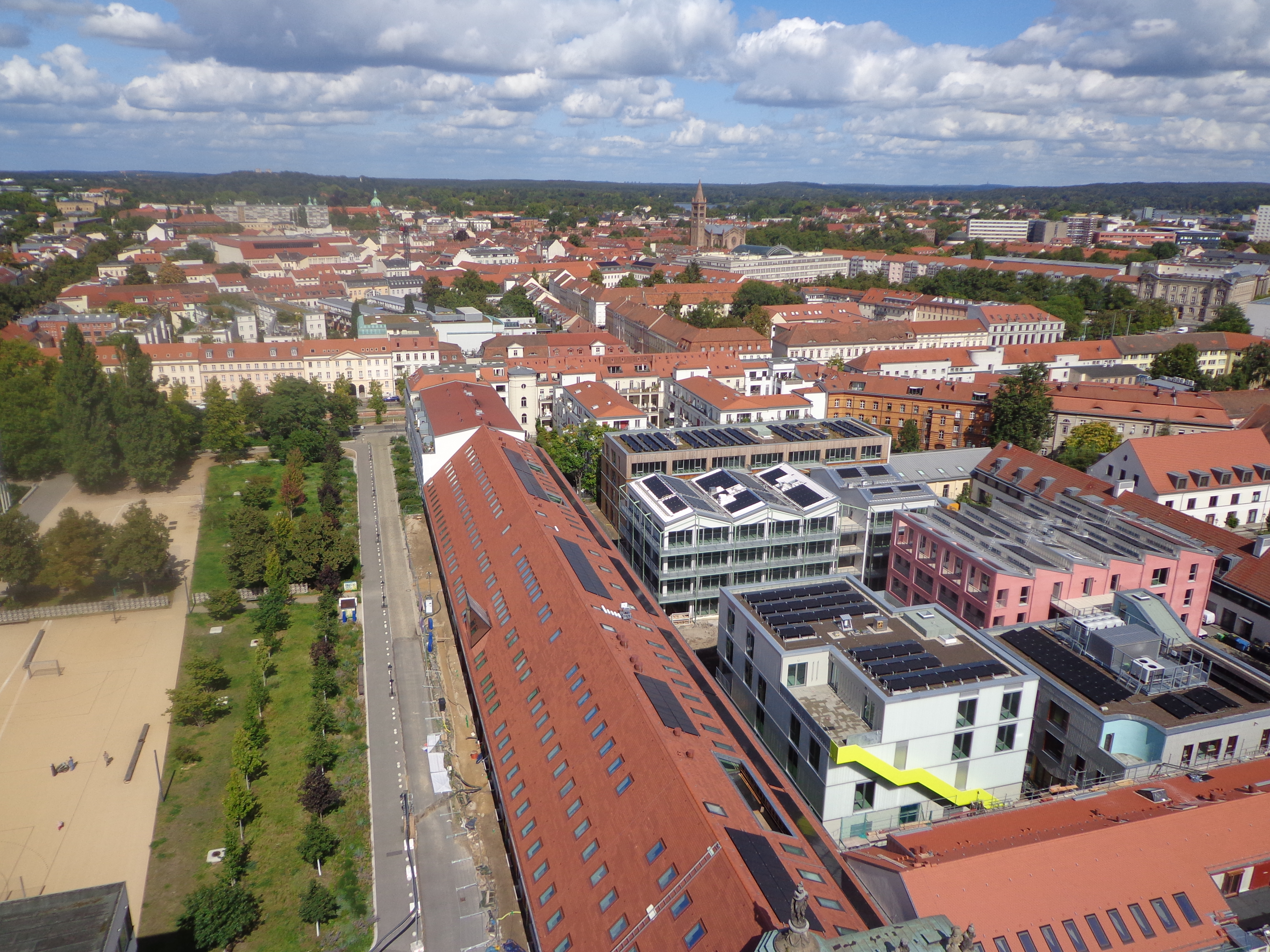
Langer Stall during the reconstruction - on the left the Plantage seen from the tower of the Garrison Church, 2025

During the bombing of Potsdam on the night of 14-15 April 1945 the Langer Stall caught fire, completely destroying the large timber-framed building. The neighbouring Garrison Church was not hit by the bombs, but was ignited by flying sparks from the Stall and also burned down completely.

== Bibliography (in German) ==
- Karin Carmen Jung: Potsdam. Am Neuen Markt. Berlin 1999, ISBN 3-7861-2307-1
- Heinrich Ludwig Manger: Heinrich Ludewig Manger’s Baugeschichte von Potsdam, besonders unter der Regierung König Friedrichs des Zweiten. Zweiter Band, Berlin und Stettin 1789, Reprint Leipzig 1987
- Christian Wendland: Georg Christian Unger. Baumeister Friedrichs des Großen in Potsdam und Berlin. Potsdam 2002, ISBN 3-929748-28-2
