= Garrison Church, Potsdam =

Church building in Potsdam, Germany

Coordinates: 52°23′45″N 13°03′13″E

Garrison Church
- Garnisonkirche
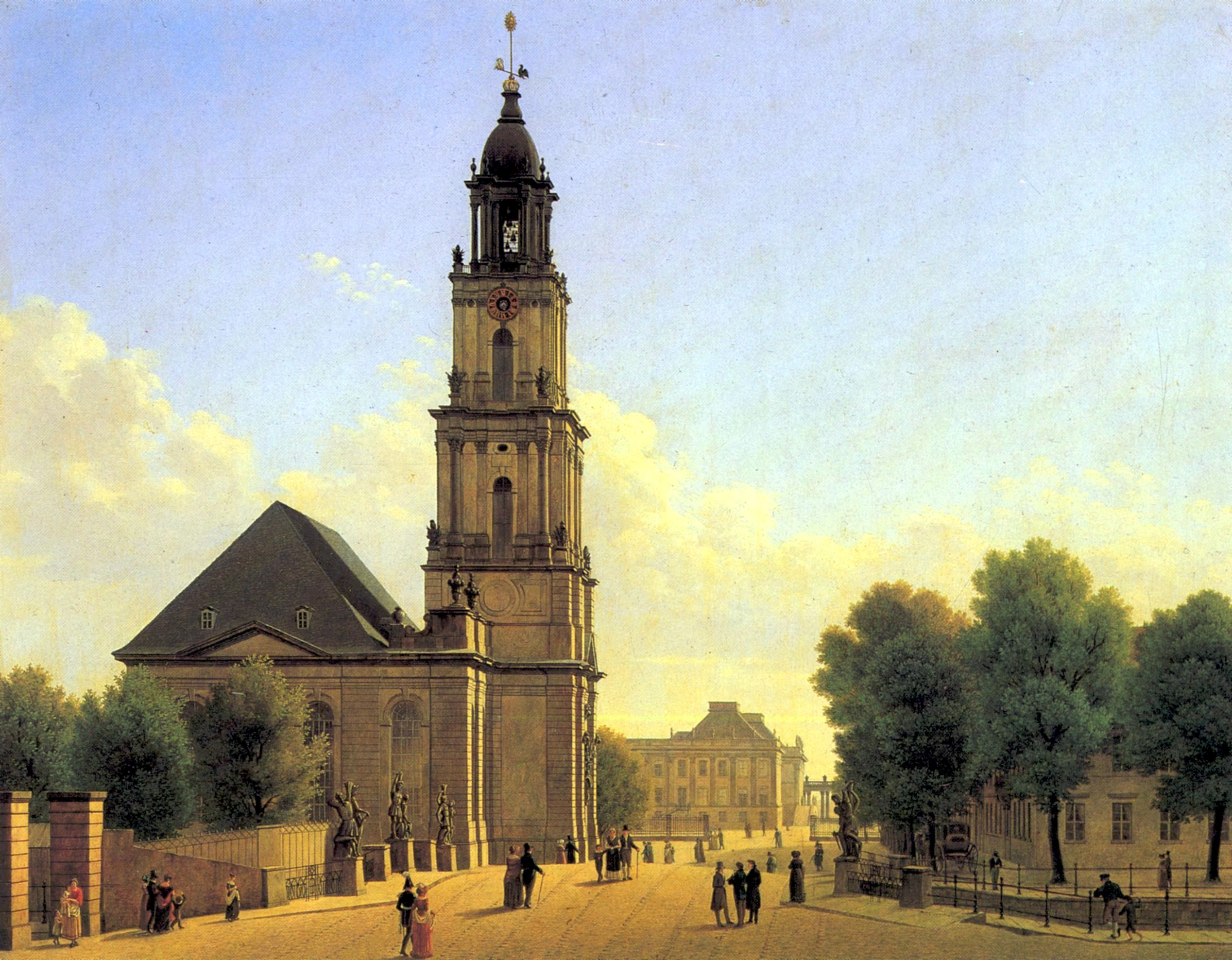
- Garrison Church in 1827
- Interactive map of Garrison Church
- Location: Potsdam
- Designer: Philipp Gerlach
- Height: 88.4 metres (290 ft)
- Beginning date: 1730
- Completion date: 1735
- Dismantled date: 1968

The Garrison Church (German: Garnisonkirche) was a Protestant church in the historic centre of Potsdam. Built by order of King Frederick William I of Prussia according to plans by Philipp Gerlach from 1730 to 1735, it was considered as a major work of Prussian Baroque architecture. With a height of almost 90 metres (295 feet), it was Potsdam's tallest building and shaped its cityscape. In addition, the Garrison Church was part of the city's famous "Three Churches View" together with the St. Nicholas Church and the Holy Spirit Church. After it was damaged during the British bombing in World War II, the East German authorities demolished the church in 1968. After the German reunification, the Garrison Church is currently being rebuilt as a centre for remembrance and reconciliation. The first section opened in 2024, containing a Coventry Cross of Nails chapel, an exhibition about the history of the place and a viewing platform at a height of 57 meters.

The Garrison Church was an important place in the early modern History of Germany. Johann Sebastian Bach, Alexander I of Russia, Napoleon and others visited the building. In addition, it served as burial site of Frederick William I and his son Frederick the Great. Potsdam's first freely elected council members met in the Garrison Church, Lutheran and Reformed Protestants founded the Prussian Union of Churches in it, and classical concerts took place there. In Nazi Germany, the building was used for propaganda purposes; at the same time, many 20 July plotters belonged to the Garrison Church parish.

== Building ==
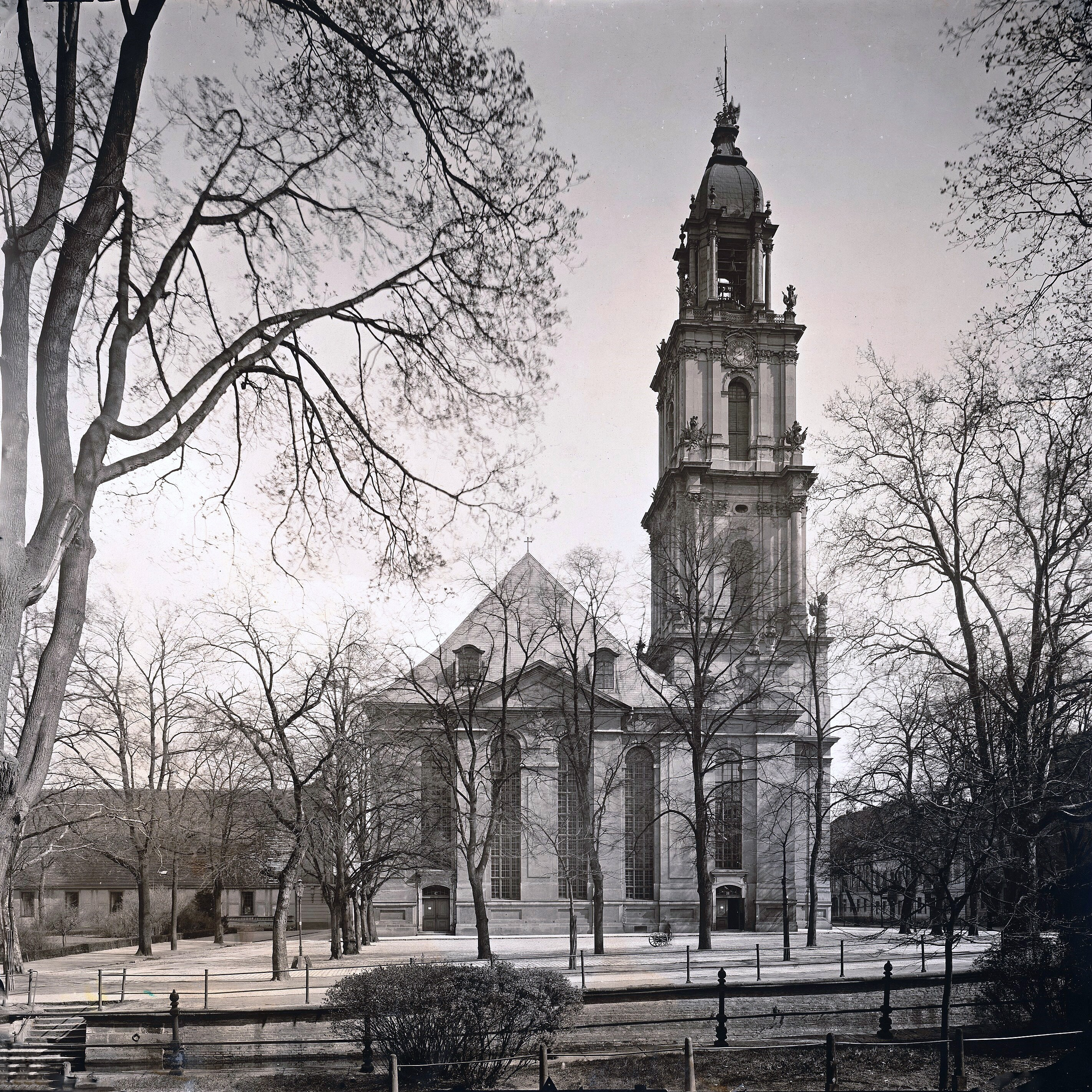
Garrison Church (1920)

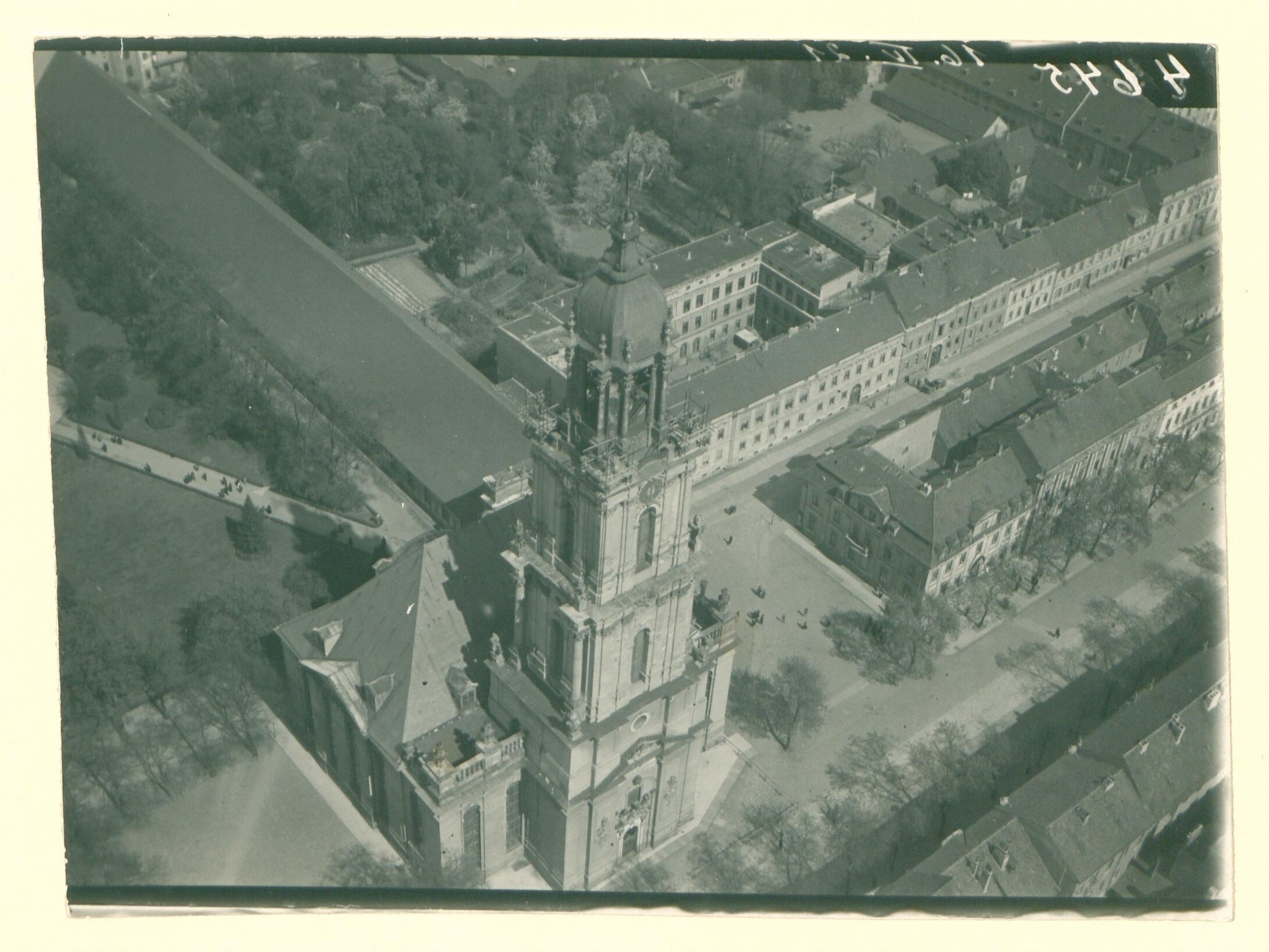
Aerial view of the Garrison Church (1919)

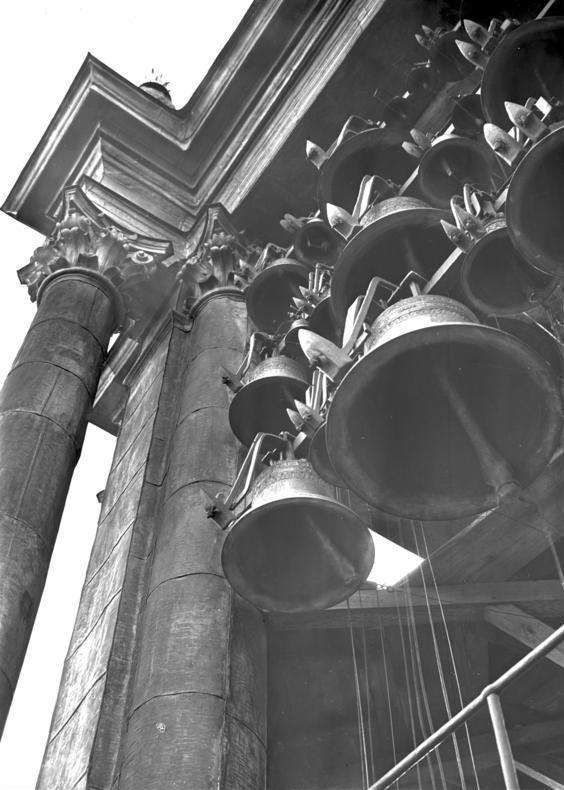
Carillon in the bell tower

=== Bell tower ===
The bell tower of the Garnisonkirche, a dominating structure, measured 88.4 meters and reached well into the street in front of it. Its side walls were interrupted by tall, narrow windows, while sculptures flanked the corners. A panel with gold lettering mounted above the main entrance facing Broad Street (Breiten Straße) read, "Friderich Wilhelm, King of Prussia, had this tower built next to the Garnisonkirchein to the honor of God. Anno 1735". Some of the letters may still be seen today.

The foundation of the bell tower was solidly built and tapered to the upper stories. The top story, built of oak, had lanterns and a copper-covered roof crowned with a weather vane. A carillon, inherited from the first Garrison church consecrated in 1722, was augmented with five new bass tone bells produced by Paul Meurer. Choral music was played on the hour, alternating with secular music played on the half-hour until the end of the 18th century. From 1797 until 1945 the musical order was changed to Bach's Lobet den Herrn, alle Heiden (Praise the Lord, all ye nations) and Üb' immer Treu' und Redlichkeit (Always Be True and Faithful) from Ludwig Hölty, a theme Mozart composed for Papageno's aria, Ein Mädchen oder Weibchen, in The Magic Flute. In between short melodies, some played upon request, rang out over the city every 7.5 minutes.

=== Nave ===
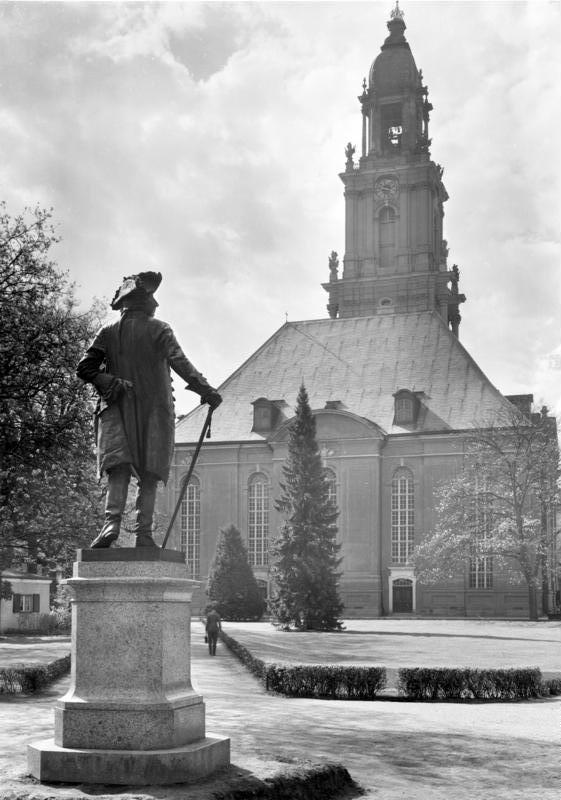
Garrison Church with Plantage, Picture made between 1928 and 1944

The nave was square built. Its cross axis was connected to the bell tower on the north side. A step hip roof, 17 meters high, had two dormer windows built into all but the south side of the roof. Tall round-arched windows dominated the façade which had decorative central portals on all three sides. Entrances on both sides of the tower led to a high balustrade from which it was possible to enter onto a roof walkway. Columned pillars flanked both sides of the main doors which, together with the tower itself, formed an imposing entrance from Broad Street.

=== Interior ===
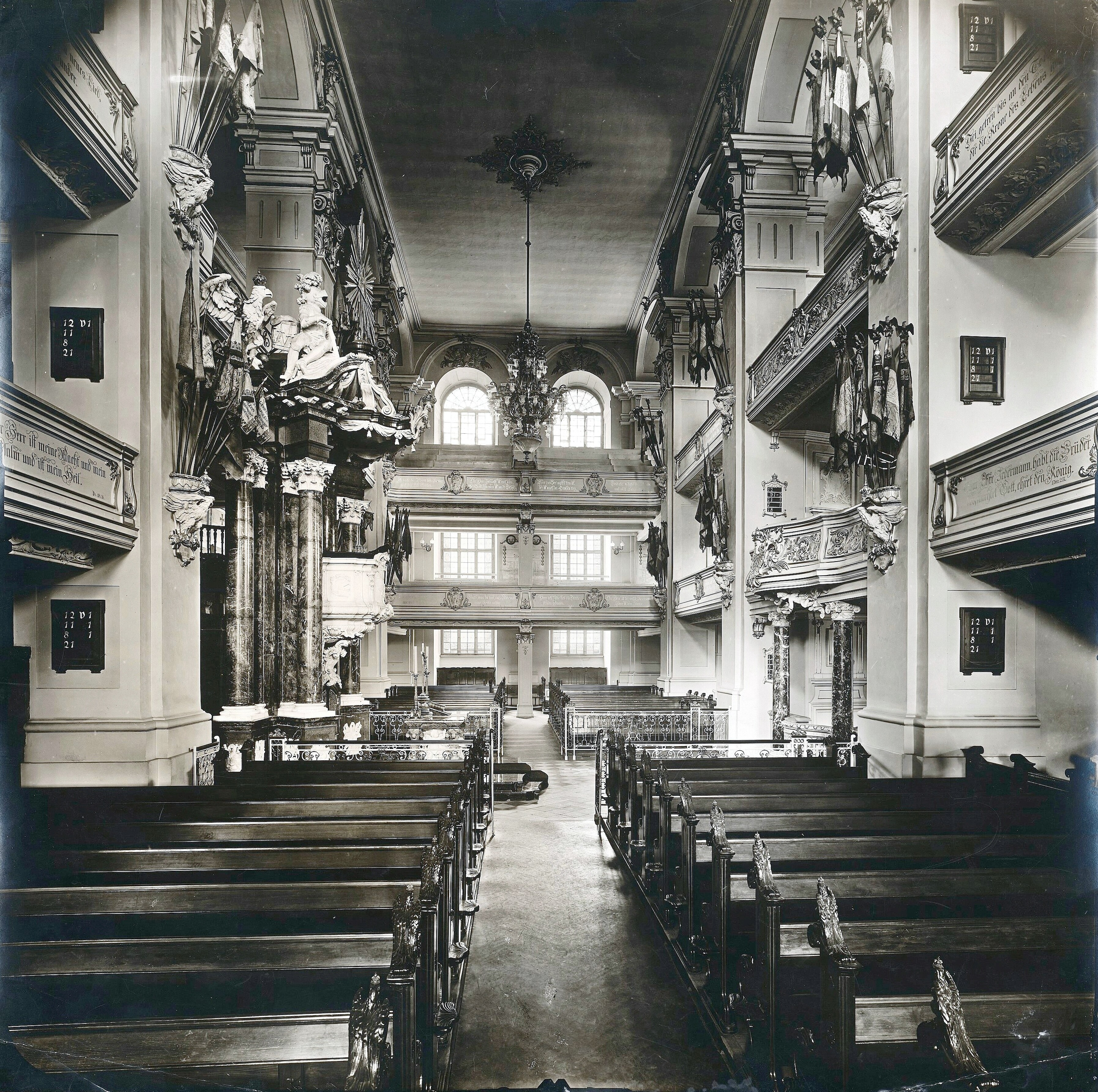
Interior of Garrison Church (1920)

The interior of the Garrison Church was clearly defined. Massive columns connected with solid basket arches supported a flat roof and a two-storeyed emporium. The interior, at first largely without ornamentation, had simple wood panelling, and, while the civilian congregation sat on benches in the nave, the soldiers sat above in the gallery. A wooden pulpit stood on the south side of the nave.

In 1735, Frederick William I had the ground floor crypt built under a new and colorful baroque style high altar with pulpit designed by Christian Friedrich Feldmann (de) and constructed by Johann Christian Angermann and Johann Konrad Koch. The sculptor, Johann Georg Glume (de), created marble figures of Mars and Bellona, which flanked the entrance to the crypt below. Holy Communion was served from the original wooden pulpit, now called the Field Altar.

=== Wagner organ ===
The Garrison church organ, which included a carillon, was built by the organ builder Joachim Wagner in 1731–32 and had 25 registers on 3 manuals with pedals. These were later increased to 42 registers by his colleague, Carl Ludwig Gesell (de), in 1862. The organ was further modernized by Wilhelm Sauer during extensive interior renovations carried out from 1897 to 1899. He re-used approximately half of the original historical organ pipes for the new late-romantic style organ, increased the number of registers to 46 and changed the mechanics to a pneumatic action system. The organ was unusually placed and stood over the chancel on the second balcony. It had an imposing casing with richly carved ornamentation and sculptural details thought to be designed by the Johann Glume. The prospect, or organ pipes, were arranged in three towers, each with six groups of pipes, the longest of which was 5 meters. Some of the pedal registers were housed in the middle tower for lack of space. Remarkable but suitable for a military church, the organ had chimes imitating trombones and kettledrums mounted on angels. A circling sun and a wing-beating eagle completed the decor. Thanks to a generous donation from the mail order house founder, Werner Otto, it has been possible to rebuild the Wagner organ based on existing documents.

== History ==
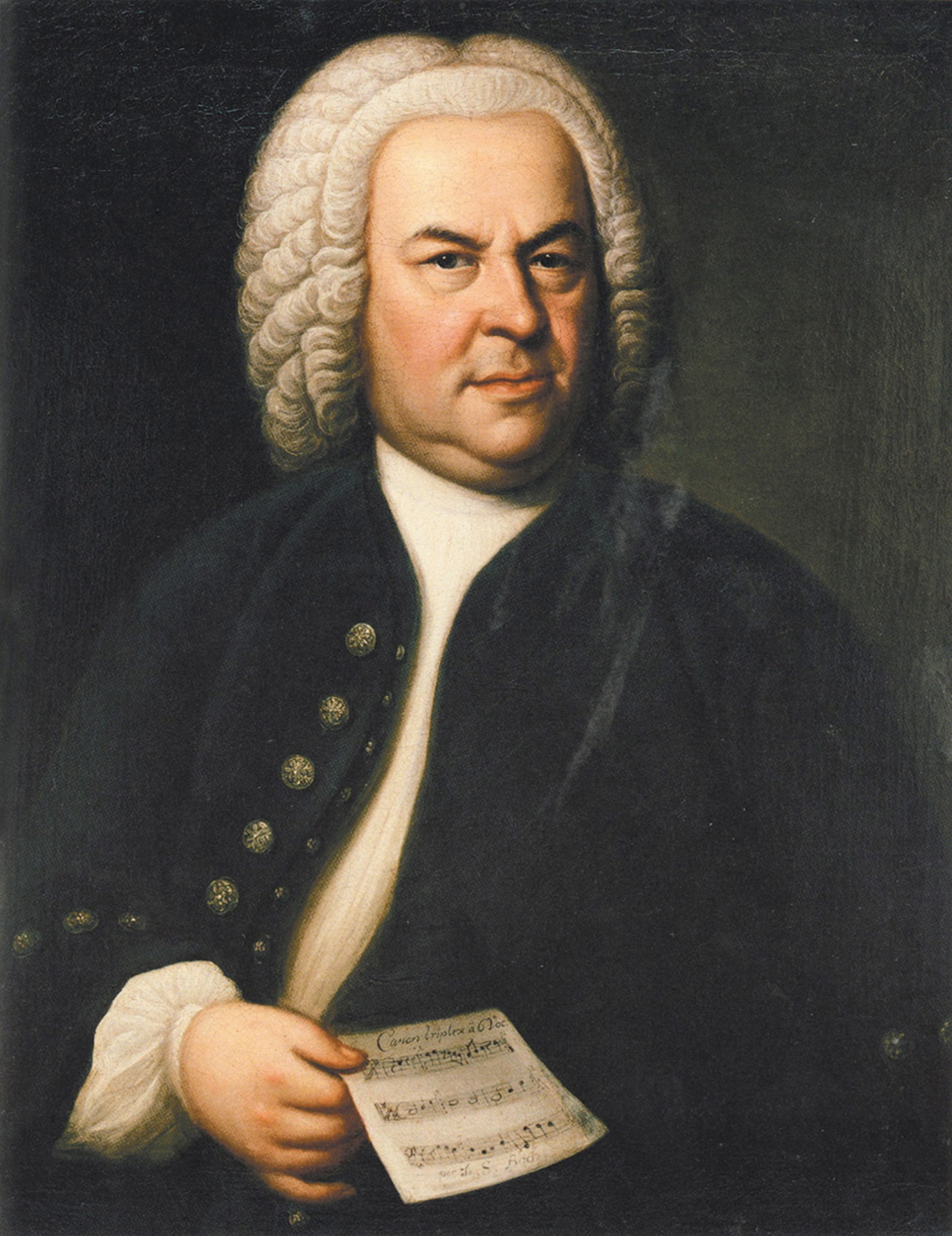
Johann Sebastian Bach played the organ of the Garrison Church in 1747

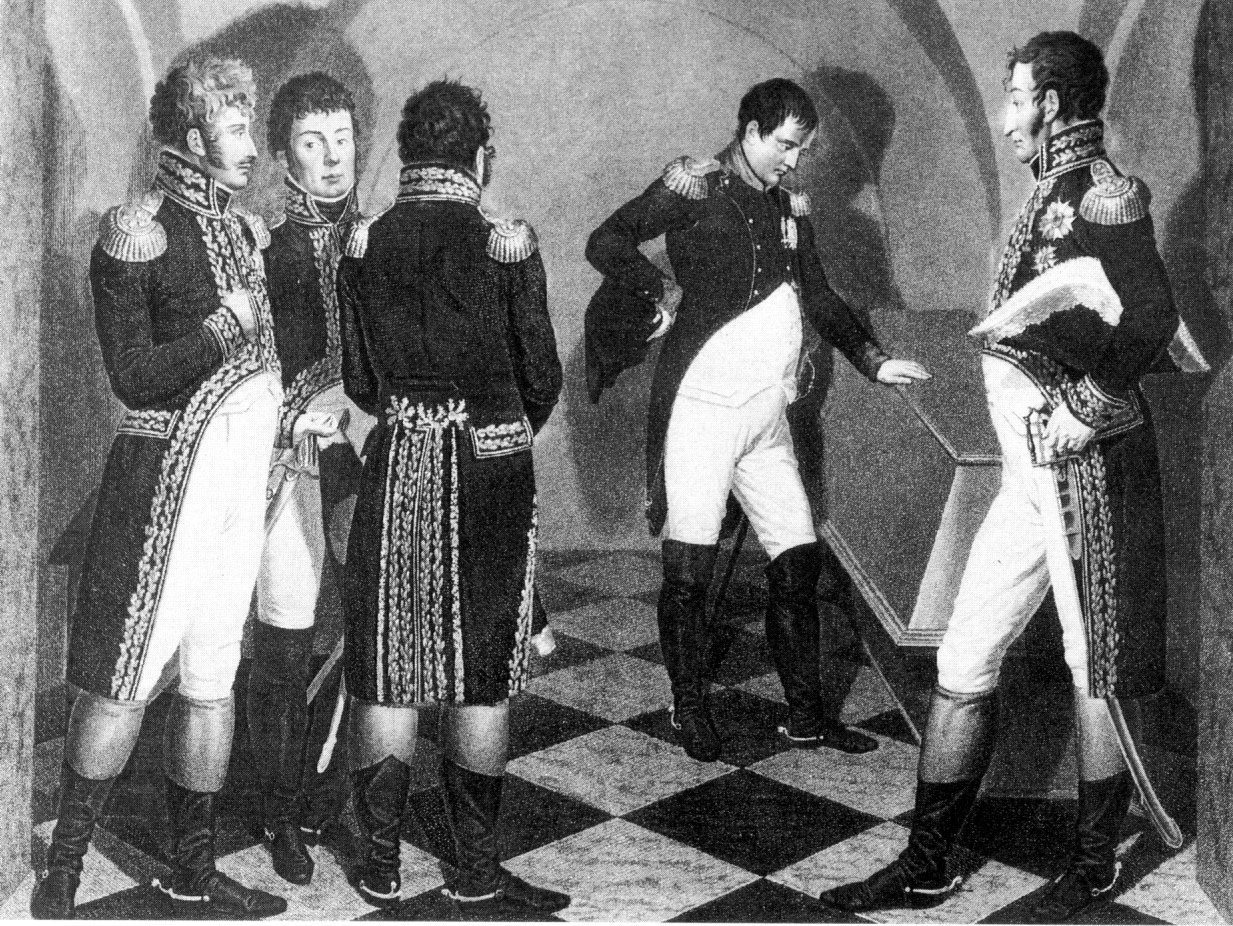
Napoleon visited the tomb of Frederick the Great in 1806

=== First building ===
From 1720 to 1722, the first Potsdam Garrison Church was a square half-timbered building built on the same spot as the later version we know of today. It had a steep pavilion roof and a two-storey tower which housed a 35 tone carillon built by the Amsterdam organ builder Jan Albert de Grave (nl). Soldiers, most of whom were members of the royal regiment 'Potsdam Giants', made up the congregation and regularly attended German Reformed Church services there.

=== Second building, Garrison Church ===
After only a few years, cracks appeared in the walls, and the building began to tilt due to the marshy land beneath and insufficient foundations. In 1730, the carillon had to be removed and the church and tower were torn down. Since King Frederick William I was interested in the well-being of his soldiers and wanted them instructed in church customs, he commissioned the architect Philipp Gerlach to plan a new church. Construction began in 1731, and on 17 August 1732, the church was consecrated by the court chaplain, Christian Johann Cochius, and the military chaplain, Johann Gottfried Hornejus. As with almost all the churches he commissioned in Potsdam and Berlin, the king wanted the Garrison Church to have a high, imposing and solidly built tower as proof of his firm belief in God. In 1730, and again in 1734, he had experienced the collapse of the nearly completed tower of the St. Peter's Church (de) in Berlin. So it was with great gratitude that he was able to climb the 365 steps to the top of the Garrison Church bell tower in August 1735, soon after recovering from severe illness.

=== Dedication until the Weimar Republic ===
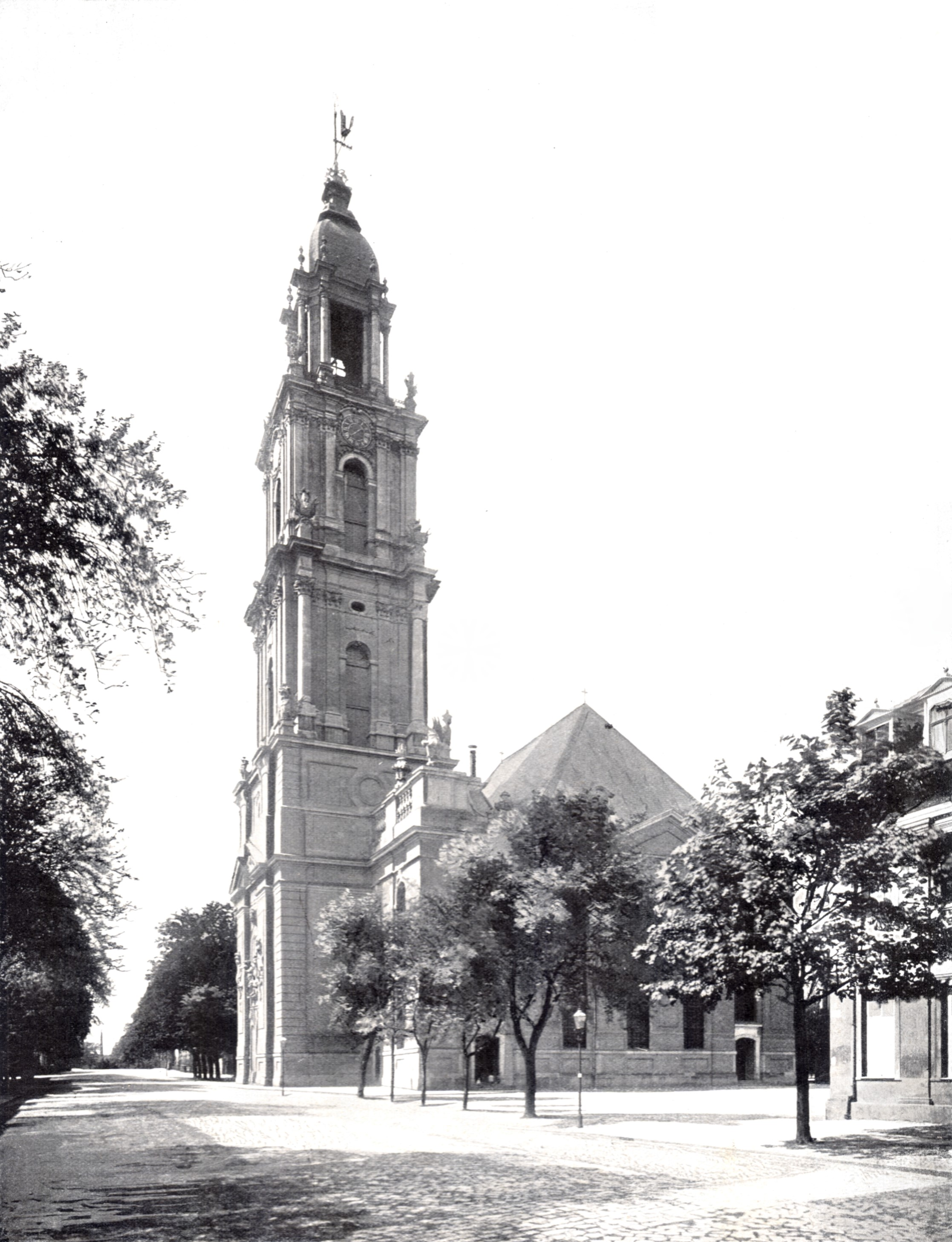
The Garrison Church around 1900

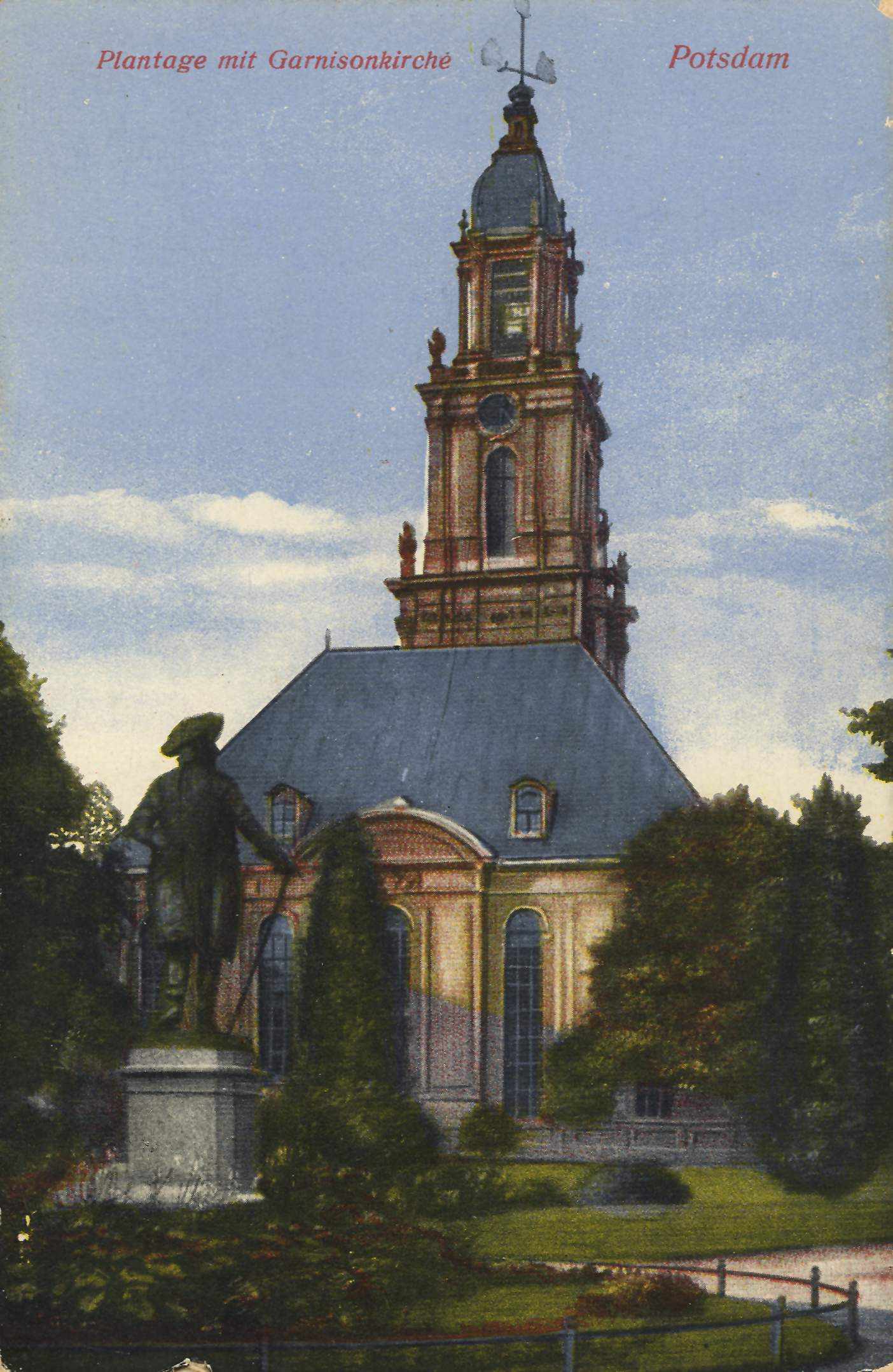
The Garrison Church with Plantage around 1900

In 1735, Frederick William I ordered a crypt to be built under the main altar of the Garrison Church. Five years later he was buried there a day after his death on 31 May 1740. His successor, Frederick II, invited Johann Sebastian Bach to visit Potsdam. Bach played the organ at the Garrison Church and declared it to be a "very fine work". Sophia Dorothea, wife of Frederick William I, who died on 28 June 1757, decreed in her testament that she wished to be buried in the Hohenzollern Crypt of the Berlin Cathedral, so that her space in the Garrison Church remained free. Her son, Frederick II, also did not designate it as his burial place, preferring instead to be interred on the terrace in front of Sanssouci in Potsdam. Contrary to his wish, he was buried alongside his father on the day of his death, 18 August 1786. His funeral ceremony, however, took place later on 9 September 1786. At the request of Queen Louise in 1797, the choral Lobe den Herrn, meine Seele (Praise the Lord, my soul) was played on the carillon each hour, followed on the half-hour by Üb' immer Treu' und Redlichkeit (using the aria melody Ein Mädchen oder Weibchen from Mozart's The Magic Flute). Previously the pieces were simply alternated as was the custom in Holland. In November 1805, the Russian Tsar Alexander I was invited by King Frederick William III and Queen Louise to meet in the royal crypt to celebrate the consolidation of their alliance against Napoleon. On 25 October 1806, after his victory over the Prussian Army at Jena–Auerstedt, Napoleon marched to Berlin and Potsdam and requested to visit Frederick II's private apartment in the Berlin Palace and the royal crypt in the Garrison Church, respectively. His comment that he would probably not have been there had Frederick II still been alive most likely was not said at the crypt as is so often stated, but, out of respect for Frederick II, Napoleon placed the Garrison Church under his personal protection, while he appropriated both the French Church (de) and the Church of the Holy Spirit (de) to stable his cavalry.

Another reason why the Garrison Church played such an important role in the history of Potsdam was because the first freely elected Potsdam Magistrate was inaugurated there on 3 August 1809.

In 1816, in order to make room for flags at the victory celebration of the War of Liberation against the French Army, the figures of Mars and Bellona in the Garrison Church were moved to the staircase of the City Palace. The church balustrade railings were draped in red and gold fabric and hung with commemorative plaques for the soldiers who had fallen in battle. On 31 October 1817, the first ecumenical service of the Reformed Calvinist and Lutheran Churches was performed on the occasion of the 300th anniversary of the Reformation.

Frederick William IV, while still the crown prince, began making designs for the modernization of the Garrison Church. He suggested building a five-sided basilica ten times the size of the existing church, which was never realized. The only change made during his reign was the addition of a 10-sided christening chapel in the southwest vestibule (1886), followed by renovation work in the nave (also 1886), and repair work on the tower. Later a new "wilhelminische" interior, designed and realized by Friedrich Laske. It was characterized by the representational style popular at the time and featured newly arranged cypress wood pews, and richly decorated paneling. The balustrade railings were embellished with molding and decorative elements (cartouches) embossed with gold. Friedrich Laske was also responsible for new architectural demands such as fire protection, heating, lighting, and improved of visibility from the balconies. The number of war trophies rose to 117 French flags, 25 Danish flags and 7 Austrian banners. Organ registers were increased from 42 to 46 while the organ pipes remained unchanged. In 1907, a wrought iron gate was added to the tower entrance, and in 1910 Kaiser Wilhelm II donated a splendid altar table, ending an era of considerable embellishment.

According to Article 245 of the Versailles Treaty, the French trophies should have been returned to France, but in July 1919, they were removed by persons unknown and, to this day, have never been found. They were replaced by flags of the now defunct Prussian regiments. The role of the Garrison Church, long known for fostering church music, had been neglected and was reestablished in the 20th century largely by Professor Otto Becker, who served as organist and performed on the carillon and organ from 1910 until 1945. During this period over 2000 carillon and organ concerts, oratories, religious concerts and chamber music concerts were performed in the Garrison Church. Prof. Becker also served as organist in Potsdam's synagogue from 1915 until 1933.

From 1925 until 1930 the architect Karl Daubitz undertook wide-ranging repair work documented by hundreds of drawings and photos which still exist.

=== Nazi era until destruction ===
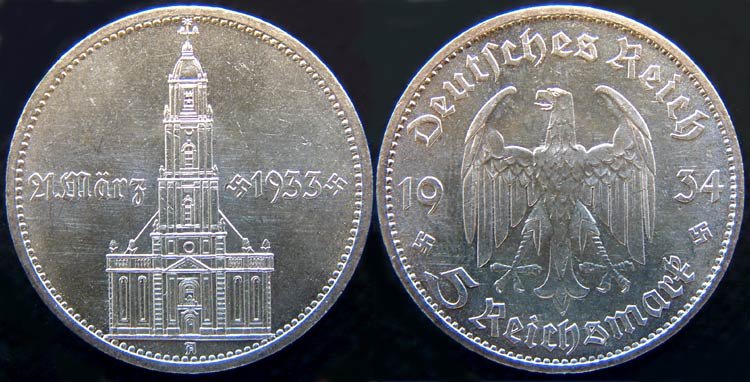
Germany – 3rd Reich, 5 Reichsmark 1934 – A (Berlin, w/date). Potsdam Garrison Church with "Day of Potsdam" date, celebrating the reconvening of the new "Reichstag" parliament – 21 March 1933.

The Nazis hoped for a majority of votes in the parliamentary elections held under an extremely uncertain climate of judicial insecurity and violence on 5 March 1933. Their plan was to dissolve Parliament to pave the way for dictatorship. Already on the eve of the burning of the Reichstag the idea to celebrate the reopening of Parliament in the Garrison Church was born. On 2 March the plan was approved and six days later 21 March was decided as the celebration date. After protests from church authorities and the President of Parliament, it was agreed that only the opening ceremony would be held in the Garrison Church. The official opening meeting was to take place next door in the "Langen Stall". For lack of time this plan too was reversed, and the Kroll Opera became the venue for the event. The intentionally-chosen date fell on the anniversary of the opening of the first Reichstag Parliament by Kaiser Wilhelm I in the White Salon in the Berlin Palace on 21 March 1871. This time Parliamentary President Paul von Hindenburg was seen by many as a substitute for the Kaiser, allowing Hitler's "Machtergreifung" to become a symbol of a Prussian conservative rebirth of the nation ("Wiedergeburt der Nation"). The deal was sealed by a handshake between the Chancellor, Hitler, and the President, Paul von Hindenburg. A famous photograph of it by the American (N.Y. Times) photographer, Theo Eisenhard, became the media icon of the day. Yet the handshake represented no more and no less than Hitler's dismissal of Hindenburg. Two and five Reichsmark coins showing the church were minted in 1934–35. All of the two and some of the five carry the commemorative date, "21 März 1933". These coins remain available at modest prices.

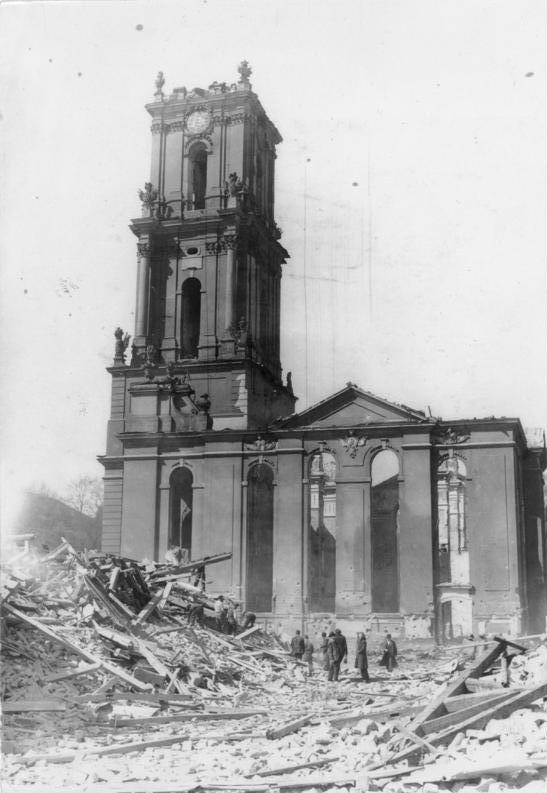
Ruin in April 1945

National Socialist leadership led Germany into the World War II, which left Potsdam heavily damaged. For fear of bombardments, the coffins of Frederick II and his father, Frederick William I, were removed from the Garrison Church in 1943 and placed in a bunker in today's German Army Command Centre in Potsdam. After the British bombings on 14 and 15 April 1945, it looked as though the church had remained unscathed, but on the 15th the Lange Stall next door took a direct hit, and the ensuing fire storm entered the church through windows broken by the bombing the night before. The fire destroyed the wooden galleries and the roof before it entered the tower, where wooden ventilation shutters needed for the carillon mechanism allowed the fire to spread quickly. Damage to water pipes and low water pressure resulting from the bombings made it impossible for fire hoses to reach the source of the blaze. Firemen could only watch helplessly as first the tower burned from top to bottom followed by the wooden beams in the church nave. Only the crucifix, chandeliers and the altar table could be saved before the enormous heat caused an unexploded ordnance to detonate. One by one the carillon bells loosened and fell nearly 80 meters to the ground until finally the oaken roof of the tower also collapsed, ending the long existence of Potsdam's most famous musical instrument. Only the ruined outside walls of the church and a stump of its tower remained.

The congregation, now much reduced in number, managed to maintain ownership of the land belonging to the Garrison Church Potsdam after negotiating with local government authorities. Aside from the church ruin, the parish hall and two further dwellings were in desolate condition and, with help from both Church and State institutions, every effort was made to repair them. On 25 July 1949, the parish council decided to rename the church Holy Crucifix Church in order to free it and its parishioners from the burden of Prussian militarism and mark the beginning of a new era dedicated to awareness of sin and Christ's suffering. Within the year the Holy Crucifix congregation moved into a chapel built within the ruins of the bell tower. Two newly-cast bells rang to announce services. The 1960s saw the beginning of reconstruction. Visitors could make appointments with the church custodian to climb 60 meters to the top of the tower. In 1966, construction work on 5 tower landings came to an abrupt end, when in August the leaders of the Potsdam Communist Party decided to have the ruins removed without consulting the general public.

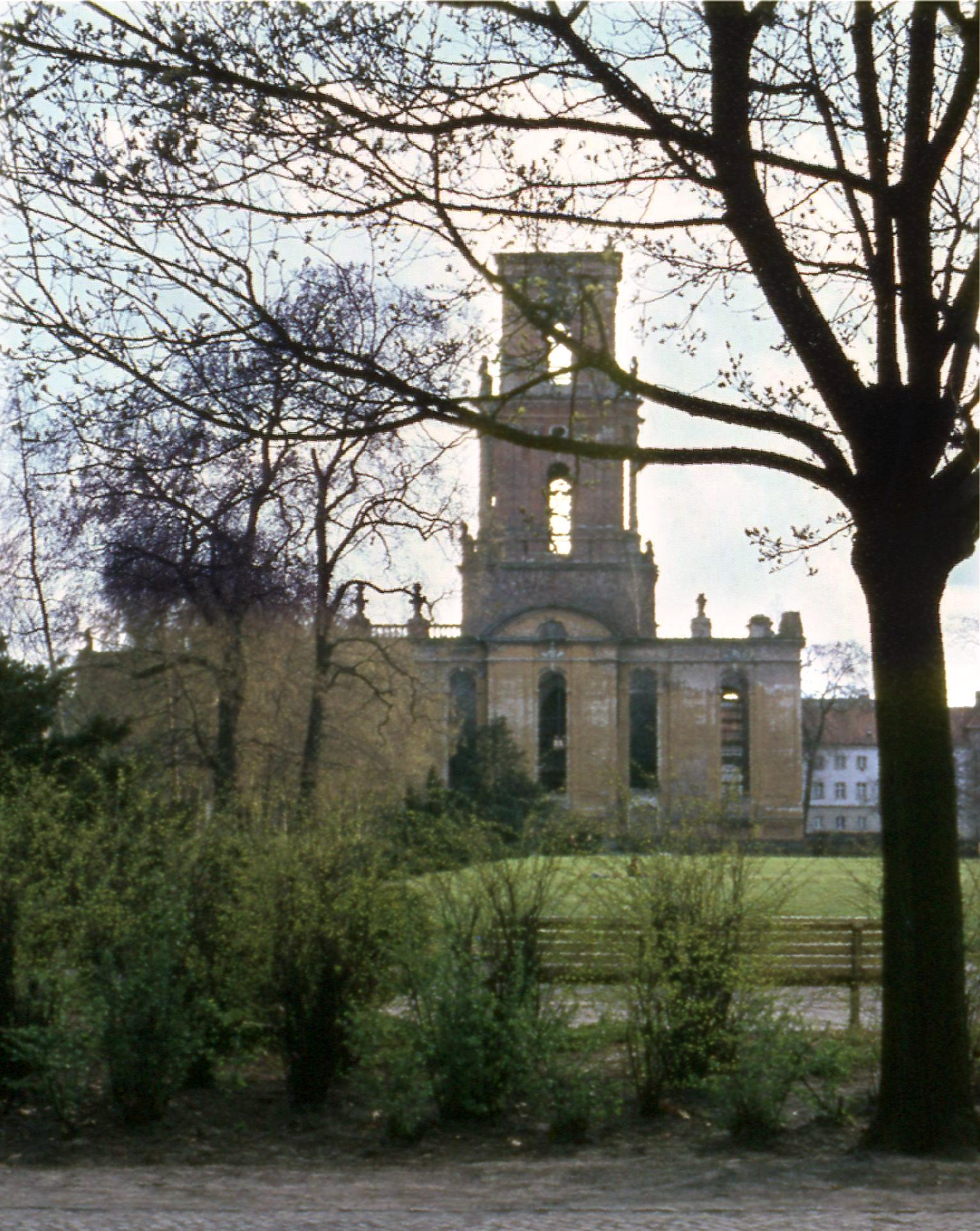
Ruin in 1966 shortly before demolition

A year later, Walter Ulbricht, President of the East German state and a staunch opponent to the church and all that had to do with the Prussian monarchy, visited Potsdam and, during a three-hour debate over the future of building policy, asked, "What right does this ruin have to exist in Potsdam?" Further, he declared that all ruins in Potsdam left from the war should disappear, for the establishment of a new church could only interfere with the creation of a socialist city image. Strong opposition from Church Authorities, those who wished to protect city monuments, architects and citizens both within and without East Germany were unable to prevent the decision by the city authorities on 26 April 1968, to destroy what was left of the Garrison Church.

Curiously, the decision was not unanimous as was the norm in the GDR. Four delegates voted against it. On 14 May 1968, several blasts demolished the church ruins. On 19 June, after an unsuccessful attempt to destroy it, half of the tower ruin remained standing. The rest finally was finally destroyed on Sunday, 23 June. Once the rubble was removed, construction began for the nearby Potsdam Computing Centre in 1971.

=== Reconstruction ===
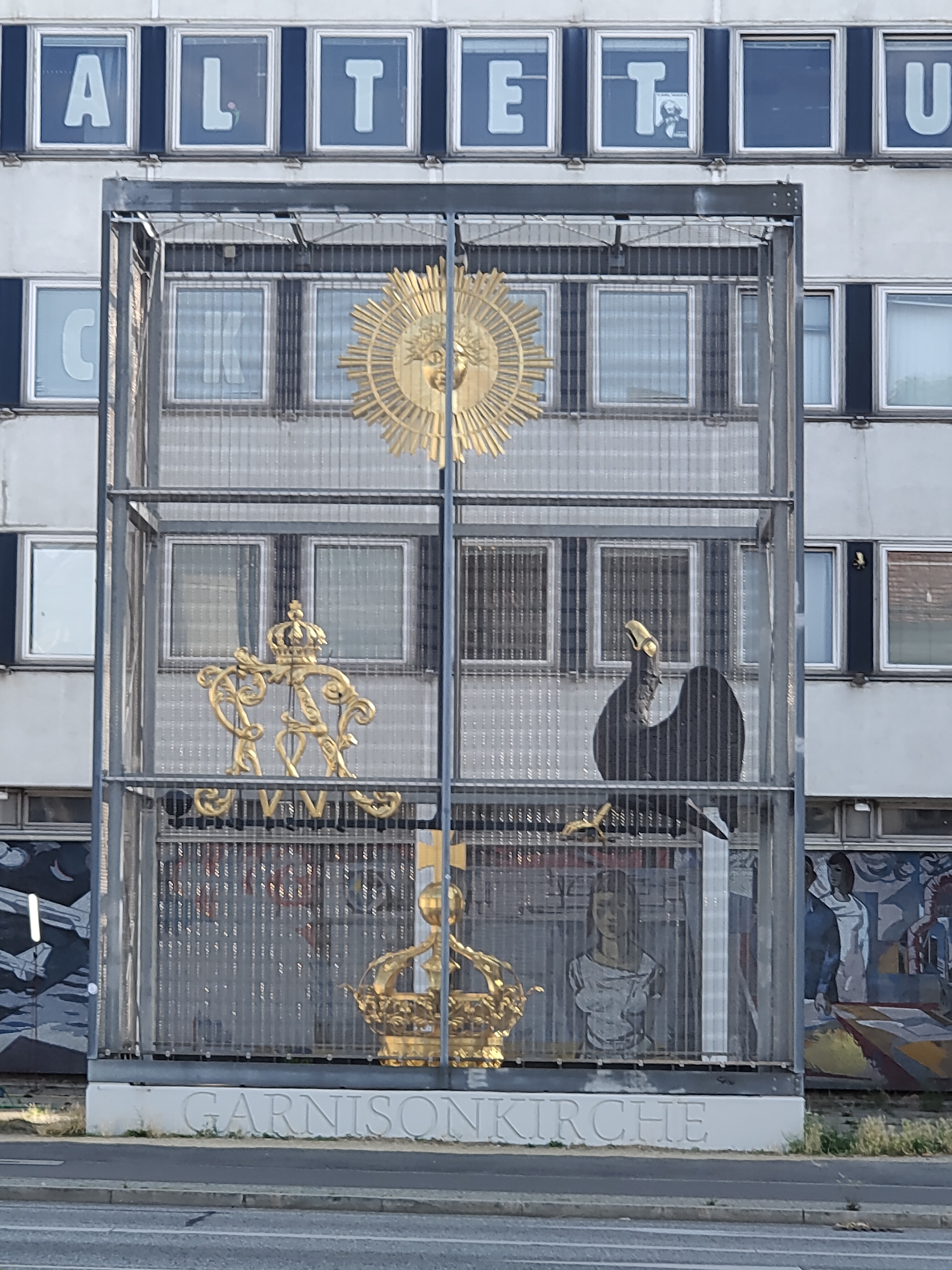
Replica of the weather vane of the Potsdam Garrison Church

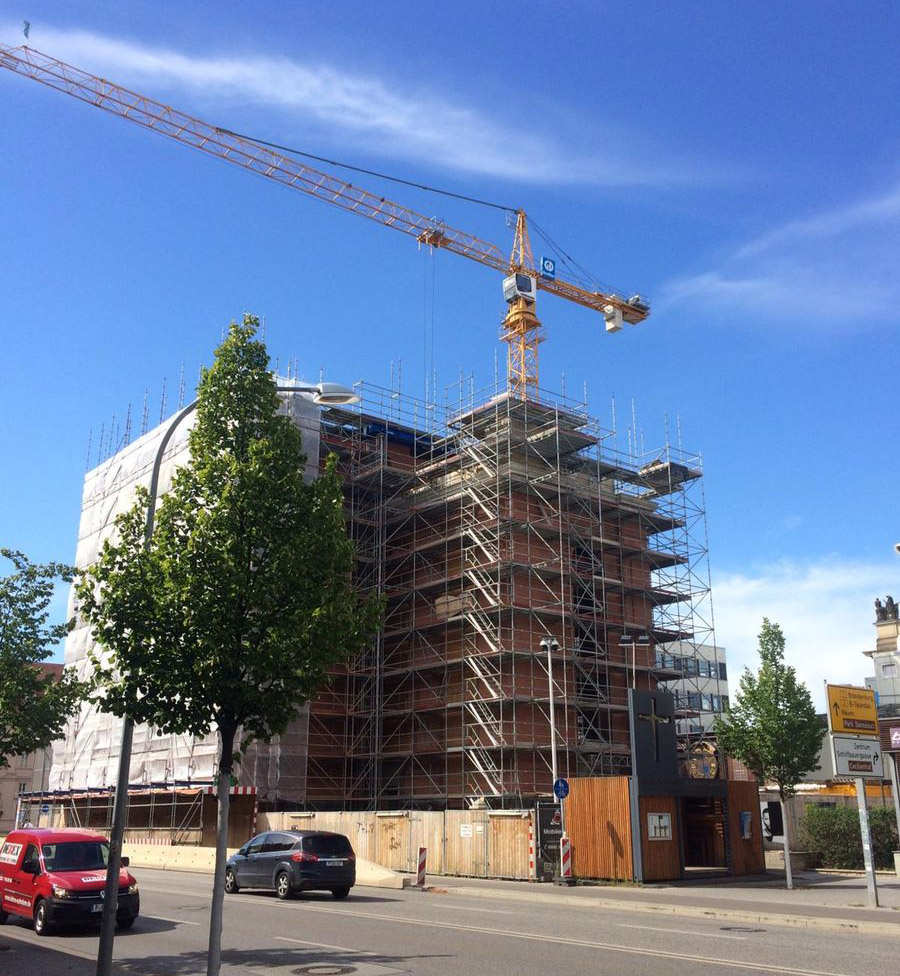
The bell tower under reconstruction in 2020

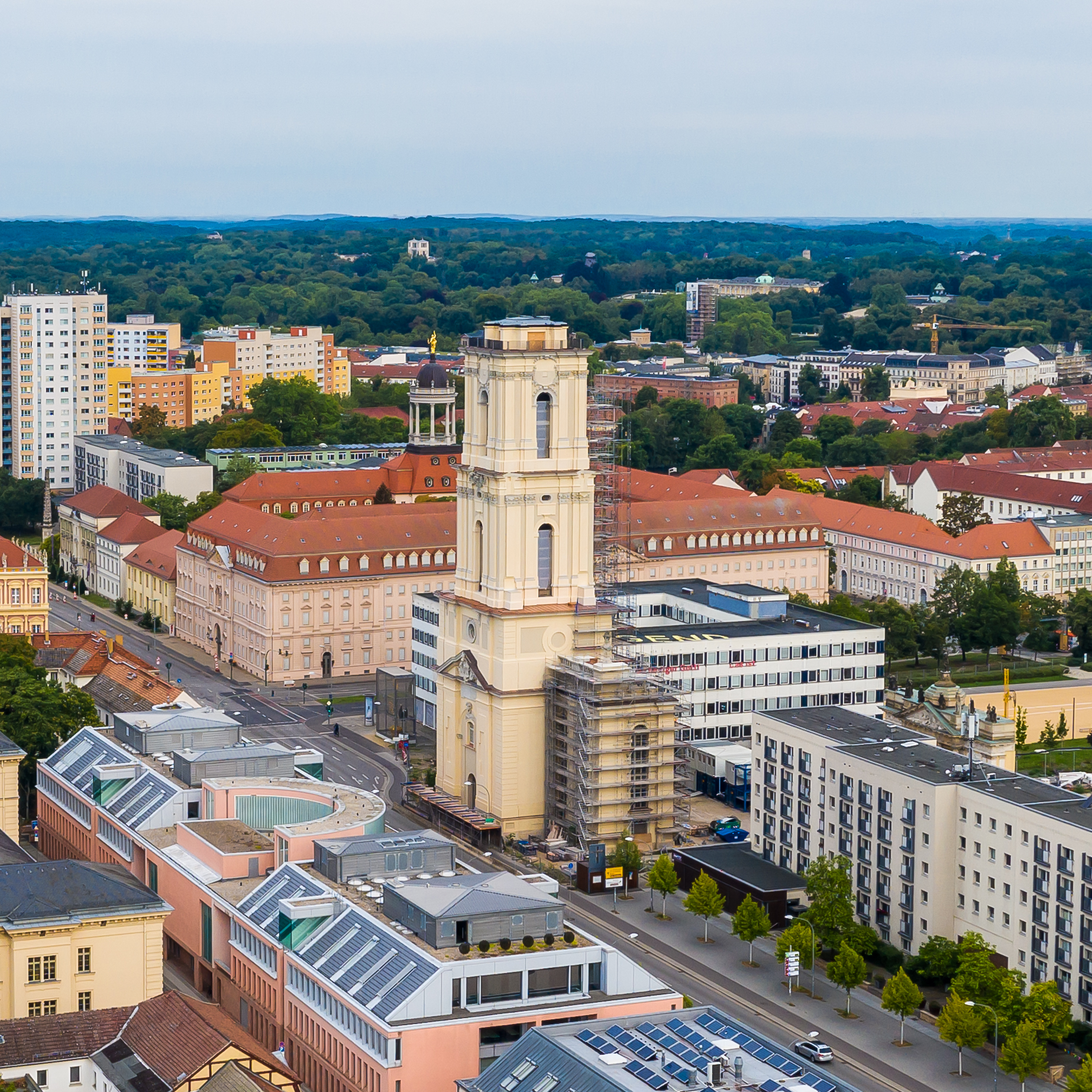
Garrison Church (still under construction) in August 2023

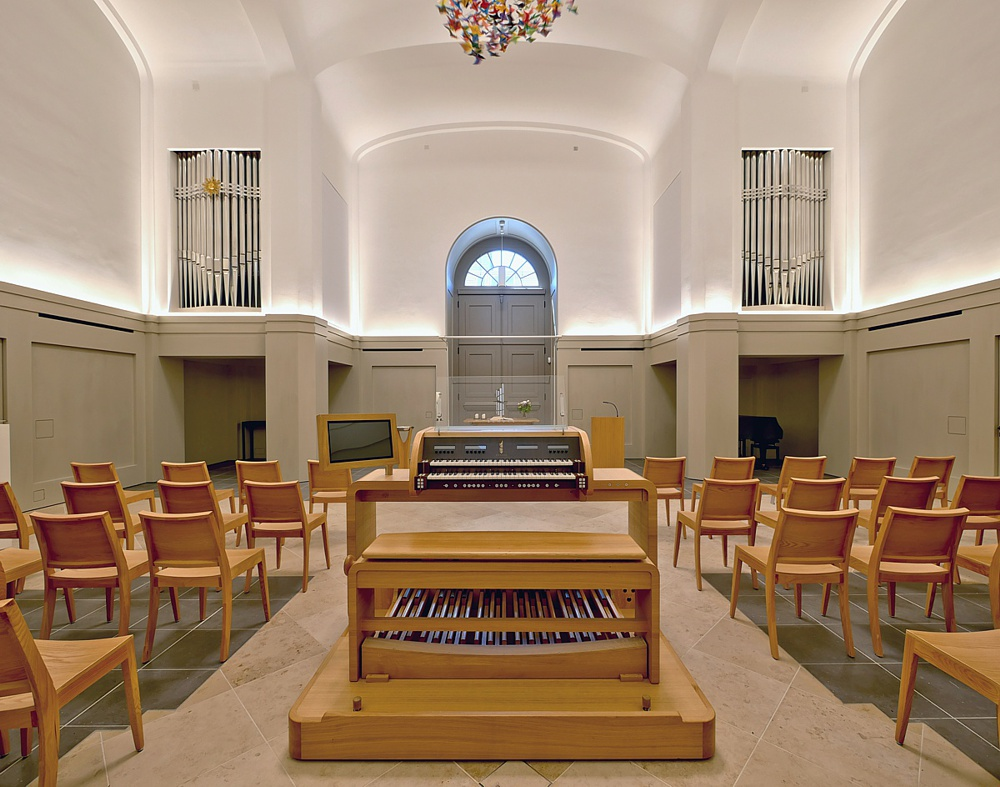
The Coventry Cross of Nails chapel in the Garrison Church Tower with organ (2024)

In 1984, the Society for the Continuation of the Potsdam Carillon Tradition (acronym SCPC) was founded in Iserlohn. In 1987 work began to cast new bells for the carillon which were turned over to the city of Potsdam on 14 April 1991, shortly after German reunification. At the request of the Mayor of Potsdam, donations given to the Society were designated for the reconstruction of the Garrison Church. In 2001 the President of the SCPC initiated the founding of the "Stiftung Preußisches Kulturerbe" (Prussian Cultural Heritage Foundation), which, once reconstruction was completed, would be responsible for future maintenance. He did not succeed, however, in reaching agreement with the Protestant Church (Evangelische Kirche) and the City of Potsdam over the subsequent use of the church and decided instead to dissolve the SCPC and pass its donations (over 6 million Euros) on to the Prussian Cultural Heritage Foundation. The members of the dissolved society then became a "Circle of Friends" without right of say but willing to cooperate with the Prussian Cultural Heritage Foundation.

On 15 January 2004, over 100 individuals from Brandenburg and Berlin signed up for "Call from Potsdam", a petition calling for the complete reconstruction of the Hof und Garnisonkirche Potsdam. Patrons for the initiative at the time were Bishop Dr. Wolfgang Huber, Prime Minister of Brandenburg Matthias Platzeck and Minister of Interior Brandenburg Jörg Schönbohm.

Since 2004, the Garnisonkirche belongs to the International Community of the Cross of Nails (founded in Dresden in February 1991). In February 2004 on the initiative of the Industry Club of Potsdam, citizens from both Potsdam and Berlin founded the Society for the Reconstruction of the Garrison Church Potsdam (German acronym FWG) following the concept proposed by the Protestant Church of Germany. The FWG is an agreement between persons and organizations with interests stemming from religious, philosophical, cultural or city planning backgrounds who wish to recommend and commit their support to the present and future work involved in the reconstruction of the Garrison Church according to the theme stated in Call from Potsdam.

At the end of a church service celebrated on 23 June 2008, Bishop Dr. Wolfgang Huber announced the creation of the Garrison Church Potsdam Foundation in the presence of many prominent personalities. The date was chosen on purpose: it was the 40th anniversary of the day the East German Communist government, without authorization and despite massive protest in and outside the country, blew up the remnants of the Garrison Church; remnants which could have been reconstructed. The purpose and aim of the new foundation is to rebuild the Garrison Church as a lesson of conscience. On 25 June 2011, a temporary chapel was opened to the public. It contains an exhibition marking the past and future history of the Garrison Church and stands just behind the spot where future church will one day be built.

The leaders of the Protestant Church of Germany decided in 2010 that the chapel should be an official parish church with its own pastor as of 2011. In 2013 the German National Committee for Cultural and Media Affairs named the Garrison church Potsdam an important cultural monument and offered 12 million Euro towards the funding of its reconstruction. Reconstruction work began in 2017 with the aim to complete the tower first.

Since July 2013, the Garrison Church Foundation has official permission for the reconstruction of the church tower. By clearing the area and re-routing the course of Broad Street to accommodate as nearly as possible the original building site; two important premises for the start of construction have already been met. A ceremony for the beginning of construction on the tower of the reconstructed Garrison Church was due to be celebrated on 31 October 2017 (the 500th anniversary of the Reformation).

On 27 October 2017, it was reported that €12m would be contributed from federal funds in order to construct the church's tower. In July 2023, reports stated that construction is due to be completed the following year, with the nave and the rest may follow.

On Easter Monday 2024, the new Coventry Cross of Nails chapel in the rebuilt tower was opened with a church service.

On 22 August 2024, the rebuilt tower with an exhibition about the history of the place and a viewing platform at a height of 57 meters was inaugurated in a ceremony attended by German President Frank-Walter Steinmeier. At the same time, more than 100 people demonstrated opposite the tower in protest against the reconstruction. Construction of the tower's cupola began in March 2025 and is scheduled for completion by 2027.

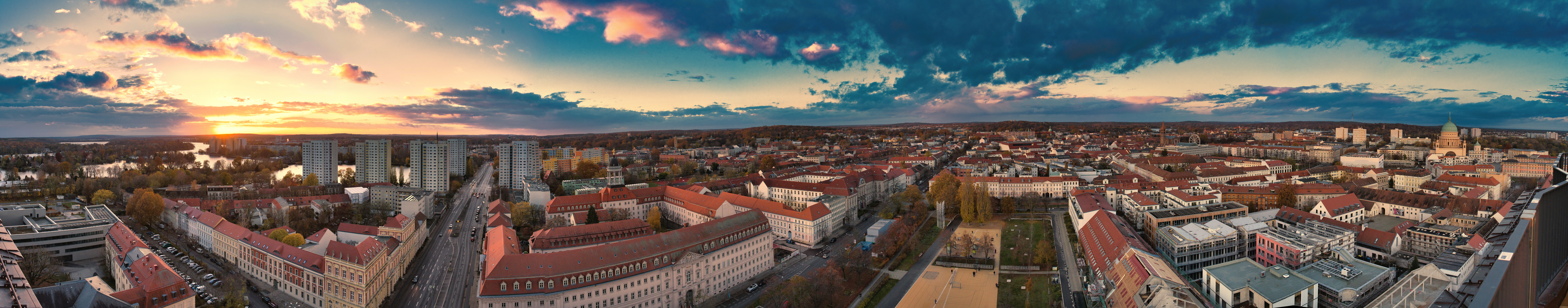
Panorama to the northwest from the viewing platform of the Garrison Church Tower

== Sources ==
- Reinhard Appel, Andreas Kitschke: Der Wiederaufbau der Potsdamer Garnisonkirche. Lingen Verlag, Köln 2006, ISBN 3-937490-70-1.
- Ludwig Bamberg: Die Potsdamer Garnisonkirche. Baugeschichte – Ausstattung – Bedeutung. Lukas Verlag, Berlin 2006, ISBN 3-936872-86-4.
- Winfred Ellerhorst: Das Glockenspiel Deutschland 1939 (small booklet)
- Andreas Kitschke: Die Garnisonkirche Potsdam. Krone der Stadt und Schauplatz der Geschichte. Bebra, Berlin 2016, ISBN 978-3-86124-694-7.
- Laura J. Meilink-Hoedemaker Article about The Amsterdam bell-foundry under Jan Albert de Grave 1699–1729, in 'Klok en Klepel' the Dutch bulletin of the 'Nederlandse Klokkenspel Vereniging.' nr 115 Dec 2011
- Luc Rombouts: Zingend Brons, uitgeverij Davidsfonds Leuven, 2010, ISBN 978-90-5826-720-7 (in Dutch; the English version will come soon)
- Anke Silomon: Pflugscharen zu Schwertern. Schwerter zu Pflugscharen. Die Potsdamer Garnisonkirche im 20. Jahrhundert. Nicolai, Berlin 2014, ISBN 978-3-89479-858-1.
