= Bombing of Potsdam =

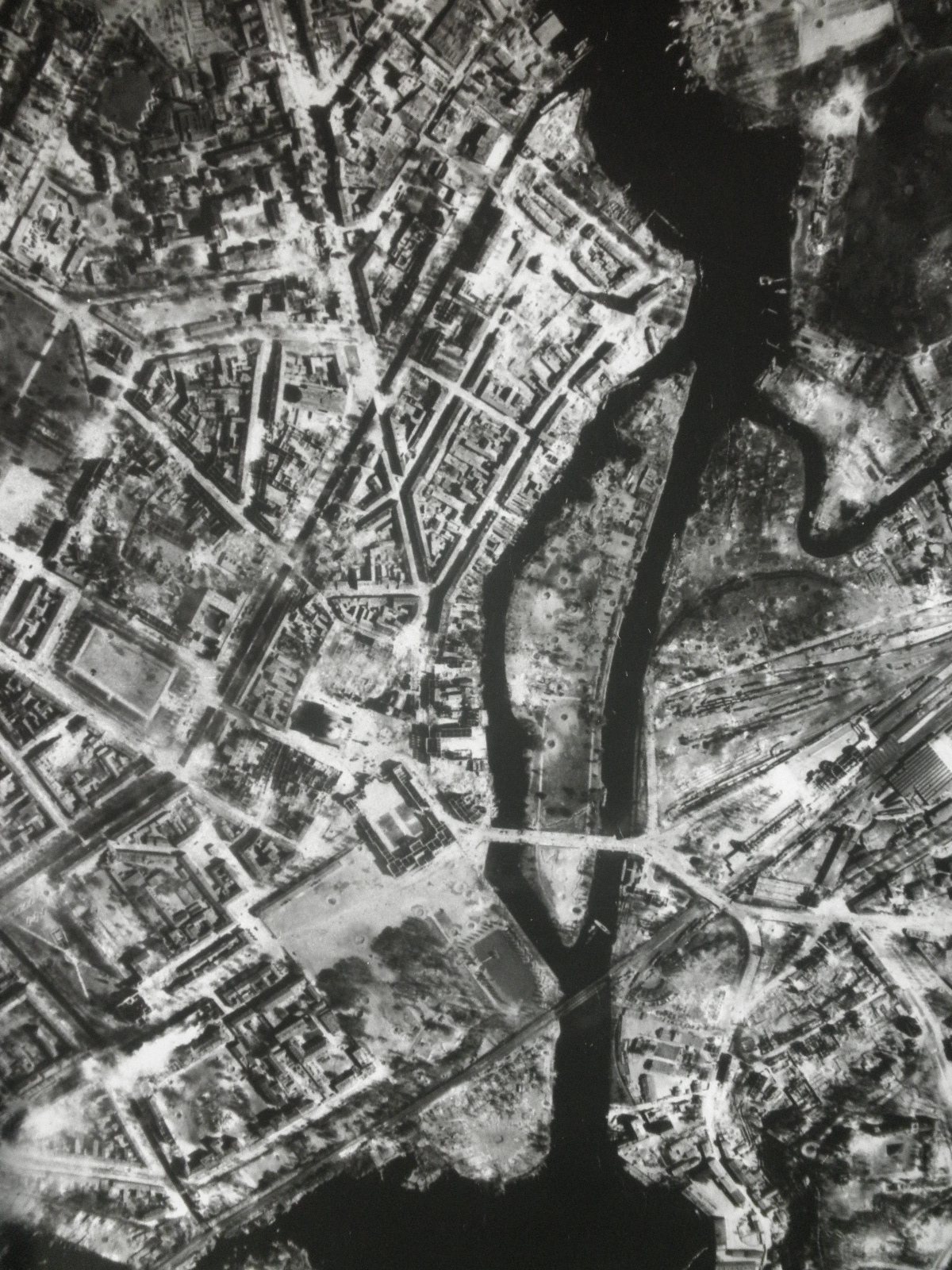
Aerial view of the raid on Potsdam from an exhibition in the Pavillon on the Alte Markt in July 2016.

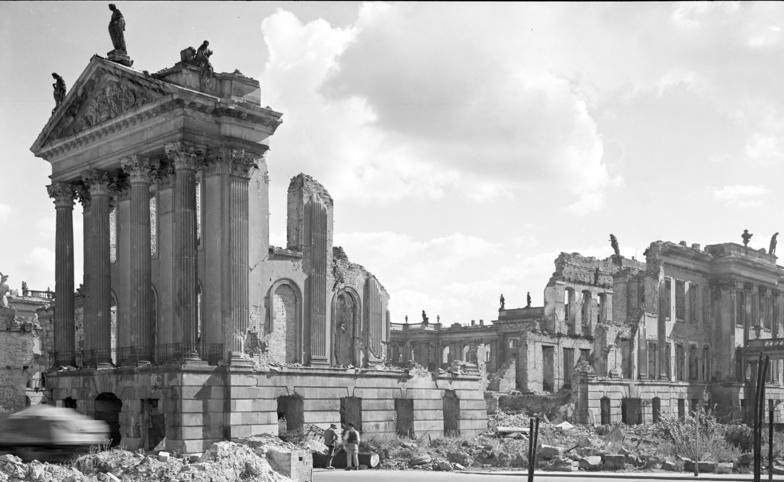
The destroyed Potsdamer Stadtschloss.

The Bombing of Potsdam or Night of Potsdam took place on 14-15 April 1945, beginning at 22:16 on the night of the 14th. Very soon after the air raid sirens sounded, 490 heavy four-engine RAF Avro Lancaster bombers dropped approximately 1,700 tons of bombs (high-explosive bombs, mine bombs, and incendiary bombs). 1,593 Potsdam residents died during the bombing or in the flames afterward, large parts of the city centre were destroyed, almost 1,000 buildings in the city center were completely destroyed, and around 60,000 people were left homeless.

== Events ==
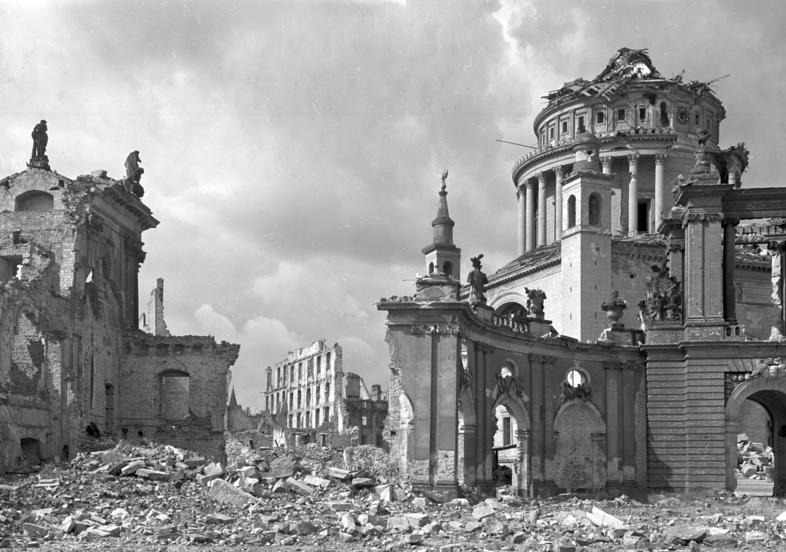
The Nikolaikirche.

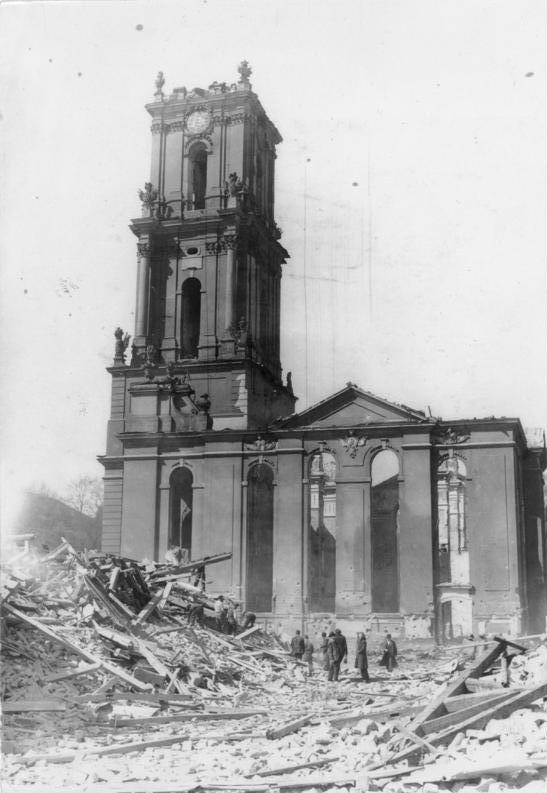
The burning Garrison Church after the raid.

According to Allied sources at the time the main target of the raid was Potsdam Hauptbahnhof, but that train station had no military significance. The amount of bombs carried, the high number of incendiary bombs used, the fact that the Old Town was marked with four flares as a target area (according to research from 2014/15, these were not so-called 'Christmas trees') and the railway station's location on the edge of the Old Town all suggest that the attack was not aimed at destroying targets of military significance but the deliberate destruction of the Old Town. This is confirmed by RAF documents released to the public in 1990 by the National Archives showing that the raid's main target was the Old Town.

Most of the southern and eastern parts of the Old Town and the area northeast of Brauhausberg were also hit and suffered severe damage. Potsdam City Palace, the Garrison Church, and other important buildings in the city burned down. Large parts of the northern suburbs of Potsdam, including the Berlin suburb, went up in flames, and parts of Babelsberg were also hit. The Reich Archives on Brauhausberg burned down. Up to 97% of the buildings in Potsdam's city center and the Berlin suburb were destroyed or damaged. Babelsberg got off relatively lightly with only 23% of that area destroyed or damaged.

The Nikolaikirche, Altes Rathaus in the Alte Markt (rebuilt after the war), the Heilig-Geist-Kirche (demolished after 1945), the Royal Playhouse on the east side of the Old Town, the Monopteros at the Great Military Orphanage on Breiten Straße and a few other significant buildings survived, albeit badly damaged. The ground fighting continued around Potsdam despite the raid. When the city was declared a "Festung", i.e. a 'fortress', observer posts occupied the highest vantage points. These were particularly hard hit by the Soviet artillery bombardment that lasted for days around April 24; many other buildings that had survived until then went up in flames and were thus also lost, with only the parks and their palaces spared major destruction.

== Remembrance ==
=== Graves and memorials in the Neuer Friedhof ===
The city's Neuer Friedhof has a large memorial, the 'Bombenopferehrenfelder' I and II, along with individual and mass graves, totalling 1641 victims, mostly from the raid on 14-15 April. No. I contains 341 individual graves from the Second World War, with granite crosses placed in 1993, whilst No. II contains 1,370 people from the same conflict. They both mainly consist of victims on the 14-15 April raid, but also soldiers, civilians and foreigners killed in the last days of the war in and around Potsdam. A 1979 inscription in German translates as "In memory of victims of the bombing of Potsdam on 14 April 1945".

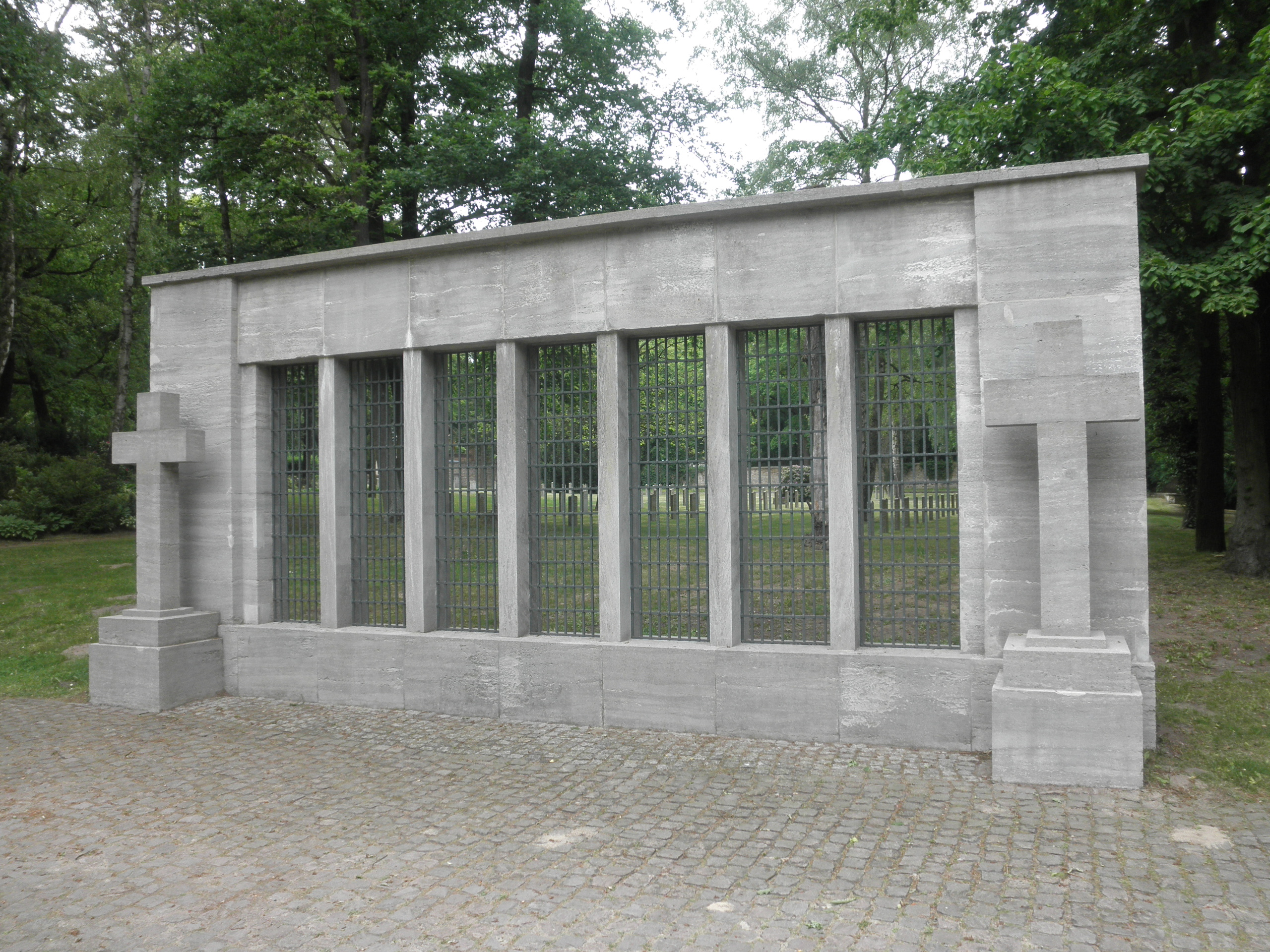
Memorial wall in the Neuer Friedhof

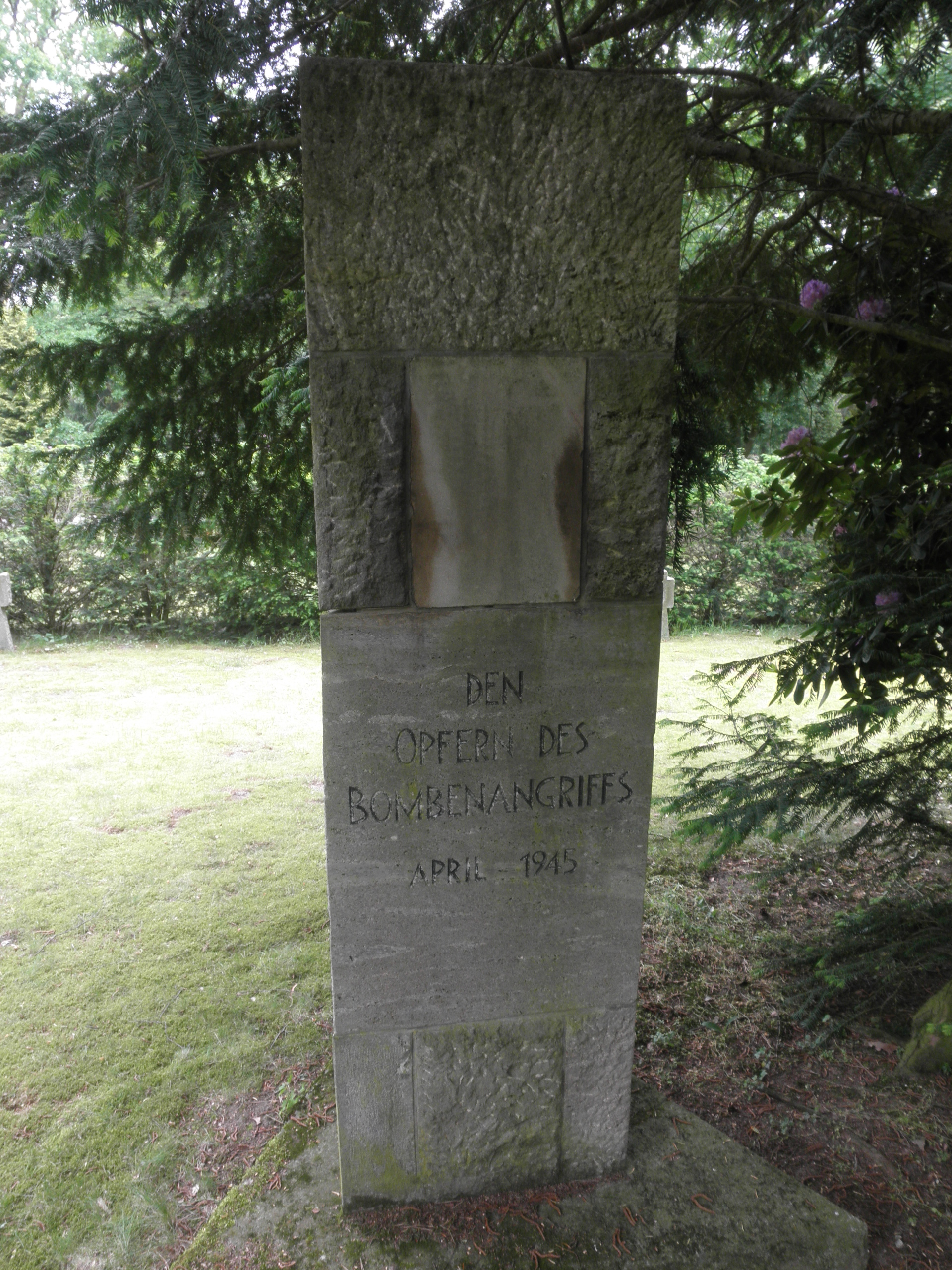
Memorial to the bombing victims at the mass graves in the Neuer Friedhof

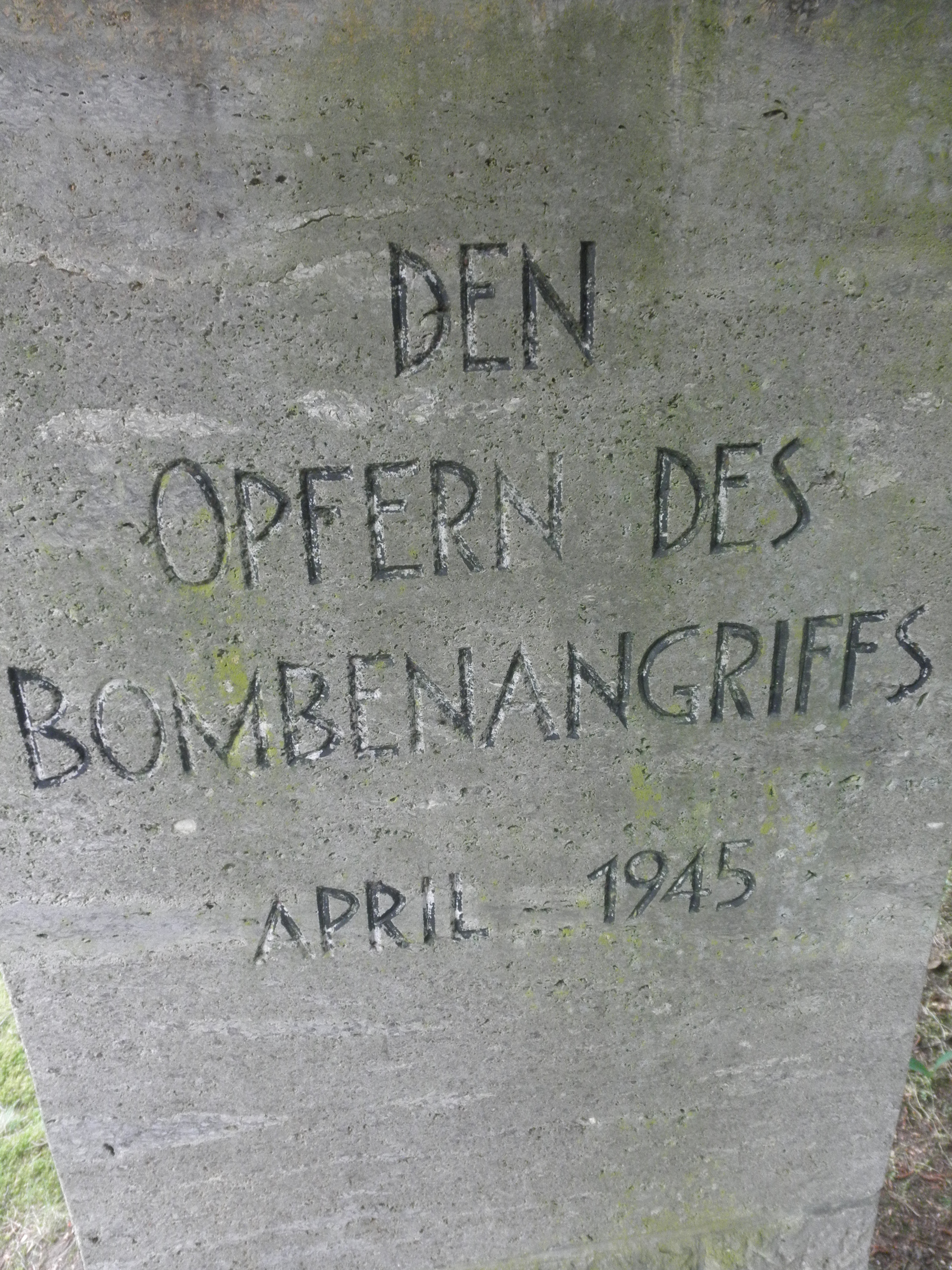
Stela with the inscription

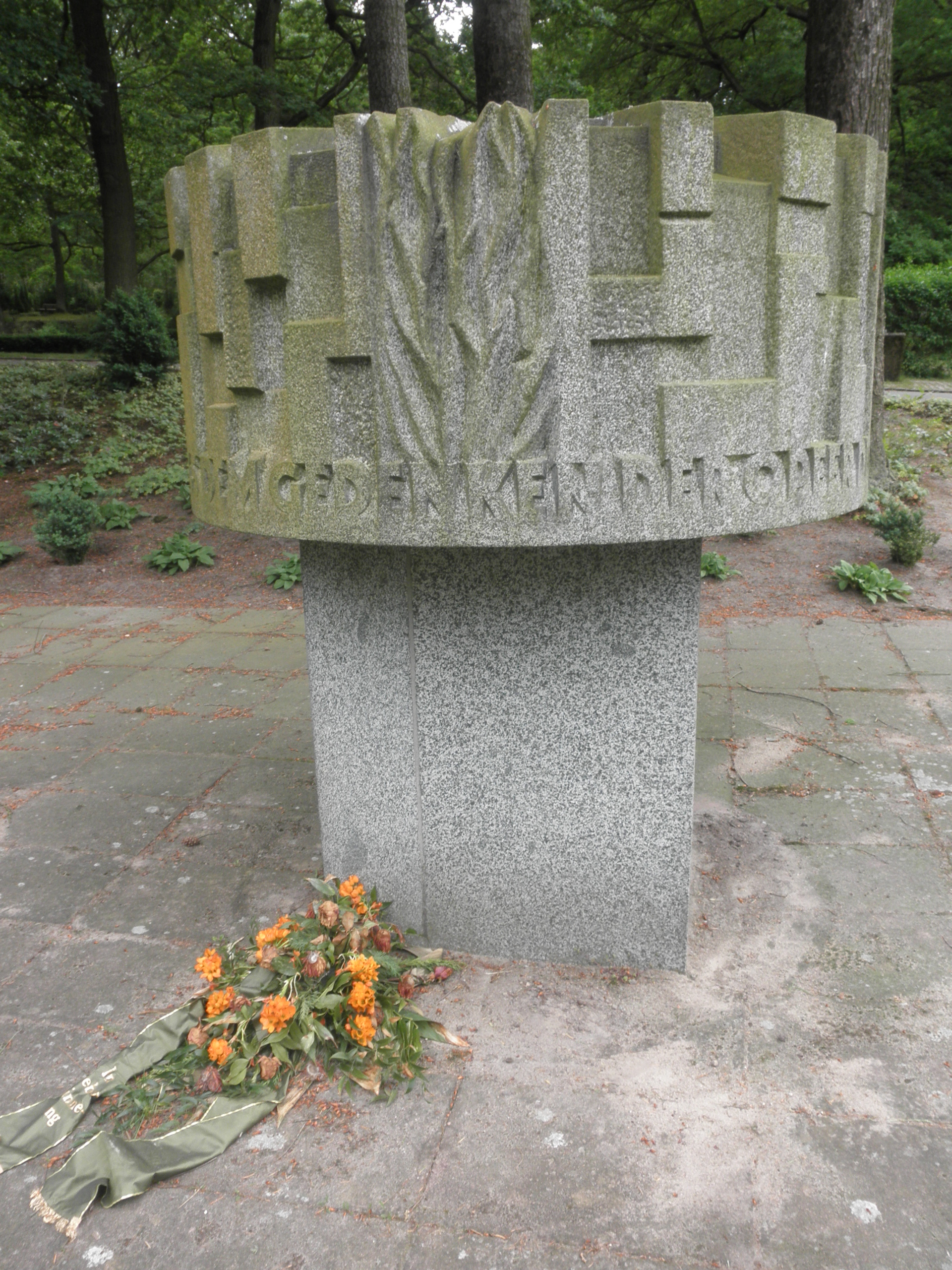
1979 memorial to the bombing victims in the Neuer Friedhof

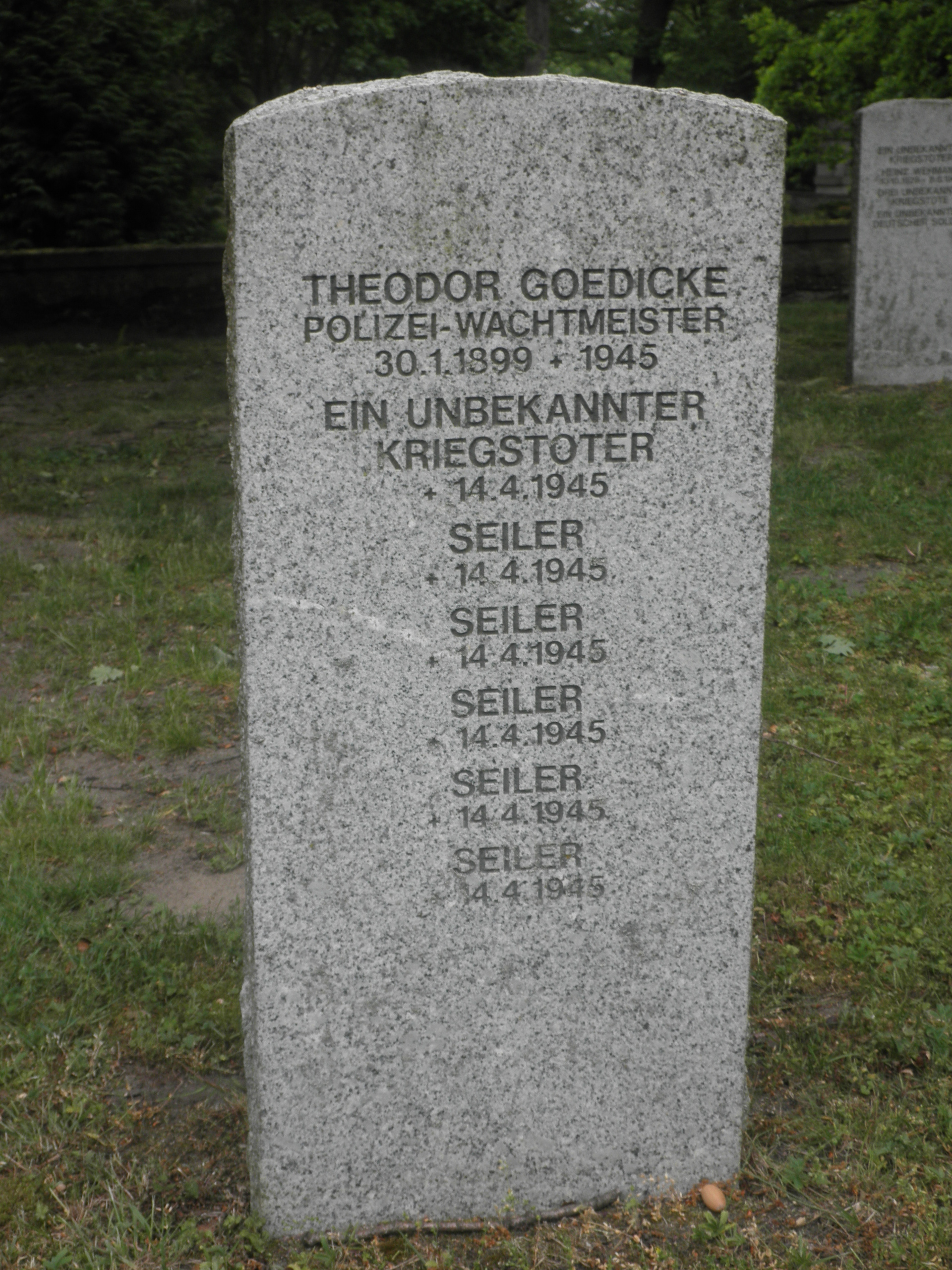
Five bombing victims from the same family buried together

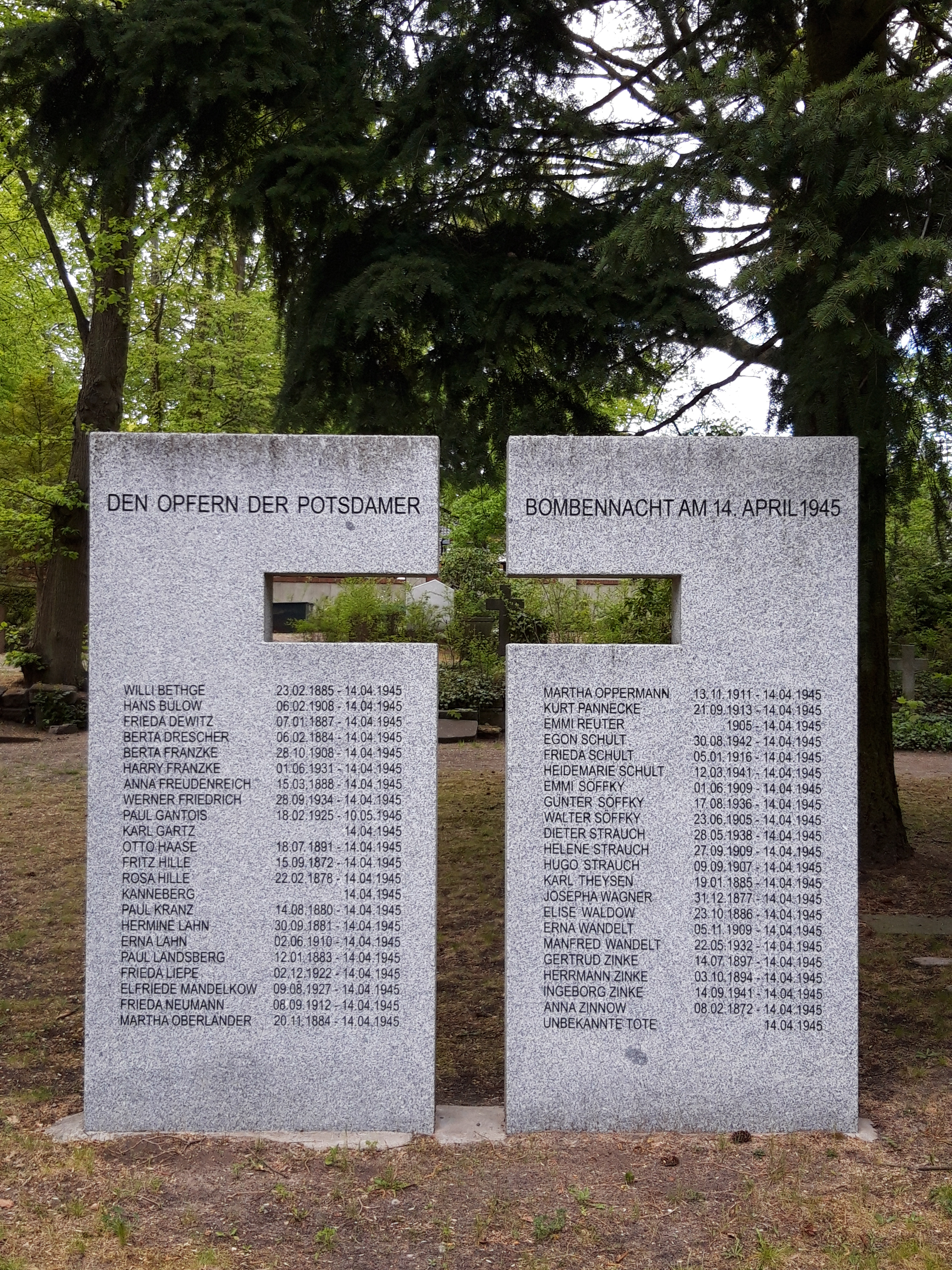
Memorial to the bombing victims at the Goethestraße cemetery in Potsdam-Babelsberg

There is also a memorial wall at the Goethestraße Cemetery in Babelsberg to forty-four inhabitants of that area killed in the bombing raid.

== Bibliography (in German) ==
- Dieter Schulte, Hartmut Knitter: Potsdam im Bild der Geschichte. Teil 1: Von den Anfängen bis zum Jahre 1945. Hrsg.: Direktion des Bezirksmuseums Potsdam 1979.
- Hans-Werner Mihan: Die Nacht von Potsdam: der Luftangriff britischer Bomber vom 14. April 1945. Dokumentation und Erlebnisberichte. Vowinckel, Berg am Starnberger See 1997, 200 S., ISBN 3-921655-83-8.

== External links (in German) ==
- Günter Schenke: Bombennacht: Gedenken und Fragen, Potsdamer Neueste Nachrichten vom 14. April 2008
- Das Protokoll der Bombennacht in Potsdam, Märkische Allgemeine vom 14. April 2015
- Gedenkandacht des Potsdamer Oberbürgermeisters Jann Jakobs, Pressemitteilung (2010)
- Nacht von Potsdam – Artikel beim PotsdamWiki
