= Hugo von Tschudi =

German art historian and museum curator (1851–1911)

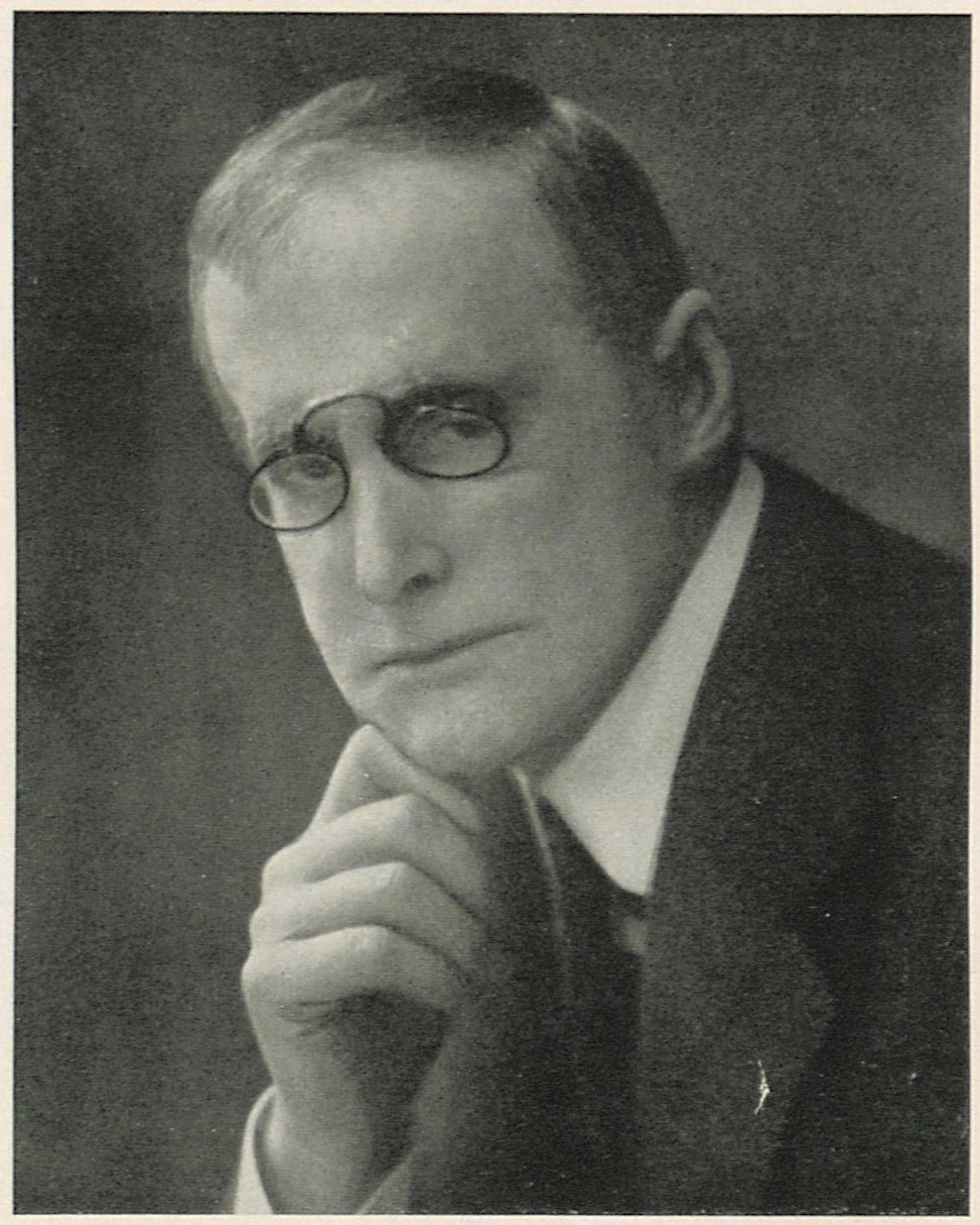
- Hugo von Tschudi in 1895

Director of the Bavarian State Painting Collections
- In office 1 January 1909 – 23 November 1911 (his death)

Director of the National Gallery (Berlin)
- In office 1 January 1896 – 31 December 1908

Personal details
- Born: Hugo Egidius von Tschudi; 7 February 1851 Edlitz, Austria
- Died: 23 November 1911 (aged 60) Stuttgart, Kingdom of Württemberg, German Empire
- Spouse: Angela Fausta Gonzales Olivares (m. 1900)
- Occupation: Jurist, art historian, curator, art patron

Hugo Egidius von Tschudi (7 February 1851 – 23 November 1911) was an Austrian-born Swiss art historian, patron and museum curator. He most notably served as Director of the National Gallery (Berlin) from 1896 to 1908, as well as of the Bavarian State Painting Collections from 1909 to 1911 (his death).

During his tenure in Berlin, von Tschudi was a patron of contemporary art and acquired several works of French Impressionists and modernized the museum collections creating a foundation and place in art history for them. He also worked for the Swiss art collector Oskar Reinhart.

== Early life and education ==
Von Tschudi was born 7 February 1851, on the Jakobshof Estate near Edlitz, Lower Austria, to Johann Jakob von Tschudi (1818–1889) and Ottilie von Tschudi (née Schnorr von Carolsfeld).

His paternal family was originally from Glarus, Switzerland and some branches, including his, claimed to have been nobilitated by Emperor Ferdinand I in 1559. Ever since they used the prefix von. He was a Swiss abroad with his place of origin being Ennenda and Glarus. His maternal grandfather was Ludwig Ferdinand Schnorr von Carolsfeld, originally from Schneeberg, Saxony in Prussia.

From 1860, von Tschudi lived in St. Gallen, Switzerland, where he stayed with his uncle before going to Vienna to study. He completed the Gymnasium before studying law at the University of Vienna completing his Juris Doctor in 1875. He concurrently attended lectures in art history. After completing his studies, he traveled extensively for two years, to Germany, the Netherlands, Belgium, England, France and Italy.

== Career ==
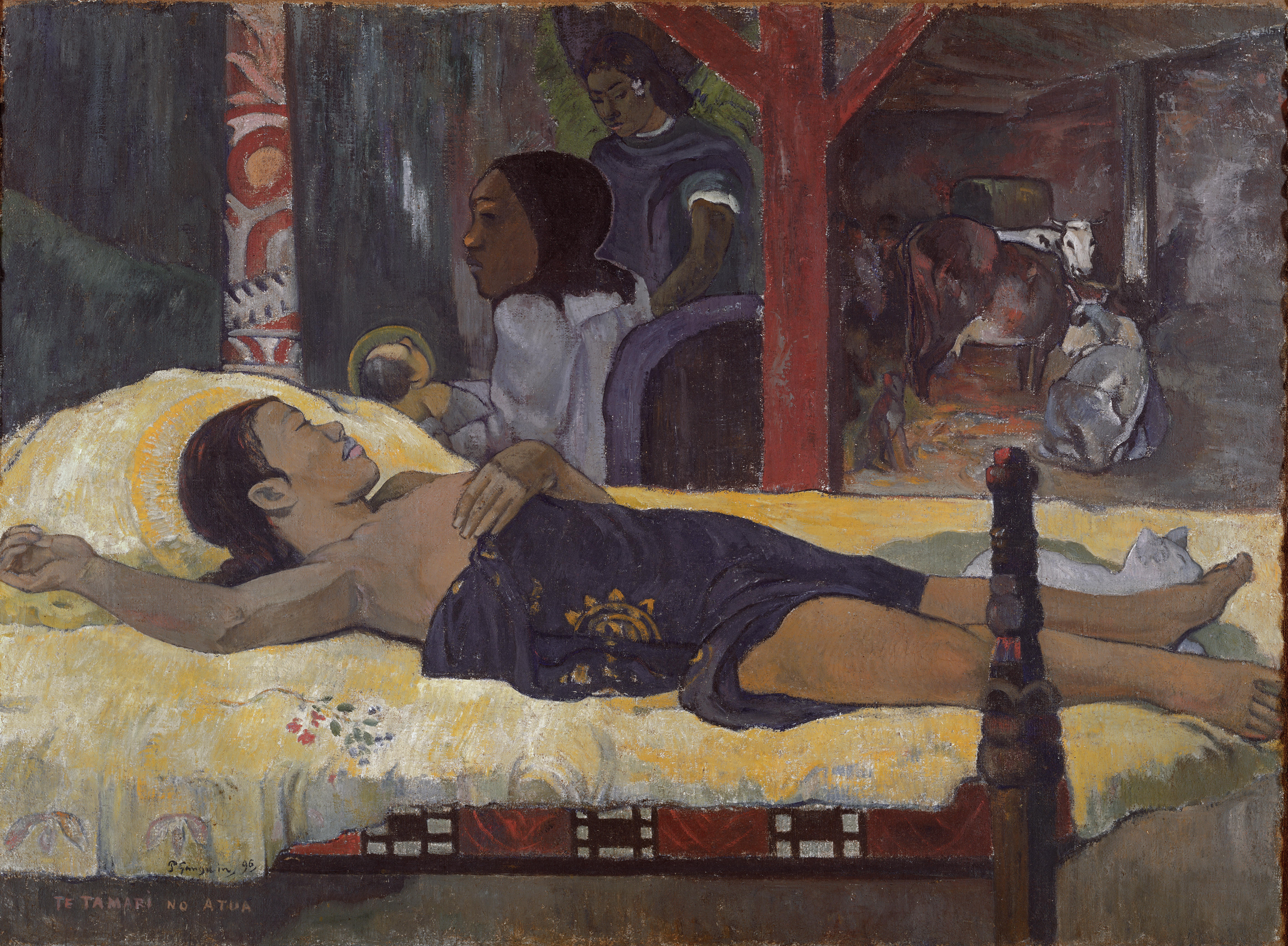
Gauguin's The Birth of Christ (1896), which cost Tschudi his position in Berlin

Tschudi arrived as director of the Nationalgalerie in 1896. He immediately set about the acquisition of modern French painting, securing In the Conservatory (Au jardin d’hiver) by Édouard Manet from 1879, and the first Paul Cézanne to enter any public collection anywhere followed the next year in July 1897. Other works by Renoir, Monet, Pissarro and Degas joined them. However, Gauguin's controversial masterpiece The Birth of Christ, from 1896, would prove Tschudi's undoing. The contemporary work, mixing the sacred with the profane and the primitive, was not generally appreciated by most Europeans at the time. In particular, it was intensely disapproved of by Kaiser Wilhelm. In 1909, Tschudi loaned the painting to the institution but was promptly dismissed from his position by the Kaiser. Tschudi was given a new job as director of the Neue Pinakothek in Munich, in the Kingdom of Bavaria, which he continued to manage until his death in 1911. He took the new Gauguin painting with him to Munich, where it remains in the permanent art collection there.

Between 1909 and 1914, the Tschudi Contributions brought a collection of Impressionism and Post-Impressionism paintings to the Bavarian State Collections in Munich. Tschudi, serving as the general director of the collections, acquired 44 paintings, nine sculptures and 22 drawings, mostly from emerging French artists. In Bavaria public funds could not be used to buy such works, but Tschudi's associates were able to find the money to complete the purchases with private contributions after his death in 1911.

== Personal life ==
On 1 October 1900, aged 49, he married Spanish-born Angela Fausta Gonzales Olivares (1873–1952), originally from Madrid, in Paris, France. They had one son;

- Hans Gilg von Tschudi (1901–1931), a merchant, married Elsa Alice Maeder (1903–1970), without issue.

Von Tschudi died on 23 November 1911 in Stuttgart aged 60.

== Books ==
- Ausstellungskatalog Berlin, München: Manet bis van Gogh, Hugo von Tschudi und der Kampf um die Moderne. Prestel-Verlag 1996 ISBN 3-7913-1748-2
- Barbara Paul: Hugo von Tschudi und die moderne französische Kunst im Deutschen Kaiserreich. Zabern-Verlag 2001 ISBN 3-8053-1416-7
