= Otto Gerstenberg =

German art collector and entrepreneur

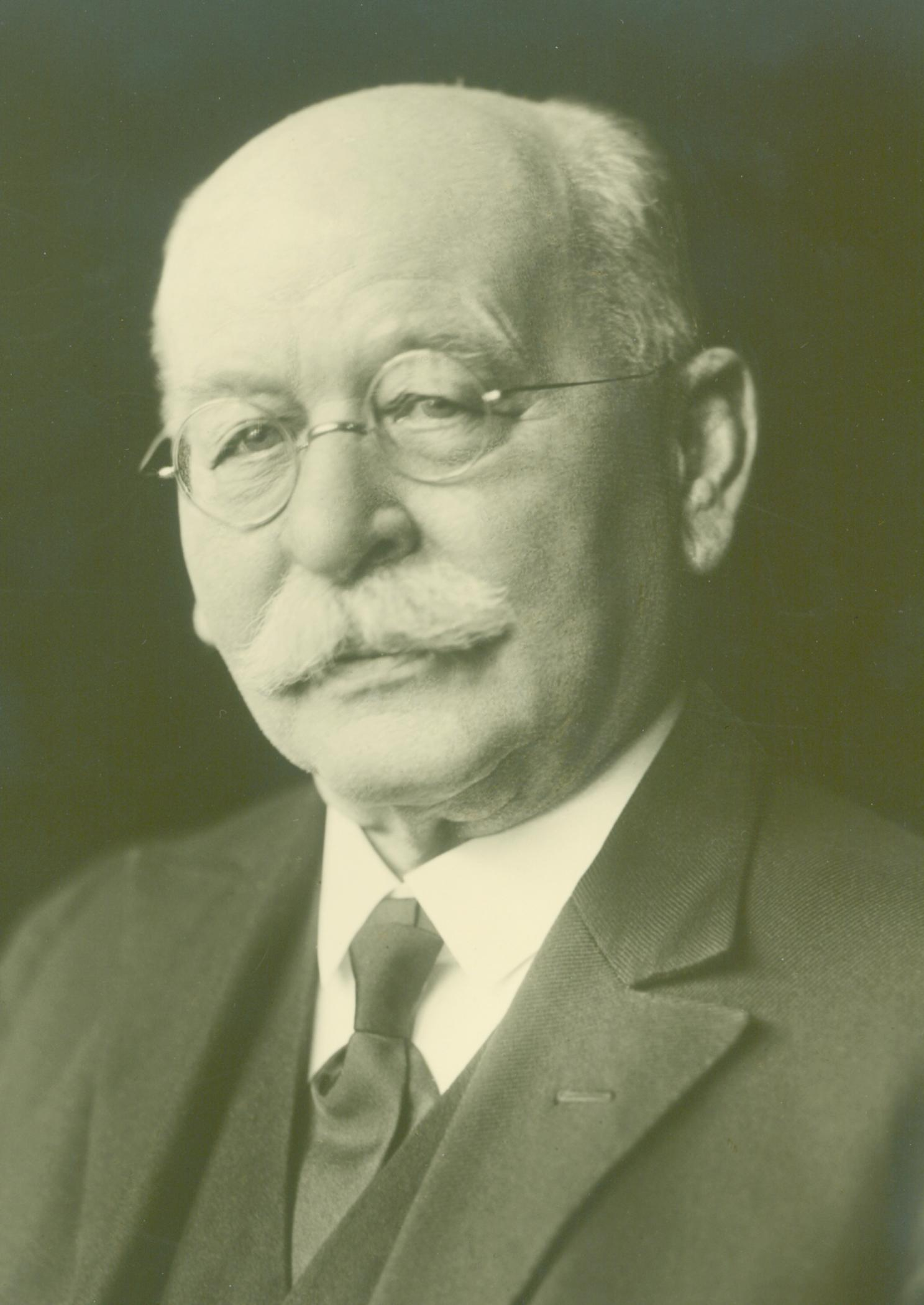
Otto Gerstenberg, 1923

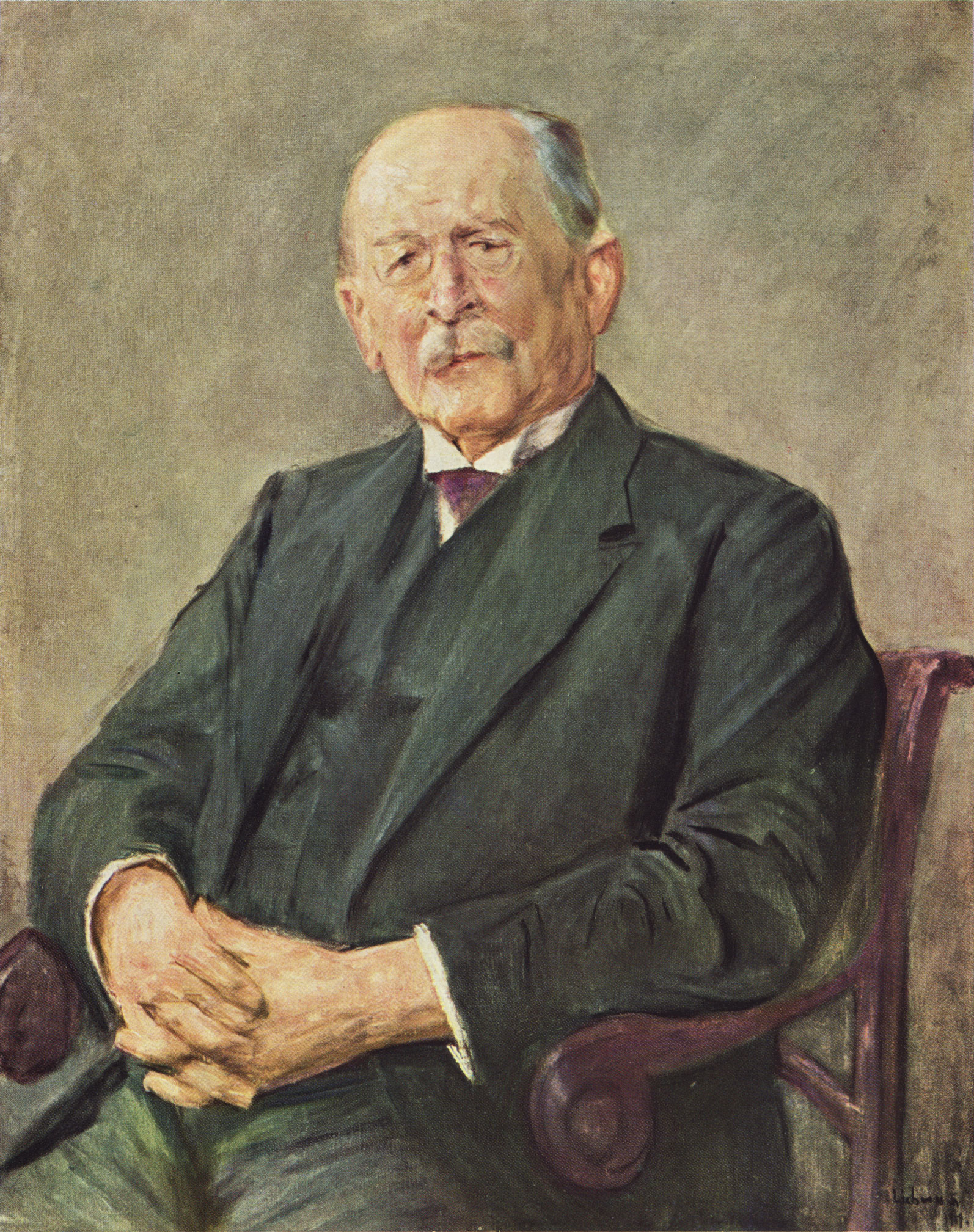
Otto Gerstenberg, painting by Max Liebermann, 1919

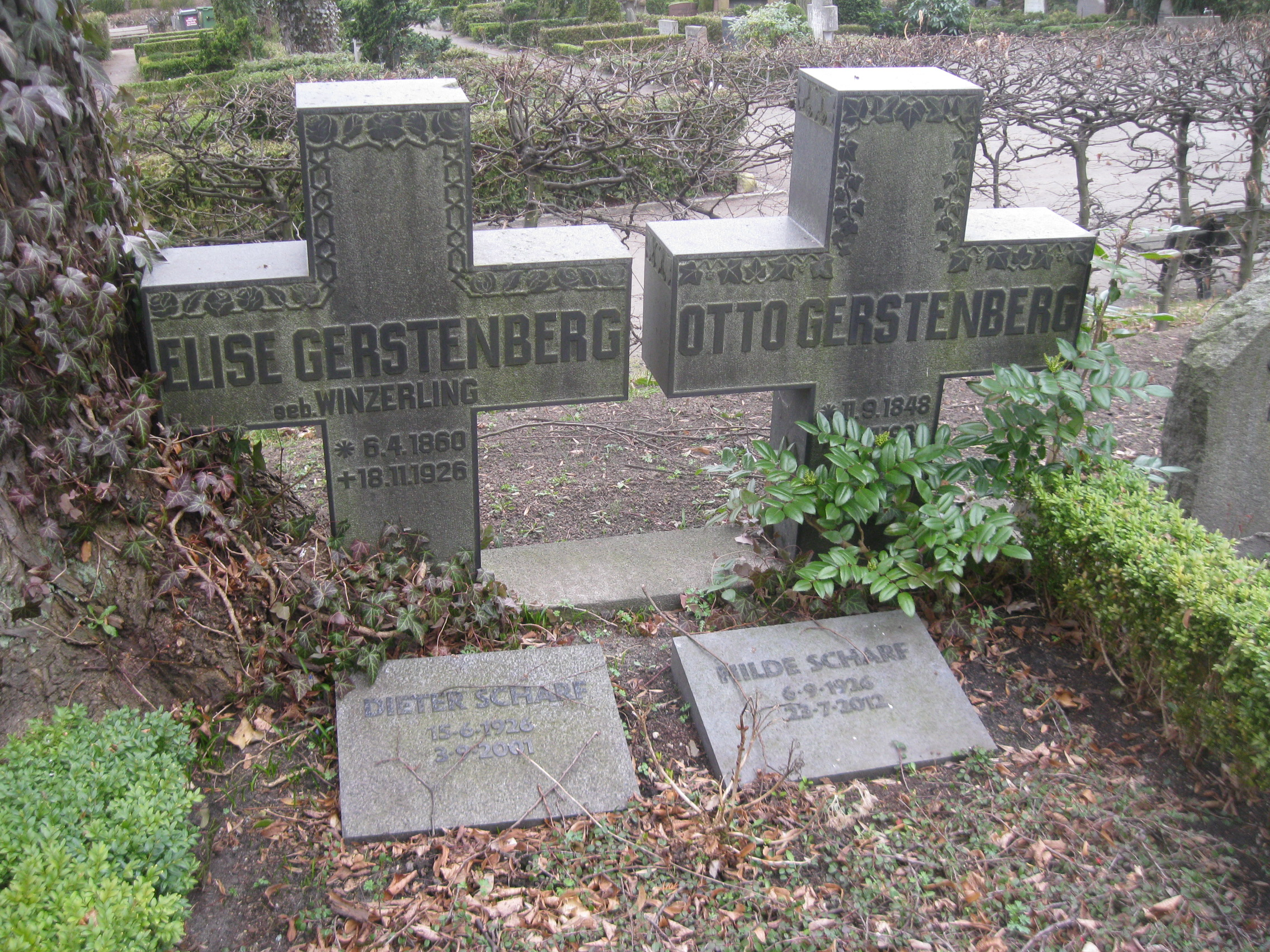
Headstone of Gerstenberg in Berlin

Otto Gerstenberg (11 September 1848 – 24 April 1935) was a German entrepreneur, mathematician and an early 20th-century Berlin art collector.

== Life ==
In his childhood Gerstenberg lived in Pyritz. Gerstenberg studied mathematics and philosophy in Berlin. Since 1873 Gerstenberg worked as mathematician for assurance Allgemeinen Eisenbahn-Versicherungs-Gesellschaft, which later became German assurance Victoria. In 1888, Gerstenberg became member of supervisory board in that assurance and was since 1891 CEO of the assurance.

In 1884, Gerstenberg married Elise Wilhelmine Winzerling, with her he had two daughters. The family home was first at Großbeerenstraße in Berlin-Kreuzberg and later in Berlin-Lichterfelde. His daughter Margarete married physicist Hans Georg Scharf.

Gerstenberg collected art. During World War II, part of his collection was destroyed and other works were seized from Nazi Germany, ending up in Russian museums. His collected paintings went to his daughter, Margarete Scharf, who stored most in the bunker of the Nationalgalerie in Berlin during the war. These were taken to the Soviet Union. Others were put in storage and burned in an air raid. The surviving artworks remained in family ownership and were inherited by his grandson, Dieter Scharf.

Gerstenberg is buried at the St. Annen cemetery in Dahlem, Berlin.

== Art collected by Gerstenberg ==
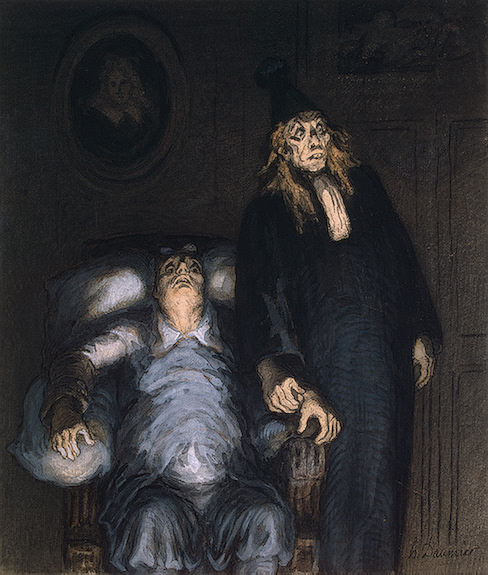
Honoré Daumier:
Der eingebildete Kranke
today: Eremitage
Sankt Petersburg

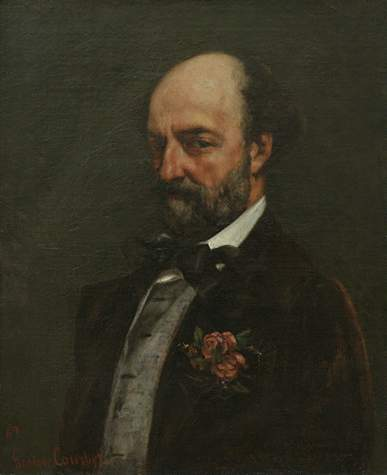
Gustave Courbet:
Porträt Gustave Mathieu
today: Sammlung Oskar Reinhart 'Am Römerholz'
Winterthur

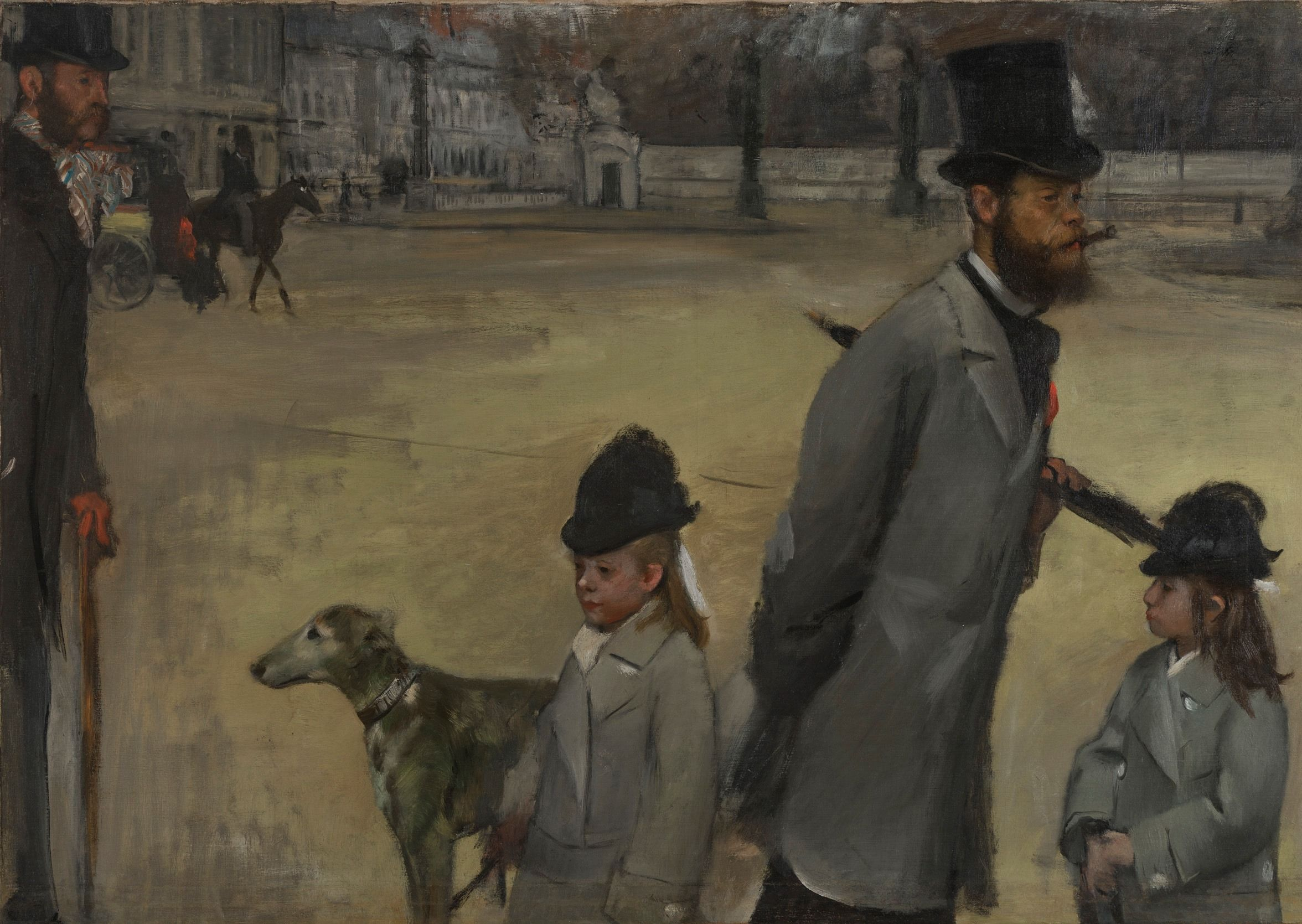
Edgar Degas:
Place de la Concorde
today: Eremitage
Sankt Petersburg

Édouard Manet:
Au café
today: Sammlung Oskar Reinhart 'Am Römerholz'
Winterthur

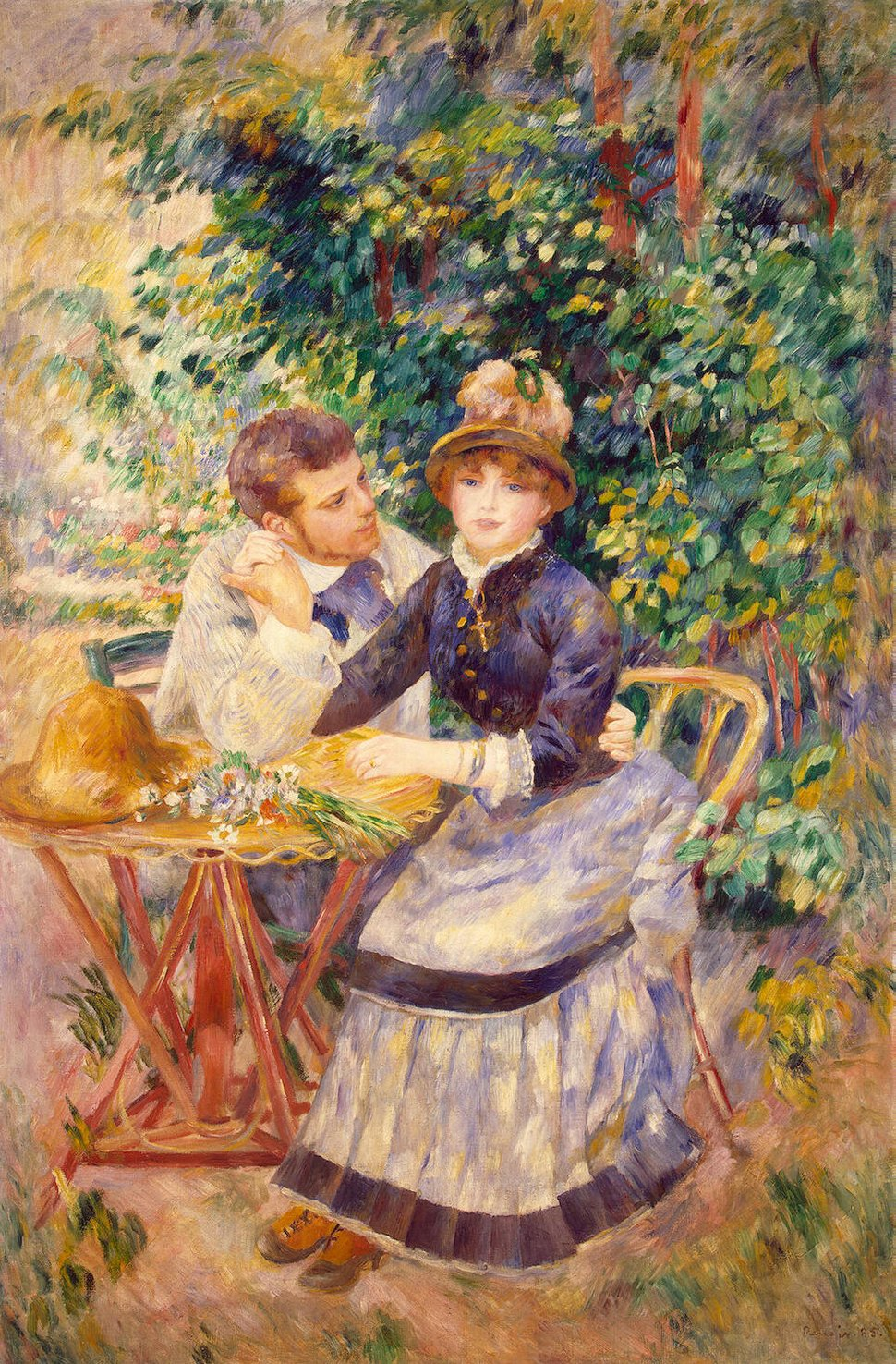
Pierre-Auguste Renoir:
Dans le jardin
today: Eremitage
Sankt Petersburg

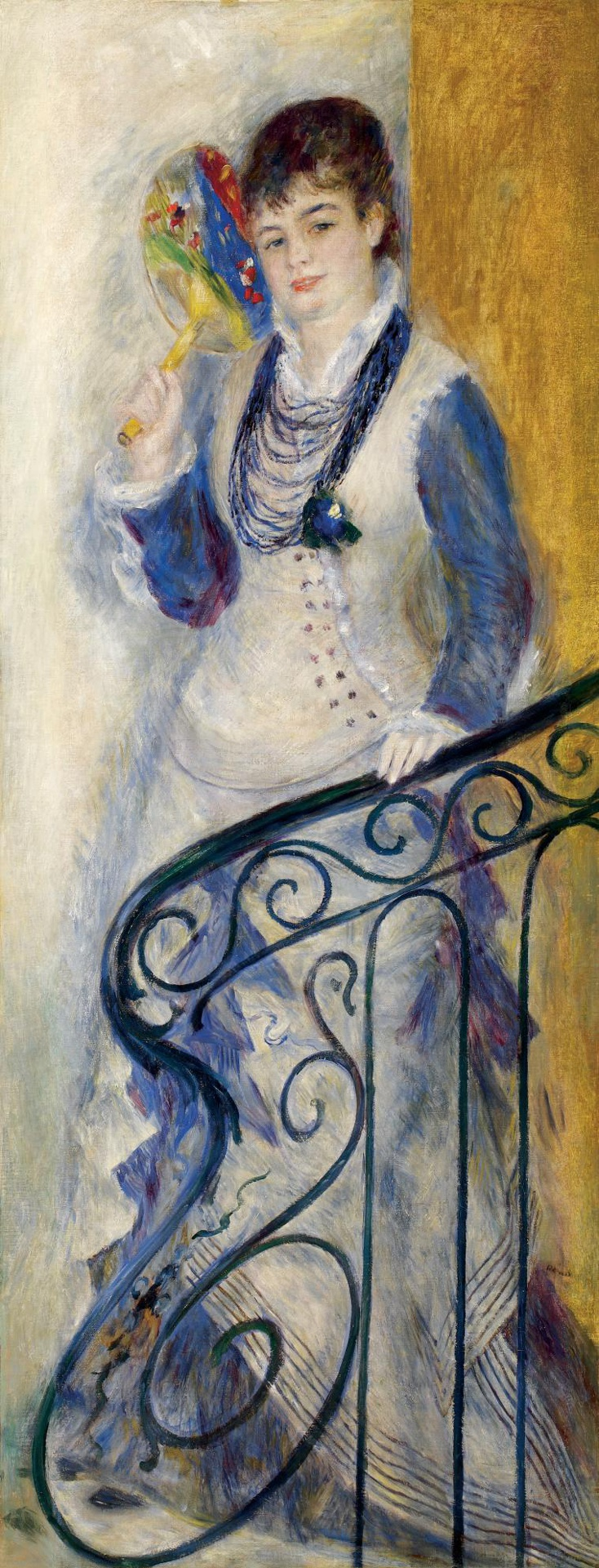
Pierre-Auguste Renoir:
Femme sur un escalier
today: Eremitage
Sankt Petersburg

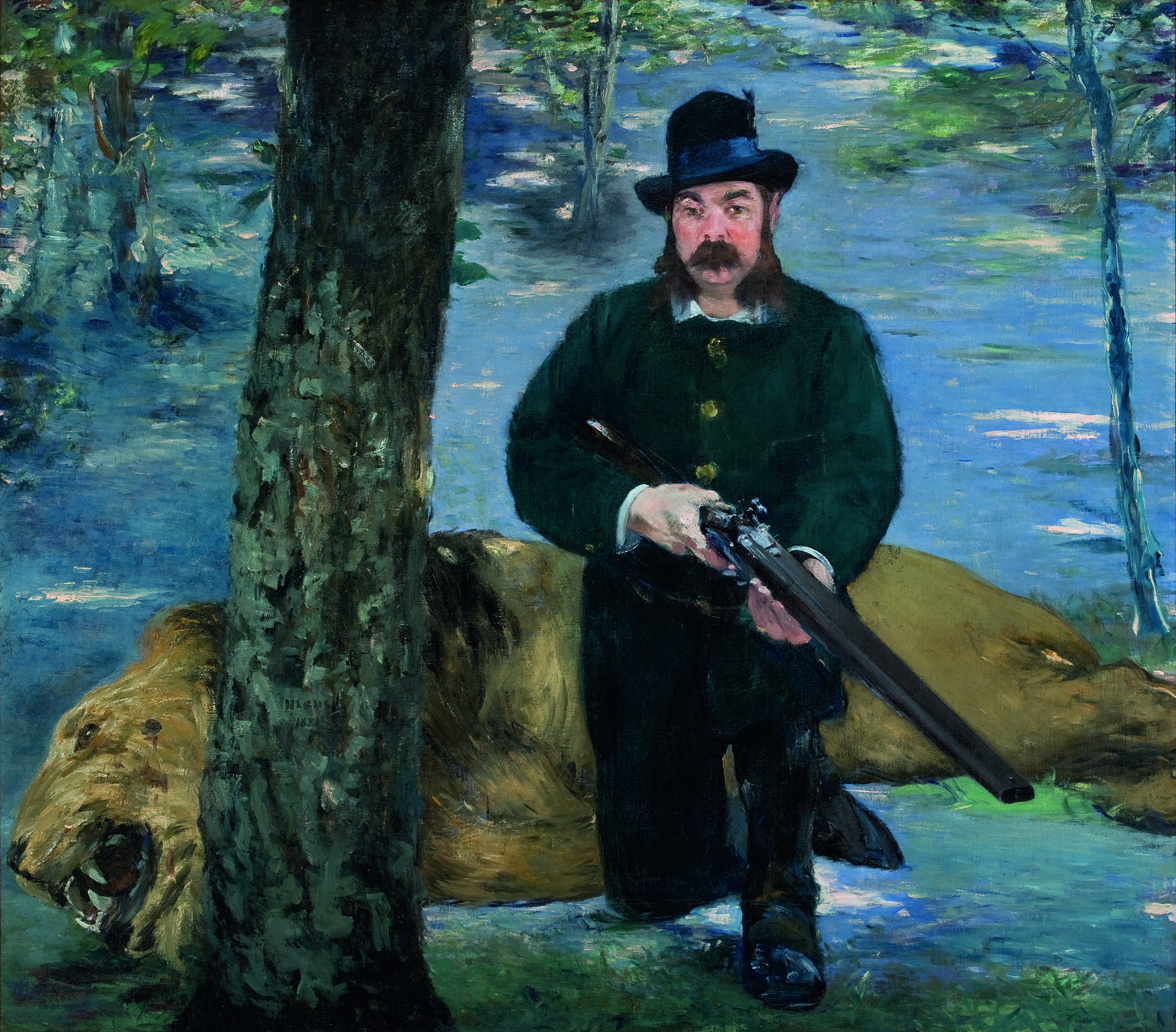
Édouard Manet:
Pertuiset, the lion hunter
today: Museu de Arte
São Paulo

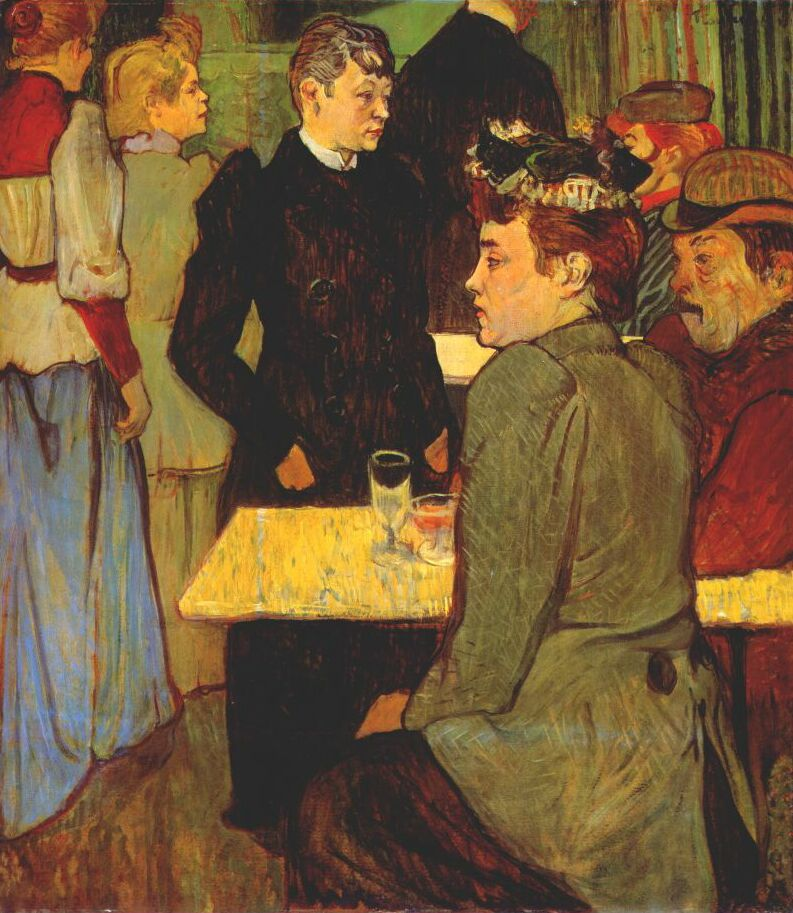
Henri de Toulouse-Lautrec:
Un coin du Moulin de la Galette
today: National Gallery
Washington

== See also ==
- Scharf-Gerstenberg Collection
