= Paul Ortwin Rave =

German art historian and gallery director

- Born: 10 July 1893; Elberfeld
- Died: 16 May 1962 (aged 68); Idar-Oberstein
- Occupations: art historian; gallery director

Paul Ortwin Rave (10 July 1893, Elberfeld – 16 May 1962, Idar-Oberstein) was a German art historian and director of the Berlin National Gallery.

Rave was the son of a pharmacist. From 1918, after participating in the First World War, he studied history of art, classical archaeology and history of literature at the University of Bonn, from where he received doctorate in 1922 with a thesis on the church of St Severus in Boppard and its Romanesque construction. On the recommendation of his teacher Paul Clemen, he then joined the administration of the National Gallery in Berlin, where he was later appointed curator, and also became director of the museum of the Friedrichswerder Church.

Rave collaborated with Ludwig Justi, the then director of the National Gallery, in the establishment of a collection of modern art for the gallery's new department, the Neue Abteilung der Nationalgalerie Berlin im Kronprinzenpalais. Justi was dismissed by the National Socialists in 1933 and replaced by the art historian Alois Schardt (1889–1955). Schardt fell from favour and was succeeded by Eberhard Hanfstaengl (1886–1973), who refused to cooperate in the confiscation of modern works of art for the Degenerate Art exhibition curated by Adolf Ziegler and Wolfgang Willrich. Following this, Rave took temporary charge of the collection at the Kronprinzenpalais in 1937, and became director of the National Gallery whose modernist collections he defended. In this capacity he wanted to acquire works owned by Marie Busch, a collector who had emigrated to England. He retained his position after the Second World War, but resigned in 1950 after the division of Berlin. Until 1961 he was head of Berlin State Museums.

Rave's preferred field of work was Prussian art of the decades around 1800. In particular he focussed on Karl Friedrich Schinkel (1781–1841), and in 1939 became editor of the multi-volume Karl Friedrich Schinkel Lebenswerk, an overview of Schinkel's entire work. In 1949 Rave's book Kunstdiktatur im Dritten Reich (Art Dictatorship in the Third Reich) was published, which critically examined National Socialist art policy, especially the "Degenerate Art" campaign.

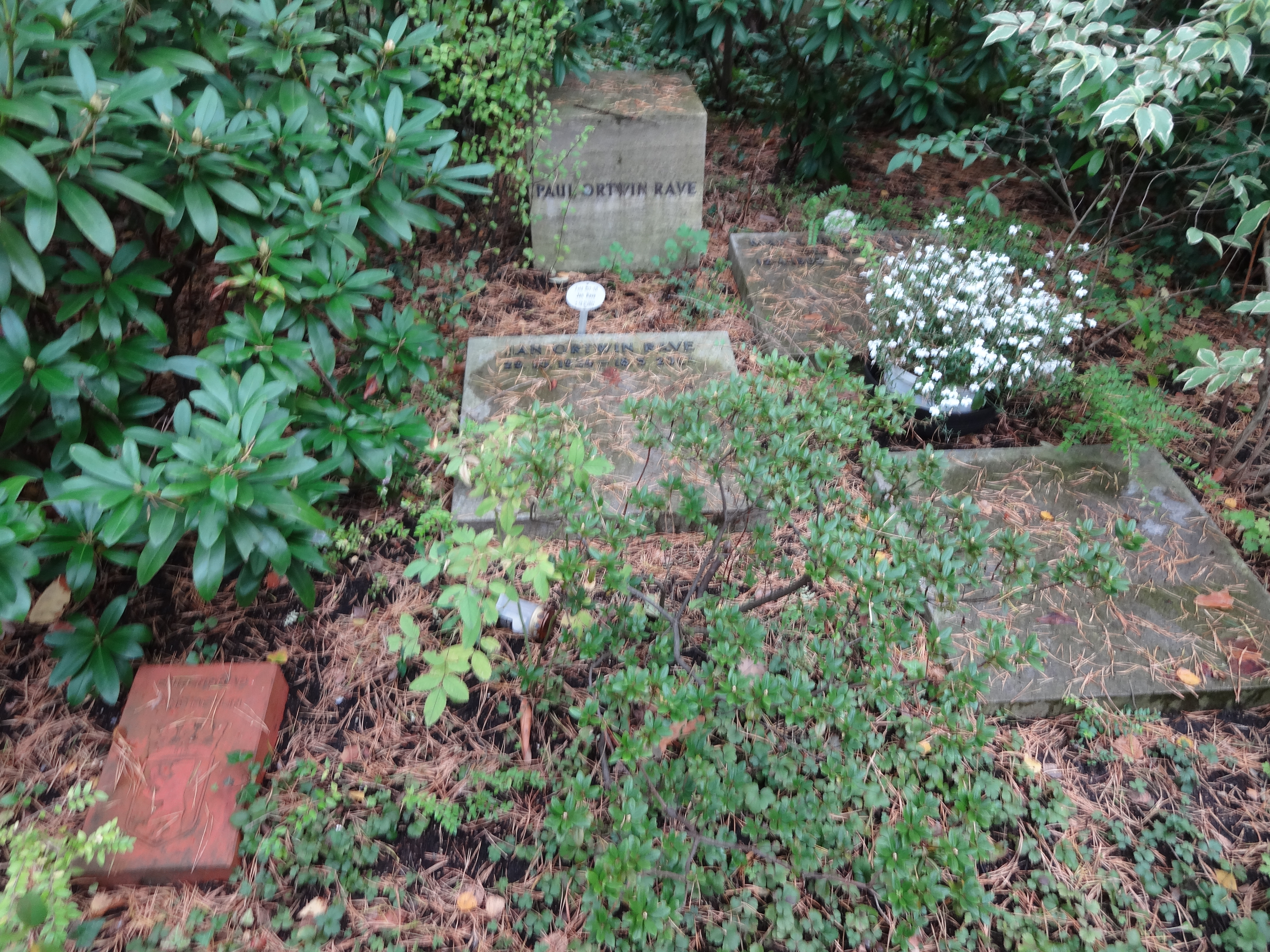
Paul Ortwin Rave's grave at the Waldfriedhof Zehlendorf (Zehlendorf forest cemetery)

Paul Ortwin Rave died in Idar-Oberstein in 1962 at the age of 68 years. He was interred at the Waldfriedhof Zehlendorf in Berlin. His grave was listed between 1992 and 2014 as one of the graves of honour of the State of Berlin, as such recognizing those making outstanding achievement, awarded for a period of twenty years by Senate resolution. Rave married the painter Maria Theresia Rave-Faensen (1903-1987), in 1933. Their two sons Jan Rave (1934-2004) and Rolf Rave (born 1936) both became architects. The architect and conservator of monuments Wilhelm Rave (1886-1958) was his brother. In 1953 Rave was awarded the Order of Merit of the Federal Republic of Germany.

== Selected publications ==
- Temples of Italy, Verlag des Kunstgeschichtlichen Seminars der Universität (university art history seminar), Frankfurt (1924)
- Rave, Paul Ortwin; "Die alten Gärten und ländlichen Parke in der Mark Brandenburg", Brandenburgische Jahrbücher, 14, 15, Potsdam, Berlin (1939)
- Günther, H. F.; The Face of Romanticism. Portraits and self-portraits of German artists, Stuttgart (1946)
- The History of the National Gallery Berlin, National Gallery of the State Museums of Prussian Cultural Heritage, Berlin (1968)
- Writings on Artists and the Arts, selected and edited Stephan Waetzoldt, Gerd Hatje, Stuttgart (1994)
