= National Gallery (Berlin) =

Art museum in Berlin, Germany

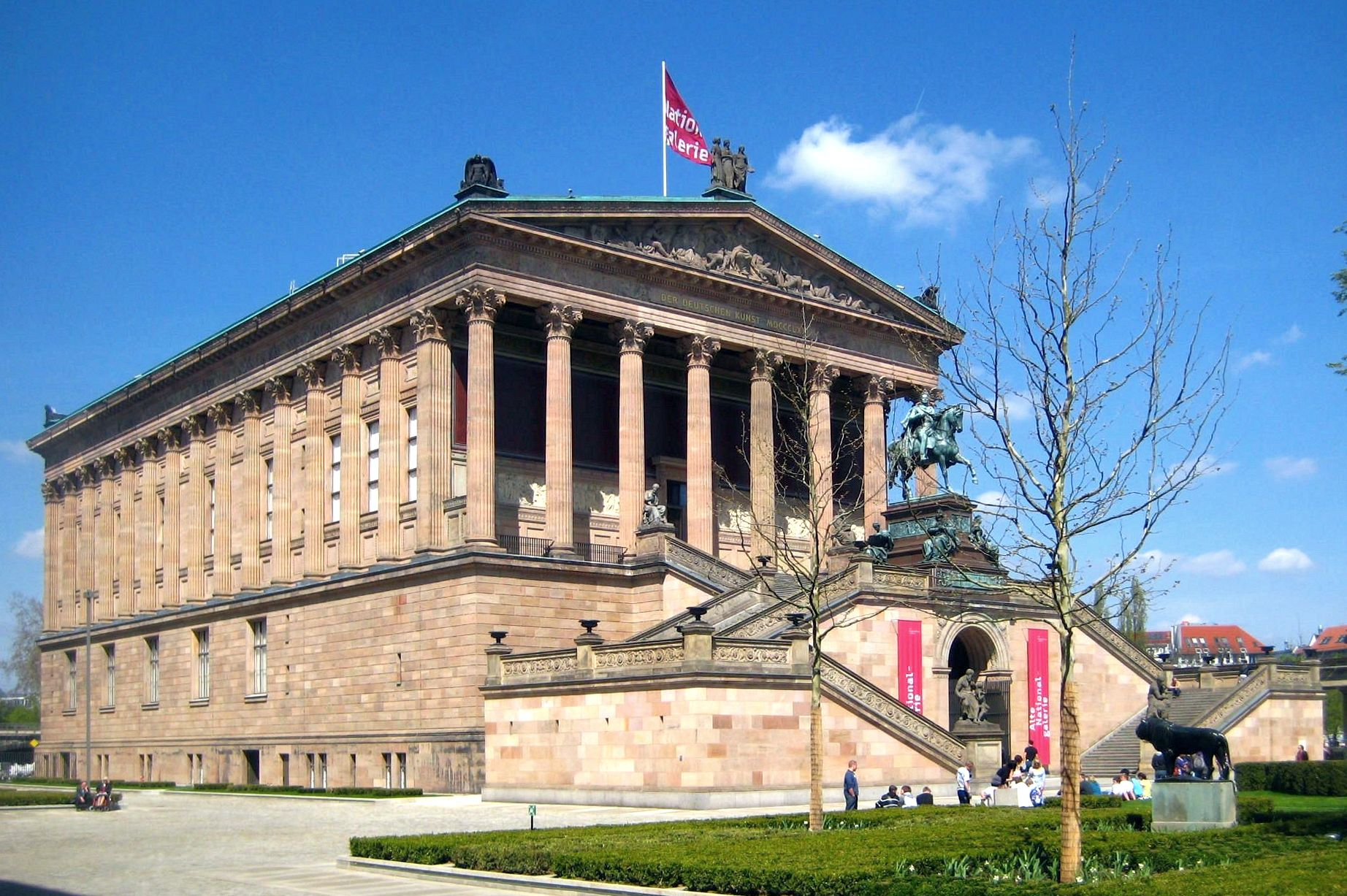
Original building of the National Gallery in Berlin, now the Alte Nationalgalerie

The National Gallery (German: Nationalgalerie) in Berlin, Germany, is a museum for art of the 19th, 20th and 21st centuries. It is part of the Berlin State Museums. From the Alte Nationalgalerie, which was built for it and opened in 1876, its exhibition space has expanded to include five other locations. The museums are part of the Berlin State Museums, owned by the Prussian Cultural Heritage Foundation.

== Locations ==
The holdings of the National Gallery are currently shown in five locations:

- Alte Nationalgalerie: 19th-century art, on Museum Island
- Neue Nationalgalerie: 20th-century art, at the Kulturforum. The building, designed by Ludwig Mies van der Rohe, opened on 15 September 1968.
- Berggruen Museum: in Charlottenburg, showing classics of 20th-century modern art collected by Heinz Berggruen; added to the National Gallery in 1996.
- Scharf-Gerstenberg Collection: in Charlottenburg, showing 20th-century art from French Romanticism to Surrealism; added to the National Gallery in 2008.
- Hamburger Bahnhof: Museum für Gegenwart, contemporary art; added to the National Gallery in 1996.
- Friedrichswerder Church: 19th-century sculpture, a church designed by Karl Friedrich Schinkel, opened as an annexe of the National Gallery in September 1987. From 2012 to 2020 the building was closed owing to structural damage.

== History ==
=== Planning, foundation and construction of the original building ===
There was long discussion of the desirability of establishing a national gallery in Berlin, particularly during the period of revolutionary nationalism around 1848, and it became an increasingly serious proposition from 1850, when publications appeared advocating it. From the start it was bound up with the ambitions of Prussia and the wish for Berlin to become a capital of world renown. The decision was finally taken in 1861, after the death of the banker and art patron Joachim Heinrich Wilhelm Wagener, who bequeathed his extensive collection (262 artworks) to the then Prince Regent, the future King William I, in the hope of catalysing the formation of a gallery of "more recent" art. The collection was initially known as the Wagenersche und Nationalgalerie (Wagener and National Gallery) and was housed in the buildings of the Prussian Academy of Arts.

Friedrich August Stüler began working on a design for a gallery building in 1863, based on a sketch by William I's brother, King Frederick William IV of Prussia. Two years and two failed plans later, his third proposal was finally accepted. Stüler died before planning was completed and Carl Busse handled the remaining details in 1865. In 1866, by order of the King and his cabinet, the Kommission für den Bau der Nationalgalerie (Commission for the construction of the national gallery) was created. Ground was broken in 1867 under the supervision of Heinrich Strack. In 1872 the structure was completed and interior work began. The opening took place on March 22, 1876 in the presence of William I, who was by then German Emperor.

The building, today the Alte Nationalgalerie, resembles a Greco-Roman temple (a form chosen for its symbolism that, it has been pointed out, is not well suited to displaying art) and is stylistically a combination of late Classicism and early Neo-Renaissance. It was intended to express "the unity of art, nation, and history", and therefore has aspects reminiscent of a church (with an apse) and a theatre (a grand staircase leading to the entry) as well as a temple. An equestrian statue of Frederick William IV tops the stairs, and the inside stairs have a frieze by Otto Geyer depicting German history from prehistoric times to the 19th century. The inscription over the door reads "To German art, 1871" (the year of the founding of the Empire, not the year the gallery was completed). On his first visit to Berlin, in November 1916, the young Adolf Hitler sent a postcard of this building to a comrade in arms to congratulate him on receiving the Iron Cross.

=== Until 1933 ===
The first director of the National Gallery was Max Jordan, who was appointed in 1874, before the building was completed. When the building opened, in addition to Wagener's collection, it contained over 70 cartoons for friezes on mythological and religious subjects by Peter von Cornelius; high-ceilinged galleries were designed to accommodate them. Wagener's collection was not limited to German art; in particular, it included Belgian artists who were popular at the time; and under Jordan the gallery's holdings rapidly came to include an unusually large collection of sculpture and a drawings department. However, Jordan was hampered throughout his tenure by the Regional Art Commission, which was made up of representatives of the academic art establishment and resisted all attempts to acquire modernist art.

In 1896, he was succeeded as director by Hugo von Tschudi, formerly assistant head of the Berlin museums under Wilhelm von Bode. Although he had previously had no association with modern art, he was fired with enthusiasm for Impressionism on a visit to Paris where he was introduced to the art dealer Paul Durand-Ruel, and became determined to acquire a representative collection of Impressionist art for the National Gallery. When the commission vetoed his requests, he secured the patronage of a large number of wealthy bourgeois art collectors, most of them Jewish. He also rearranged the exhibition spaces, putting many items in storage to make room for works by Manet, Monet, Degas and Rodin as well as the earlier Constable and Courbet. One of the first, soon after Tschudi took up the post, was Manet's In the Conservatory; in 1897, the Berlin National Gallery became the first museum in the world to acquire a painting by Cézanne. This moved the gallery decisively away from emphasis on Prussia and the rest of the German Empire. In response to complaints from the academic connoisseurs, William II decreed in 1899 that all acquisitions for the National Gallery must have his personal authorisation; Tschudi initially complied and rehung the old works, but the imperial decree proved unenforceable, prompting the Kaiser to build public monuments to his power instead. In 1901, at the inauguration of the memorials on the Siegesallee, he gave a speech denouncing "gutter art" which became known as the Rinnsteinrede (gutter speech).

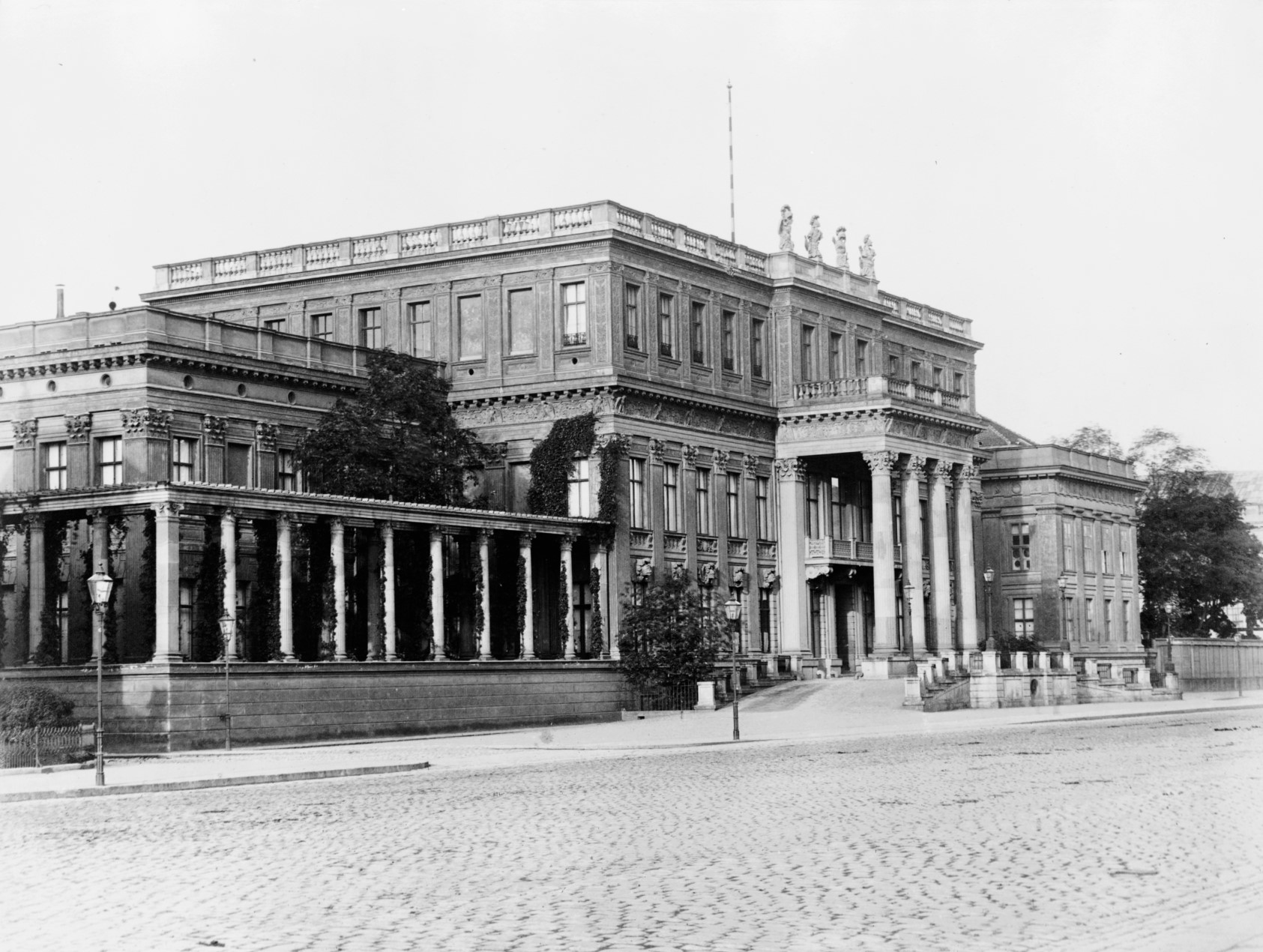
Late 19th-century view of the Crown Prince's Palace, which became the National Gallery's annexe for modern art in 1919

Tschudi also had a great appreciation for the German Romantics, many of whose paintings were included in Wagener's original bequest. An exhibition of 100 years of German art at the National Gallery in 1906 contributed to reawakening interest in artists such as Caspar David Friedrich. This was also an interest shared by Tschudi's successor, Ludwig Justi, who was director from 1909 to 1933 and added to the gallery's holdings in early 19th-century German painting.

In 1919, after the abolition of the Prussian monarchy, the gallery acquired the Crown Prince's Palace (Kronprinzenpalais) and used it to display the modern art. This became known as the Neue Abteilung (New Department) or National Gallery II, and met the demand by contemporary artists for a Gallery of Living Artists. It opened with works by the Berlin Secessionists, the Impressionists and the Expressionists. This was the first state promotion of Expressionist works, which were unpopular with large numbers of the public, but the collection was, in the judgement of Justi's assistant Alfred Hentzen, superior to that of all other German galleries then collecting modern art. By far the largest share of artworks in the 1937 exhibition of 'Degenerate Art' under the Nazis were taken from this collection.

=== Nazi Germany ===
Justi was one of 27 art gallery and museum heads forced out by the Nazis in 1933 under the Law for the Restoration of the Professional Civil Service, to be succeeded for a few months by Alois Schardt and then by Eberhard Hanfstaengl, who was in turn dismissed in 1937; he had refused to meet with the commission under Adolf Ziegler, president of the Reich Chamber for the Visual Arts, who were charged with purging the gallery of "degenerate" works. Some artwork from a dealer had been burnt in the furnaces of the National Gallery building in 1936, and the modern art annexe in the Crown Prince's Palace was shut down in 1937 as a "hotbed of cultural Bolshevism". The gallery was placed under the control of the Berlin State Museums and Hanfstaengl was after a while replaced by Paul Ortwin Rave, who despite being more acceptable to the Nazi regime, conscientiously guarded the artworks and as the war drew to an end, went with them to the mine where they were to be stored for safety's sake and was there when the Red Army arrived. He remained in charge of the gallery until 1950.

=== Post-war ===
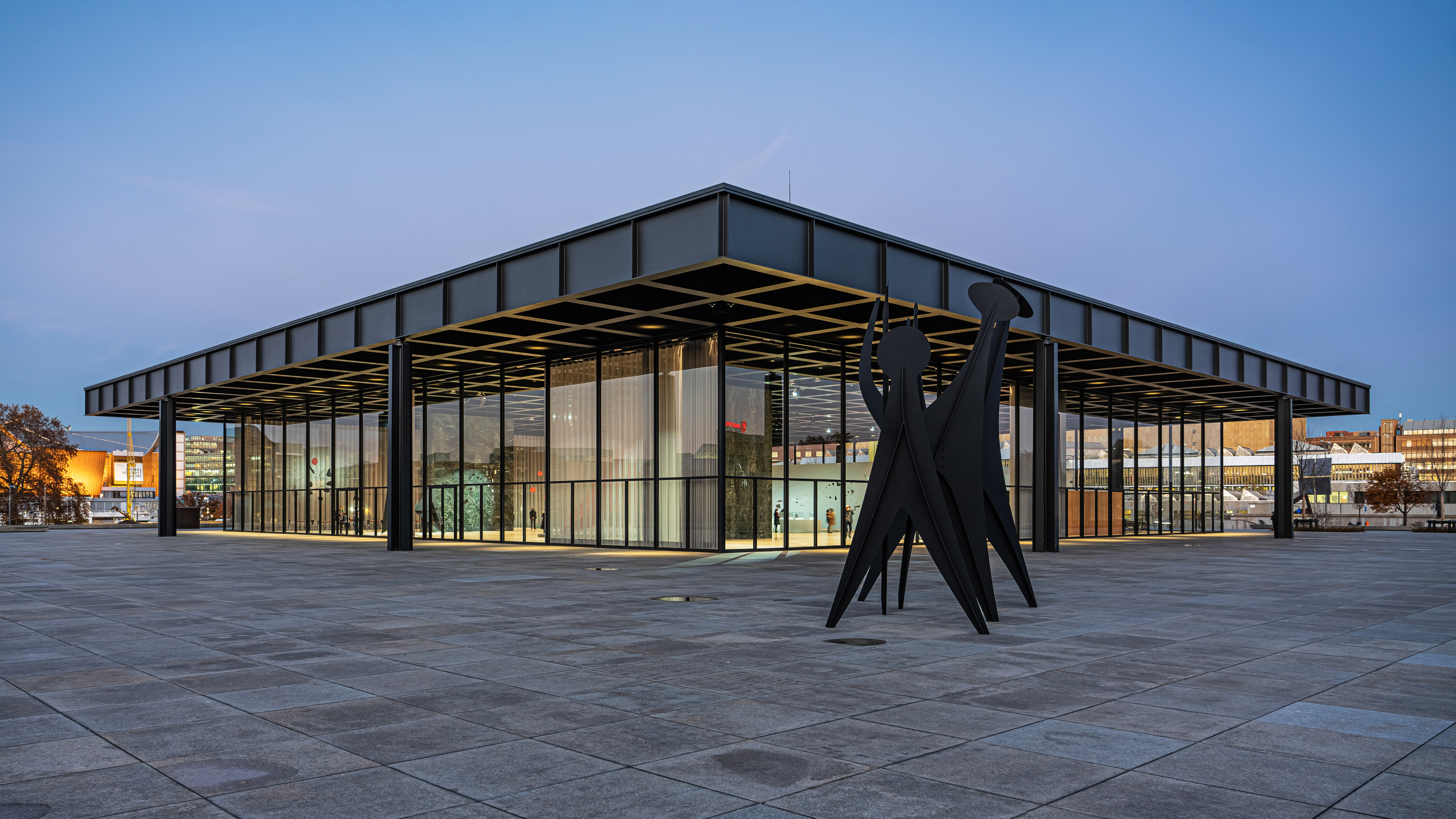
The second National Gallery building, the 1968 Neue Nationalgalerie

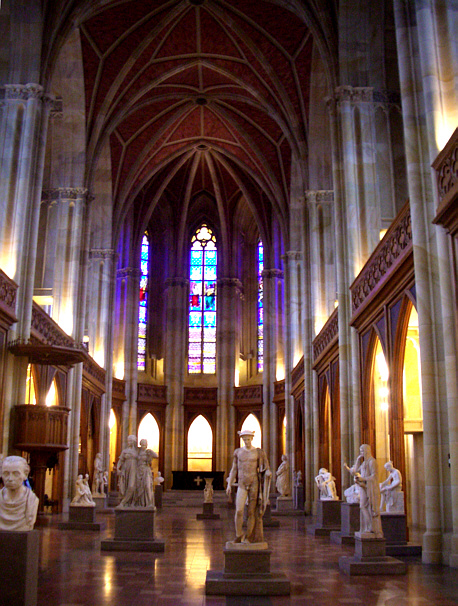
19th-century sculpture on exhibit in the Friedrichswerder Church

After the Second World War, the gallery and the other museums on Museum Island were located in the Soviet Occupation Zone which became East Berlin. The National Gallery's collection, much of it confiscated and then returned by the various occupying powers, was split between East and West and had been further diminished by the war; 19th-century paintings from the former annexe had been destroyed by fire. While the Alte Nationalgalerie building was renovated, in the Western sector, paintings were initially housed in Charlottenburg Palace. West Berlin founded a new museum of 20th-century art in 1949; this was eventually merged with the Western branch of the National Gallery, and West Berlin then created its own cultural centre, the Kulturforum, which included the Neue Nationalgalerie (New National Gallery), a modernist building designed by Ludwig Mies van der Rohe. This opened on 15 September 1968 and initially exhibited the full range of 19th and 20th-century art. Werner Haftmann, who had become the director in 1967, said he was nervous about the gallery moving into the prestige modern building, comparing himself to "a wretched learner ... getting into a luxury Mercedes."

The Friedrichswerder Church, a Gothic landmark designed by Karl Friedrich Schinkel, was ruined in the war; between 1979 and 1986 it was restored, and it was then reopened in September 1987, as part of the celebrations of Berlin's 750th anniversary, as an annexe of the National Gallery displaying 19th-century sculpture. There is a Schinkel museum in the gallery.

Following German reunification, the old building was extensively renovated and the new building is now used for 20th-century art and the old building for 19th-century art.

In 1996, while the Alte Nationalgalerie was still being slowly renovated, two further exhibition spaces were added for modern art. In September, the Berggruen Museum, housing Heinz Berggruen's collection of modern classics, especially focussed on Picasso, opened in the western of a pair of neoclassical buildings opposite the Charlottenburg Palace, like the Alte Nationalgalerie designed by Friedrich August Stüler as realisations of sketches by Frederick William IV; it had housed the West Berlin Museum of Antiquities until that collection was returned to Museum Island after German reunification. Berggruen initially leased the collection to the Berlin State Museums for a ten-year period, but in 2000 sold it to them for a small fraction of its assessed value. In November, the Hamburger Bahnhof, formerly a museum of technology but ruined in the war, opened after a six-year renovation as the Museum für Gegenwart, housing contemporary art, initially most from Erich Marx's collection.

In 2008, the Scharf-Gerstenberg Collection of 20th-century art opened in the eastern Stüler building, which had housed the Egyptian Collection until it moved back to Museum Island. The collection is on a ten-year lease from the Stiftung Sammlung Dieter Scharf zur Erinnerung an Otto Gerstenberg (foundation of the Dieter Scharf collection in remembrance of Otto Gerstenberg), which focusses on the fantastic and the surreal and was built by Dieter Scharf based on some of the works in his grandfather Otto Gerstenberg's collection.

In December 2011, it was announced that the Old Masters currently displayed in the Gemäldegalerie in the Kulturforum would be moved out to make way for a representative permanent exhibition of modern art, for which the Neue Nationalgalerie does not have adequate space.

=== Directors ===
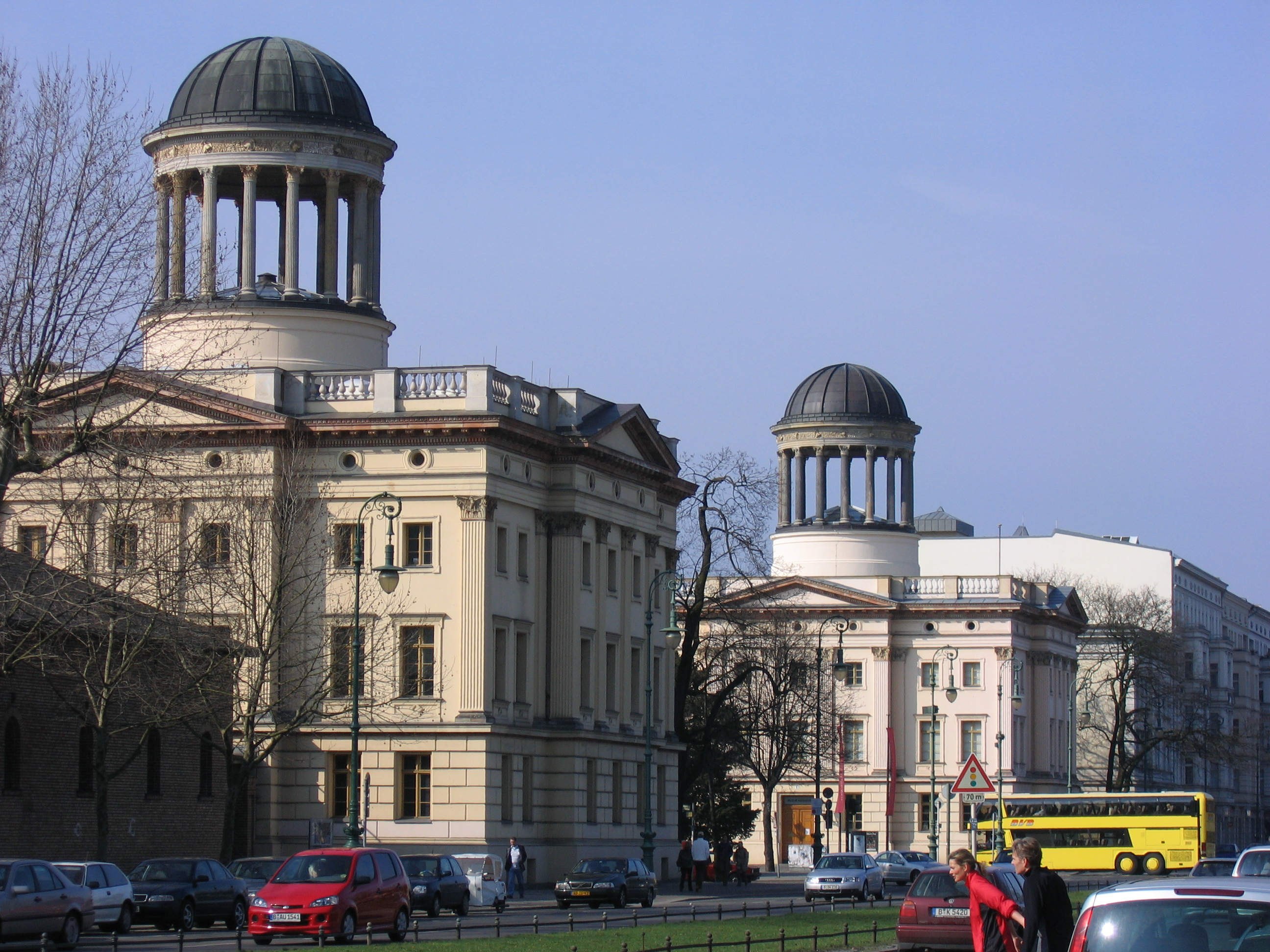
The two Stüler buildings in Charlottenburg: on the left, Scharf-Gerstenberg Collection; on the right, Berggruen Museum

- 1874–1895: Max Jordan
- 1896–1908: Hugo von Tschudi
- 1909–1933: Ludwig Justi
- 1933–1937: Eberhard Hanfstaengl
- 1937–1950: Paul Ortwin Rave
- 1950–1957: Ludwig Justi
- 1957–1964: Leopold Reidemeister
- 1965–1966: Stefan Waetzold
- 1967–1974: Werner Haftmann
- 1974–1975: Wieland Schmied
- 1975–1997: Dieter Honisch
- 1999–2008: Peter-Klaus Schuster
- 2008–2020: Udo Kittelmann (with Joachim Jäger as deputy director and head of the Neue Nationalgalerie from December 2011)

== See also ==
- Max Silberberg
- List of claims for restitution for Nazi-looted art
- List of national galleries
