= Scharf-Gerstenberg Collection =

Art museum in Berlin

Coordinates: 52°31′09″N 13°17′48″E

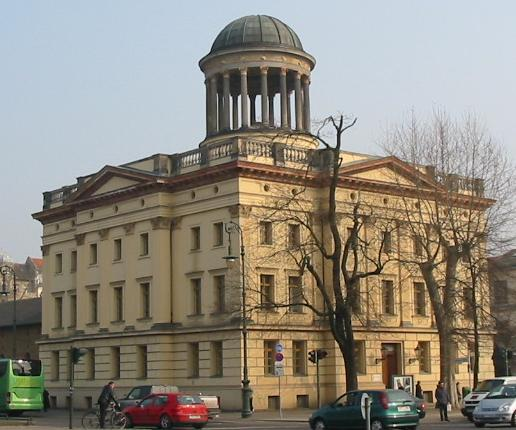
East Stüler Building, home of the Scharf-Gerstenberg Collection since 2008

Scharf-Gerstenberg Collection, Berlin

The Scharf-Gerstenberg Collection (German: Sammlung Scharf-Gerstenberg) is an art museum in Berlin. Its collection of paintings, graphics and sculptures, spanning the period from French Romanticism to Surrealism, is currently housed in former rooms of the Egyptian Museum in Charlottenburg on a ten-year loan. It was founded in 2008, and is part of the National Gallery of Berlin.

== The foundation ==
The works on display are owned by the Foundation of the Dieter Scharf Collection in Remembrance of Otto Gerstenberg. Otto Gerstenberg was an early 20th-century Berlin art collector, whose collection was partly destroyed and partly seized as plunder (ending up in Russian museums) during the war. After Gerstenberg's death in 1935, his paintings went to his daughter, Margarete Scharf, who stored most in the bunker of the Nationalgalerie in Berlin during the war. These were taken to the Soviet Union. But some were put in storage and burned in an air raid. The surviving artworks remained in family ownership and were inherited by his grandson, Dieter Scharf. This collection of graphics was to be the foundation of Scharf's own acquisitions, and in 2000 Scharf's collection was put on display in Berlin under the name "Surreal Worlds". Shortly before his death in 2001 he transferred these works to the new Foundation. There is currently a ten-year loan agreement between this foundation and the Berlin State Museums, while the Prussian Cultural Heritage Foundation has allowed it the use of the East Stüler Building in Charlottenburg.

== The building ==
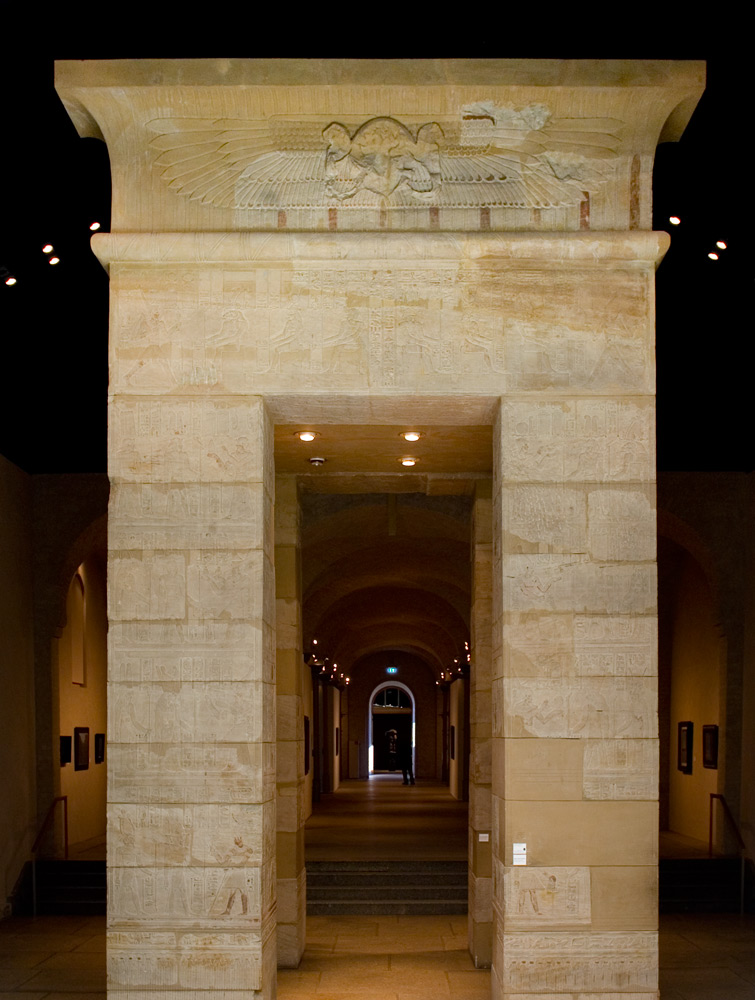
The Temple Gate of Kalabsha

The Scharf-Gerstenberg Collection is located on Schloßstraße, opposite the present-day Berggruen Museum (in the West Stüler Building). Both buildings are separated from Charlottenburg Palace by the Spandau Dam. They originate from designs by the Prussian king Frederick William IV, implemented by the architect Friedrich August Stüler from 1851 to 1859. Both the Stüler Buildings originally served as officer barracks for the Gardes du Corps regiment. The East Building is part of the old Marstall Building (constructed 1855-58 by Wilhelm Drewitz), and together these two housed the Egyptian Museum between 1967 and 2005. From 2005 to 2008 they were renovated for future use by the Scharf-Gerstenberg Museum, under the architectural direction of Gregor Sunder-Plassmann.

== The collection ==
The works inherited by Dieter Scharf from his grandfather's collection include graphics by Goya, Hugo, Klinger, Manet, Meryon and Piranesi. The works by these artists formed the foundation on which Scharf built his own collection of symbolist and surrealist art.

Besides paintings by Dalí, Dubuffet, Ernst, Magritte, Masson, Moreau, Redon, Rousseau and Tanguy, as well as sculptures by Ernst, Laurens, Lipchitz and Tàpies, the key works of the collection are graphics, following the example set by Gerstenberg. Other artists in the collection include Baumeister, Bellmer, Brauner, Éluard, Ensor, Giacometti, Grosz, Janssen, Klee, Léger, Miró, Munch, Oelze, Picabia, Picasso, Schwitters, Seurat, Tobey, and Wols.

The Scharf-Gerstenberg Collection thematically complements the exhibition "Picasso and His Time" in the Berggruen Museum located opposite. Some artists, such as Picasso, Klee and Giacometti, are featured in both collections. The Kalabsha Gate and the columns from the ancient Sahure Temple, both owned by the Egyptian Museum, will also be on display in the Scharf-Gerstenberg Museum until the completion of the Pergamon Museum's fourth exhibition wing.
