= Adolf Ziegler =

German painter (1892–1959)

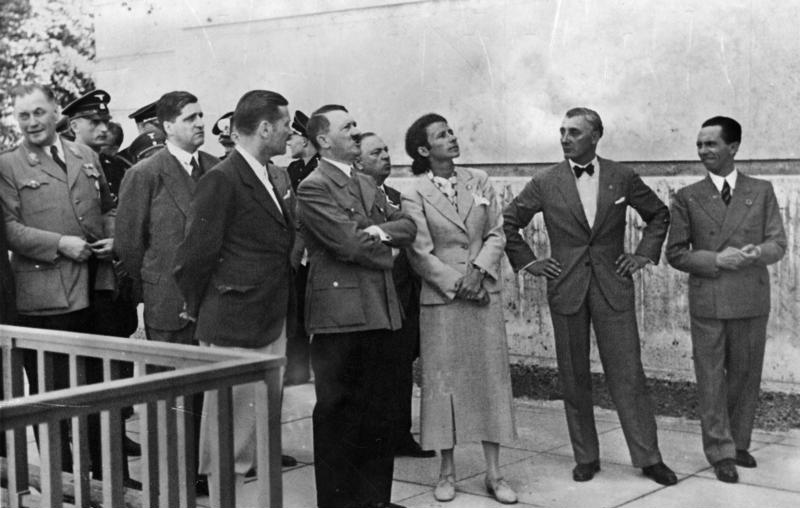
- Adolf Hitler, architect Gerdy Troost wife of Paul Ludwig Troost, Adolf Ziegler (with bowtie), and Joseph Goebbels at the opening of the House of German Art (Haus der Deutschen Kunst), May 1937
- Born: 16 October 1892; Bremen, German Empire
- Died: 11 September 1959 (aged 66); Varnhalt (near Baden-Baden), West Germany
- Education: Academy of Fine Arts Munich
- Known for: Painting
- Notable work: Judgement of Paris (1937)
- Elected: President of the Reich Chamber of Art, 1936

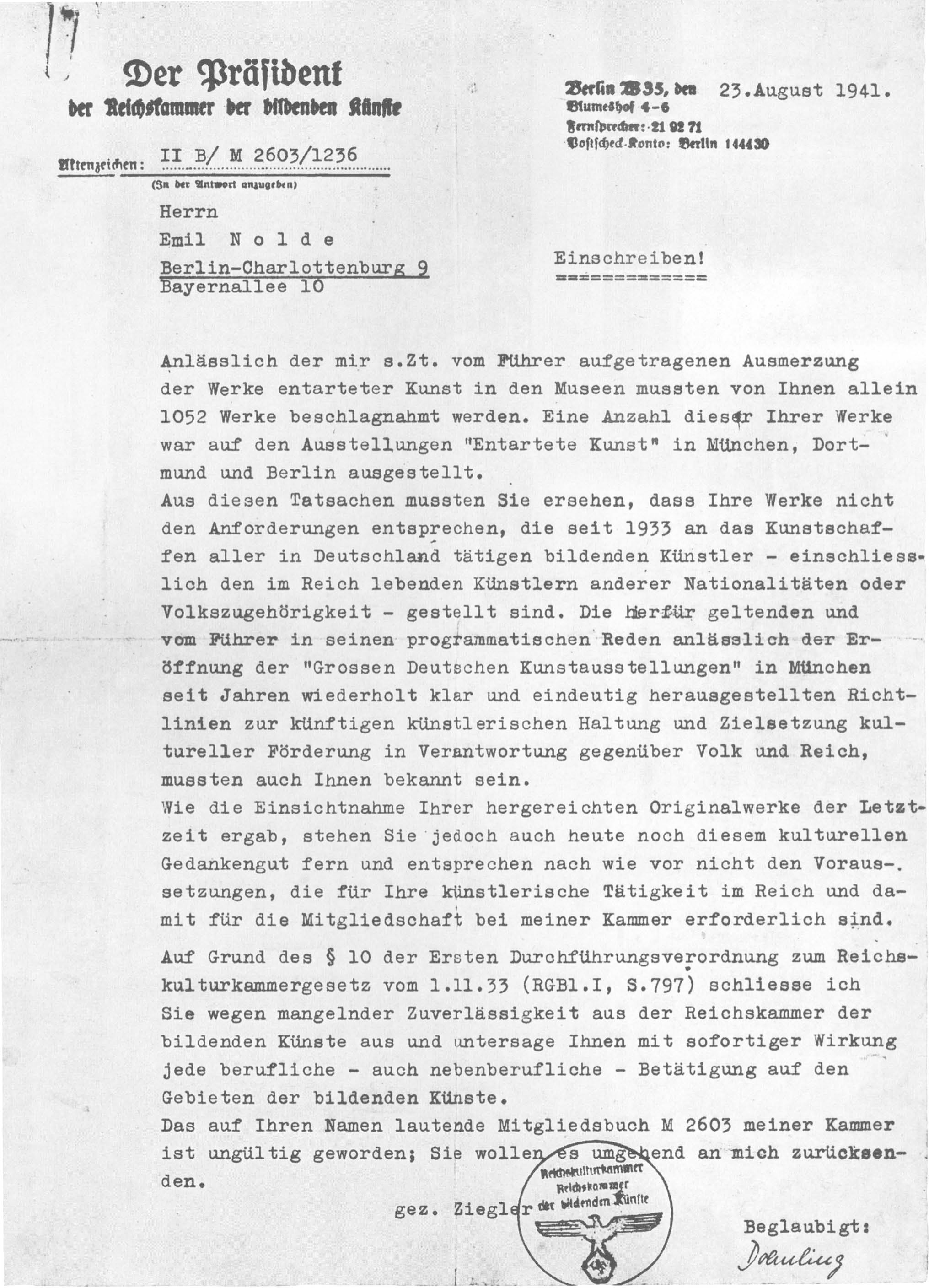
Letter to Emil Nolde in 1941 from Adolf Ziegler, who declares that Nolde's art is degenerate art, and forbids him to paint.

Adolf Ziegler (16 October 1892 – 11 September 1959) was a German painter and politician. He was tasked by the Nazi Party to oversee the purging of what the NSDAP described as "degenerate art", by most of the German modernist artists. Ziegler's triptych painting, The Four Elements, hung above the mantel in Hitler's Munich apartment. He was reputedly Adolf Hitler's "favourite painter".

== Life ==
Born in Bremen to an architect father and a family of architects on his mother's side, Ziegler was surrounded by artists. He studied at the Weimar Academy from 1910 under master of technique Max Doerner at the Academy of Fine Arts, Munich. However, the First World War interrupted his studies when he signed up to become a front-line officer. After the war, he settled in Munich and continued his studies at the Academy of Fine Arts, Munich in 1919, where he attended classes by art nouveau artist Angelo Jank.

He ultimately achieved the position of professor at the Munich Academy in 1933, when the Nazis came to power. His works fitted the Nazi ideal of "racially pure" art, and, as the President of the Reich Chamber for the Visual Arts, he was entrusted with the task of eliminating avant-garde styles. He did this via expelling expressionist artists such as Karl Schmidt-Rottluff. Writing to Schmidt-Rottluff, he forbade him from any artistic activity "professional or amateur".

Already a member of the Nazi Party in the early 1920s, he met future-Führer Adolf Hitler 1925 and became one of his advisors in artistic matters. Hitler commissioned Ziegler to paint a memoriam portrait of his niece—Geli Raubal—who had committed suicide. In 1937 he painted the Judgement of Paris, which Hitler personally acquired some time later, hanging it in his residence at Munich—Hitler later also hung Ziegler's The Four Elements at said residence as well. It became an overnight sensation through frequent reproduction.

This painting was much liked, judging by the enormous numbers of postcards and reproductions of it sold. The Nazi celebrations of the human figure without conflict or suffering were immensely popular. By this time, Ziegler had become the foremost official painter of the Nazi Germany and was awarded the Golden Party Badge, in recognition for outstanding service to the NSDAP or the state.

Not much is known about his early works except that his early style exhibited modernist forms. Exiled museum director Alois Schardt noted in the late thirties that Ziegler was:

" [...] in former times a modern painter and a zealous admirer of the works of Franz Marc [...] His transmutation proceeded by slow degrees [...] before he took this position, he was one of the most extreme modern painters, but one of inferior rank."

There are no examples of such early works. He gave up the modern style for a representational and realistic style in the 1920s, during which time he had increased contact with Hitler. Ziegler exhibited eleven canvases at the Great German Art Exhibitions at the House of German Art between 1937–1943. A technically accomplished painter, Ziegler was known for mainly floral compositions, genre paintings, allegorical paintings inspired by Greek mythology, portraits, and numerous female nudes. His static, pseudo-classical nudes depicted ideal Aryan figures.

In an interview with American playwright Barrie Stavis, Ziegler explained that a painting of a "beautiful" nude German woman encourages the ideal of a perfect body and gives German men the incentive to have many German children. However, the artistic "naturalism" earnined him the disparaging nickname of Meister des Deutschen Schamhaares ("Master of German pubic hair").

=== Role in the Degenerate Art exhibition ===
Ziegler occupied several important administrative positions during the Third Reich. He was appointed Senator of the Fine Arts at the Reich Chamber of Culture in 1935. Propaganda Minister Joseph Goebbels later appointed him to the Presidential Council, then vice-president of the Reich Chamber of Art. Finally, on December 1, 1936, he succeeded architect Eugen Hönig as president of the Chamber of Art, which then had 45,000 members. Ziegler's replacement of Hönig as president was a clear signal of the Reich's growing distaste for nonconformity in the arts.

Ziegler served as the president of the Prussian Academy of Arts in 1937.

Ziegler headed a five-man commission that toured state collections in numerous cities, hastily seizing works they deemed degenerate. The works were then rushed to Munich for installation in the narrow rooms of the Hofgarten arcade for display, including some 16,000 examples of expressionist, abstract, cubist and surrealist works of art. The paintings of such "degenerate" artists, including the works of Max Beckmann and Emil Nolde, were confiscated on Ziegler's orders as head of the sluice commission. Ziegler managed to organize the Degenerate Art exhibition in Munich in less than two weeks. On July 19, 1937, he opened the exhibition and condemned those museum directors from whose collections the works came and their tolerance of the decadent art. However, his name must not be confused with that of Hans Severus Ziegler, who organized in May 1938 the Entartete Musik—"Degenerate Music"—exhibition in Düsseldorf.

Ziegler's own paintings--including, for example, The Four Elements--were prominently and frequently displayed during the Greater German Art Exhibitions from 1937 through 1944. This series of exhibitions initially formed a counterpoint to the Degenerate Art Exhibition.

=== Second World War and after ===
During the Second World War, Ziegler was temporarily sent to a prison camp after he publicly expressed doubts about the viability of Hitler's campaign. When Hitler was notified of Ziegler's "defeatist" attitude, he ordered his arrest. Ziegler was arrested by the Gestapo and imprisoned in the Dachau concentration camp for six weeks. However, Hitler personally ordered that he be released from Dachau and be allowed to retire.

Because his paintings were so closely associated with Nazism, Ziegler was unable to successfully revive his career as an artist after the war. He repeatedly petitioned for reappointment to the Academy of Fine Arts, Munich from 1955–1958, but was denied because the academy determined that he initially received the position due to Hitler's personal appointment. There were some reports that Ziegler exhibited works in 1955 at the Ben Uri Gallery & Museum in London, but the gallery's records indicate the artist was an "Adolf Zeigler", a Jewish painter from London, not the German Ziegler. He also wrote a response to Paul Ortwin Rave's first-hand accounts of the Entartete Kunst exhibition in Munich, arguing with Rave's assertions. Unable to revive his career, Ziegler lived quietly in the village of Varnhalt near Baden-Baden for the last years of his life. He died 11 September 1959, at the age of sixty-six.

== See also ==
- Glossary of Nazi Germany
- List of Nazi Party leaders and officials
- Lists of painters
