= Edlitz, Austria =

Edlitz
- Municipality
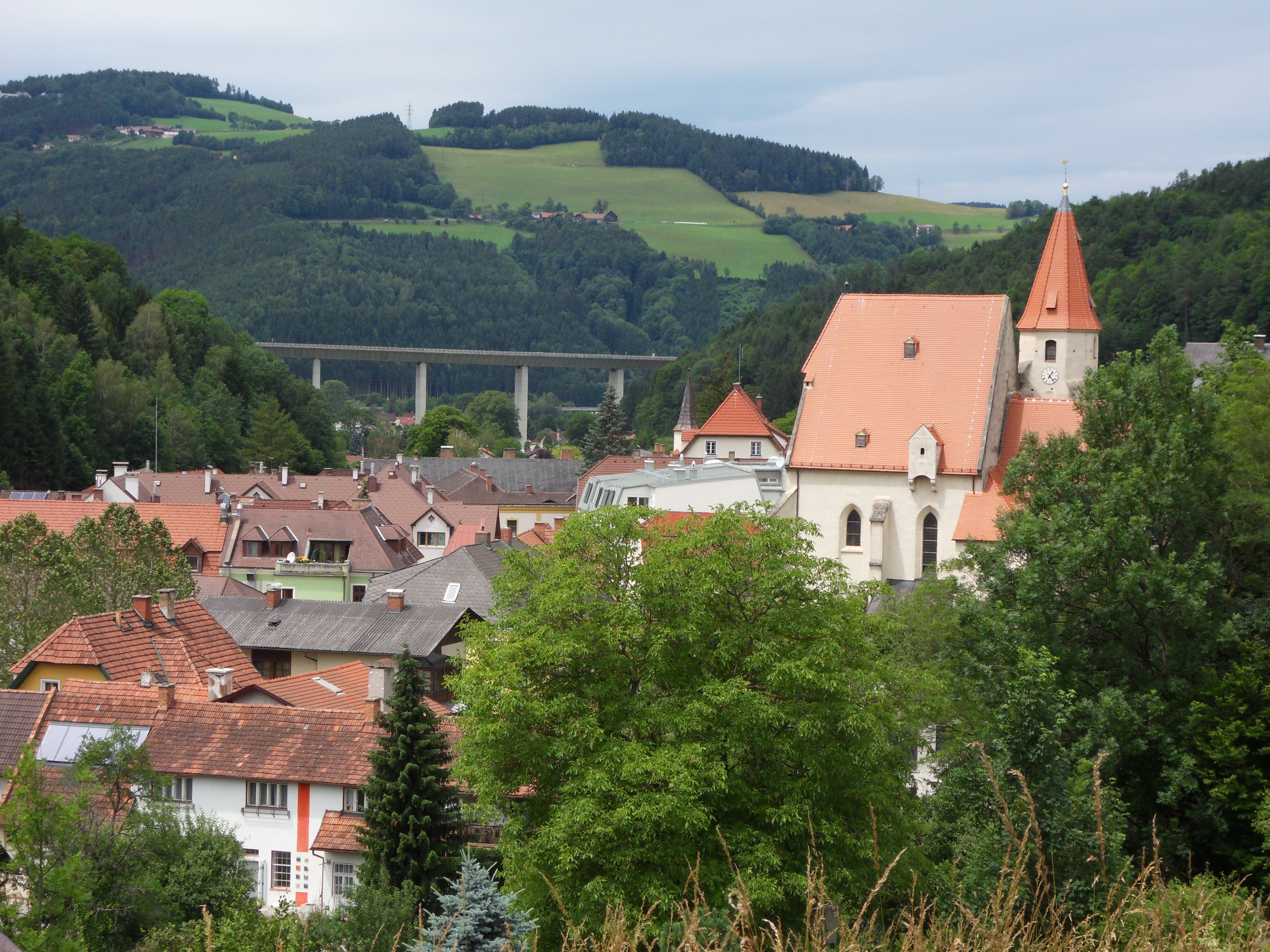
- Edlitz

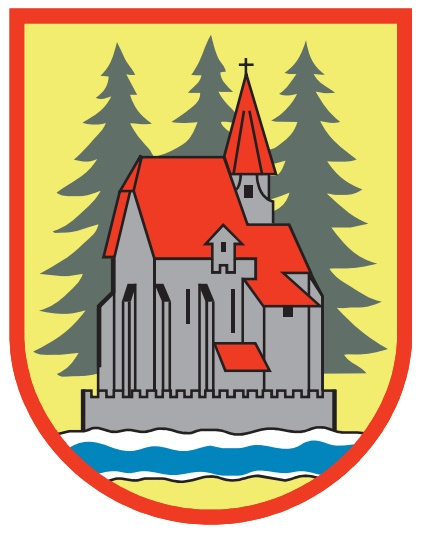
- Coat of arms

- Location within Austria Edlitz (Lower Austria)
- Coordinates: 47°35′N 16°8′E
- Country: Austria
- State: Lower Austria
- District: Neunkirchen

Government
  - Mayor: Thomas Ernst (ÖVP)

Area
  - Total: 14.25 km^{2} (5.50 sq mi)
- Elevation: 454 m (1,490 ft)

Population (2018-01-01)
  - Total: 906
- Time zone: UTC+1 (CET)
  - Summer (DST): UTC+2 (CEST)
- Postal code: 2842
- Area code: 02644
- Vehicle registration: NK
- Website: www.edlitz.at

Edlitz is a Market town in the district of Neunkirchen in the Austrian state of Lower Austria.

== Geography ==
Edlitz is located in Bucklige Welt in the industrial district near Aspang-Markt. The area of the market town covers 14.23 square kilometers. Exactly 50 percent of the area is forested.

== Congregational Structure ==
The community forms the cadastral community Edlitz. This consists of Edlitz-Markt and the districts of Baumgart, Ebenhof, Grimmenstein, Grub, Handler, Hofstatt, Hofstetten, Kamerallen, Kohlreuth, Prägart, Pumperwaldl, Rauchlehen, Schafferhof, Schauerberg, Schneeweißhof, Sonnberg, Wieden and Winterhof.

== History ==
=== Antiquity and the Middle Ages ===
The area used to be part of the Roman province of Noricum.

Due to the abundance of water in the Pittental and the associated frequent flooding, the first settlements in this area were difficult to access in the elevated side valleys. A find of Roman coins suggests that the transition area from the Edlitztal to the Pittental was already inhabited in Roman times. From the Middle Ages, the history of the place is very closely linked to the development of the church and the parish.

The parish seat "de Edelz" was first mentioned in 1192 CE, when it was separated from the mother parish of Bromberg and an independent parish was set up.

=== Late Medieval Ages and Early Modern Era (Incursions by Hungarians, Turks and Kurucs) ===
In the following centuries, Edlitz was hit by numerous Hungarian and later Turkish invasions. Several epidemics occurred. In the year 1349 CE, a separate plague cemetery had to be built for the many dead.

In 1529 CE, Edlitz escaped a Turkish attack when the Turks approached the area, but were startled by the midday ringing of the bells and turned back.

In 1590 CE, Edlitz was first referred to as a market town, which then had 14 houses.

In 1608 CE, pastor Georg Hayden was kidnapped by Hungarian forces to Güns and only released after 6 weeks after paying a ransom of 200 guilders. As a thank you, he donated the frescoes in the chancel of the parish church.

There are two more reports of military raids in the Edlitz area, namely in 1620 CE by Hungarians and in 1707 CE by Kurucs (anti-Habsburg insurgents). The fortifications of the church were likely used as a hiding place at this time.

=== Modern period ===
At the end of the 18th century, Edlitz once played an important role in economic and transport life in the Bucklige Welt. A description of the country that was carried out by Emperor Joseph II wrote about the town of Edlitz at the time: "Ein mittelmäßig solid gebauter Markt in einem Graben, hat auch eine solide Kirche, mit Kirchhofmauern umgeben." ("A moderately solidly built market in a ditch also has a solid church surrounded by churchyard walls.") That a place was "solid" at that time referred to the fact it was built of stone.

The town was often hit by flooding from the Edlitzbach. In 1886 CE a person died in the flooding, the creek was secured by a torrent barrier.

== Etymology ==
The etymology is unclear, there are two theories:

- One refers to a Latin deed of donation from 860 CE, in which forty estates, some of which were located in the area of the Bucklige Welt, were donated to the Archbishopric of Salzburg. One of them was "ad ecclesiam Ellodis" ("near the church of Ello"). Ello is a Germanic name that translates as "the noble". This is thought to form the term "de Edelz" would mean "settlement of a nobleman" which became Edlitz.
- A second - more popular theory - says that the name "Edlitz" is derived from the Slavic "jedlica" ("fir stream"), which could be attributed to the wooded area around the place.

== Transport routes and tourism ==
The 19th century brought a significant improvement in traffic conditions, when Count Palffy had the equestrian bridge from Grimmenstein to Edlitz and further on via Thomasberg to Kirchschlag and Güns expanded into a country road in 1815 CE. Today the federal highway runs along this former Palffy-Straße.

In 1881 CE, the opening of the Aspangbahn brought a new era to the Bucklige Welt. Edlitz station was built outside the municipal boundaries because the building site in Grimmenstein, which was then called "Am Treitl", was cheaper. Today Edlitz-Grimmenstein station is in the municipality of Thomasberg.

The opening of the railway connection also meant the start of tourism in Edlitz. Primarily guests from Vienna liked to come to the Bucklige Welt for summer holidays. According to the Austrian address book in 1938 CE, there was a doctor, two bakers, a butcher, a hairdresser, five innkeepers, five grocers, a glazier, two cellulose factories, a master bricklayer, four millers, a mill construction company and two fruit and vegetable dealers in the market town of Edlitz, two boarding houses, three sawmills, two blacksmiths, three tailors and seven seamstresses, six cobblers, a soda water producer, two tobacconists, three carpenters, a watchmaker, a cattle dealer, a grocer, two wheelwrights, a dental technician, a master carpenter and some farmers are resident.

In 1972 CE there were a total of 32,000 overnight stays in Edlitz. Today, tourism is still an important economic factor for the community, but the number of overnight stays is nowhere near as high. In recent years, the main focus of the municipality has been on improving the infrastructure in the areas of road construction, water supply, canal, kindergarten, fire station and office building.

== Demographics ==
=== Religion ===
Religious of Edlitz
	Roman Catholic	Muslims	Areligious	Protestant	Orthodox
%	92.1	4.3	2.4	0.7	0.2

=== Population ===
Historical population
Year	Pop.	±%
1869	805	—
1880	890	+10.6%
1890	868	−2.5%
1900	768	−11.5%
1910	814	+6.0%
1923	858	+5.4%
1934	968	+12.8%
1939	943	−2.6%
1951	990	+5.0%
1961	1,023	+3.3%
1971	1,037	+1.4%
1981	1,033	−0.4%
1991	1,057	+2.3%
2001	1,057	+0.0%
2011	915	−13.4%
2022	906	−1.0%

== Culture ==
=== Edlitz Parish Church ===
Catholic parish church Edlitz houses a fortified churches in the Bucklige Welt. The origins of the church date back to the second half of the 12th century CE. Almost square in plan with four cross-vaulted bays supported in the middle by a pillar, the nave is the main building element. The bell tower almost disappears behind the high roof of the church. When the nave was rebuilt in 1492 CE, the sacred building was equipped with fortified structures. The fortifications are still there today: cast oriel, loopholes, upper fortification floor in the attic with block chamber, former cistern under the church floor. The last exterior renovation took place in 1978 CE, the interior of the church was last renovated in 1984 CE (interior renovation, exposure of various versions of stone ribs and painting, restoration of the high altar, pulpit, Stations of the Cross and saints) and 2003 CE (redesign of the chancel). In autumn 2005 CE the roof was re-covered. The Edlitz parish church has five bells, the oldest comes from Lazlo Raczko from 1518 CE, another from 1757 CE, all others were purchased in 1948 CE.

The parsonage formed a unit with the fortified churchyard. The oldest surviving part is characterized by a gate that allowed access independently from the churchyard. A small stone tablet set into the wall above the gate bears the year 1463 CE and the name Oswald in Latin letters. Around the church you can still find the remains of the former churchyard defence walls.

=== Economy ===
There were 36 non-agricultural workplaces in 2001, and 55 agricultural and forestry businesses according to the 1999 survey. According to the 2001 census, the number of people in work at the place of residence was 478. The employment rate in 2001 was 48.5 percent.

There are small deposits of lignite on both sides of the road from Edlitz to Krumbach, but these are not worth mining.

=== Education ===
Edlitz is home to a few educational facilities:

1. Lower Austria state kindergarten Edlitz
2. Elementary school
3. Edlitz Middle school
4. Music School Artes Iuventutis

=== Personalities ===
1. Franz Koller, farmer and politician, member of the Austrian National Council and member of the Bundesrat
2. Hermann Schützenhöfer, ÖVP state party chairman and governor of Styria
3. Karl Pichelbauer, provost emeritus of Wiener Neustadt
4. Fjodor Fjodorowitsch Tornau (Theodor von Tornau): The Russian lieutenant general and Baltic baron, who had been military attaché in Vienna for a long time, chose Edlitz as his retirement home and died here on January 4, 1890.
5. Nikolaus Schmidhofer alias Holzknechtseppl (* December 6, 1794; † November 20, 1828 executed in Pinkafeld): The notorious leader of the Stradafüßler gang of robbers is often incorrectly referred to as a native Edlitzer, although he lived in 1794 in Tyrnau near Fronleiten, Vorder Tyrnau. According to tradition, he was later placed with a foster family in Edlitz.

=== Literature ===
Market community Edlitz (ed.): Edlitz – our home community. 2 vols., 1992

== Politics ==
=== Edlitz Council Office Building ===
The municipal council has 15 members.

Edlitz Council
	ÖVP	SPÖ	FPÖ
1990	16	3	2
1995	14	3	2
2000	12	5	2
2005	5		2
2010	15	4	
2015	15	4	
2020	13	2	

=== Mayors ===
1850–1865	Georg Rodax, Wirtschaftsbesitzer
1865–1868	Leopold Posch, Kürschnermeister
1868–1871	Mathias Piribauer, Wirtschaftsbesitzer
1871–1875	Leopold Bernsteiner, Wirtschaftsbesitzer
1875–1877	Carl Handler, Wirtschaftsbesitzer
1877–1892	Josef Punkl, Wirtschaftsbesitzer
1892–1898	Sebastian Heißenberger, Hausbesitzer und Gastwirt
1898–1911	Anton Kitir, Gastwirt
1911–1917	Adalbert Lederer, Kaufmann
1917–1920	Karl Ernst, Bäckermeister
1920–1921	Anton Herzog, Wirtschaftsbesitzer
1921–1922	Johann Schwarz, Wirtschaftsbesitzer
1922–1926	Karl Piribauer, Wirtschaftsbesitzer
1926–1938	Johann Schwarz, Wirtschaftsbesitzer
1938–1945	Franz Chaloupka, Dentist
1945–1946	Johann Schwarz, Landwirt
1946–1965	Karl Seidl, Zimmerermeister
1965–1980	Johann Korntheuer, Schneidermeister
1980–1993	Josef Ernst, Bäckermeister
1993–1994	Franz Kampichler, kfm. Angestellter
01/1995–03/1995	Karl Gradwohl, Landwirt
1995–2002	Franz Kampichler, kfm. Angestellter
2002–	Manfred Schuh, Gemeindebediensteter
