= Friedrichswerder Church =

Neo-Gothic church in Berlin

- Friedrichswerdersche Kirche
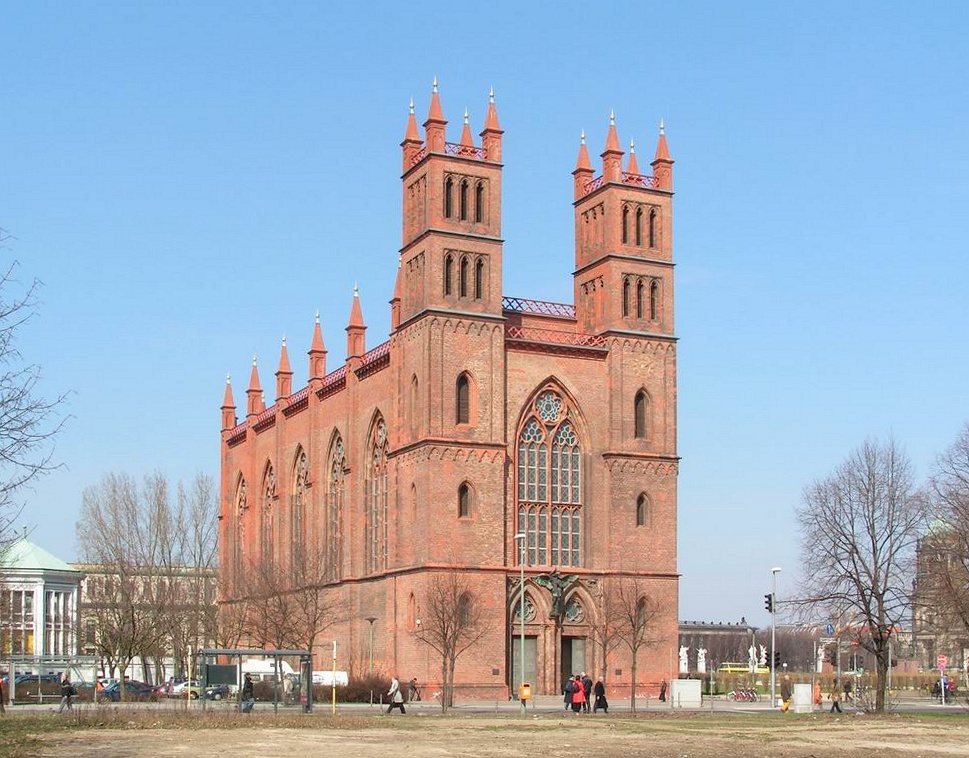
- View from southwest to the façade towards Werderscher Markt

Religion
- Affiliation: Profaned since its reconstruction in 1987; 1701-1820s a triple simultaneum of a Huguenot Calvinist, a German Reformed and a German Lutheran congregation, 1820s–1872 Calvinist and united Protestant double simultaneum, 1872–1944 united Protestant (Prussian Union)
- District: last: March of Brandenburg ecclesiastical province, Kirchenkreis Berlin Stadt I (deanery)
- Province: last: Evangelical Church of the old-Prussian Union
- Ecclesiastical or organizational status: Church (former); Museum (current)

Location
- Location: Mitte, a locality of Berlin
- Interactive map of Friedrichswerder Church
- Coordinates: 52°30′57″N 13°23′51″E

Architecture
- Architects: Jean de Bodt (1st bldg 1699–1701), Karl Friedrich Schinkel (new construction 1824–31), Abri (reconstruction 1982–87), Abri & Rabe (renovation 1996–2001)
- Completed: 16 May 1701 (inauguration in French), 12 July 1701 (inauguration in German), reconstruction 1987
- Materials: brick

Friedrichswerder Church (German: Friedrichswerdersche Kirche, French: Temple du Werder) was the first Neo-Gothic church built in Berlin, Germany. It was designed by an architect better known for his Neoclassical architecture, Karl Friedrich Schinkel, and was built under his direction from 1824 to 1831.

The building is maintained by the Prussian Cultural Heritage Foundation and is part of the Berlin State Museums' ensemble. In late 2012, the building was closed due to structural damage caused by nearby construction. After extensive restoration work completed in early October 2019, the damage was repaired and exhibitions from the Alte Nationalgalerie (the Old National Gallery) returned. These include a collection of nineteenth-century German sculptures, showing works of Johann Gottfried Schadow, Karl Friedrich Schinkel and Christian Daniel Rauch, among others. On the upper floor is an exhibition of the work and life of Karl Friedrich Schinkel.

== Gallery ==
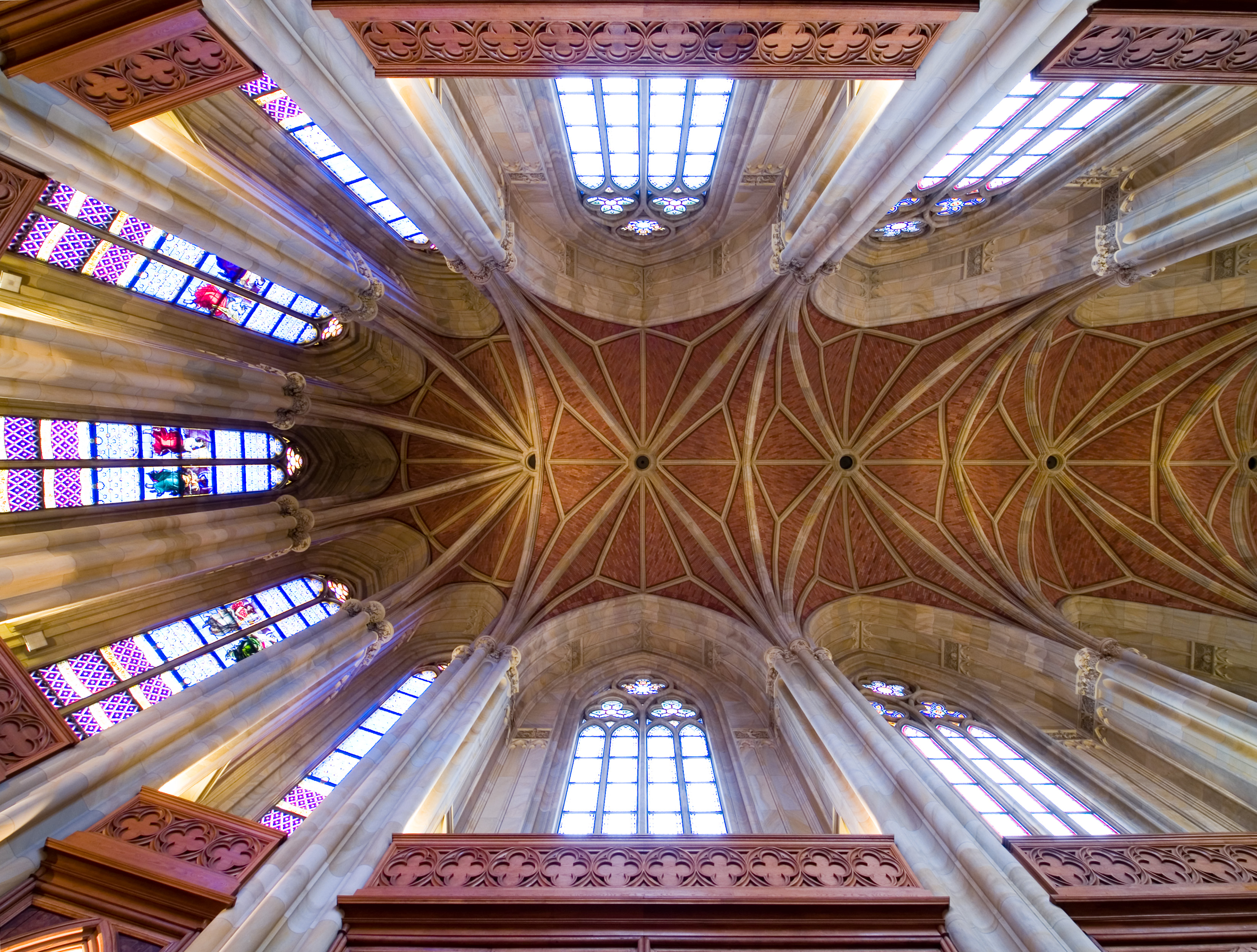
The vaulting system

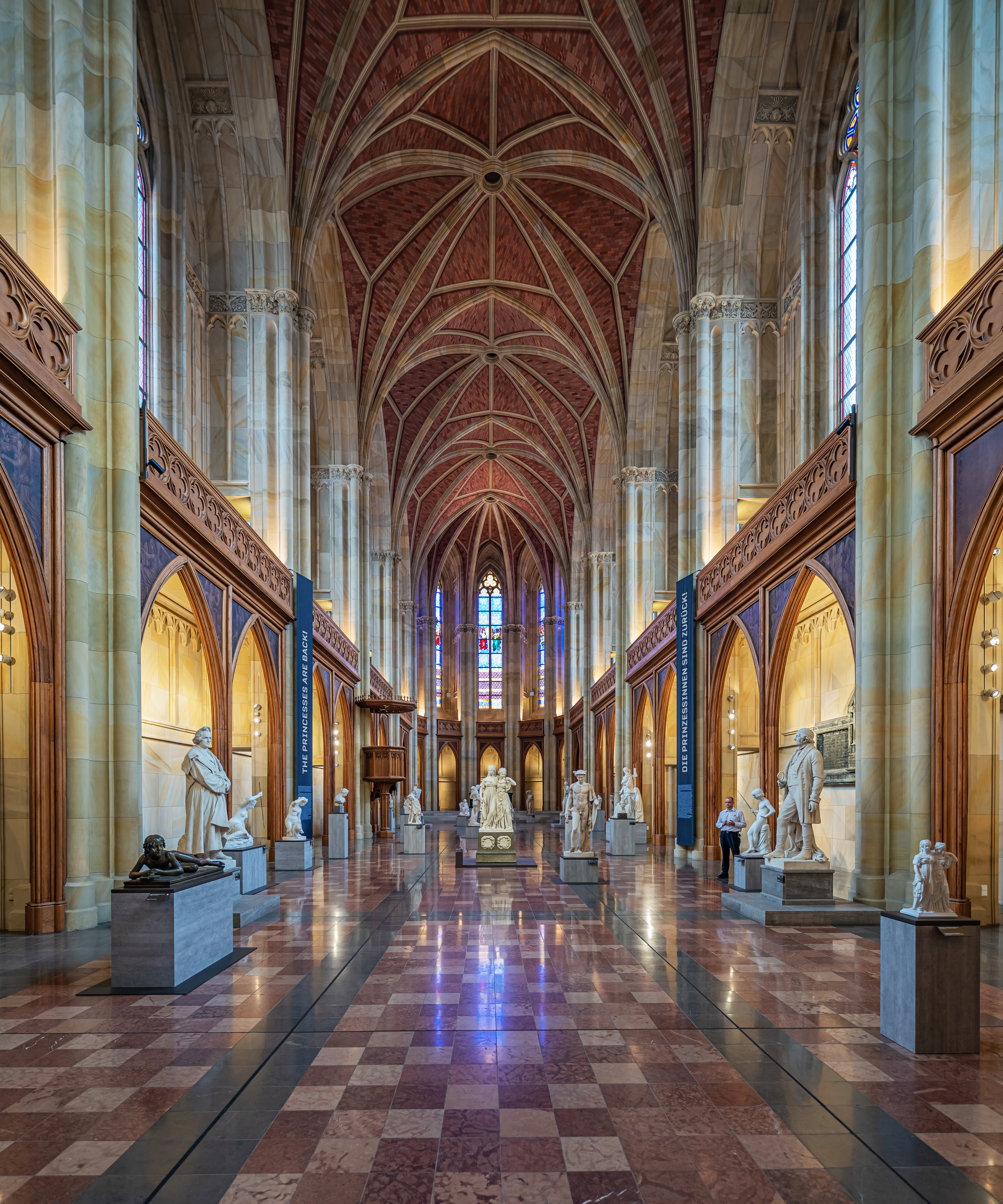
Interior view with sculpture gallery

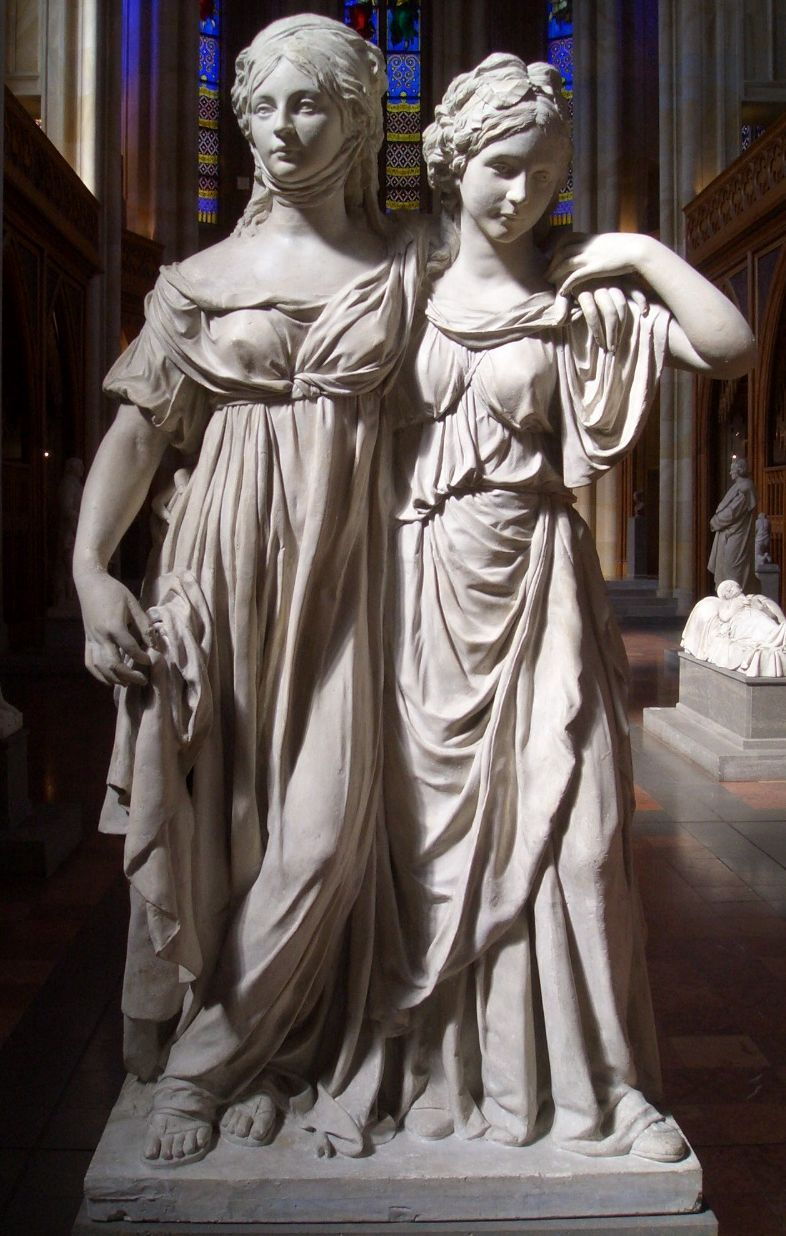
Mecklenburg-Strelitz princesses, sculptures by Schadow

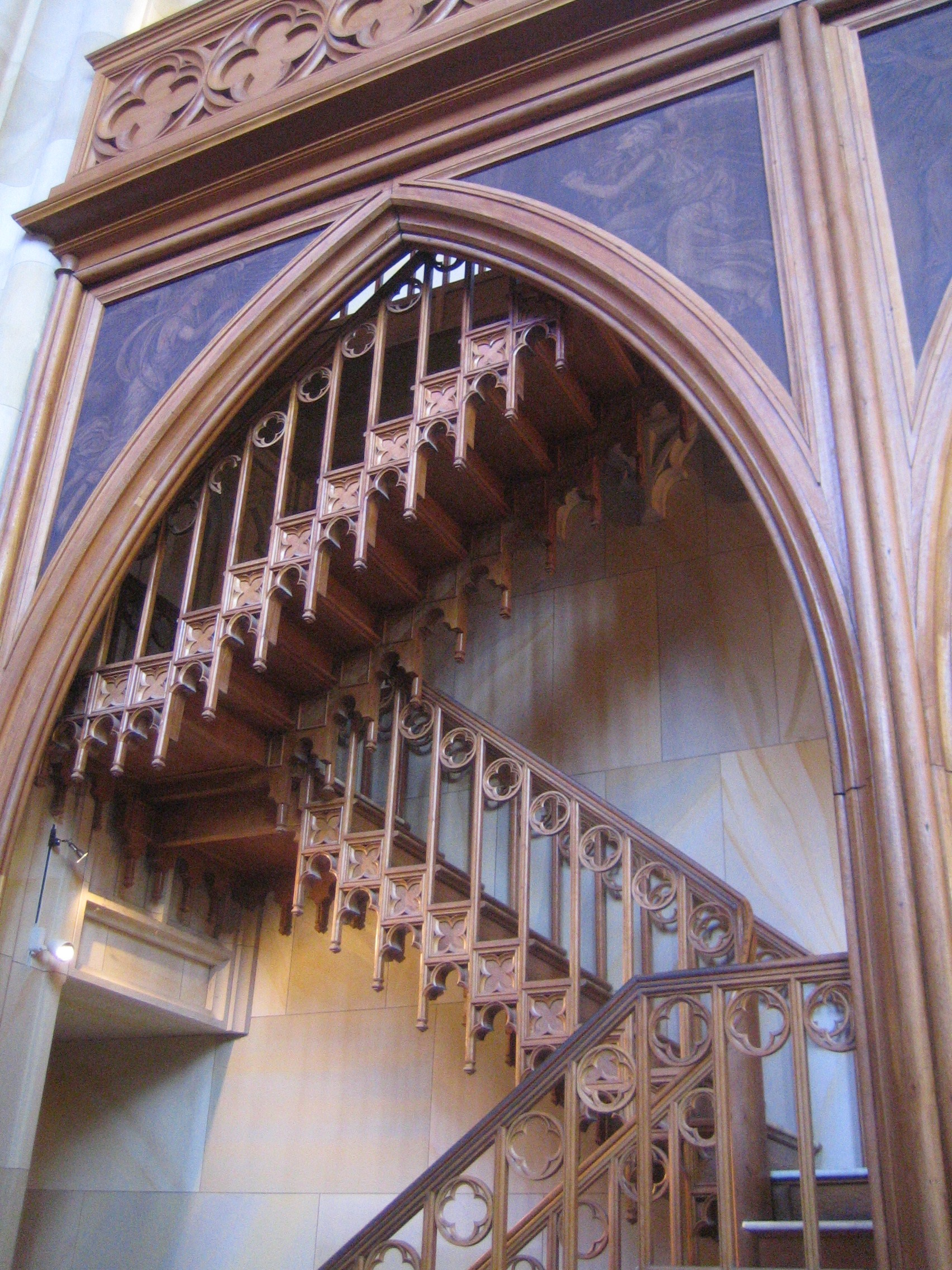
Gallery staircase

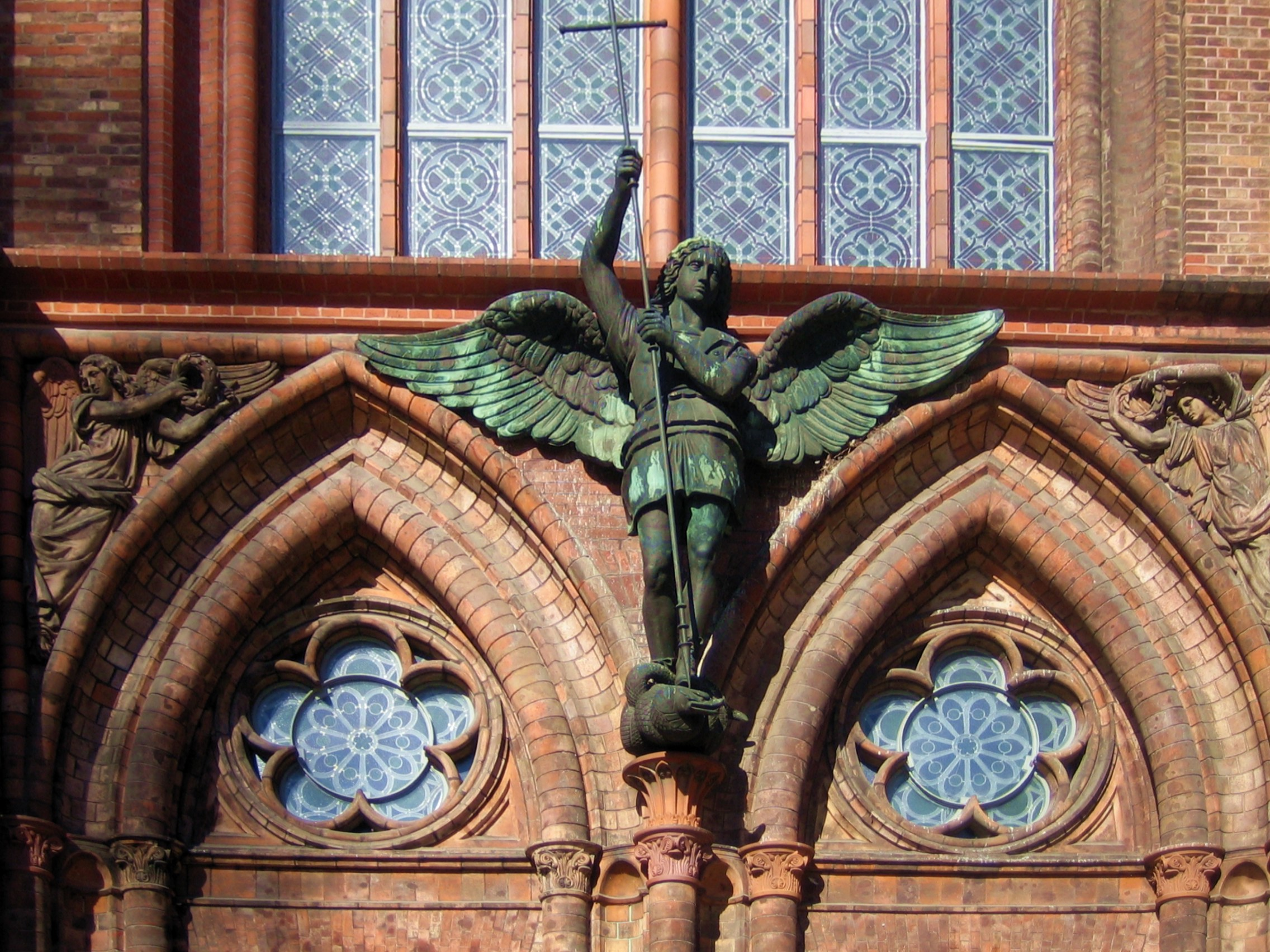
Entrance detail

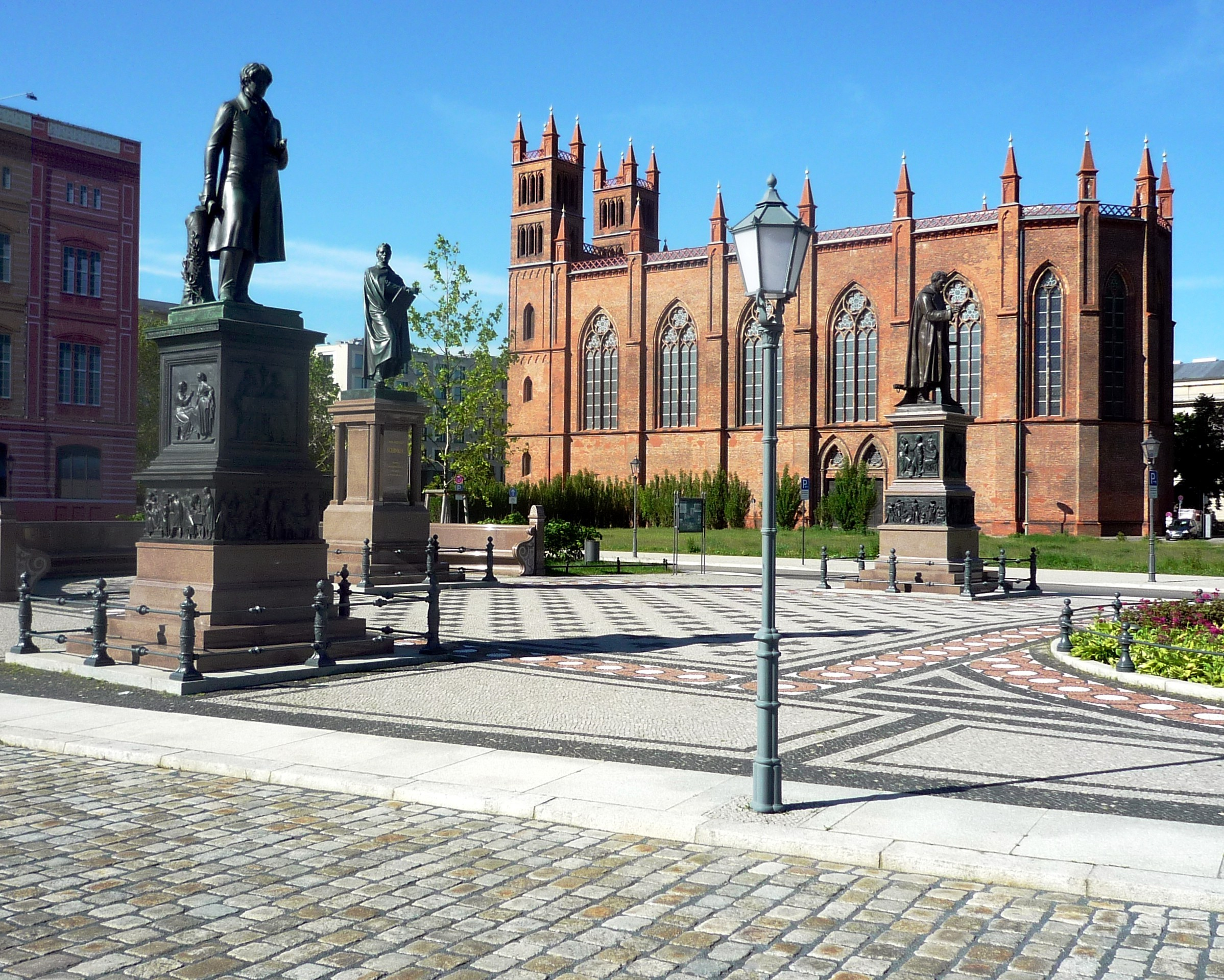
View from reconstructed Schinkelplatz

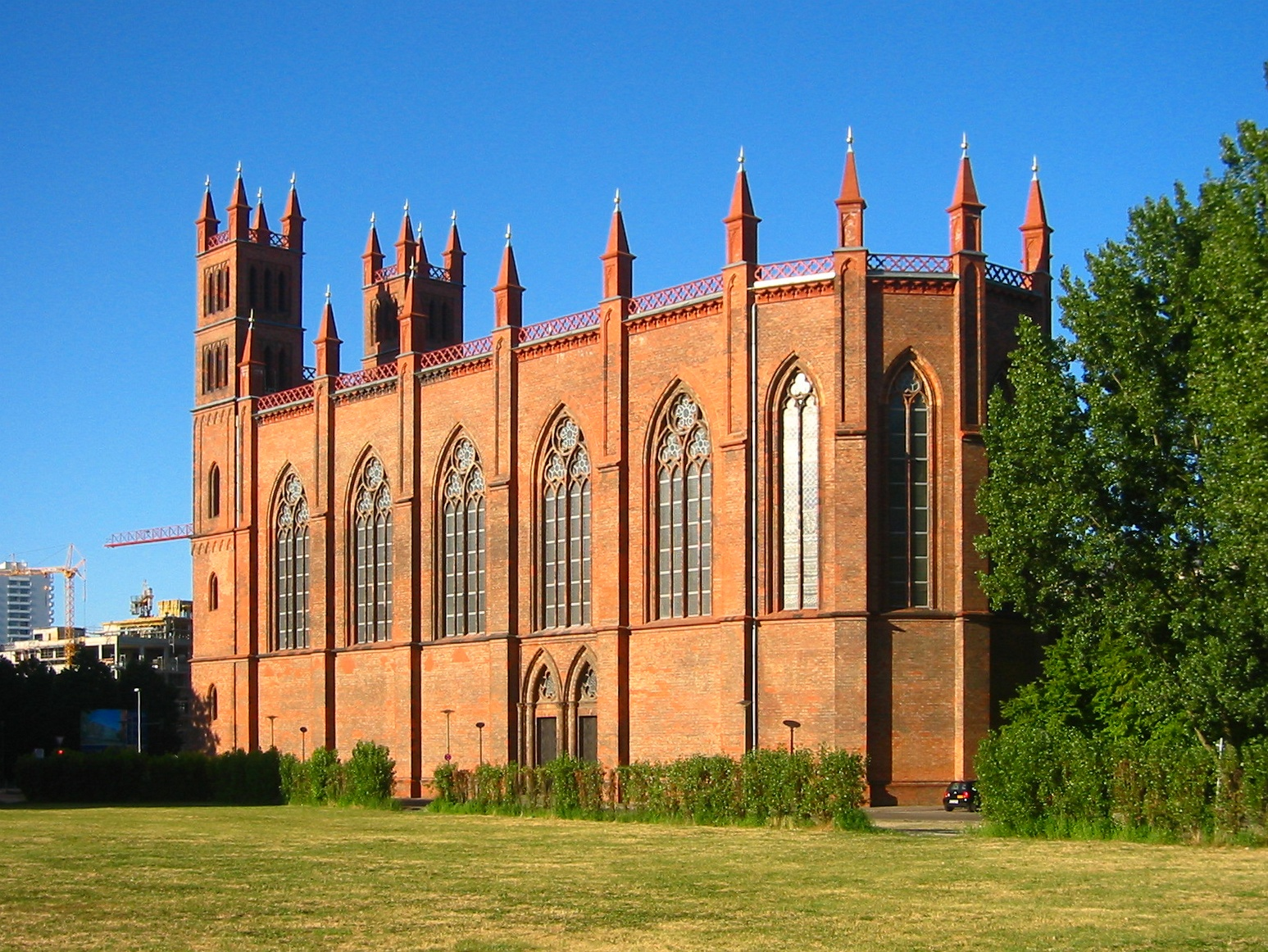
Backside

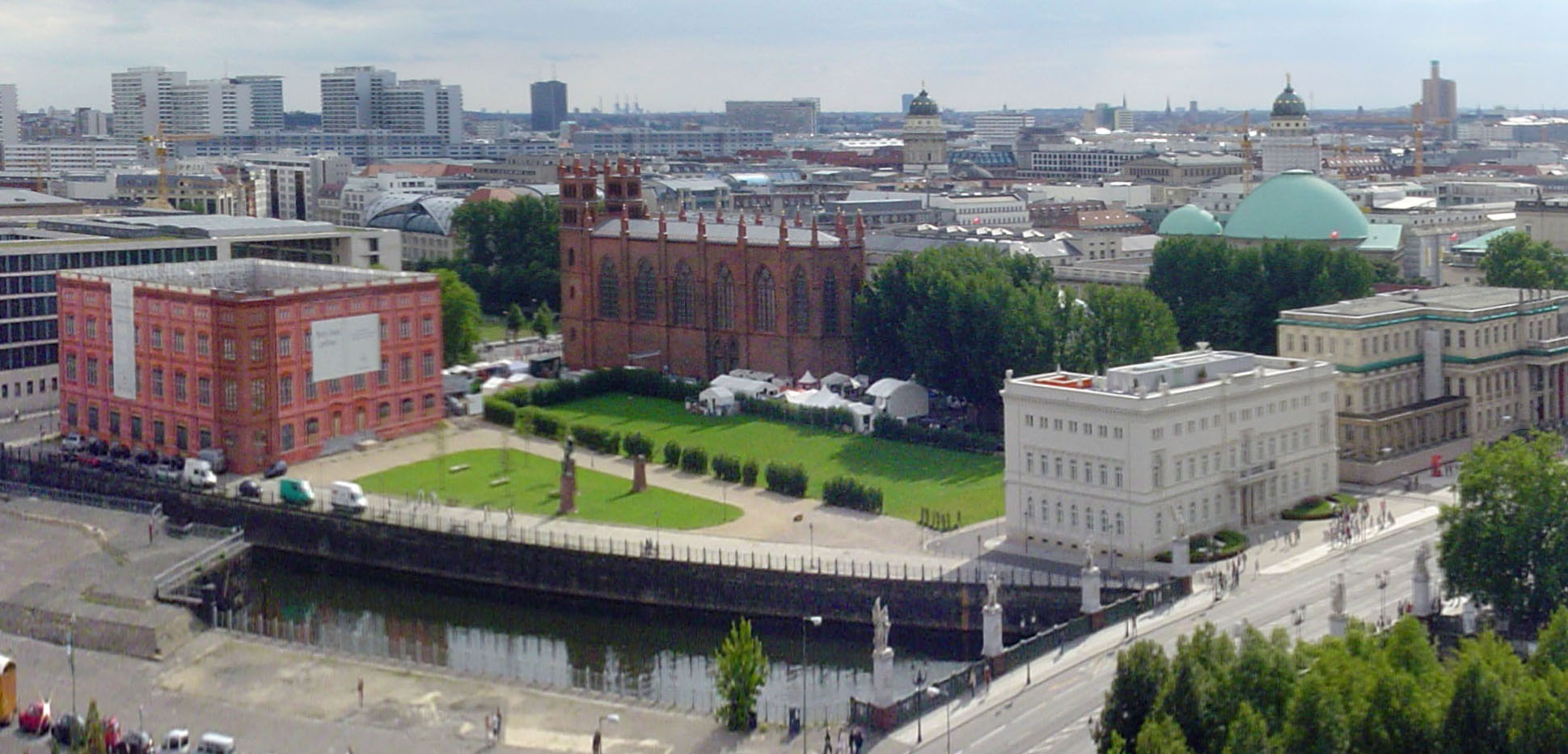
Aerial view

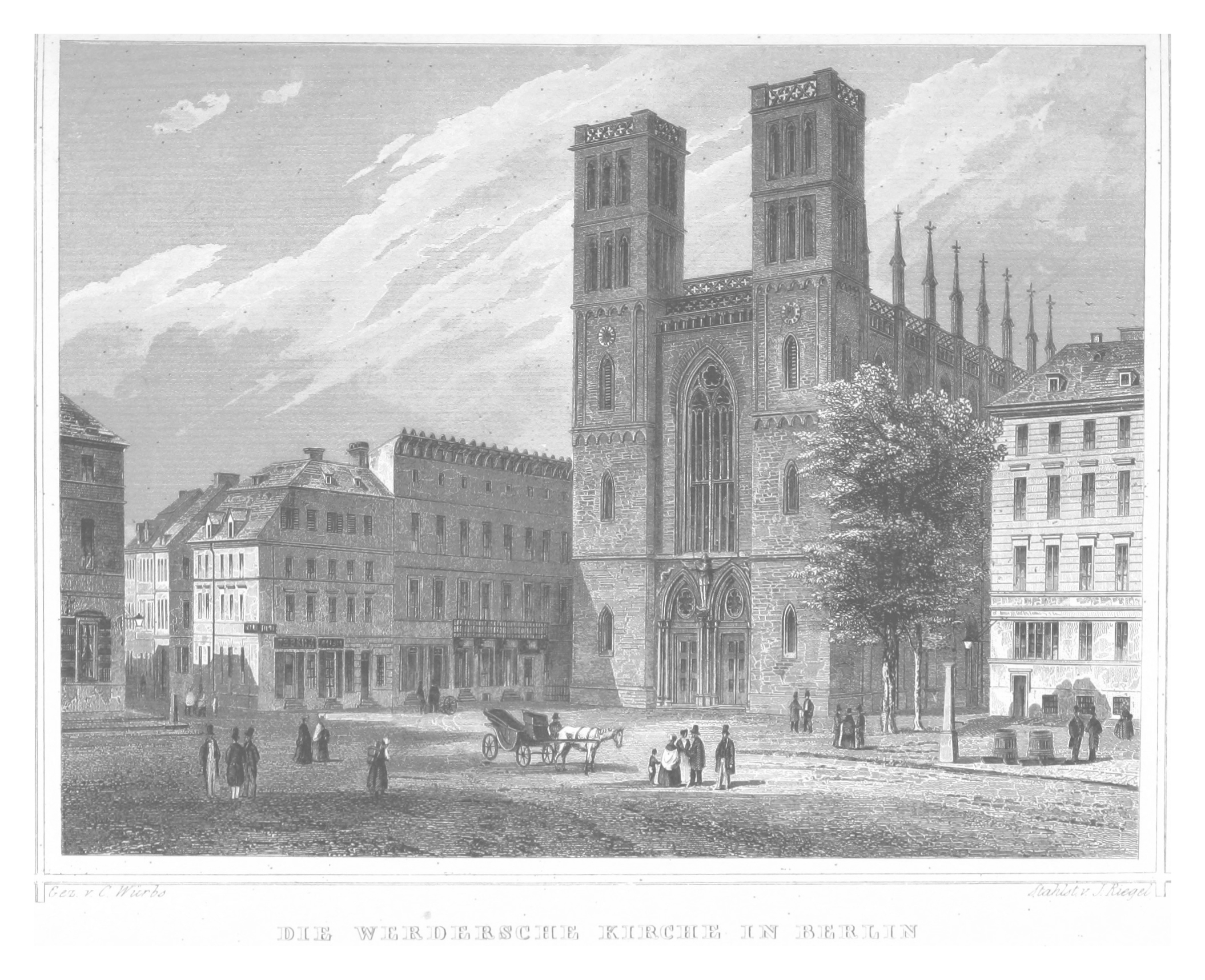
Surroundings in 1852

Panorama from the church top towards Gendarmenmarkt, oil painting by Eduard Gaertner (1834)
