= Carl Rechlin =

German painter (1802–1875)

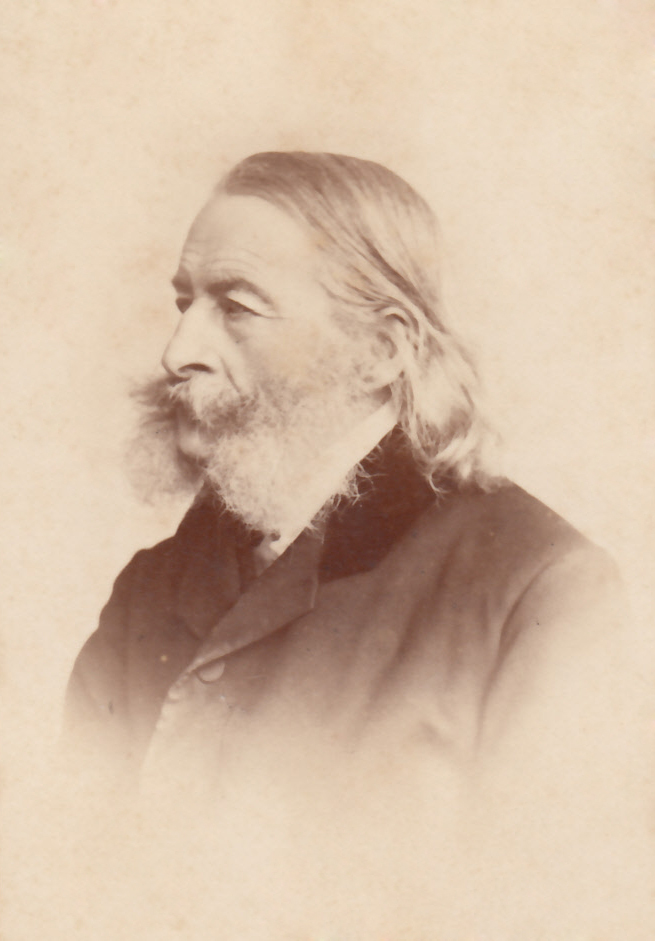
Carl Rechlin

Carl Gustav Rechlin (31 March 1802, in Stralsund – 22 December 1875, in Tempelhof) was a German Classicist painter with emphasis on military and genre themes. A graduate of the Prussian Academy of Arts in Berlin, his paintings were exhibited at the and at the Prussian Academy itself between 1832 and 1860, at the Great Exhibition in London in 1851, and at the Exhibition of the Industry of All Nations in New York City from 1853 to 1854. His works have been subsequently exhibited at the Kronprinzenpalais and at Charlottenburg Palace.

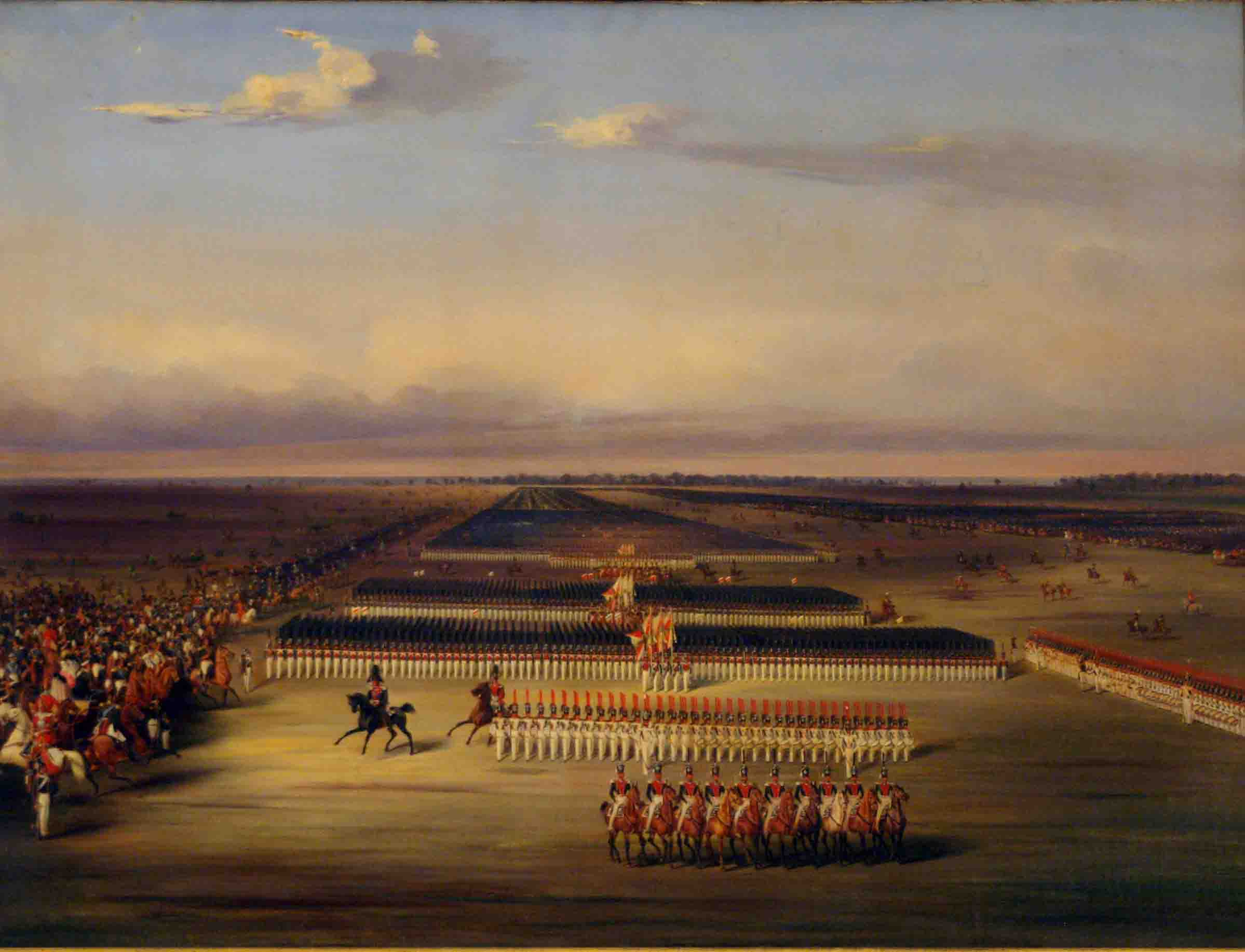
Parade at Kalisz on September 14, 1835

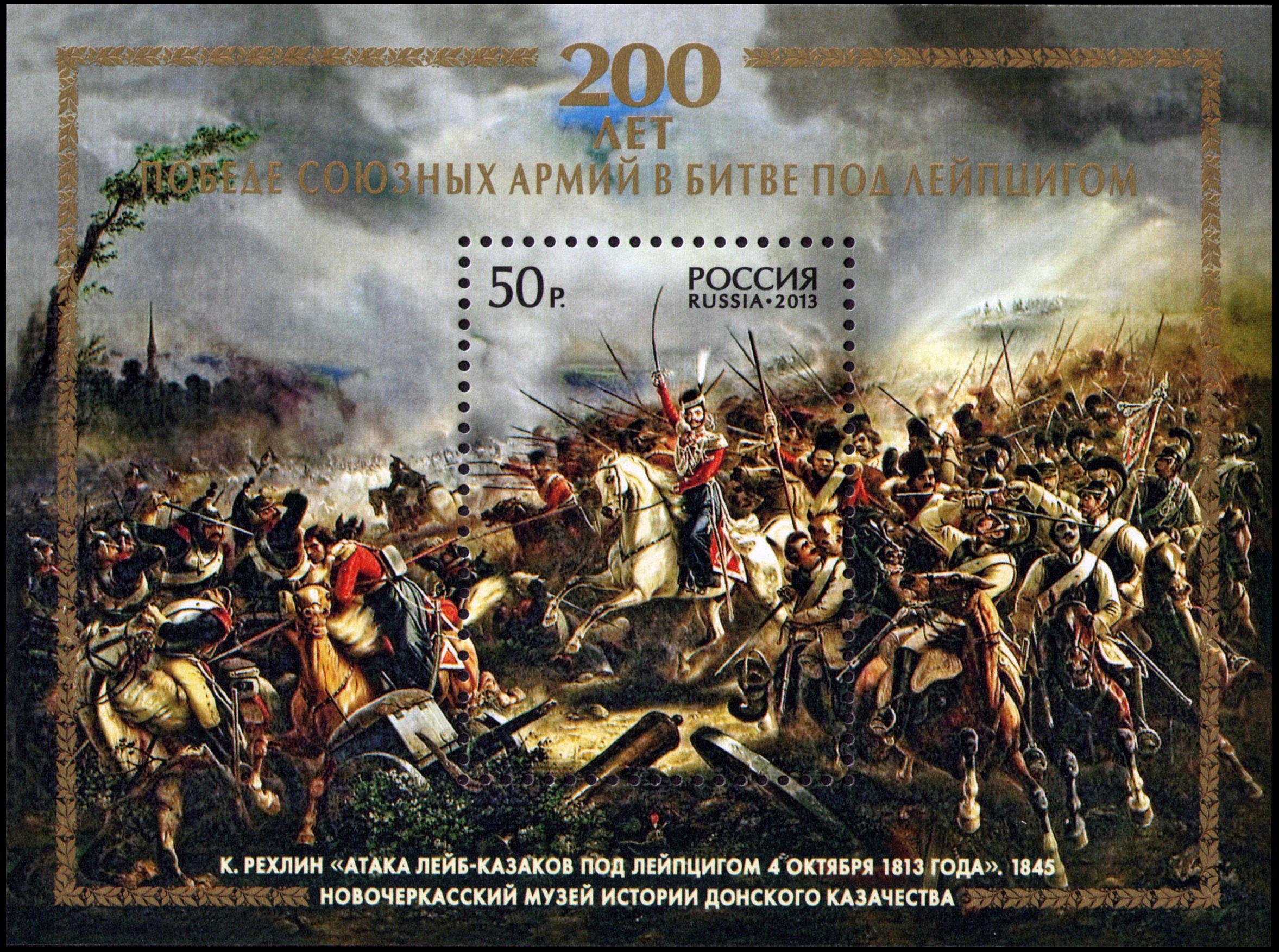
Stamp of Russia 2013 No 1739 Battle of Leipzig
