= Richard Paulick =

German architect

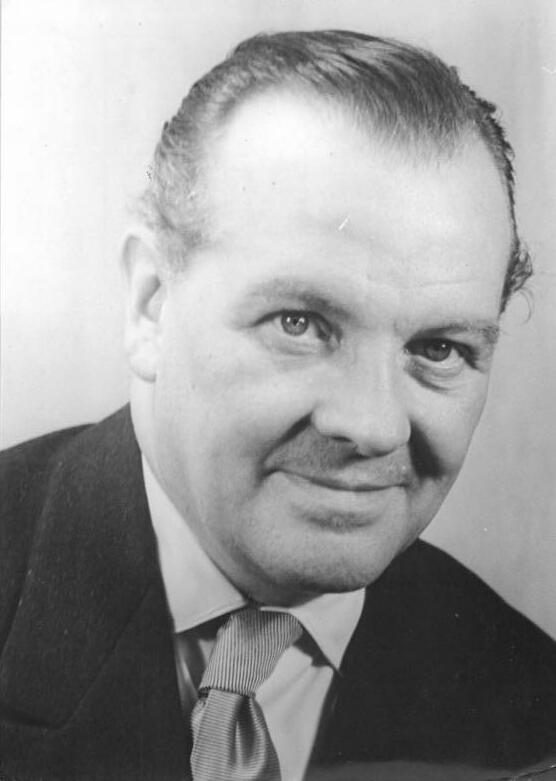
- Richard Paulick in 1956
- Born: 7 November 1903; Roßlau, Duchy of Anhalt, German Empire
- Died: 4 March 1979 (aged 75); East Berlin, German Democratic Republic (East Germany)
- Education: TU Dresden; TU Berlin
- Occupations: Architect; City Planner
- Political party: SPD; SAP; SED
- Spouse(s): Else Bongers (1907-1993); Thea Hess; Gemma Constanze Geim (1916–1993)
- Parents: Richard Paulick (1876-1952) (father); Helene Herrlinger (mother)

Richard Paulick (7 November 1903 – 4 March 1979) was a German architect with political connections. He enjoyed a productive period in the Shanghai International Settlement between 1933 and 1949. He has been described as the "father of East-German Plattenbau", almost invariably grey unpainted and uncladded apartment blocks, using large standardised concrete slabs prefabricated off-site. The construction techniques used for large-scale low-cost residential developments on the edge of East German cities during the 1950s, 1960s and 1970s were widely used elsewhere in Europe, not least to expand or to "redevelop" cities in England, Scotland and West Germany during the 1960s and 1970s.

Paulick had a significant public profile in the German Democratic Republic (GDR) and his postulation was implemented in the new towns of Hoyerswerda, Schwedt, and Halle-Neustadt. In the eyes of admirers, Paulick was able to bring an element of "humanisation" to the economics-driven, low-cost, high-density, post-war reconstruction of East Germany.

== Life ==
=== Provenance and early years ===
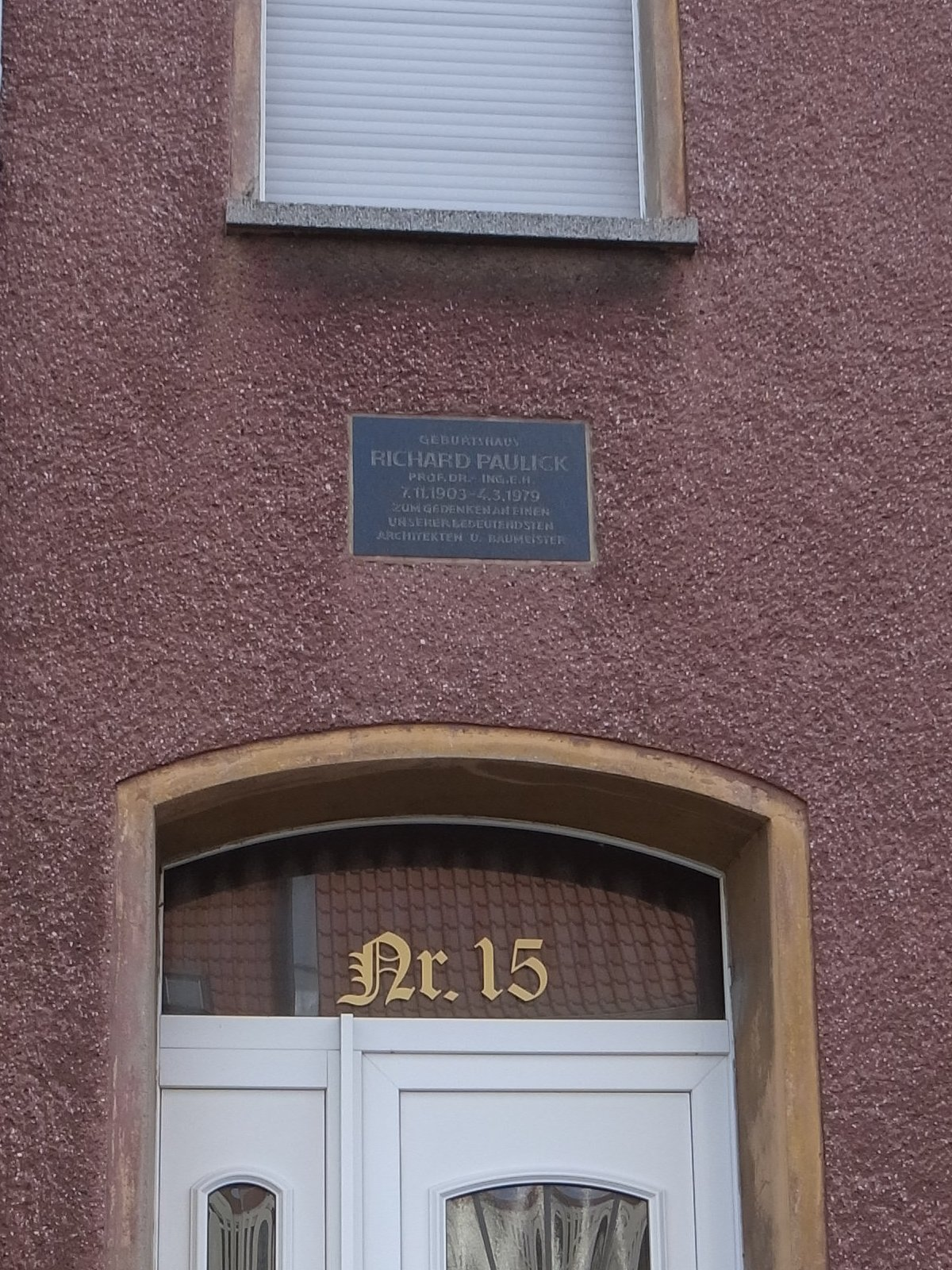
The house at Roßlau in which Richard Paulick was born in 1903

Richard Paulick was born in Roßlau, a small manufacturing town near Dessau some 40 km / 25 miles north of Leipzig. His father, also named Richard Paulick (1876-1952), was a trades unionist employed, as a young man, at the Royal Porcelain Factory in Berlin. His father wrote for the Anhalter Volksblatt, a local newspaper, and later became increasingly engaged as a local politician in the Free State of Anhalt (Free State of Anhalt). He had a younger brother, Rudolf Paulick, born in 1908, who would also become an architect.

Between 1910 and 1923 Paulick attended the "Fridericianum", a primary and secondary school in Dessau. After successfully having completed the necessary examinations, he was ready for university, where he was keen to study art history. He was persuaded by his father to study architecture, however. With this in mind, he enrolled at the Technische Hochschule Dresden, where the architecture teaching was under the powerful influence of Hans Poelzig, who taught there. Paulick later switched to the Technische Universität Berlin, where he was taught by Martin Dülfer and Oswin Hempel.

=== Student years and Walter Gropius ===
During his student years, he became well networked with several of the more innovative members of Germany's architectural establishment. In 1925, when the Bauhaus School relocated to Dessau, Richard Paulick took a job with them, employed—according to one source—as a "city guide" for the "Bauhaus masters" of the city in which he had spent his school years. During this time, he developed close friendships and professional alliances with, in particular, Marcel Breuer and Georg Muche, with whom he co-designed the pioneering Steel House ("Stahlhaus") built in Dessau during 1926/27. Six months after starting work at Bauhaus Dessau, he enrolled again at the Technische Hochschule Berlin, where he studied between August 1925 and June 1927, now accepted into the "master class" of Hans Poelzig. He undertook his studies at Berlin in parallel with his continuing work with Bauhaus Dessau. Directly after having completed his course at Berlin, he was rehired, now joining the team in the private architecture studio of Walter Gropius himself. Projects on which he worked included a second, greatly expanded phase for the Törten Steel House development, which now became a residential housing estate rather than a single "building". He was also assigned to work on an implausibly large building (subsequently repurposed) for a new employment office in Dessau (Arbeitsamt). During 1928, Gropius had to leave Dessau under circumstances which seem to have involved a certain level of fractious politics both inside and outside the Dessau office. At this stage, Paulick remained at Dessau, taking responsibility for managing the office and for overseeing the completion of jobs which Gropius had hitherto been directing. In June 1929, Paulick followed Gropius to Berlin which by this point, for most purposes, was replacing Dessau as the headquarters for the Bauhaus movement in Germany.

The Great Depression after the Wall Street crash hit Germany when major bank collapses and unemployment levels reaching record levels. There was very little work in the pipeline for architects. In 1930 Gropius found himself obliged by the dire economic situation to release Paulick from his employment. Paulick set up his own architecture practice in Berlin which continued to exist for three years, active both in Berlin and in Dessau. A small number of projects was undertaken and completed, but in the context of the continuing economic problems that the country was experiencing, commercial success eluded him during this period.

=== Political involvement ===
The enforced shortage of professional work during the early 1930s evidently left Paulick with more spare time for political involvement, but he had already been involved, while still a child, in his father's political activity in Rosslau, and had joined the Social Democratic Party (Sozialdemokratische Partei Deutschlands / SPD) in his early 20s, back in 1925 (or 1927: sources differ.) Under the acute social pressure following military defeat and economic collapse, politics became increasingly polarised during the 1920s, with more voters favouring the Communists or Hitler's National Socialists rather than the parties of political moderation. By 1930 the political polarisation was spilling onto the streets and threatening to deadlock the parliament – which was precisely what happened in 1932. In 1930, Paulick switched his political allegiance, becoming a founder member of the short-lived Socialist Workers' Party (Sozialistische Arbeiterpartei Deutschlands / SAP), committed to promoting political co-operation between the Communist Party and the centre-left SPD in order to avert the risk of a take-over by extremists from the right. By 1933, Paulick was identified as an SAP party official, although the nature and extent of his political activism are hard to pin down. It was during 1933 that the Hitler government took power, Machtergreifung and Germany was transformed from a democracy to a one-party dictatorship. The SAP, along with other political parties, was outlawed. Paulick's record of non-Hitlerite political activism and the continuing inactivity in the German construction sector both pointed towards the potential advantages of emigration.

=== Shanghai: exile and opportunities ===
In the summer of 1933, Paulick received and accepted what amounted to a job offer from his friend, former flatmate and Dresden student contemporary, Rudolf Hamburger. This involved relocating to Shanghai, which during the 1930s experienced a remarkable and sustained building boom. In contrast to the situation in Europe, in Shanghai, where he arrived in June 1933, there was an abundance of work for architects. His wife Else Bongers did not accompany him, however, and the marriage later ended through divorce. Between 1933 and 1937, Paulick worked as an interiors architect for Hamburger's newly formed company, "The Modern Homes" (renamed in 1934 "Modern Home"), which in a very short time had already accumulated a massive contracts backlog. When, or shortly after, Richard Paulick had emigrated to Shanghai in 1933, he had been accompanied or followed by his younger brother, Rudolf Paulick. In 1937 the brothers set up their own business, still in Shanghai, the "Modern Homes Company". The company was reported to be capable and keen to design "everything from the skyscraper to the foot-stool". Business flourished. In 1943 the company was rebranded as "Paulick & Paulick Architects", concentrating as before on interior architecture and design. Walter Gropius had by this time emigrated to the United States, and it was on the recommendation of Gropius that in 1940 or 1942 Paulick was offered and accepted a professorship at the American Missionary University of St.John's in Shanghai.

Deprived of German citizenship in 1938, Paulick was officially a stateless person between 1938 and 1950. This does not seem to have been a significant disadvantage to him while he worked in Shanghai International Settlement. By 1945 Paulick had also established his reputation in connection with urban planning, and in 1945 he took charge of the Shanghai city planning department. In 1946 he accepted a complementary role as buildings advisor to the All-China railway operator.

=== German Democratic Republic (GDR) ===
In 1949, Richard Paulick reacted to the events surrounding the proclamation of the People's Republic of China by fleeing back to Europe where six years of war had given way to an armed frosty peace across a divided continent. Dessau and the surrounding region, to which he now returned, had been administered since 1945 as the Soviet occupation zone, relaunched and rebranded in October 1949 as the Soviet sponsored German Democratic Republic (East Germany), the country in which, drawn in the first instance by the opportunities arising through his connections to Hans Scharoun, at this time still based in (East) Berlin. Sharoun moved to West Germany shortly afterwards, but Richard Paulick stayed on. In East Germany, he relaunched his career and then greatly enlarged his international professional reputation in and beyond Europe between 1950 and 1979.

=== Leadership roles and significant influence ===
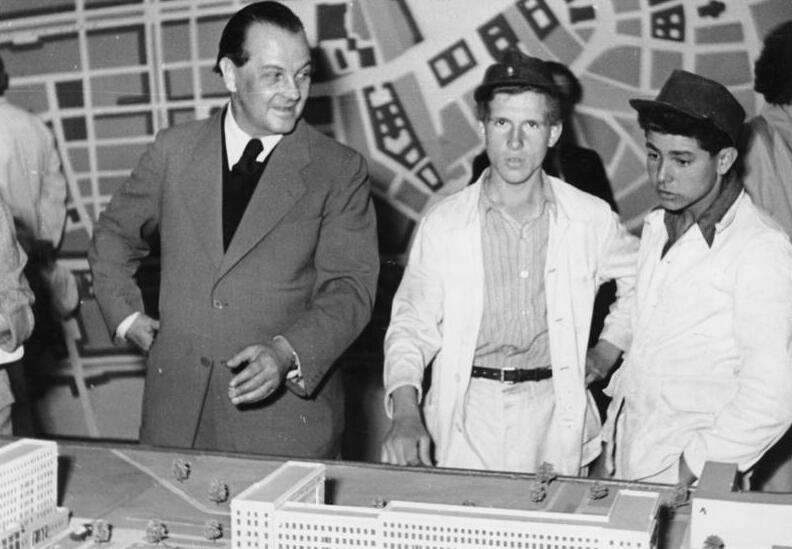
Exhibition of the Bauakademie, the East German Building Academy 1952

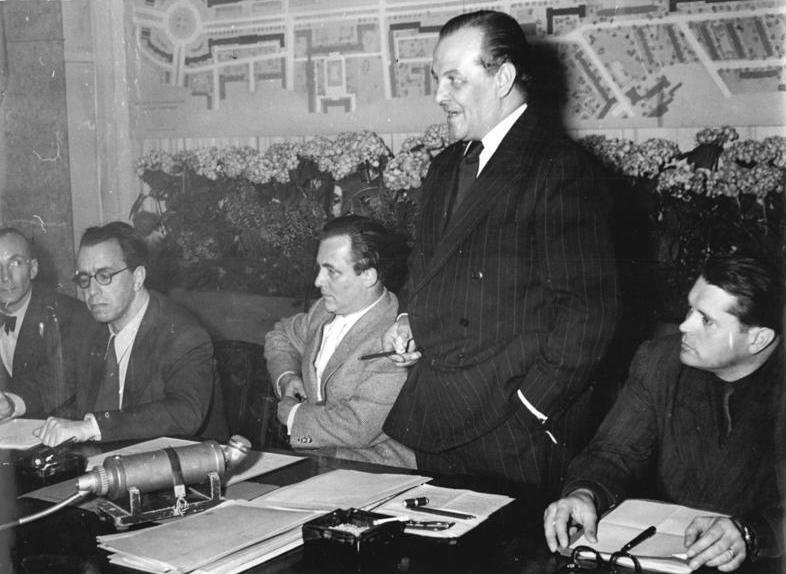
Press conference for the construction of the Karl-Marx-Allee 1952

In 1950 he was appointed department head at the Institute for Building and Civil Engineering at the (East) German Academy of Sciences and Humanities. When the institute was expanded and reconfigured in 1951 as the East German Building Academy ("Bauakademie der DDR") he acquired a number of additional departmental leadership responsibilities and taking charge jointly, alongside Hermann Henselmann and Hanns Hopp, of a prestigious Meisterwerkstatt (literally, master workshop), indicating official approval, and creating opportunities to exercise a major influence over the East German built environment through a sustained period of far-reaching post-war reconstruction.

Paulick was a leading participant in the architecture competition to rebuild what was known at the time as the Stalin-Allee (in 1961 renamed into Karl-Marx-Allee). The redevelopment was widely seen as a flagship project for the East German capital, and it would become a benchmark for other projects – generally on a smaller - scale throughout the country. Paulick's contribution was accepted for development as "Sector C", a prominent part of the overall Stalin-Allee development. Having produced a winning design, he enjoyed responsibility for its implementation. Despite the overall scale of the work, his characteristic attention to detail was evident in the care he took in designing the unusual four-armed street lights, which subsequently became celebrated (or, half a century later after fashions had changed), not infrequently derided as the Paulick-Kandelaber ("Paulick Candelabras" or "Paulick Lights") along with their two-armed derivatives. As part of the "Sector C", project he included a 126 m^{2} penthouse flat which he subsequently occupied, and which a more recent tenant, his granddaughter, have struggled to preserve in its well-judged original condition, in opposition to pressures for improvements drawing on more recent structural precepts.

A larger and more contentious element in Paulick's "Sector C" plan was his 1951 design for a vast high-rise government office block surrounded by a great square, with a combined 30,000 m^{2} foot-print, reminiscent of the super-human Stalinist structures appearing in Moscow and Warsaw and in other central European capitals at the time, to be built on what later became the Marx-Engels Forum. One reason for the opposition the project attracted was that it involved tearing down the Hohenzollern Palace (subsequently painstakingly rebuilt). Had the development gone ahead, the combined square and office block would have been even larger than the Red Square in Moscow. That could be one reason why Paulick's monster government office block was never built, and after Erich Honecker inherited the party leadership (and thereby leadership of the country) from Walter Ulbricht the site was used for the "Republic Palace" a 1970s design which, in 1990 after German reunification, had proved to be as unloved as Paulick's unbuilt 1950s proposal.

=== Rebuilding Berlin: New towns ===
Through the later 1950s and the 1960s, Paulick played a key role in the rebuilding of the historical central quarters of Berlin. High on the lists of his contributions cited by commentators is his work in the rebuilding of the Berlin State Opera which had been destroyed by war-time bombing, most recently, thoroughly completely on 3 February 1945. He was also involved in the rebuilding of Dresden. He led the Muster- und Experimental-Büro (loosely, "Blueprints and Experimentation Section") at the East German Building Academy in Berlin. His didactic role led to him being talked of as a "professor" in some quarters, and in 1957 he consolidated his position as an insider within the East German political establishment – somewhat belatedly by some criteria – by joining the Socialist Unity Party of Germany.

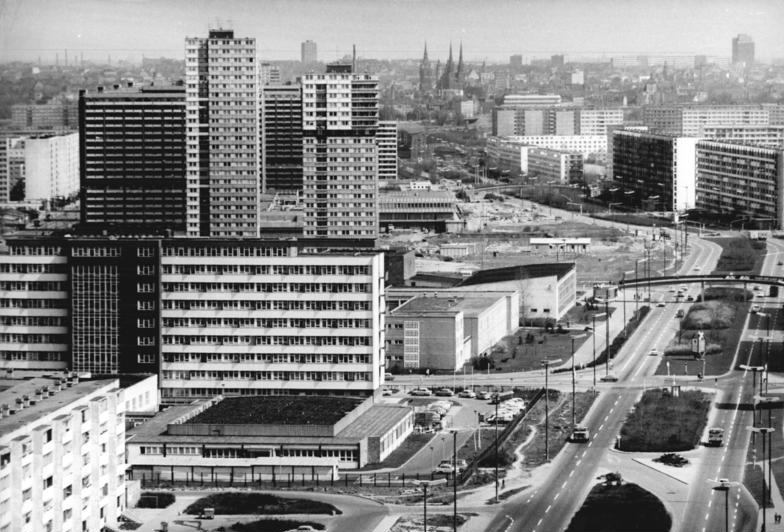
Halle-Neustadt in 1982

This concession to the politicians coincided with his appointment to take charge of a major new town development at Hoyerswerda, much of which had been destroyed by the Russian army in 1945 and where there was an urgent need for extensive and rapid additional residential development to support the expansion of nearby lignite mines. During the later 1950s he was appointed "chief architect" and, in that capacity, given charge of a number of other important new town developments (proudly promoted at the time as "socialist cities") needed to provide accommodation and infrastructure for workers employed in new labour-intensive industries, including those at Schwedt, where the government had decided to create extensive oil refining capacity, and at Halle-Neustadt, which formed the focus of a new chemicals industry.

In 1974 Richard Paulick, now aged 70, retired. Some commentators infer that his retirement was unexpectedly abrupt. He was stripped of all his public offices. Ambitious plans for further developments in Hoyerswerda were never to be fully implemented. Erich Honecker, as head of state, would be celebrated for the remarkable achievement of East Germany's post-war reconstruction until the East German state was terminated in 1989/90. In 1974, with the country's population pressures reduced by the backwash from the slaughter of war and two decades of industrial-scale emigration, alongside the economic noose of impending national bankruptcy, the East German building boom was over. When Richard Paulick died in East Berlin on 4 March 1979, he was already widely forgotten, and his disappearance went largely unreported in the (party controlled) media. More recently, with housing shortages returning towards the top the public agenda, there has been a renewed interest in his achievements and, indeed, in his methods.

== Family ==
Richard Paulick married three times. Through his second and third marriages, he acquired stepchildren

- In 1928, he married Else Bongers (1907-1993) who later came to eminence on her own account as an actress, dancer and dance teacher. She came originally from Dessau, close to Paulick's own home town, Roßlau. They were student contemporaries at Dresden, though there is no obvious reason why Bongers' study of expressionist dance should have led her to the Architecture faculty. When Paulick emigrated to Shanghai in 1933, Else did not accompany, and the in 1940 marriage ended in divorce.
- In 1941 in Shanghai, he married Thea Hess, the divorced former wife of Wolfgang Hess, born Thea Danziger, who had accompanied him to Shanghai and who, in the context of her Jewish heritage, had reasons as persuasive as Paulick's own to leave Germany in 1933.
- In 1961, he married Gemma Geim (1916–93) in East Berlin. Geim, the daughter of a timber merchant, was an architect with a particular professional interest in the interiors of buildings.

== Commissions (selection) ==
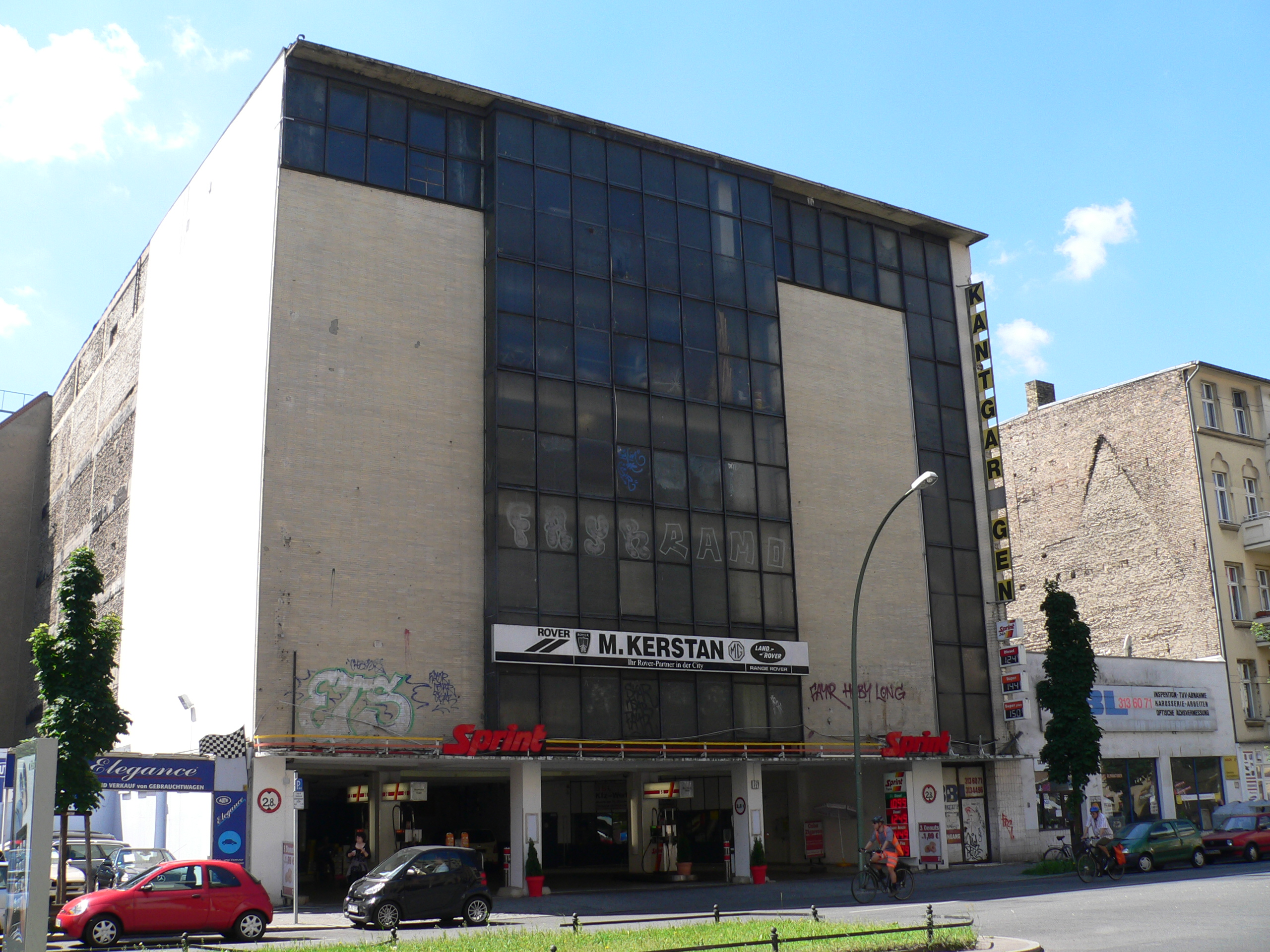
Kant-Garage is an important example of inter-war automotive architecture

- 1925–1926: Steel House, Dessau
- 1929–1930: Kant-Garage (innovative multi-storey car park), Berlin (jointly with Hermann Zweigenthal)
- 1930–1931: "DEWOG" Heidestraße residential development, Dessau
- 1951: Deutsche Sporthalle, Berlin (demolished 1971, following the identification of serious structural degradation)
- 1951: Proposal for a large government office building surrounded by an impressive city square, in central Berlin on the side of what has subsequently become known as the Marx-Engels Forum (never built).
- 1952: "Pionierrepublik Wilhelm Pieck" (East Germany's principal Young Pioneer camp, vacation/sports camp centre for the "Young Pioneers's" Baden-Powellian youth organisation), Lake Werbellin
- 1952–1953: development residential apartment blocks C-Nord and C-Süd in the Stalin-Allee (in 1961 renamed Karl-Marx-Allee), Friedrichshain
- 1950–1955: Rebuilding of the Berlin State Opera
- 1954–1955: Hildegard-Jadamowitz-Straße residential development, Friedrichshain
- 1954–1956: University for Transport, Dresden
- 1963: Lead architect for Halle-Neustadt
- 1962–1964: Reconstruction of the Princesses' Palace, Berlin
- 1968–1970: Reconstruction and extension of the adjacent Crown Prince's Palace, Berlin

== Recognition (selection) ==
- 1951 Goethe Prize from the city of East Berlin
- 1952 National Prize 1st class (awarded to an architecture collective of which he was part)
- 1954 Patriotic Order of Merit in silver (indicating that he will almost certainly already have won the bronze version in an earlier year)
- 1956 National Prize 2nd class (awarded to a collective of which he was part)
- 1963 Merit Medal of the German Democratic Republic
- 1967 Johannes-R.-Becher-Medaille in gold
- 1967 Handel Prize (Halle)
- 1968 Banner of Labor
- 1969 National Prize 3rd class (awarded to a collective of which he was part)
- 1978 Patriotic Order of Merit Gold clasp (indicating that he will almost certainly already have won the gold version of the award between 1955 and 1977)
