= Kant-Garage =

Coordinates: 52°30′21″N 13°18′43″E

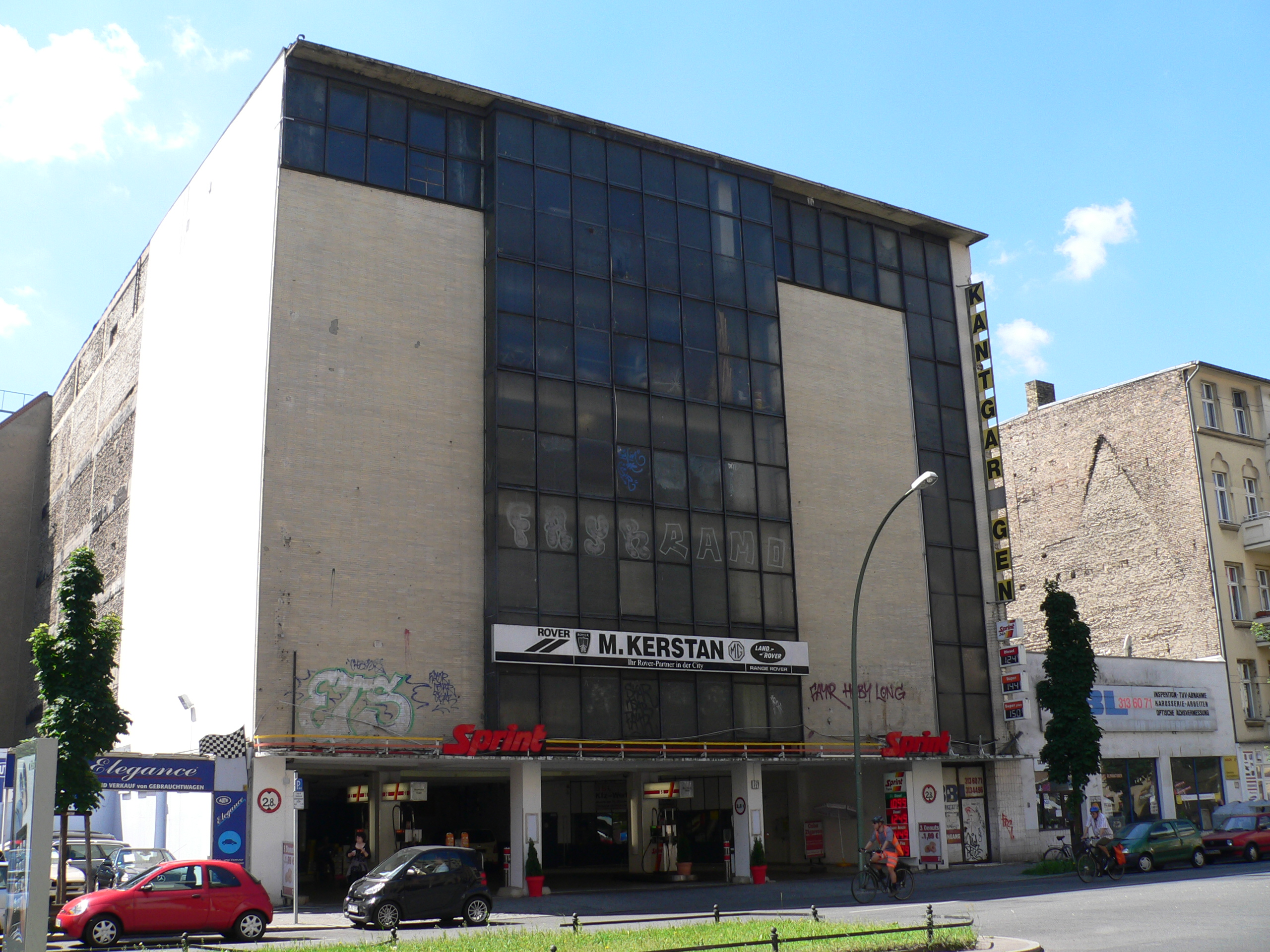
- Kant-Garage, Berlin is an important example of inter-war automotive architecture
- Interactive map of the Kant-Garage area

General information
- Type: Parking garage
- Location: Kantstrasse 126-127, Berlin, Germany
- Opening: 1930

Technical details
- Floor count: 5 (six storeys)

Design and construction
- Architects: Hermann Zweigenthal (1904-1968), Richard Paulick (1903-1979)
- Developer: Louis Serlin

Other information
- Parking: 300 automobiles

Kant-Garage, also known in German as Kant-Garagen-Palast (Kant Parking Palace), is a multi-storey car park on Kantstrasse in the Charlottenburg area of Berlin that opened in 1930.

The first multi-level parking garage in Berlin, and considered to be one of few existing examples of industrial Bauhaus architecture, it is registered as an historic building and is still used for car parking, although its future is in doubt.

== Design ==
Kant-Garage was designed by architect Hermann Zweigenthal (also known as Hermann Herrey) and Richard Paulick in collaboration with entrepreneur and engineer Louis Serlin. The engineering of the design was the creation of the firm Lohmüller, Korschelt & Renker.

It is a six-storey garage with 300 parking spots, 200 of which were designed as boxes with steel doors to meet fire regulations. The back of the building is covered with a curtain wall. The ramp-system of the garage – a double-helix ramp, also known as a double-spiral ramp – was the first of its kind in Germany.

== Present ==
Today, it is considered unique as the oldest garage with this style of ramp in Europe, and the second oldest in the world. The garage was registered as an historic monument in 1991, and is considered an important example of inter-war automotive architecture. Its future is uncertain as its owner has applied for it to be demolished.

== Gallery ==
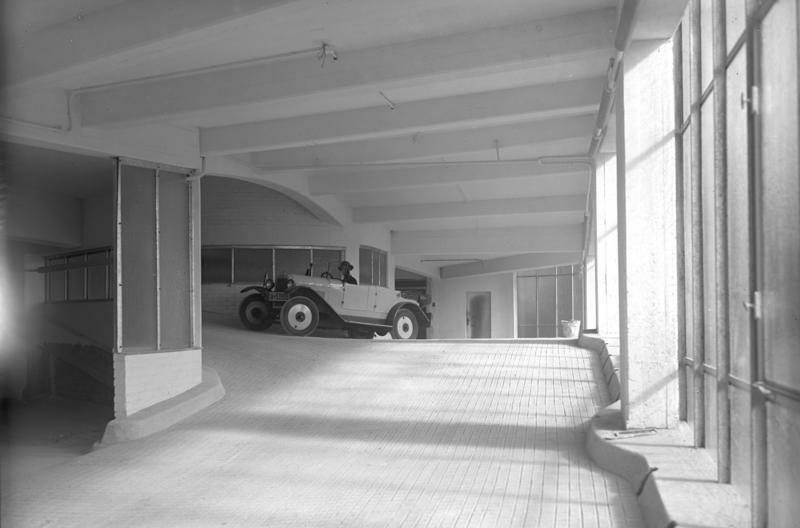
Interior, 1930

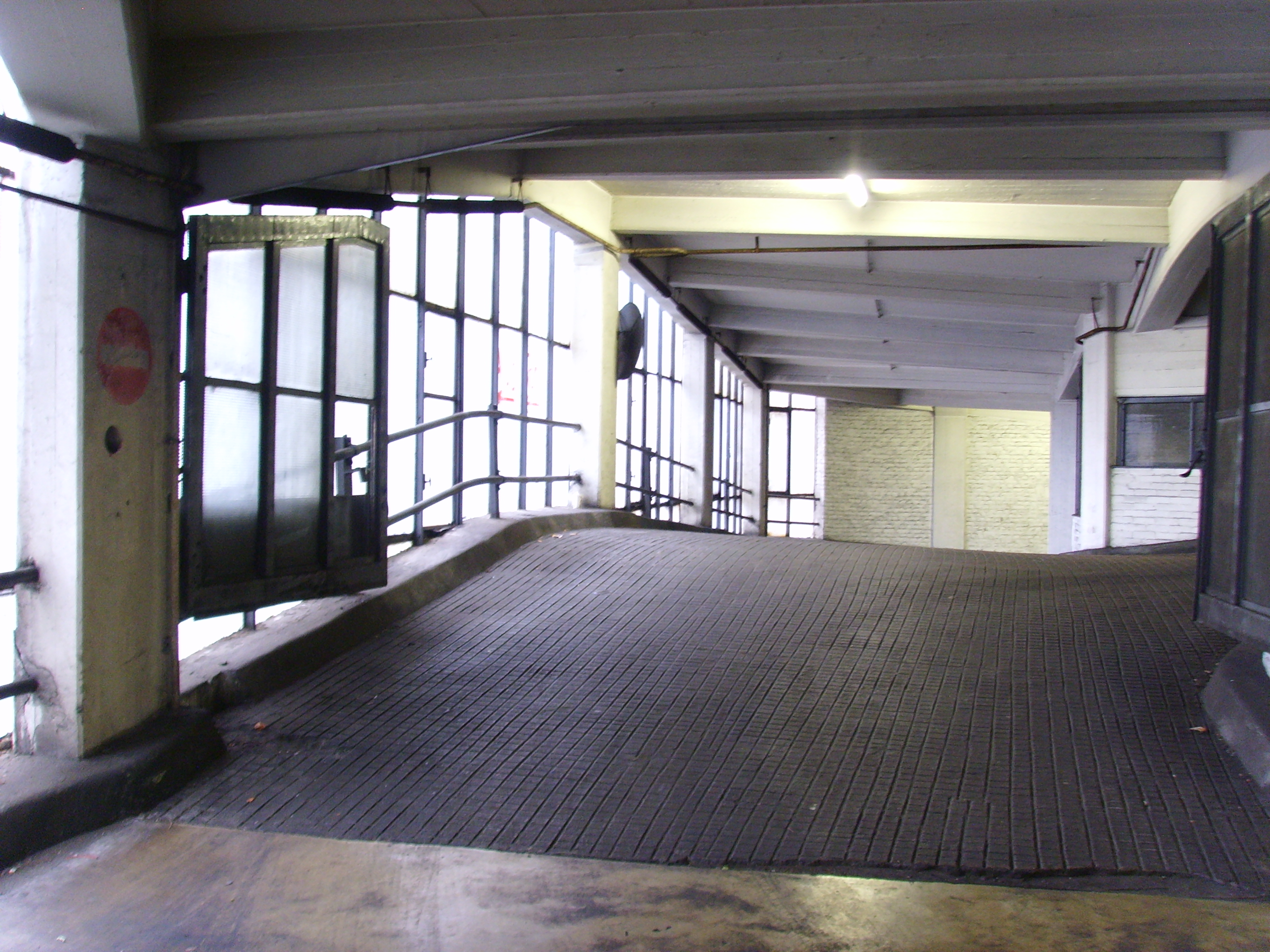
Interior, 2007

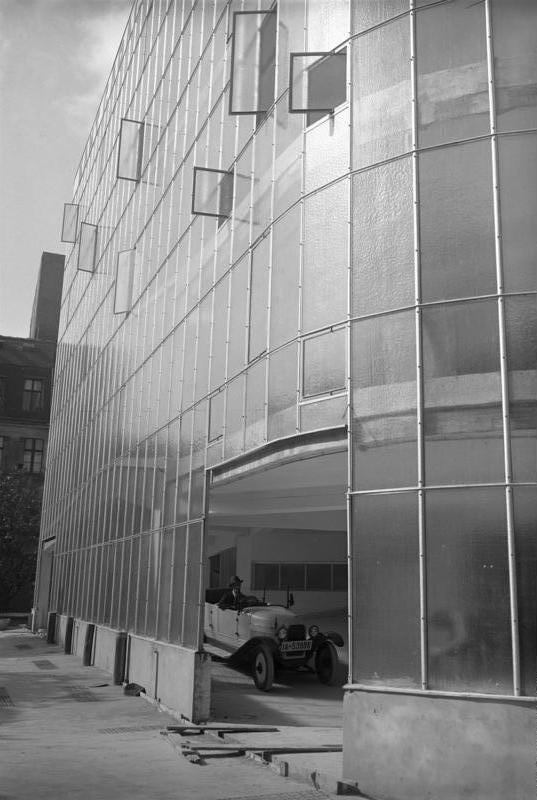
Glass curtain wall, 1929/30

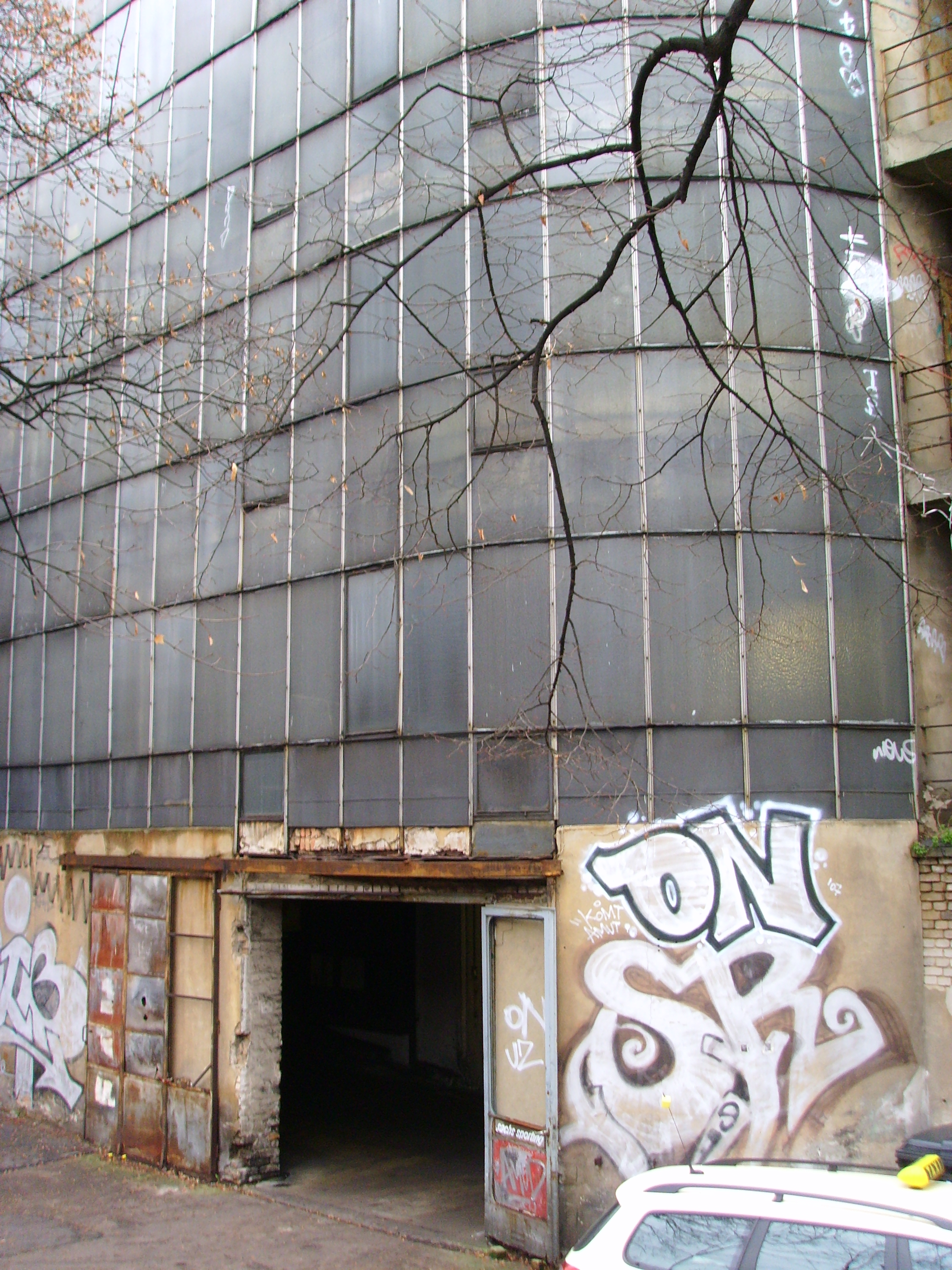
Glass curtain wall, 2007

== External sources ==
- Custom Carports
- Garage Door Repair
- Bauwelt, 2004, Heft 17, S. 14–19
- Bauwelt, 1930, Heft 42, S. 1350–1351.
- Die Form, 1932, Heft 8, S. 247, 251–254.
- Jan Gympel: Schrittmacher des Fortschritts – Opfer des Fortschritts? Bauten und Anlagen des Verkehrs. (Schriftenreihe des Deutschen Nationalkomitees für Denkmalschutz, Band 60). Bonn 1999, S. 34.
- Parkplätze Dreihundert. In: Baunetzwoche, Nr. 239, 16. Sept. 2011, S. 8–10 PDF in German
- Background to the garage, with biographies of Richard Paulick and Hermann Zweigenthal
- Uncertainty Over a Palace of Parking - Berlin Journal, The New York Times, August 20, 2013, by Melissa Eddy
