= Halle-Neustadt =

City in East Germany

Coordinates: 51.4789°N 11.9214°E

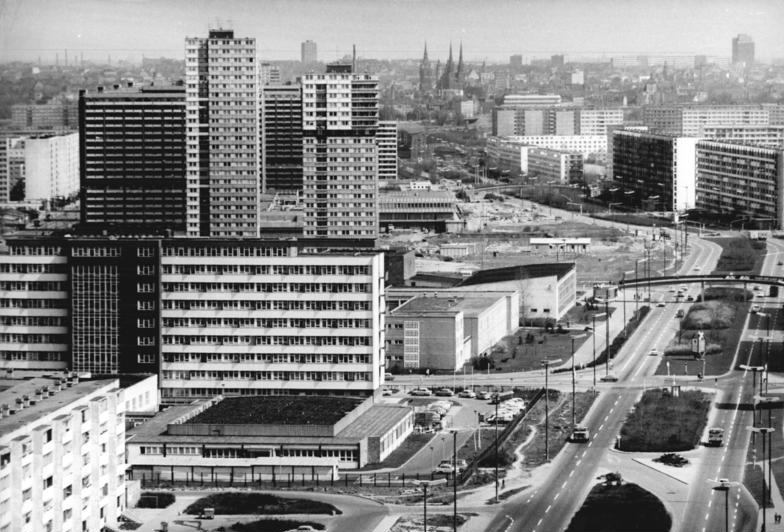
Halle-Neustadt in 1982

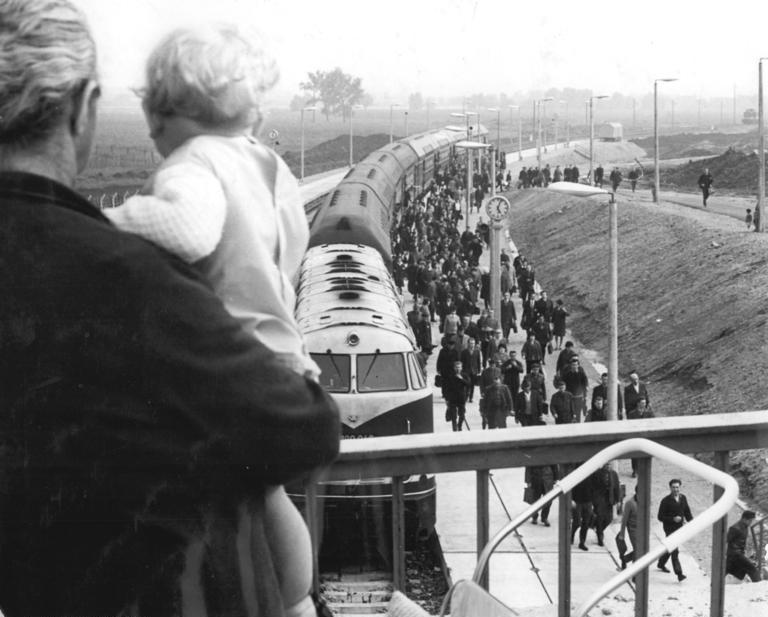
The rail link to Leuna and Buna, Halle-Neustadt railway station, now Zscherben street (Zscherbener Straße) in 1967

Halle-Neustadt (German pronunciation: [ˈhalə ˈnɔʏʃtat]), popularly known as HaNeu (pronounced [haːˈnɔʏ], like Hanoi), was a city in the German Democratic Republic (East Germany). It was established as a new town on 12 May 1967, as an independent and autonomous city. The population in 1972 was 51,600 and in 1981 was more than 93,000. On 6 May 1990, Halle-Neustadt merged back into Halle again. The population has halved since then and was about 45,157 inhabitants on 31 December 2010.

The development itself extends east to west for approximately 4 kilometres (2 1/2 miles) and is approximately one kilometre (1,100 yards) wide. Much of the housing is located within the international mass transit standard of 400 metres (yards) from a station on the core axis. Virtually all housing is high rise, with some towers reaching 11 floors. Medium rise buildings tend to have six floors without lifts.

Since the dissolution of East Germany and the subsequent deconstruction of much of East German Industry, the town has, like many other East German towns, suffered from population loss. There are a number of empty buildings, including high rise buildings, and even some that have been gutted. The city of Halle itself has lost a quarter of its population in barely 15 years — and it appears that most of the exodus has come from Halle Neustadt. Residents have taken the opportunity to move to the city itself or to the suburban communities that ring Halle.

Some residential buildings are being redeveloped by the private sector. There is what appears to be a privately developed shopping centre in the core, with a multistory car park and numerous businesses. Parking is now provided adjacent to the remaining occupied apartment buildings. In the beginning, garages were provided on the eastern fringe of the development for those that had cars.

== History ==
The actual history of the city began in 1958 with a conference of the Central Committee of the SED on "Chemistry Programme of the GDR" at which the settlement of labour in the vicinity of chemical sites Buna - Schkopau and Leuna was decided. Following extensive site investigations and planning in the district of Halle, the Politburo of the SED decided on 17 September 1963, the construction of the "Chemical Workers' City," known by the inhabitants in short as Neustadt or "Ha-Noi". The city was built at a greater distance from the chemical plants.

Chief architect of Halle-Neustadt was Richard Paulick, his deputies and heads of design groups were Joachim Bach, Horst Siegel, Karl-Heinz Schlesier, and Harald Zaglmaier.

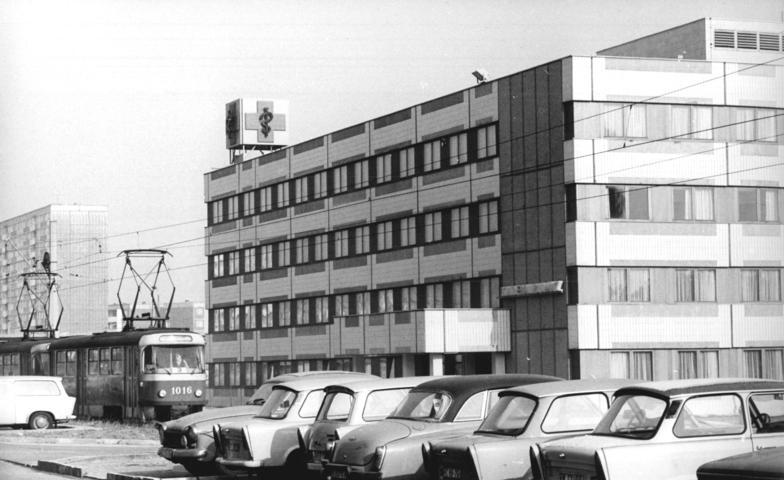
Halle-Silberhöhe Poliklinik

Already in the previous century (around 1900), there was a need for new housing areas because of the rapidly growing population. The north–south extent of the old city - wedged between the Saale in the west and railroad tracks and industrial areas in the east - was one of the main problems. For this reason, areas west of the old city and the Saale were considered. Because of the extremely difficult geological and hydro-logical conditions, especially high water, the development of this area for another residential location for the town was discarded. In the 1920s, the idea was taken up again but again shelved.

The new city was built on the edge of the river Saale between the small towns Zscherben and Nietleben which was mostly demolished. Remnants of the rural character of that settlement have been preserved only along the ridge road. With the establishment of the South Park residential area, this road eventually became a kind of rural oasis in a city-scape otherwise dominated by skyscrapers.

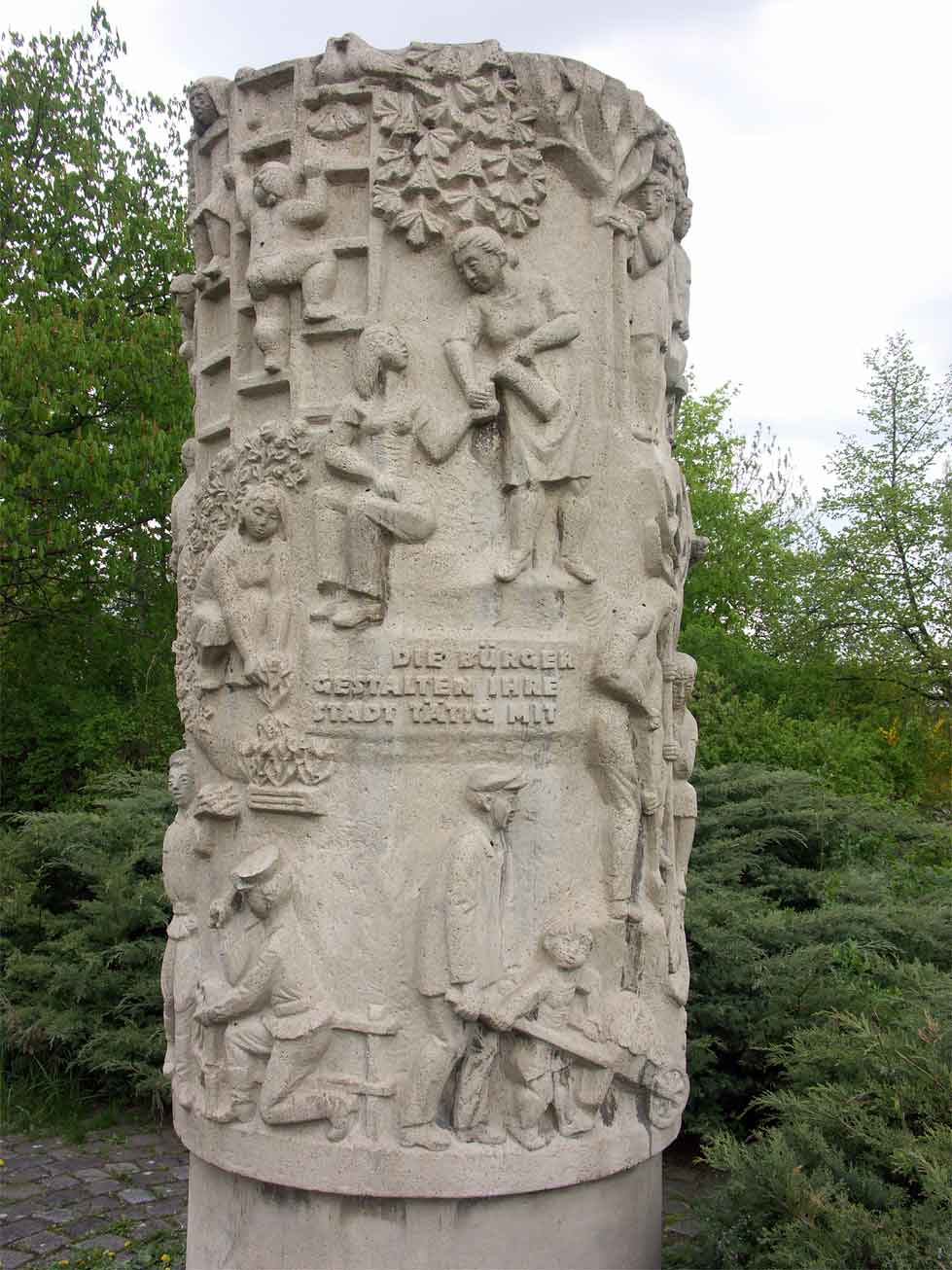
The Elan der frühen Jahre: "Aufbauhelfer" (Elan of the early years: "reconstruction workers") (1975) by Rudolf Hilscher

On 1 February 1964, a concrete plant was opened which produced the precast concrete (Plattenbau) for the new city. On 15 July 1964, Horst Sindermann, First Secretary of the SED district leadership in Halle, laid the foundation stone for the construction of the new socialist town west of the city of Halle (Saale) on the grounds of the school "First POS." In contrast to subsequent schools, which were named for personalities and officials, the school retained the name "Initial POS." The style of the school and the second POS "Ernst Thälmann" stood out from the other 28 schools. The other schools were equipped with "safe" nuclear bunkers located in their basements with a ventilation system. One example is the connecting wing of the former 16th POS "Otto Grotewohl" and 15th POS "Hermann Matern." A year later on 9 August 1965, the first tenants moved into Halle-Neustadt.

Even before completion of the first residential complex in 1968, on 12 May 1967, the new settlement of Halle-Neustadt-West officially withdrew from the city of Halle (Saale). From 1970 to 1990, Liane Lang was mayor of the city.

The new city was named "City of the Chemistry Workers." A number of apartment blocks in the northern city area were reserved for Soviet troops and their families. After their return to the Soviet Union in the 1990s, these blocks stood empty.

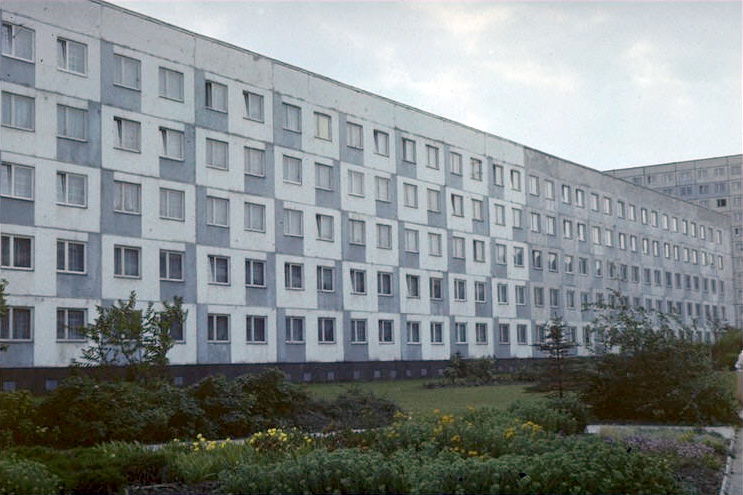
Typical view of the residential blocks in Halle-Neustadt, about 1978

As major infrastructure facilities were completed late or never - for example, hotels or department stores were not built - Halle-Neustadt remained hardly more than a bedroom community for the shift workers in the chemical plants and their families. The development of the city remained "unsatisfactory" because a central tram line was not built along the highway, officially due to lack of electrical power capacity. Buses and the train therefore bore the brunt of public transport. In the city center there was a tunnel station which provided a direct commuter link to the Merseburg chemical combines Buna and Leuna Schkopau. An existing tram line from the center of Halle (Saale) only reached the VIII residential complex on the eastern edge, providing only a fraction of the city with service.

In 1983 the last new cinema of the GDR was opened (in 2000 it was demolished to make way for a new shopping center with a multiplex cinema). It remained one of the few cultural amenities. More sophisticated shopping and culture could be found in the old city of Halle (Saale). Recreational opportunities included the adjacent mixed forest heath Dölauer with its Heidesee and "channel" (remnants of the unfinished Elster-Saale-channel).

Historical population
Year	Pop.	±%
1965	595	—
1966	3,982	+569.2%
1968	19,208	+382.4%
1970	35,180	+83.2%
1974	67,956	+93.2%
1983	91,563	+34.7%
1993	83,803	−8.5%
1996	77,650	−7.3%
1999	65,084	−16.2%
2000	58,195	−10.6%
2005	50,293	−13.6%
2010	45,157	−10.2%
2015	45,025	−0.3%
2019	45,661	+1.4%

Unlike later "Plattenbau" settlements of the GDR, Halle-Neustadt was generously decorated with artistic details in the construction and especially in residential complex I. There is also lush greenery. Its architectural highlight is a 380-metre (1,250 ft) long, 11 story residential block called the "Block 10," the longest apartment building ever built in the GDR. To ensure that this did not create an obstacle to free movement, this building had three passages for pedestrians. In this block lived up to 2,500 people, more than Wörlitz at this time with which it is often compared. A portion of this block was used as a nursing home.

The other eight residential complexes were later built much tighter, so there was that much less space for green areas. This was largely due to the housing programme of the GDR. The need for housing was great.

As each of the five building complexes had a planned centre with a department store, health clinic, restaurants, schools, kindergartens and sports facilities, a central square with a 100-metre (330 ft) high prominent "House of Chemistry" was to be built, but was never constructed due to cost. Only a large gaping trench between the main post office and the theatre complex remained in which groundwater and rainwater collected.

An unusual feature was the absence of street names. Instead, all residential blocks were designated with a complex numbering system difficult for outsiders to understand (after 1990, this was abolished in favour of street names). The starting point was the "Main S-Bahn" axis. Each apartment complex has one or two digits for the hundreds place (except for the houses along the highway, all of which had a leading "0" if they were on the main road). The tens digit depended on the number of streets from the central axis. The single digit was then the corresponding building.

State and party leader Erich Honecker had little interest in the pet project of his predecessor Walter Ulbricht and his chemical industry dream. Honecker focused instead on the capital Berlin and a countrywide housing programme. Not until 1989 was the town hall built, but due to the municipality's reincorporation into Halle (Saale), it never served its original purpose. The centre of the city was the Neustaedter Passage with two levels of department stores, speciality stores, the Central Clinic, the Main Post Office and the House of Services. This area should have included the town hall, but construction was held up at the time by decision makers, was interrupted several times and only finished in 1990. The "Slices" are five 18-story tower blocks with centre aisle structures which included student dormitories for the Martin-Luther-University, as well as worker dormitories of the chemistry combines Buna and Leuna. They were built between 1970 and 1975 and are now empty except for one tower block. The City Council has had difficulties to this day with the demolition of the unused towers since the Slices form the backbone of the town's architecture. In one of the Slices, the JV Hall, the administration and the New Town Passage have been extensively renovated by numerous long-term unemployed people since 2005. On the outskirts of Halle-Neustadt was also the complex of the once-powerful Ministry for State Security which is now being used as a tax office.

== After 1990 ==
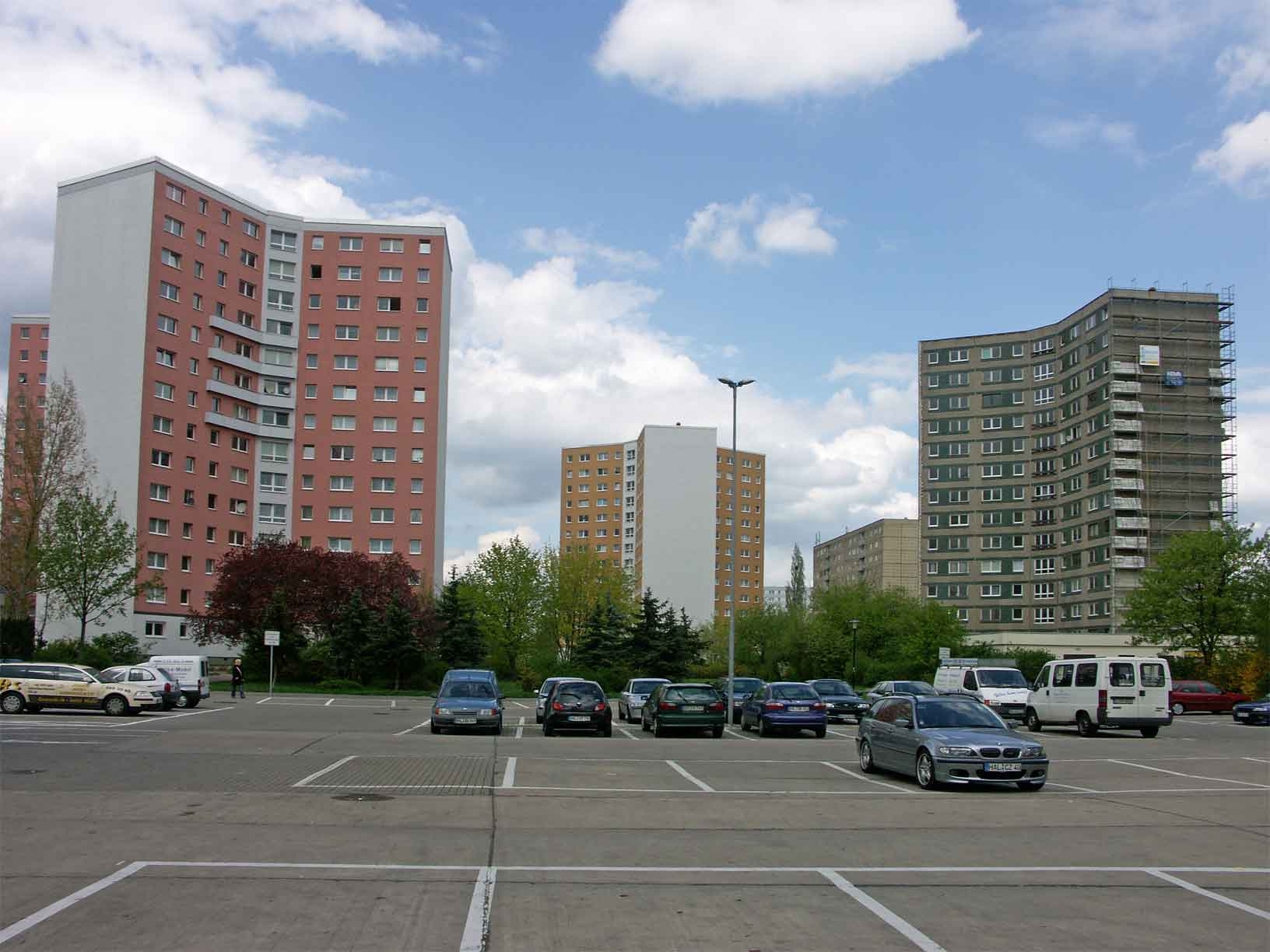
The Y-type plattenbau, both renovated and non-renovated

Following a vote at the municipal election on 6 May 1990, Halle-Neustadt was combined with the old town of Halle. Since then, Halle (Saale) has comprised the districts of Northern Town, South Town, Western New Town and New Town industrial area.

The population has declined significantly since 1990 (48,941 inhabitants, as of 31 December 2006). Many who could afford it have moved away (also from the old town), others had to leave to find work outside the region. The generation of the original tenants, now mostly retired, still like living in this neighbourhood despite the social problems that arise. The rising vacancy rate means that the first residential block in the programme will be demolished. At the same time, renovation of the housing stock has improved the quality of life for residents. Other improvements include the extension of the tram network to connect Halle Neustadt to other districts of the city of Halle (Saale) and the construction of several supermarkets and shopping centres which opened from 2000 onwards.

In 2006 an exhibition of the Federal Cultural Foundation entitled "Shrinking Cities" was opened in Halle-Neustadt.

After a pedestrian bridge had been extensively renovated, it fell victim to the construction of the new tram route. Some pedestrian tunnels were replaced by surface crossings with traffic lights that are intended to calm vehicular traffic.

The IBA Urban Redevelopment 2010 plan has the theme of balancing the old and new cities. Projects planned in the area of New Town are the construction of a skating rink in the southeast of the community centre and the redevelopment of the central square in the residential area with tulips and the Grünen Galerie (Green Gallery).

== Gallery ==
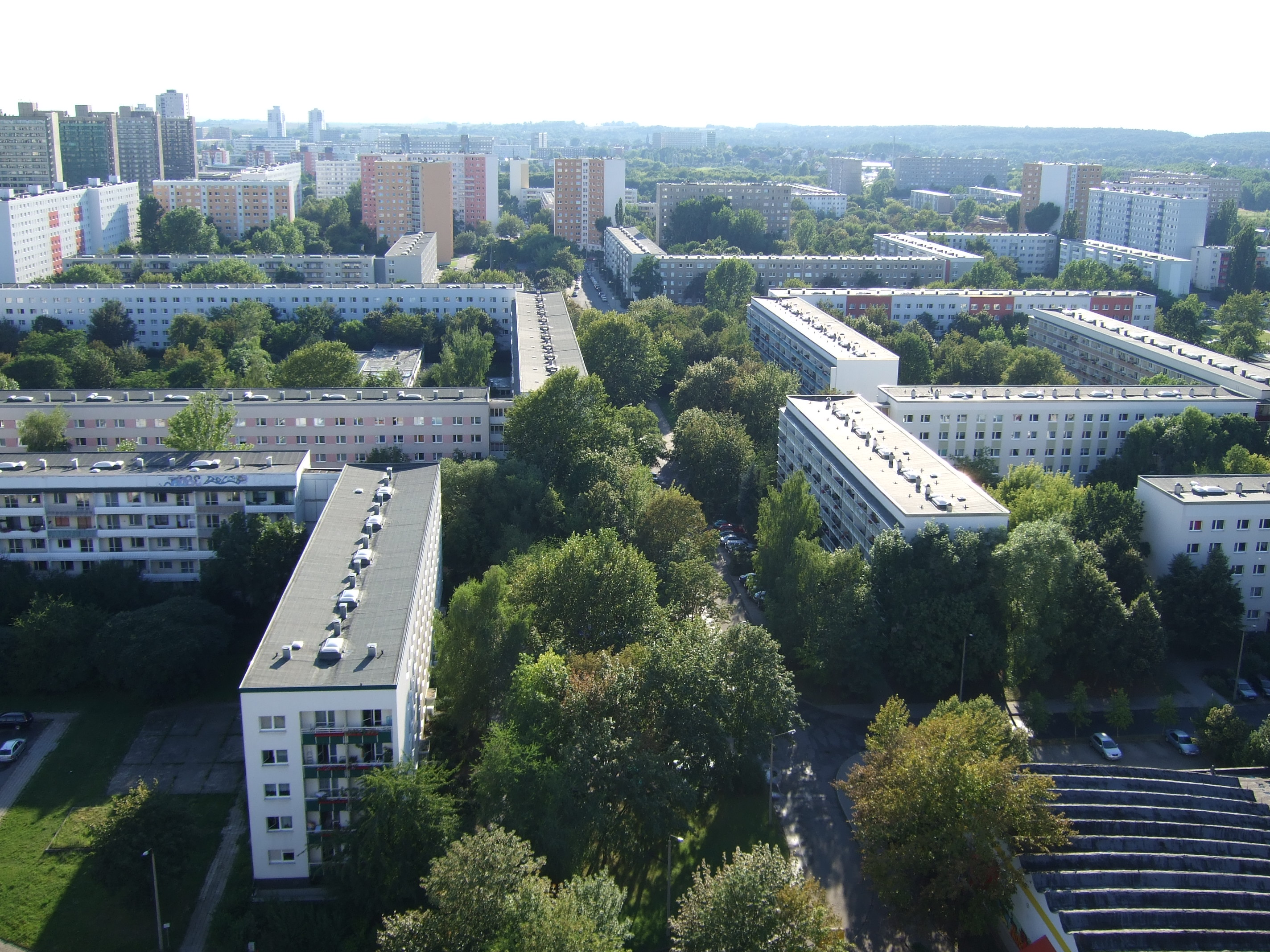
Halle-Neustadt from above

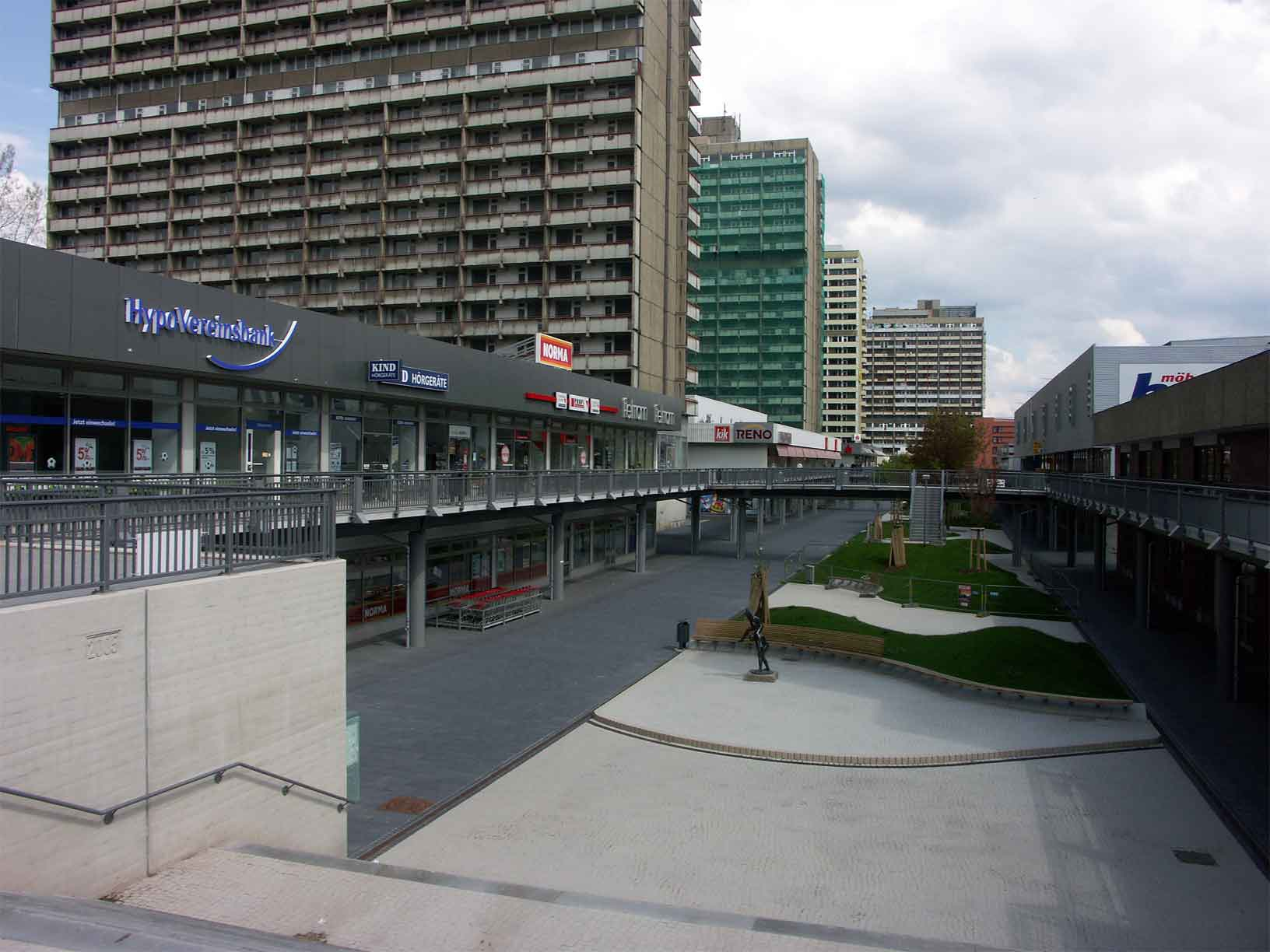
Halle-Neustadt Passage

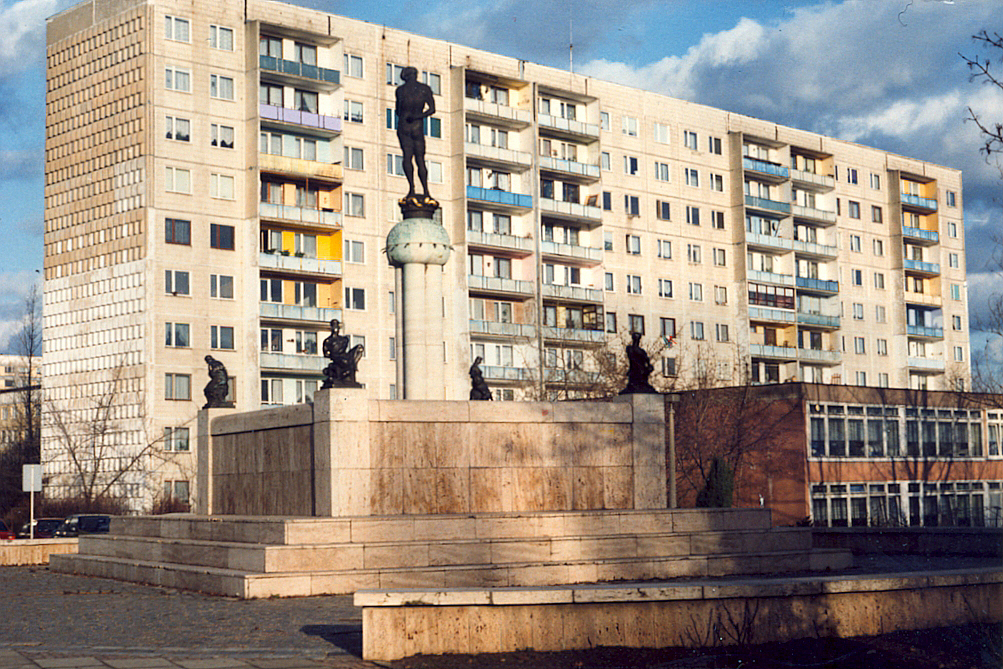
Hodja Nasreddin, 1980/2001, partially gilded bronze by Bernd Göbel (born 1942)

== Coat of arms ==
Arms of Halle-Neustadt

The emblem was adopted on 10 July 1984, by the city council of Halle-Neustadt on the festive occasion of the 20th anniversary of the groundbreaking decision. This city coat of arms was used until 6 May 1990, the date of the incorporation of the new city.

Depiction: "In red three silver gushing forth from the bud of a golden-green doves flying up, lying about a golden key, enclosing the form of a hexagonal ring covered with a red six-pointed star."

The centre of the emblem is a stylised image group of doves, a symbol of peace. These resemble Picasso's peace doves from afar. The city could and can only flourish in peace. The birds rise from the centre, symbolising joy, optimism and a bright future. The gold key emblem represents the ten thousand keys in the new city, promising a better quality of life and future. To elucidate the function of Halle-Neustadt in chemical workers' city, the closing of the key blade was in the form of a benzene ring. The emblem symbolises the close relationship between Halle and Halle-Neustadt by the inclusion of a six-pointed star and using the arms of the city hall. The red star is related to the labour movement.
