= Marx-Engels Forum =

Park in Berlin, Germany

- Marx-Engels-Forum
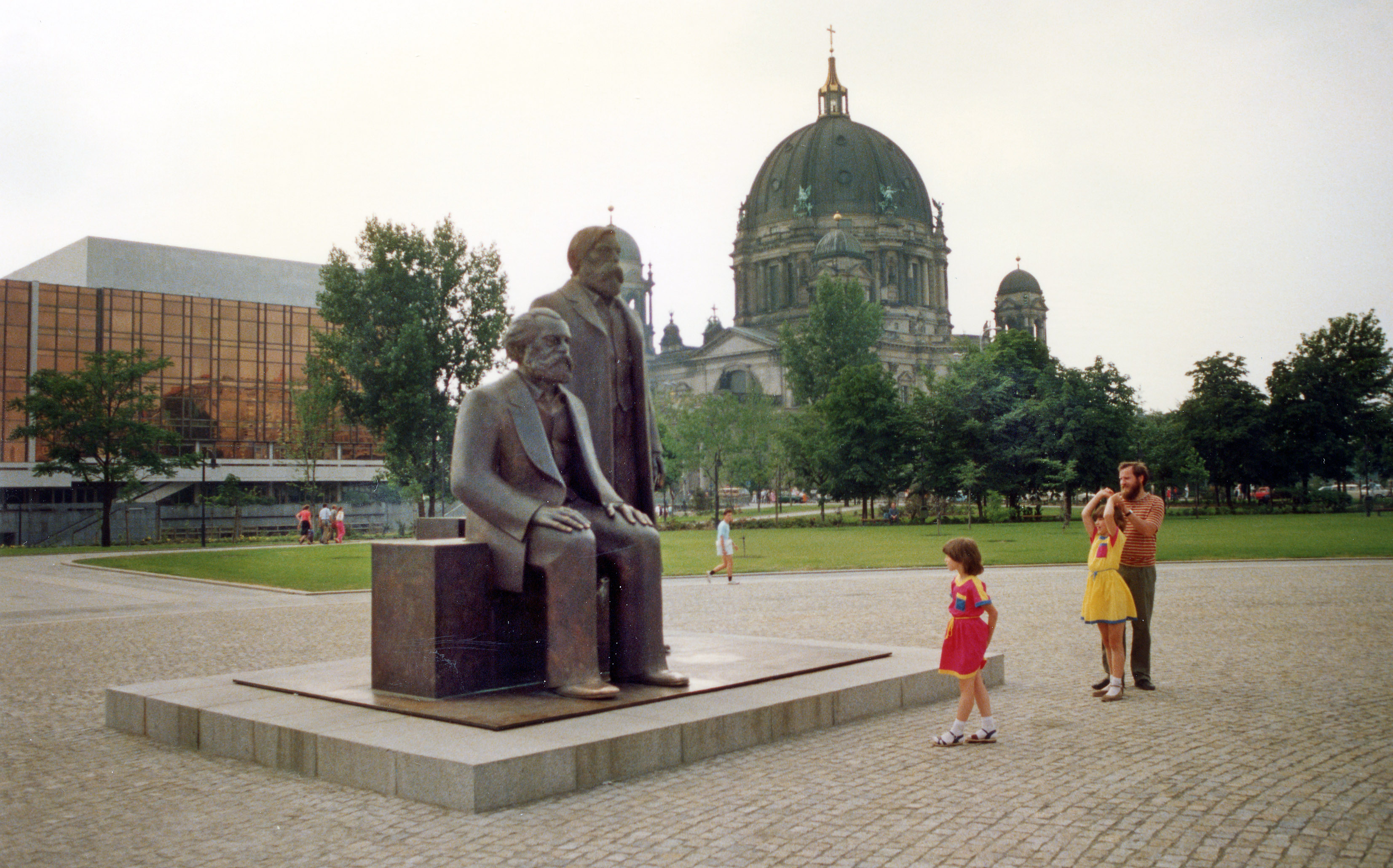
- Marx-Engels Forum in 1986. In the background Palast der Republik and the Berliner Dom.

- Location within Central Berlin Location within Germany
- Location: Berlin, Germany
- Coordinates: 52°31′06″N 13°24′15″E
- Opened: 4 April 1986
- Public transit: M4 M6

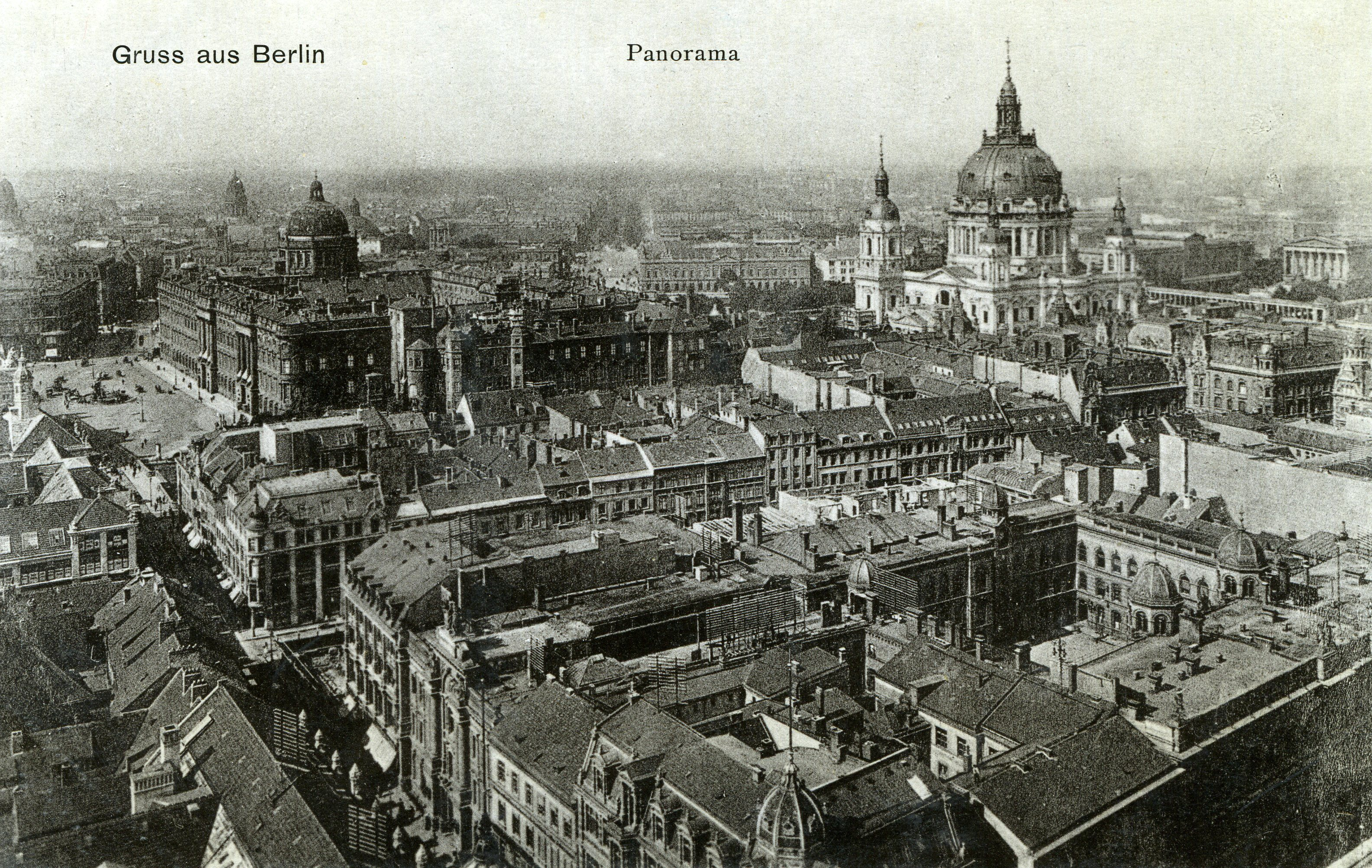
Old Town quarter Heilige-Geist-Viertel, in the background is the Berlin Palace and the Berliner Dom, taken from the tower of the Rotes Rathaus, c. 1910

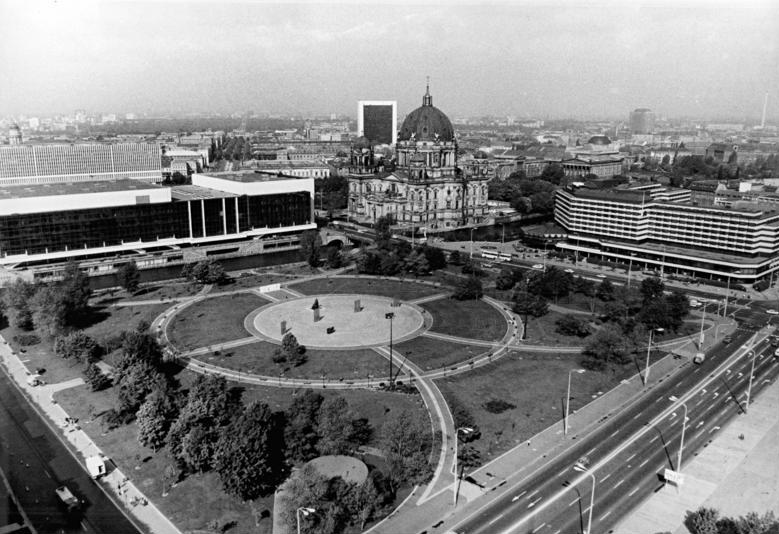
Similar perspective, taken from the tower of the Rotes Rathaus, 1987

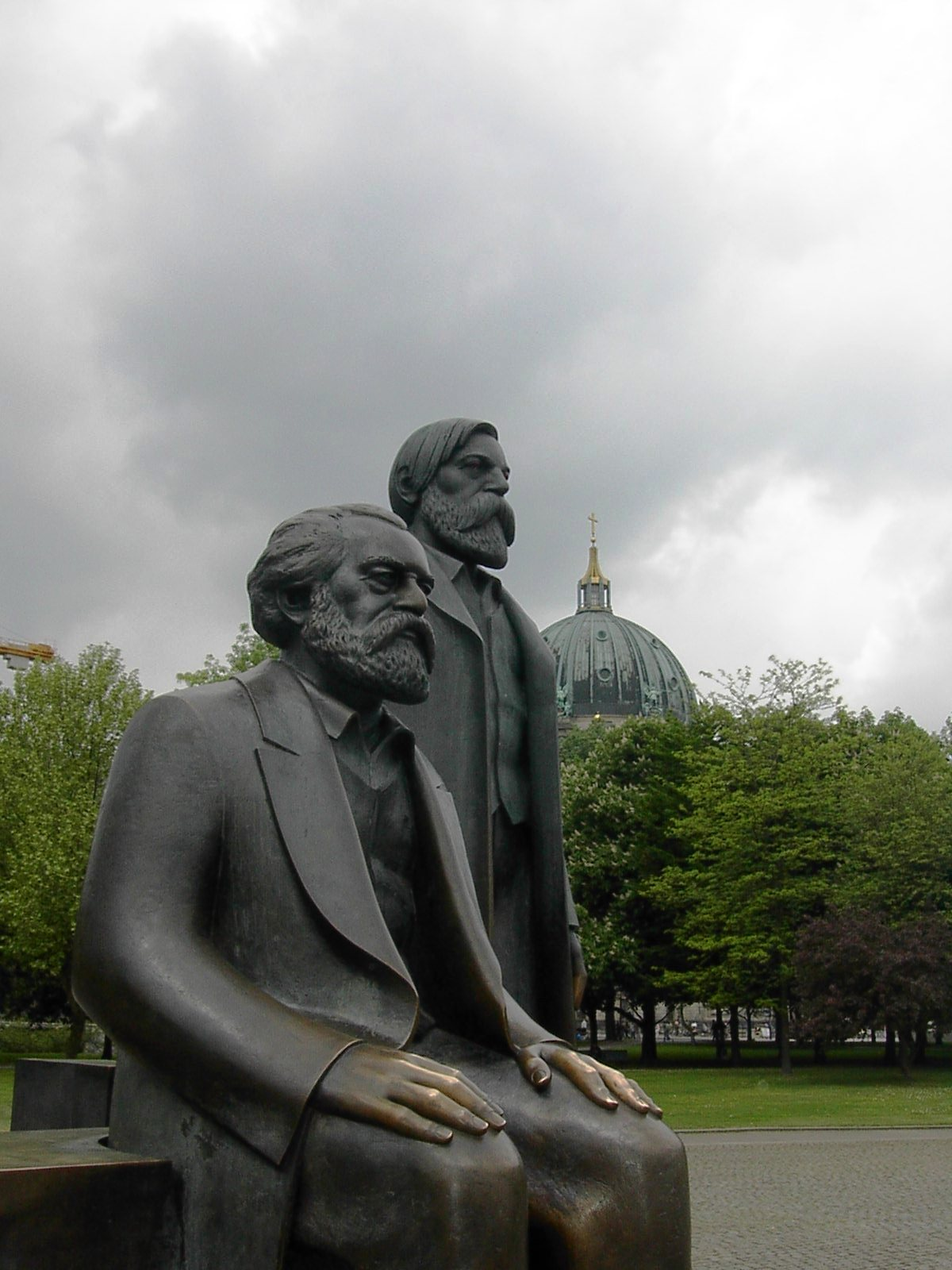
The statues of Karl Marx (foreground) and Friedrich Engels in Marx-Engels-Forum. In the background is the dome of the Berliner Dom.

Marx-Engels-Forum is a public park in Berlin featuring a statue of Karl Marx and Friedrich Engels. The park was created by Ludwig Engelhardt in 1986.

== Location ==
The Marx-Engels-Forum lies on the eastern bank of the Spree river. It is bound on the south-west by the river, to the north-west by Karl-Liebknecht-Straße, to the north-east by Spandauer Straße and to the south-east by Rathausstraße obliquely opposite of the Rotes Rathaus. Across the river it faces the site formerly occupied by the Palast der Republik (now demolished) and the reconstructed Berliner Stadtschloss.

Before World War II the area now occupied by Marx-Engels-Forum was a densely populated Old Town quarter between the river and Alexanderplatz, named Heilige-Geist-Viertel after Heiligegeiststraße (Holy Ghost Street) which ran across it between Kaiser-Wilhelm-Straße (now Karl-Liebknecht-Straße) and Rathausstraße. This was supposed to finish the center appearance around the Berlin Stadtschloss (Berlin Palace) fitting in with the planning of the pre-war Berlin. However, this area, including the main post office, was heavily bombed during Allied air attacks in 1944/45 and most of its buildings were reduced to ruins. After the war the ruins were cleared but nothing replaced them until the Marx-Engels-Forum was constructed.

== Design and construction ==
In 1977, the sculptor Ludwig Engelhardt was appointed as director of the project to redevelop the park as a tribute to Marx and Engels. While the adjacent Nikolaiviertel was to be rebuilt, the GDR authorities in 1977 set up plans for a green space between the Palast der Republik and the Fernsehturm. It consists of a rectangular wooded park with a large, circular paved area in the center with Engelhardt's sculpture of Marx and Engels. Behind the statues is a wall with reliefs showing scenes from the history of the German socialist movement. The inauguration took place in 1986. The bronze sculpture, larger than life-size, depicts Marx seated and Engels standing upon a small platform, gazing fixedly towards the east, “past the stelae and toward a socialist paradise.”

In Engelhardt’s statue, Marx and Engels are situated at eye level, accessible to pedestrians and available to touch. The leaders are depicted in a humble, solemn manner, which is sometimes interpreted as symbolizing the waning power of East European Communism. Minister of Culture Hans-Joachim Hoffmann said of the monument, “We will soon have a Karl Marx monument and this Karl Marx monument will make clear the contrast with this Frederick the Second that is about to be erected, because it will be clear that we will not be looking up Karl Marx’s nostrils; rather, we will be able to hold conversations with him and with Friedrich Engels and there will be a new spirit, a new art, a new understanding of the portrayal of great social issues of the time.”

== Public reception and criticism ==
Engelhardt’s sculpture has elicited a range of reactions since its construction. Immediately after the statue was erected, the artist expressed his discontent with the little attention it was receiving. Engelhardt said in a letter written within the first six months of the statue’s appearance, “the silence surrounding our work was nearly unbroken.”

Soon after, however, the monument to the two leaders became well-liked by the Berlin public. Its main audience consisted of locals, travelers, artists, and academics, who liked and somewhat pitied the two modest looking figures, at one point even nicknaming them ‘The Pensioners.’

After German reunification in 1990, the future of the Marx-Engels Forum became the subject of public controversy. The sculpture was vandalized with the phrase Wir sind unschuldig (we are innocent) scrawled on the pedestal. A survey conducted by the Berlin art journal Pan inquired about the public’s thoughts on the monument; 67 percent of respondents were in favor of keeping the monument standing while 23 percent advocated for its removal. The former view eventually prevailed. The statues are now a tourist attraction, and a steady stream of people sit on Marx's knee to have their photos taken. With the planned extension of the U5 line of the Berlin U-Bahn turning the park into a construction site for several years, the Berlin mayor Klaus Wowereit has recently launched a discussion whether to rebuild the medieval quarter afterwards.
