= Kronprinzenpalais =

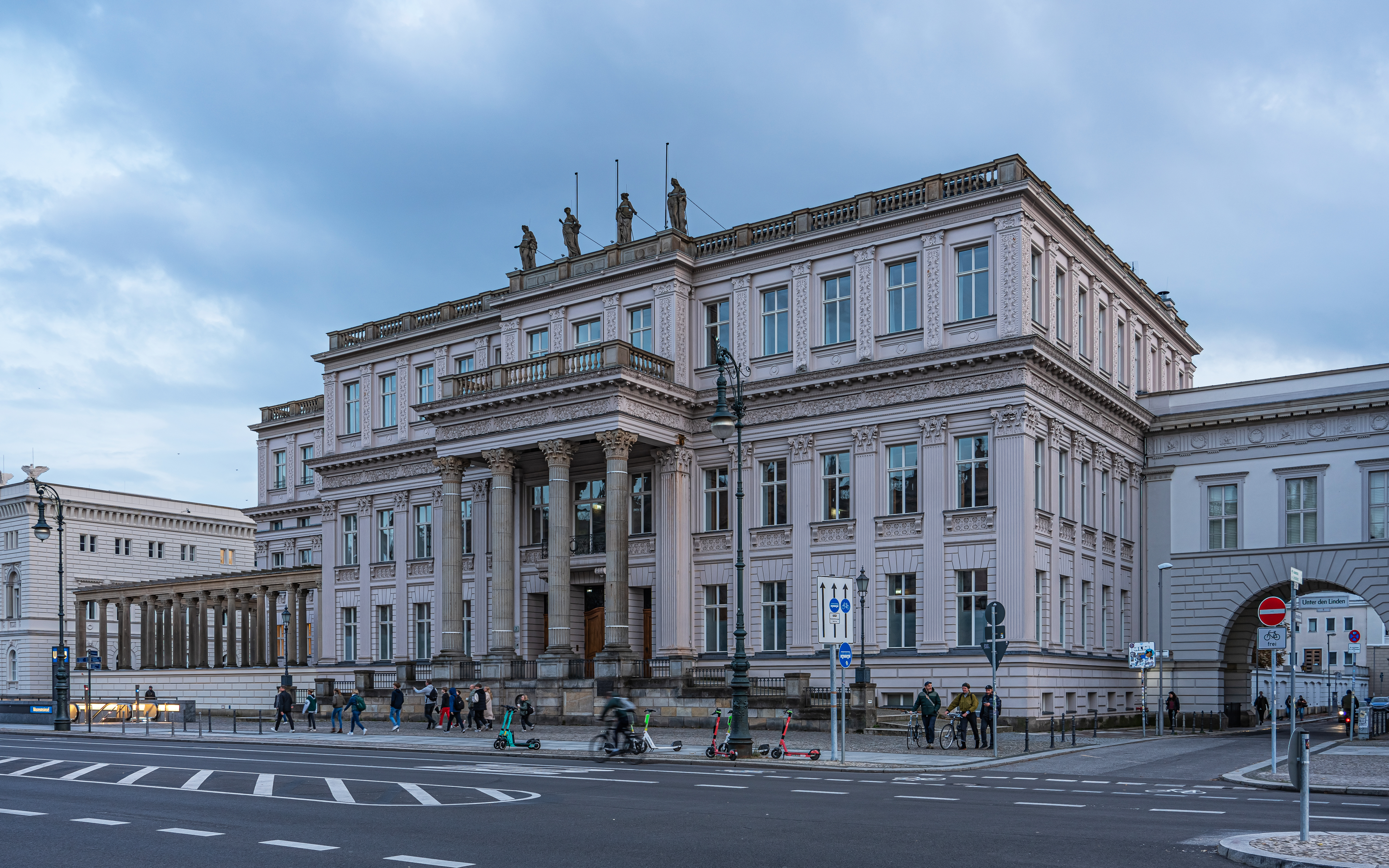
- Kronprinzenpalais

- Location within Berlin Location within Germany
- Former names: Königliches Palais

General information
- Type: Palace
- Architectural style: Neoclassical
- Location: Berlin, Germany
- Coordinates: 52.517°N 13.396°E
- Completed: 1663 (original); 1857 (renovation)
- Renovated: 1970 (reconstruction)

Design and construction
- Architects: J.A. Nering (1660s); Philipp Gerlach (1730s); Heinrich Strack (1850s); Richard Paulick (1960s)

The Kronprinzenpalais (English: Crown Prince's Palace) is a former Royal Prussian residence on Unter den Linden boulevard in the historic centre of Berlin. It was built in 1663 and renovated in 1857 according to plans by Heinrich Strack in Neoclassical style. From 1919 to 1937, it was home to the modern art collection of the National Gallery. Damaged during the Allied bombing in World War II, the Kronprinzenpalais was rebuilt from 1968 to 1970 by Richard Paulick as part of the Forum Fridericianum. In 1990, the German Reunification Treaty was signed in the listed building. Since then, it has been used for events and exhibitions.

== Earliest uses ==
Johann Arnold Nering created the building in 1663–69 as the private residence of Cabinet Secretary Johann Martitz, converting an existing middle-class house. From 1706 to 1732, it was the official residence of the governor of Berlin.

== Remodelling and use as a royal palace ==
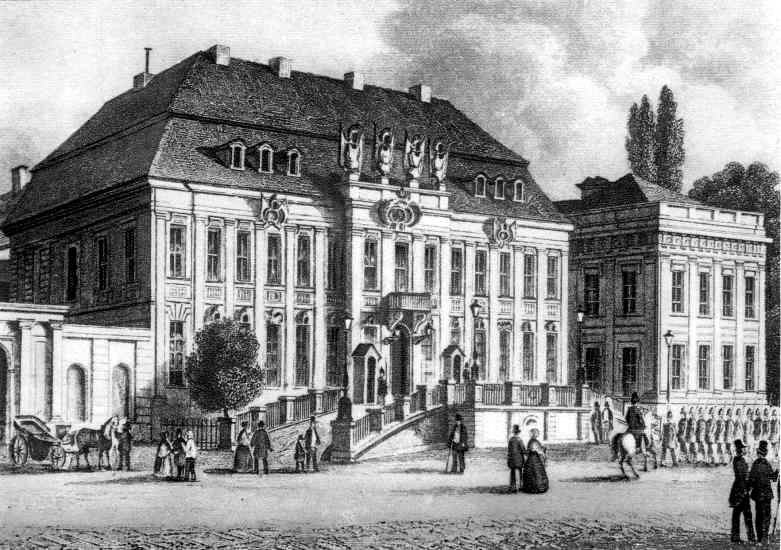
Kronprinzenpalais after its first rebuilding

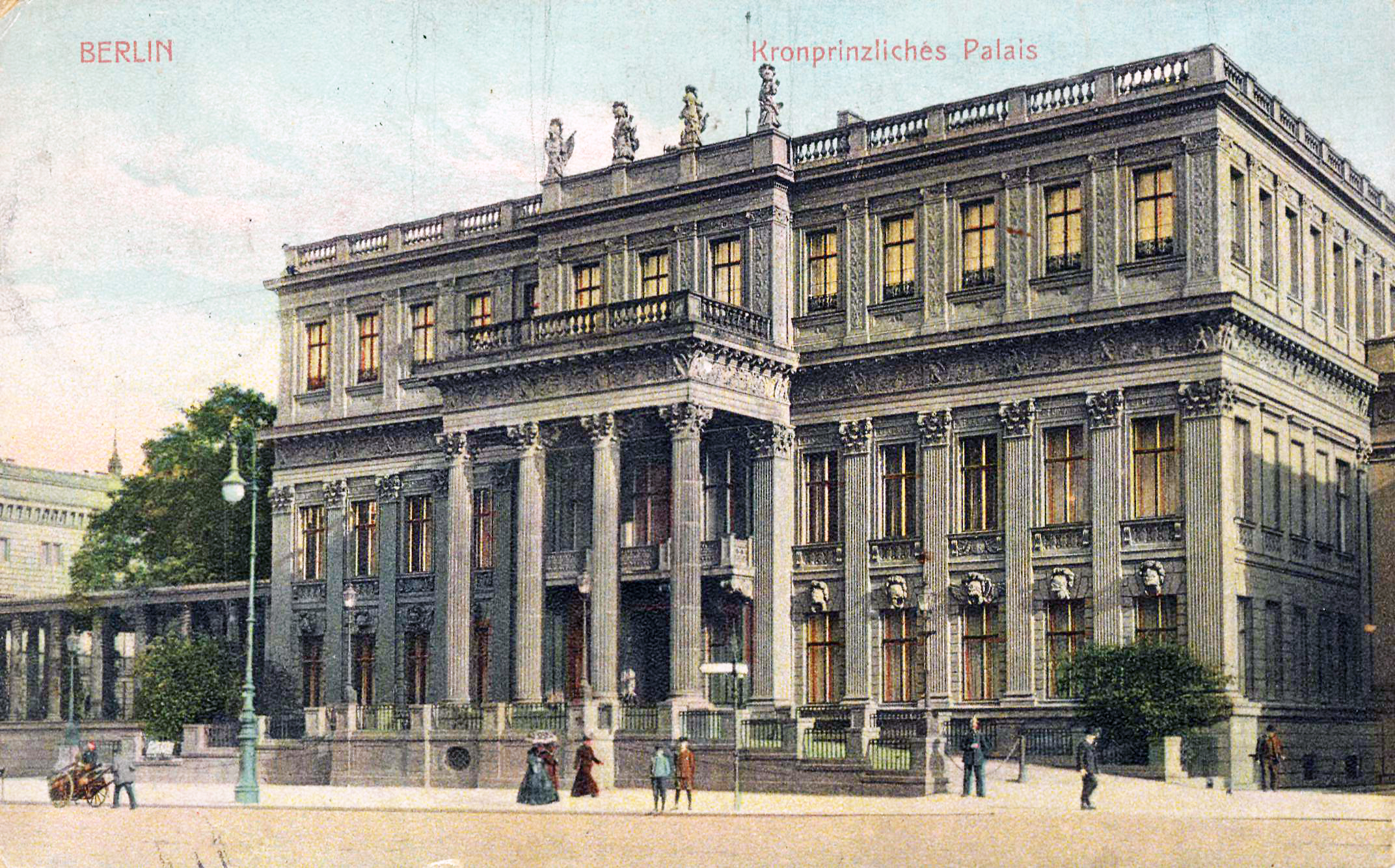
Kronprinzenpalais after remodelling by Johann Heinrich Strack, c. 1890

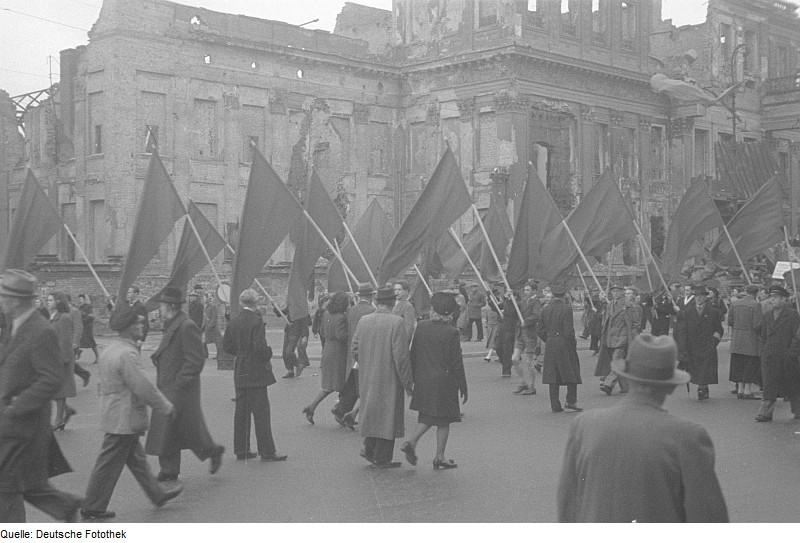
Kronprinzenpalais in ruins, 1947

In 1732, Philipp Gerlach remodelled the building in baroque style with a protruding central bay and a carriage drive rising to the front entrance, to serve as a residence for the Crown Prince, the future King Frederick II. He and his wife Elisabeth Christine stayed there only intermittently before his accession to the throne in 1740, after which he took up residence in part of the royal palace. He gave the Kronprinzenpalais to his brother Augustus William; after Augustus William's death in 1758, his widow continued to use it until 1780.

The building was then renovated and refurnished in Neoclassical style (with furniture from Prussia rather than France) and became the residence of Crown Prince Frederick William (the future Frederick William III) and his wife Louise, who lived there with their children and Countess Voss, who had an apartment near the entrance. They remained there after he became king and the Palace was now called Königliches Palais (Royal Palace). Johann Gottfried Schadow created his double statue of Crown Princess Louise and her sister Frederica, the Prinzessinnengruppe, in the palace in 1795–97. The future Emperor William I was born there on 22 March 1797. In the early 19th century, Karl Friedrich Schinkel renovated several rooms in the palace; he also designed an extension over the Oberwallstraße connecting the palace to the Kronprinzessinnenpalais (Crown Princesses' Palace), where the king's three daughters were living; this was built in 1811 by Heinrich Gentz in association with his remodelling of the exterior of the Prinzessinenpalais. After Louise's early death, Frederick William maintained a family shrine to her in the palace. The main building was known as the Königliches Palais (Royal Palace) until 1840; after 1840, when the king died, it was known as the former Royal Palace, and was not used by any members of the royal family; during the reign of Frederick William IV, it housed court officials, and Rudolf Lepke, who founded a major auction house, grew up there.

In 1856–57, Johann Heinrich Strack extensively rebuilt the palace for William I's son, Prince Frederick William (the future Kaiser Frederick III), giving it substantially its present appearance. Strack replaced the mansard roof with a third storey with Corinthian pillars, and added neo-classical details to the façade, whose columns he changed from Tuscan to Corinthian. The four statues above the entrance remained, but he added a tall columned portico surmounted by a balcony. He also built a setback addition on the east side of the building, with a colonnade on its Unter den Linden and Niederlagstraße sides. After 1861, when Frederick William's father acceded to the throne and he became Crown Prince, the building was once again known as the Kronprinzenpalais; he resided there with his wife Princess Victoria, daughter of England's Queen Victoria.

Their eldest son, who would be the last German Emperor as Wilhelm II, was born in the palace on 27 January 1859. Princess Victoria welcomed artists and scholars to the palace, including Heinrich von Angeli, Anton von Werner and Adolph von Menzel. However, after Frederick III's death in 1888 following a 99-day reign, she was usually at her new residence, Schloß Friedrichshof, and the palace was rarely used. Beginning in 1905, it was used as a winter residence by Wilhelm II's heir, Crown Prince Wilhelm, and his wife Crown Princess Cecilie. During the November revolution in Berlin in 1918, revolutionary leaders addressed the crowd from the entrance ramp of the palace.

== Modern annexe of the National Gallery ==
After the dissolution of the monarchy, the palace became a possession of the State of Prussia, which gave it to the National Gallery in 1919 to house its drawing collection. The director, Ludwig Justi, used this annexe to the existing building (now known as the Alte Nationalgalerie) to house a new department devoted to living artists, the Galerie der Lebenden, something which he had proposed the previous year and which contemporary artists themselves had been demanding. This opened on 4 August 1919 with approximately 150 paintings and sculptures including naturalistic and French Impressionist works, a sculpture by Rodin (in a room retaining the old palace décor, which also featured paintings by Cézanne, Van Gogh, and Manet), works representing both the establishment Verein Berliner Künstler and the Berlin Secession, and on the top floor in a temporary display, works by members of Die Brücke and other Expressionists. This was the first state promotion in Germany of Expressionist works, which were unpopular with large numbers of the public. The gallery was a pioneer of the museum of contemporary art; in the judgement of the assistant director of the National Gallery at the time, the collection was superior to that of all other German galleries then collecting modern art. It served as a model for later institutions, notably the Museum of Modern Art in New York, which opened two years after its first director, Alfred H. Barr Jr., visited the Kronprinzenpalais in 1927. On the other hand, the art critic Karl Scheffler, who favoured Impressionism and disliked Expressionism, attacked Justi for opening the contemporary art gallery, publishing a book in 1921 with the title Berliner Museumskrieg (Berlin Museum War).

After the Nazis came to power in 1933, there was an initial period of tolerance of modern art, but then Hitler ordered the galleries to be "cleansed" of it, in particular the Kronprinzenpalais. In May 1936, works from the Ismar Littmann collection of Expressionist art which had been confiscated by the Gestapo from a Berlin auction house were burnt in the furnace. Eberhard Hanfstaengl, the then director of the National Gallery, was ordered to set aside only a few "historically valuable" works and saved five paintings and ten drawings. The Expressionist gallery was closed in October 1936, after the Berlin Olympics had ended, as a "hotbed of cultural Bolshevism".

In the 1937 Nazi operation against Entartete Kunst (degenerate art), the National Gallery lost a total of 435 works. The Kronprinzenpalais contributed far more works than any other institution to the exhibition by that name which opened in Munich on 19 July. The majority of the Expressionist works were officially labelled Verfallskunst (art of decay) the same month. National Gallery Director Justi had been forced out in the 1933 purge of ideologically suspect academics and civil servants; his successor, Alois Schardt, was forced to resign after Bernhard Rust, the Nazi Minister of Education for Prussia, who had responsibility for museums, visited the modern art gallery; he was in turn succeeded by Hanfstaengl, who was also forced to resign after refusing to meet with Adolf Ziegler and his commission charged with identifying and removing the "degenerate" artworks. The commission made two "cleansing" visits to the Kronprinzenpalais: on 7 July before the exhibition opened and again in August. Some members of the commission were at first reluctant to purge the works of August Macke and Franz Marc, both of whom had died fighting in the First World War; they were ultimately also removed, but works by Marc including Tower of Blue Horses were removed from the Entartete Kunst exhibition before it moved from Munich to Berlin. The National Gallery was compensated RM 150,000 for The Garden of Daubigny by Van Gogh and RM 15,000 for four paintings by Paul Signac and Edvard Munch by Göring, who took a group of 13 modern paintings to offer them privately for sale through an art dealer he knew, and roughly one sixth of its total loss of over RM 1 million after the official auctions of "degenerate art" in Switzerland.

Later in 1937, the building became the seat of the Prussian Academy of Arts, whose building in Pariser Platz had been requisitioned by Albert Speer's office. The Director of the Schauspielhaus theatre in the Gendarmenmarkt, Gustaf Gründgens, also temporarily had his office in the building.

In March 1945, the Kronprinzenpalais was gutted in an Allied bomb attack. Until 1958, a ballet school used a remaining rear section, but the site was entirely cleared in 1961.

== Reconstruction and postwar uses ==
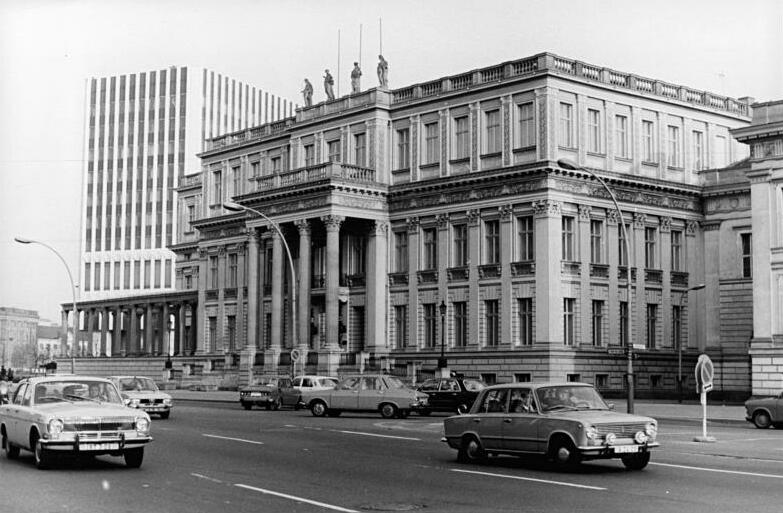
Reconstructed Palais Unter den Linden, 1980

In 1968–69, to complete the restoration of the south side of Unter den Linden and make a suitable visual transition to the newly completed Foreign Ministry skyscraper (since demolished) and the rest of the East German government district immediately to the east, the Kronprinzenpalais was rebuilt with approximately the same exterior appearance as after Strack's work by Richard Paulick, a former associate of Walter Gropius who had already rebuilt the Kronprinzessinnenpalais and the State Opera, and Werner Prendel. (Paulick had originally intended to rebuild it as it had been in 1733, for use as a modern museum, music school, or performance space, but conceptions of the role of the area changed in the 1960s.) However, the top floor was extended to include the east wing to improve the building's proportions, and the interior (1968–70) was modern. As the Palais Unter den Linden, it was used as a guest house by the Magistrat, the governing executive of East Berlin. The Unification Agreement was signed there on 31 August 1990, after which the Senate of Berlin took possession of the building.

The garden, which extends from Oberwallstraße to Niederlagstraße and has underground parking garages under part of it, was newly laid out in 1969–70 by W. Hinkefuß and descends in terraces to a central lawn, and then rises again in further terraces to a restaurant called the Schinkelklause, which incorporates pieces of terracotta and an entrance from Schinkel's Bauakademie, which was partially destroyed in World War II and demolished around 1960. The sculptures in the garden are by Senta Baldamus, Gerhard Thierse and Gerhard Lichtenfelds.

From 1998 to 2003, the Kronprinzenpalais was used as temporary exhibit space by the Deutsches Historisches Museum while its primary building, the Zeughaus across the street, was under renovation. It continues to be used for exhibitions and other cultural events. For example, in 2005 it housed an exhibition on Albert Einstein, and in spring 2006 Joshua Sobol's polydrama Alma, on Alma Mahler, played scenes simultaneously in various rooms, which required temporarily reconstructing the historical appearance of the interior. In 2006 the building housed Erzwungene Wege—Flucht und Vertreibung im Europa des 20. Jahrhunderts, a controversial exhibition on expulsions of Germans in 20th-century Europe organised by the Federation of Expellees, and in March–June 2012 it housed a three-part exhibition dealing more broadly with forced exile and including Erzwungene Wege as one of its components. The building is a Berlin historic landmark.

The four statues over the entrance
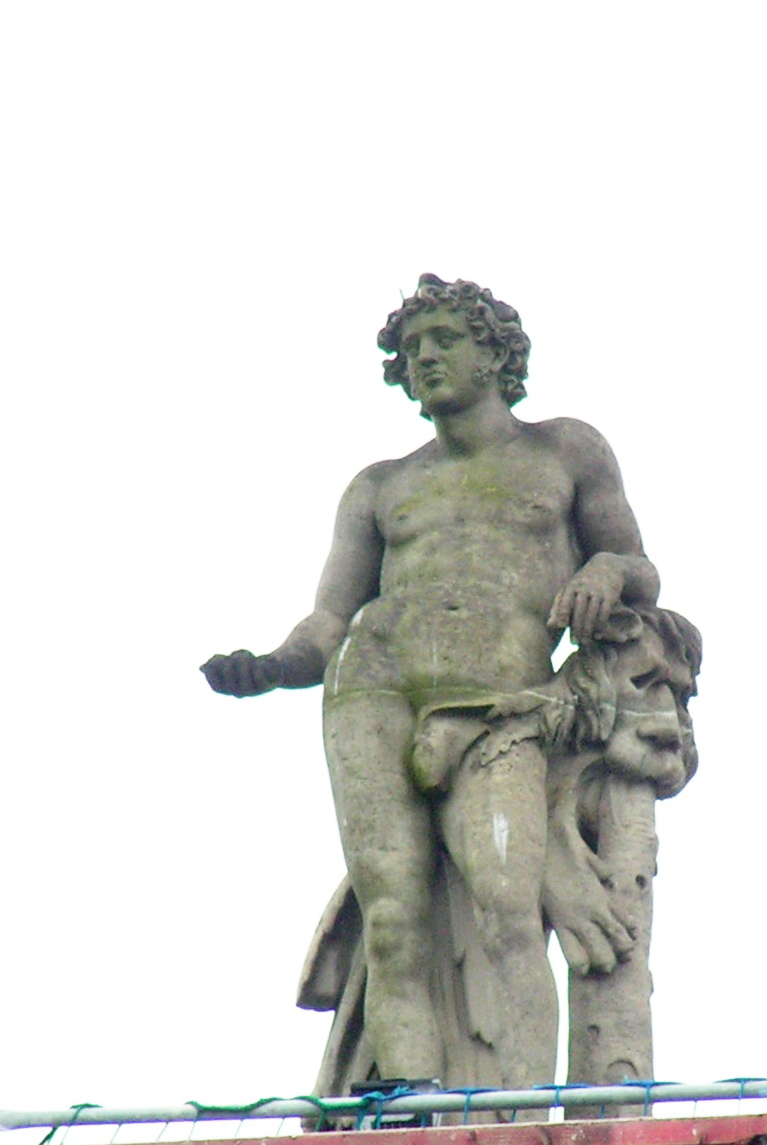
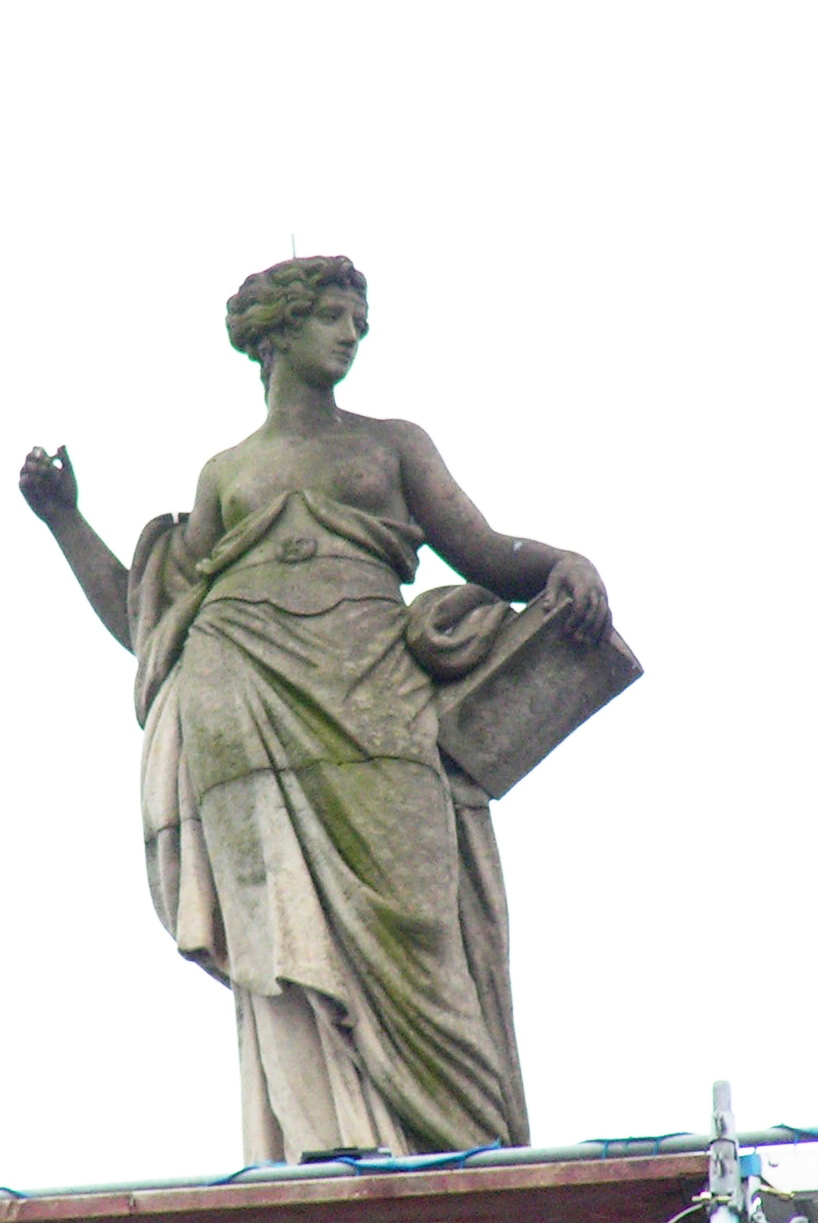
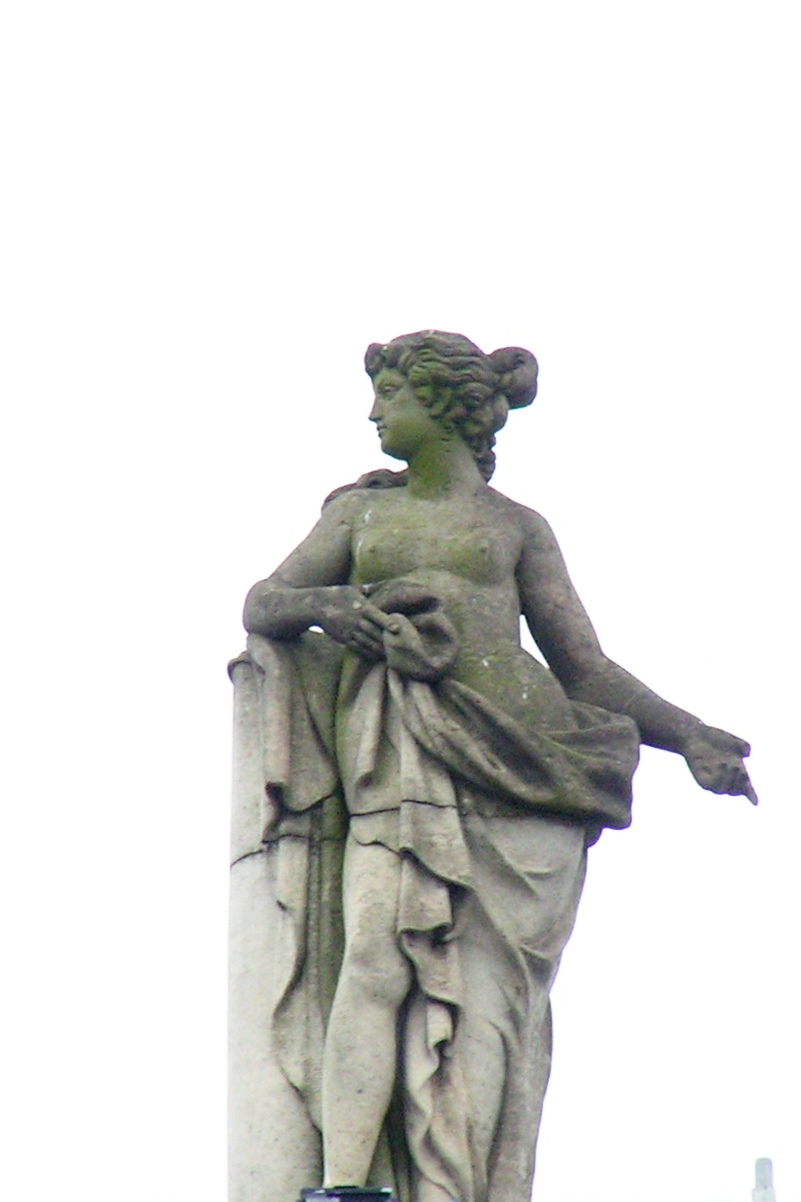
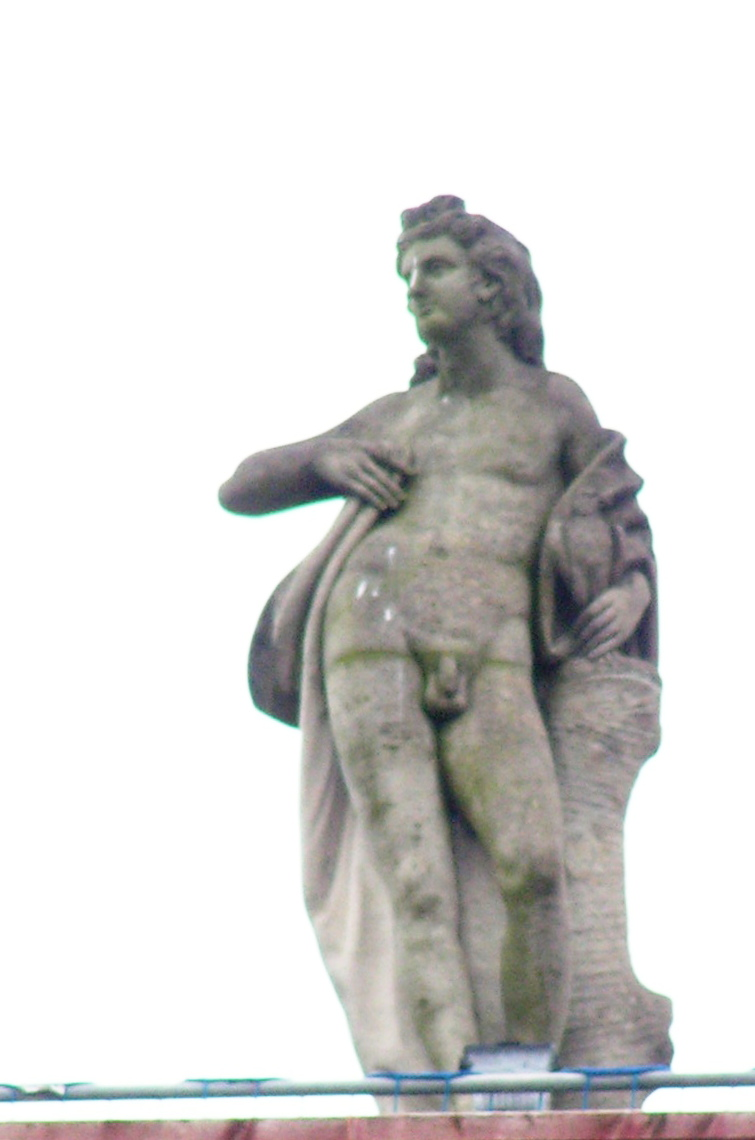
