= The Lonely Tree =

Painting by Caspar David Friedrich

- Der einsame Baum (German)
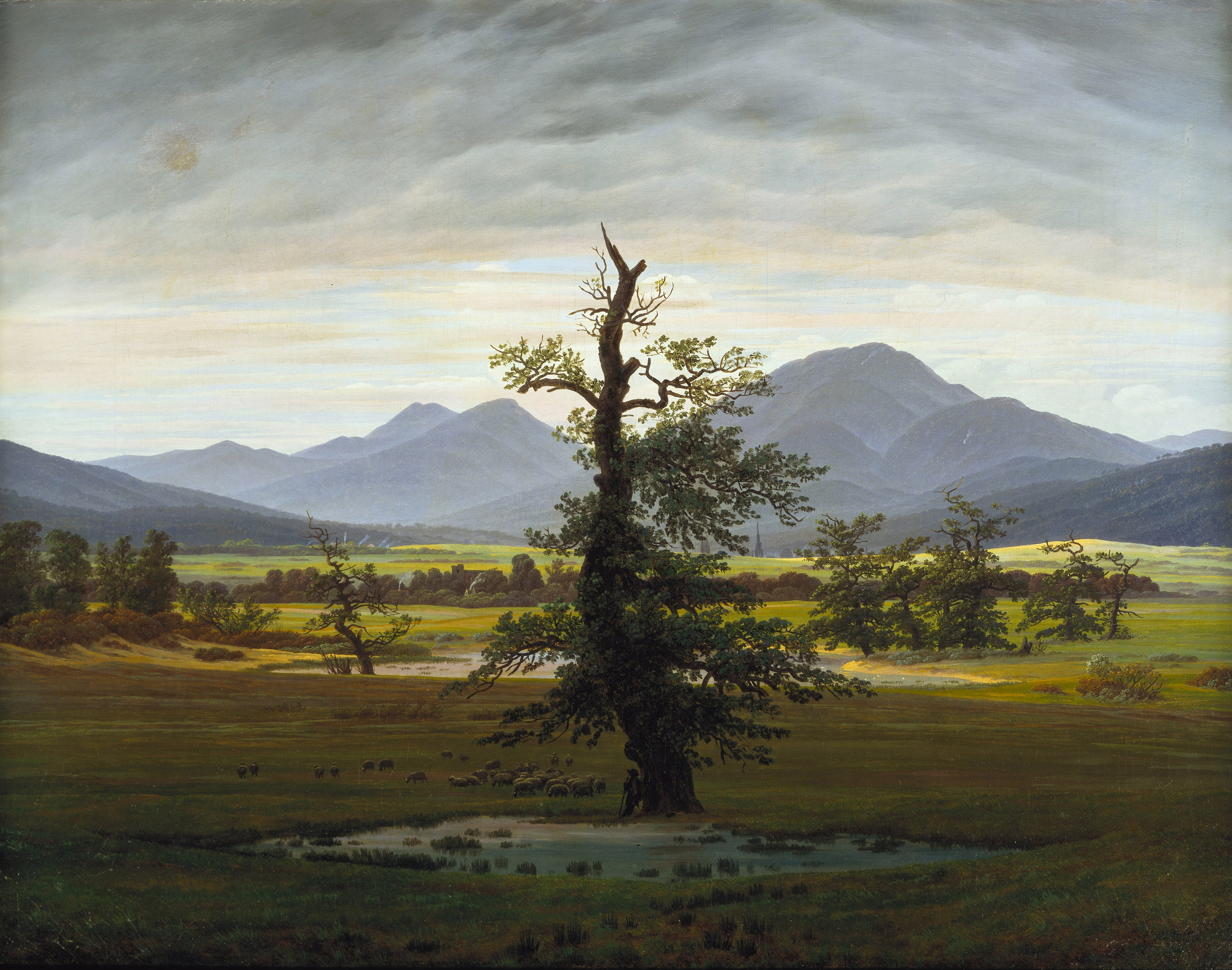
- Artist: Caspar David Friedrich
- Year: 1822
- Medium: Oil on canvas
- Dimensions: 55 cm × 71 cm (22 in × 28 in)
- Location: Alte Nationalgalerie; Berlin

The Lonely Tree (German: Der einsame Baum, sometimes translated as "The Solitary Tree") is an 1822 oil-on-canvas painting by German painter Caspar David Friedrich. It measures 55 × 71 centimetres (22 × 28 in). The work depicts a panoramic view of a romantic landscape of plains with mountains in the background. A solitary oak tree dominates the foreground.

An ancient oak stands at the centre of the painting, clearly damaged but still standing. The tree's branches, dark in silhouette, project into the largely overcast morning sky. Banks of cloud seem to form a dome above the tree. The crown of the tree is dead, and the top of its trunk and two truncated branches resemble a cross. A shepherd shelters under the leaf-bearing lower branches. His flock of sheep graze beside a pond in the wide grassy meadow around the tree. In the middle distance, villages and a town nestle among other trees and bushes. Tree-clad hills pile up into blue-grey mountains in the background.

The work was commissioned by banker and art collector Joachim Heinrich Wilhelm Wagener, together with a second painting Moonrise by the Sea (Mondaufgang am Meer) to create a pair of "times of the day", depicting morning and evening landscape scenes, in a tradition of Claude Lorrain. It was completed before November 1822 and has been held by the Berlin National Gallery since 1861, donated by Wagener as part of its founding collection. It is now in the Alte Nationalgalerie of the Staatliche Museen in Berlin.

Art historian Helmut Börsch-Supan has suggested that the mountains are in the Riesengebirge, now in the Czech Republic, which historically divided Silesia and Bohemia, southeast of Dresden, where Friedrich settled in 1798. Friedrich painted the mountains several times between 1806 and 1810. The double peak may be Jeschken.

The painting has drawn a number of interpretations. Ludwig Justi sees the old oak as a symbol of the German people, rooted in the landscape; Jens Christian Jensen sees it as a link between the past and the present; and Charlotte Margarethe de Prybram-Gladona sees it as a symbol of loneliness.

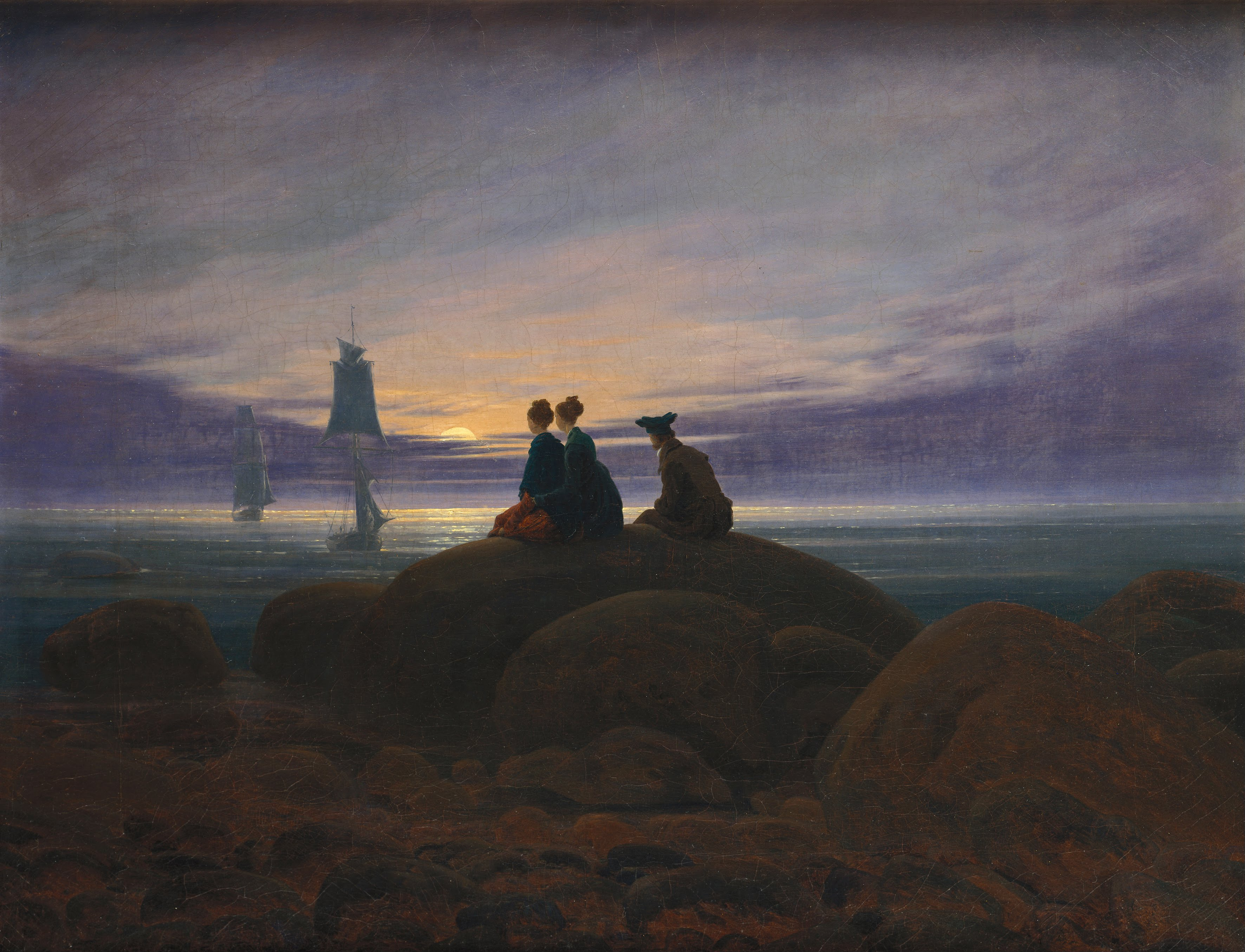
Caspar David Friedrich, Moonrise over the Sea (Mondaufgang am Meer), 1822, Alte Nationalgalerie, Berlin

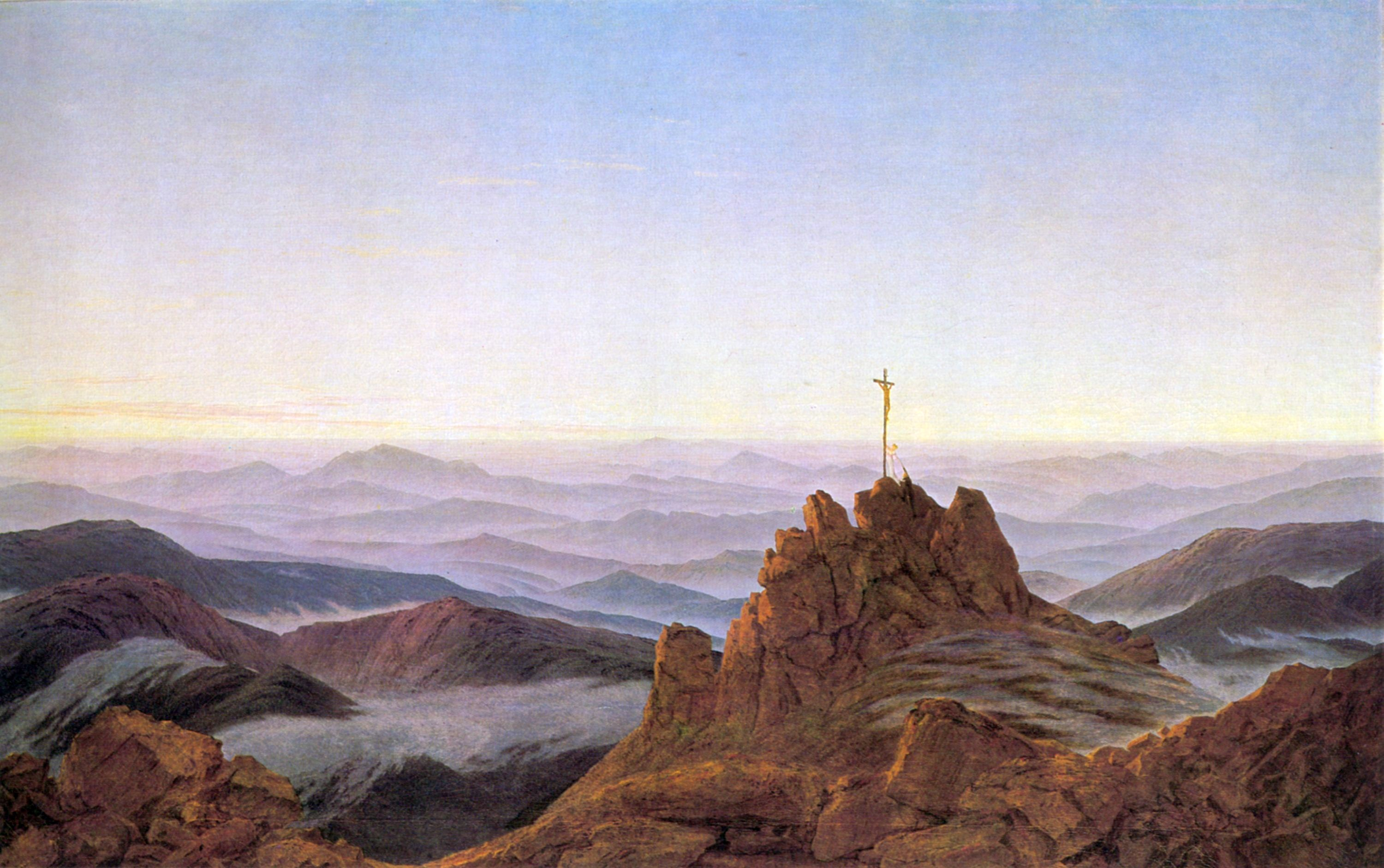
Caspar David Friedrich, Morgen im Riesengebirge, 1810–11

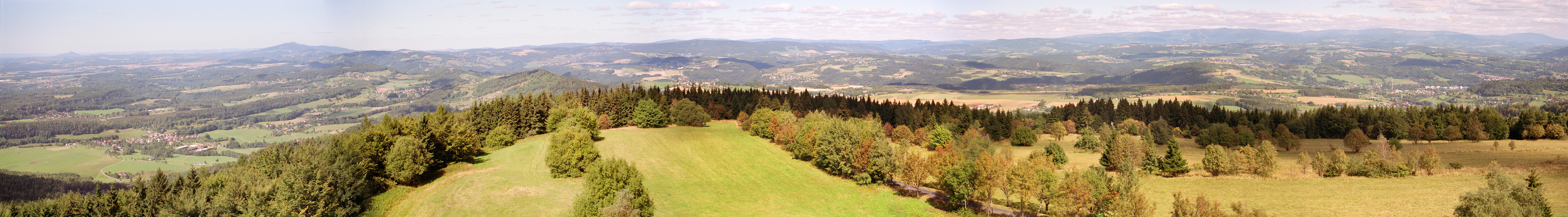
Photograph of the landscape in the Riesengebirge, including a view of Jeschken

== See also ==
- List of works by Caspar David Friedrich
