= Moonrise by the Sea =

1822 painting by Caspar David Friedrich

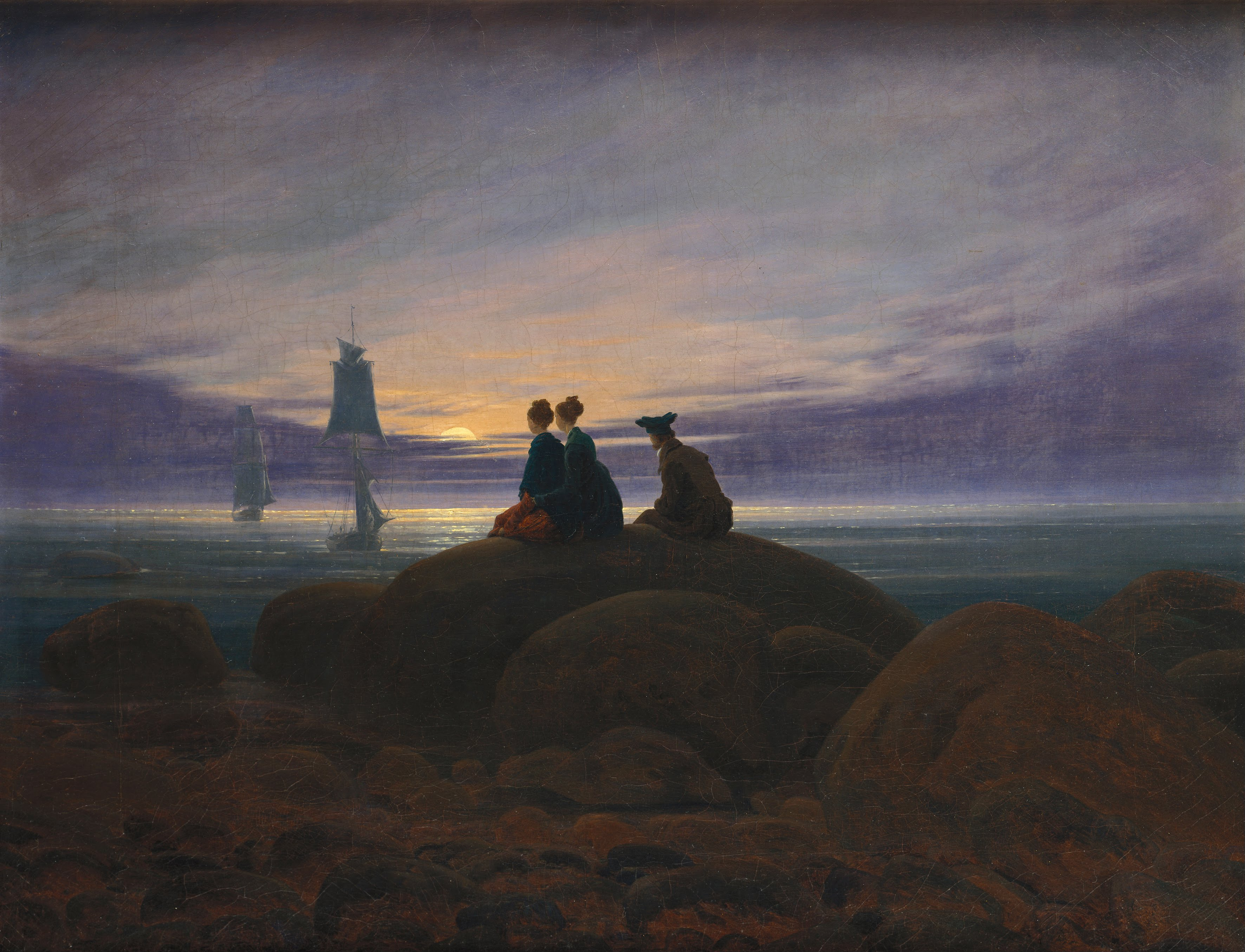
- Artist: Caspar David Friedrich
- Year: 1822
- Medium: oil on canvas
- Dimensions: 55 cm × 71 cm (22 in × 28 in)
- Location: Alte Nationalgalerie; Berlin

Moonrise by the Sea or Moonrise over the Sea (German: Mondaufgang am Meer) is an 1822 oil-on-canvas painting by German painter Caspar David Friedrich. The work depicts a romantic seascape.

Three young people, two women side by side and a man further back, are sitting on a large boulder by the sea, silhouetted against the sky as they watch the moon rising to the east above a band of clouds. In the distance are two sailing vessels, ghosting on a light breeze towards the spectators on the shore. The painting is probably a view of the Baltic Sea, near Friedrich's birthplace in Swedish Pomerania. It may be based on the beach at Stubbenkammer near Rügen.

The work was commissioned by banker and art collector Joachim Heinrich Wilhelm Wagener, together with a second work, The Lonely Tree (Der einsame Baum), to create a pair of "times of the day", depicting morning and evening landscape scenes, in a tradition of Claude Lorrain. It was completed before November 1822 and has been held by the Berlin National Gallery since 1861, donated by Wagener as part of its founding collection. It is now in the Alte Nationalgalerie of the Staatliche Museen in Berlin.

A similarly named but much larger painting from 1821 has been held by the Hermitage Museum in St Petersburg since 1928, and was formerly in the Ropsha Palace, and had been hung in the drawing room of Grand Duke Michael Nikolaevich; it measures 137 × 170 centimetres (54 × 67 in).

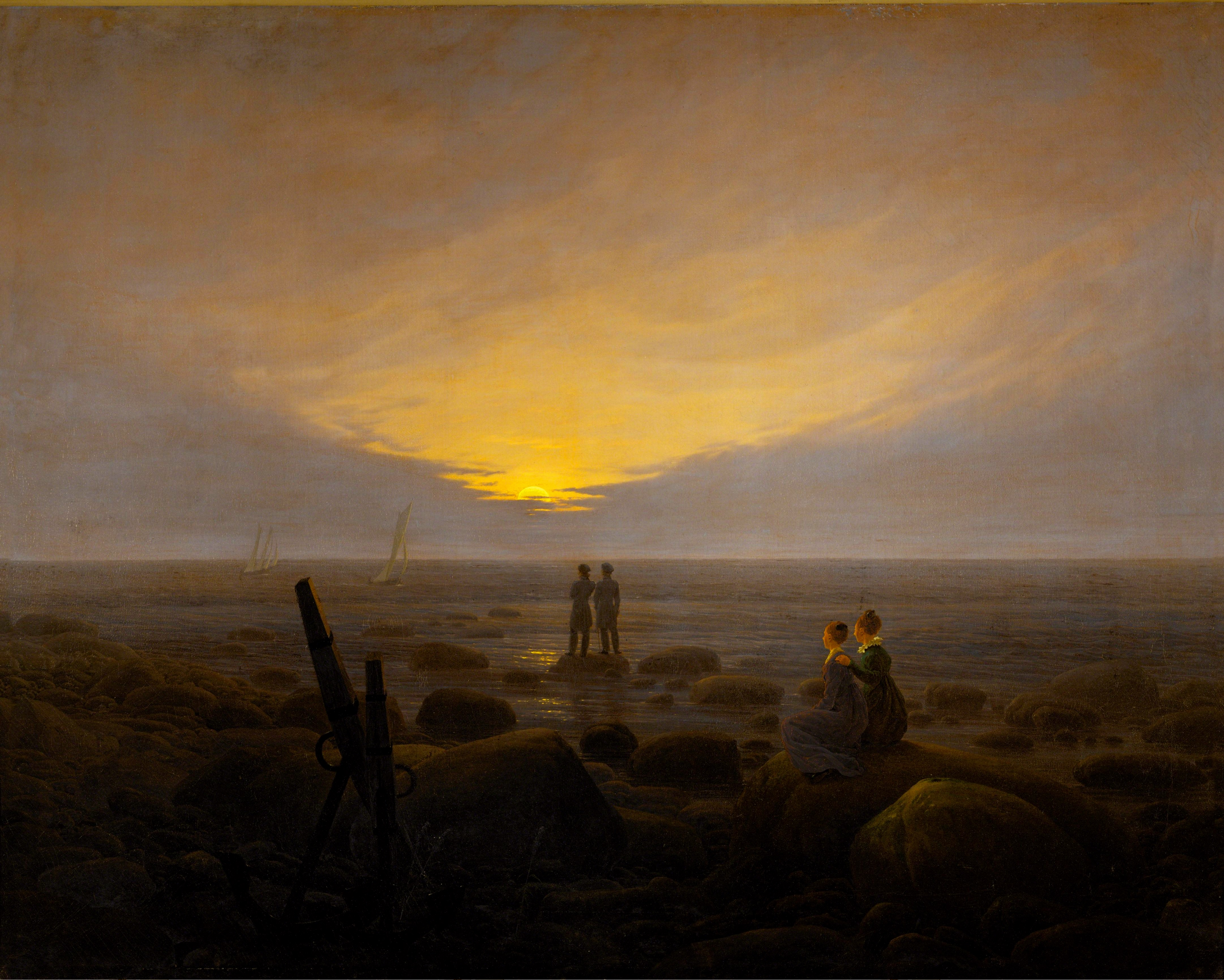
Caspar David Friedrich, Moonrise over the Sea (Mondaufgang am Meer), 1821, Hermitage Museum, St Petersburg

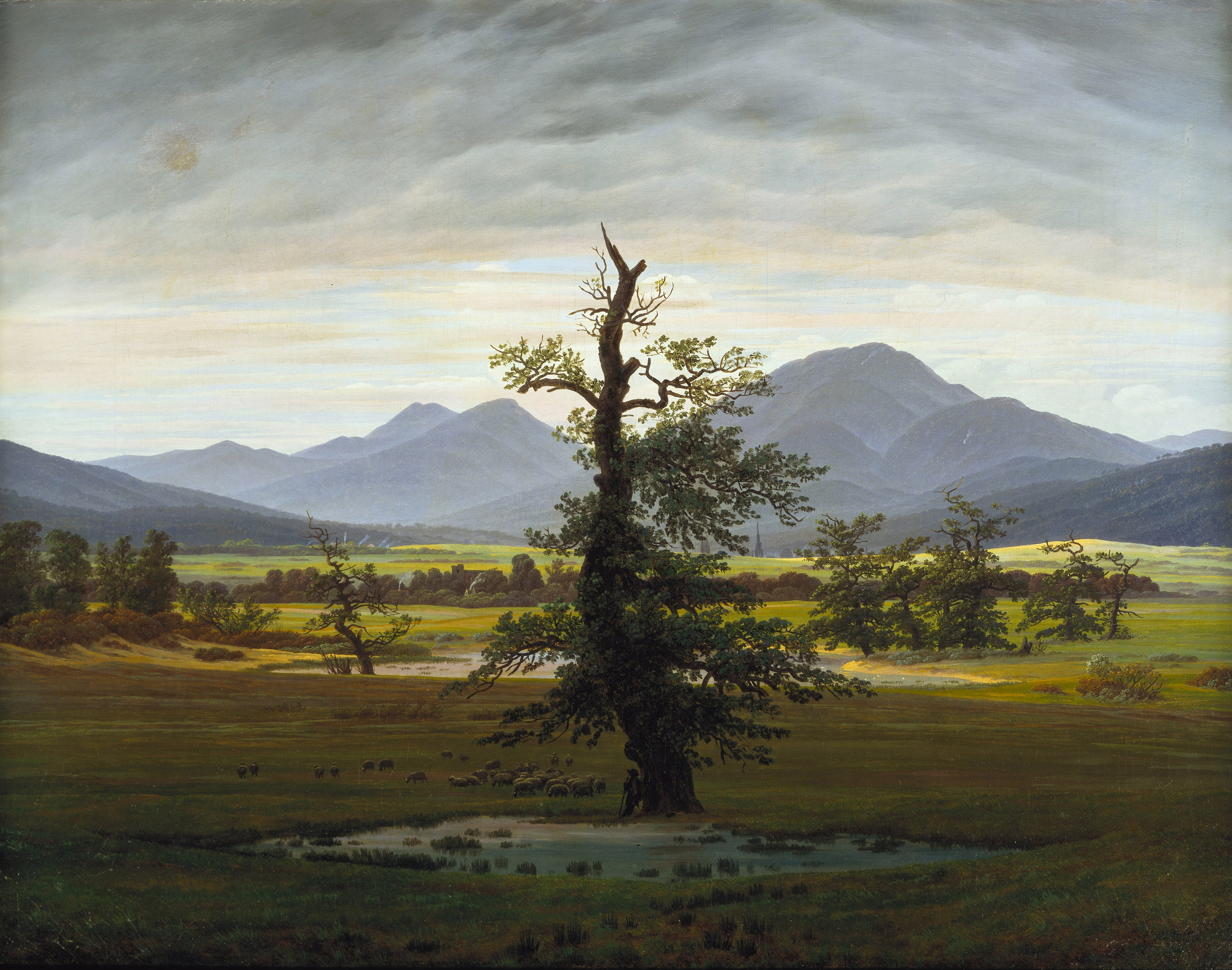
Caspar David Friedrich, The Lonely Tree (Der einsame Baum), 1822, Alte Nationalgalerie, Berlin

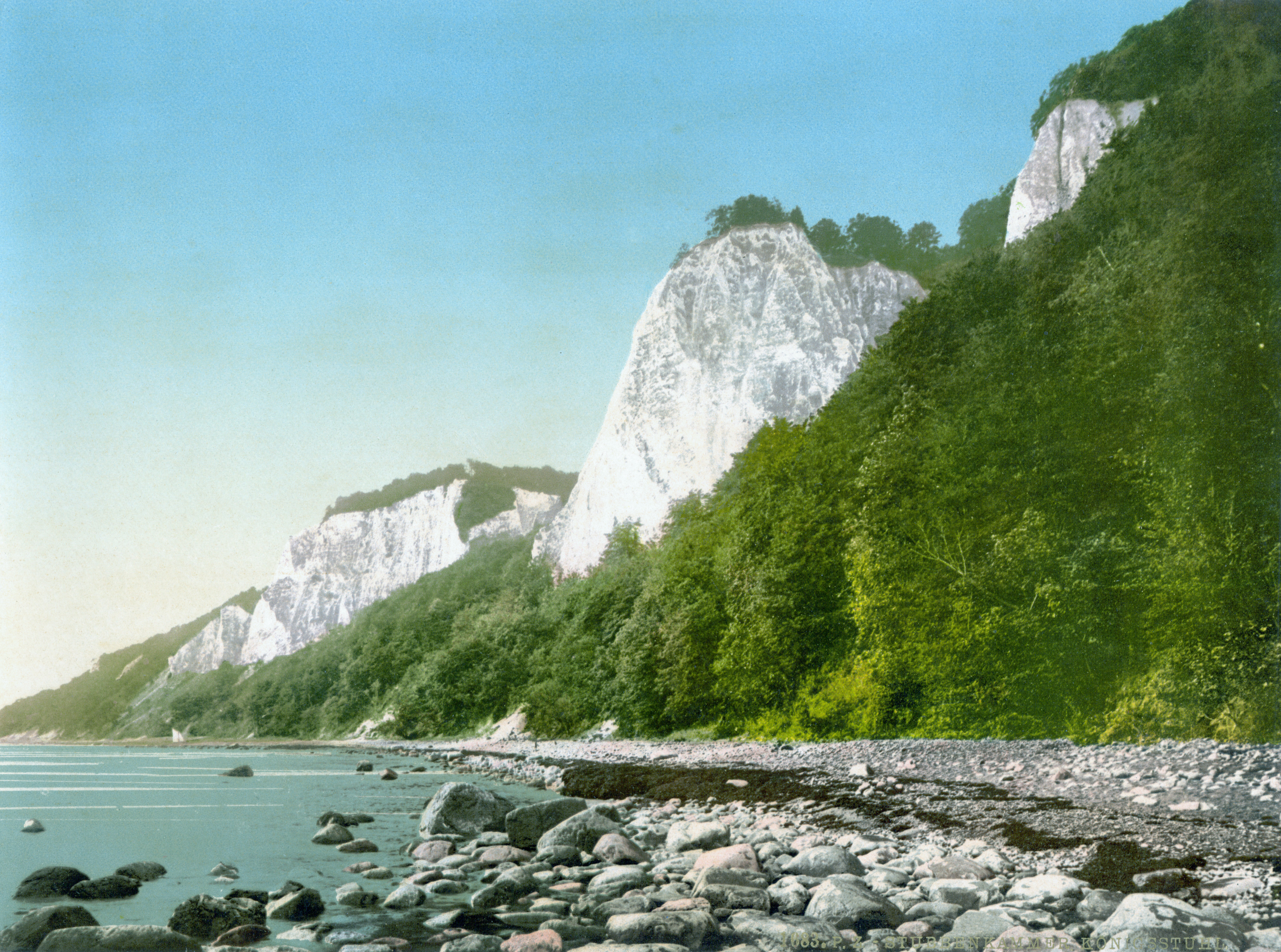
Photograph of the beach at Stubbenkammer in 1900

== See also ==
- List of works by Caspar David Friedrich
