= Country House in Hilversum =

Painting by Max Liebermann

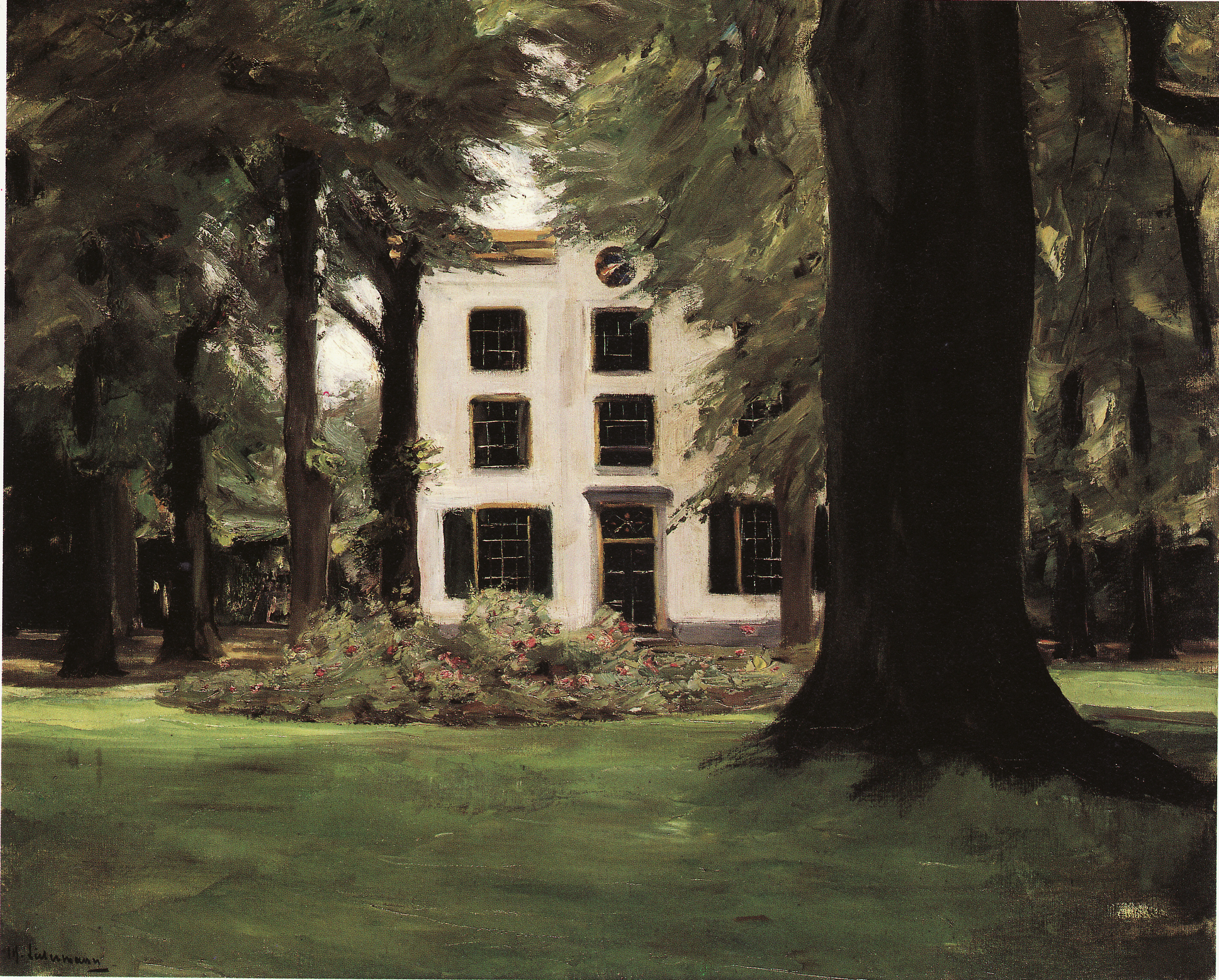
- Artist: Max Liebermann
- Year: 1901
- Medium: oil on canvas
- Dimensions: 65 cm × 80 cm (26 in × 31 in)
- Location: Alte Nationalgalerie, Berlin

Country House in Hilversum is an oil on canvas painting by the German painter Max Liebermann, from 1901. The painting shows a villa in a park near the Dutch town of Hilversum. It is signed "M.Liebermann" at the bottom left. It is part of the collection of the Alte Nationalgalerie, in Berlin.

== History and description ==
The inspiration for this painting was The House at Rueil by Édouard Manet. The current painting marks Liebermann's turn to depictions of the upper-middle-class milieu, after he had previously shown everyday scenes of working people. After this painting, he painted numerous other works of views of villas in the park, especially motifs of his own summer house in the Wannsee.

The painting Country House in Hilversum shows a motif that Liebermann knew from the Dutch province of North Holland. In a park with numerous trees, a white manor house stands in the middle distance. The façade, shown parallel to the picture, is divided into three floors. On the ground floor, in the middle, the viewer can see the entrance door with an ornamented skylight and a short canopy above it. Next to it is a window with open shutters. On the two upper floors there are three windows each without shutters. All of the windows are lattice windows with small panes in a grid. The grid lines shine brightly against the dark rooms inside. The window and door frames are of the yellow colour, while the shutters and the entrance door are painted dark green. A striking design element of the facade is the kind of attic in the middle, in which a round tower clock is set. The reddish tiled roof is visible at the side. Behind it, in some places, a white-grey sky shines through the trees.

In front of the cuboid house there is a large, round rose bed with green foliage and some red flowers. The foreground is a light green lawn. The trees in the park are carefully arranged. From the left and right, rows of trimmed trees extend to the house. Behind them, tree trunks and foliage of other trees can be seen, some of which can only be guessed from their dark shadows. A striking feature, however, is the mighty tree that dominates the foreground on the right side of the painting and contrasts with the white façade of the house. Its thick, dark trunk is trimmed from the upper edge of the painting and only part of the treetop that protrudes behind it appears in the it. Various authors have assumed that the tree depicted here is a beech.

The painting does not feature any human presence. All the windows and doors of the house are locked; neither residents nor servants roam the park. Nevertheless, this "light-flooded space" provides some clues to the owners of the property. The park in its well-kept state is a place of undisturbed peace, which serves for the relaxation of the absent owners. In the painting, Liebermann shows a variety of brushworks.

== Provenance ==
The painting came into the collection of the Nationalgalerie in Berlin in 1917, as a gift from the Berlin entrepreneur, art collector and patron Eduard Arnhold. The occasion was the 70th birthday of Liebermann, with whom Arnhold was a close friend.
