= Carl Busse =

Carl Busse may refer to:

- Carl Busse (architect) (1834–1896), German architect and master builder
- Carl Hermann Busse (1872–1918), German lyric poet
- Carl Busse (actor) in The Prince of Rogues
