= Schloss Britz =

Coordinates: 52°26′49″N 13°26′16″E

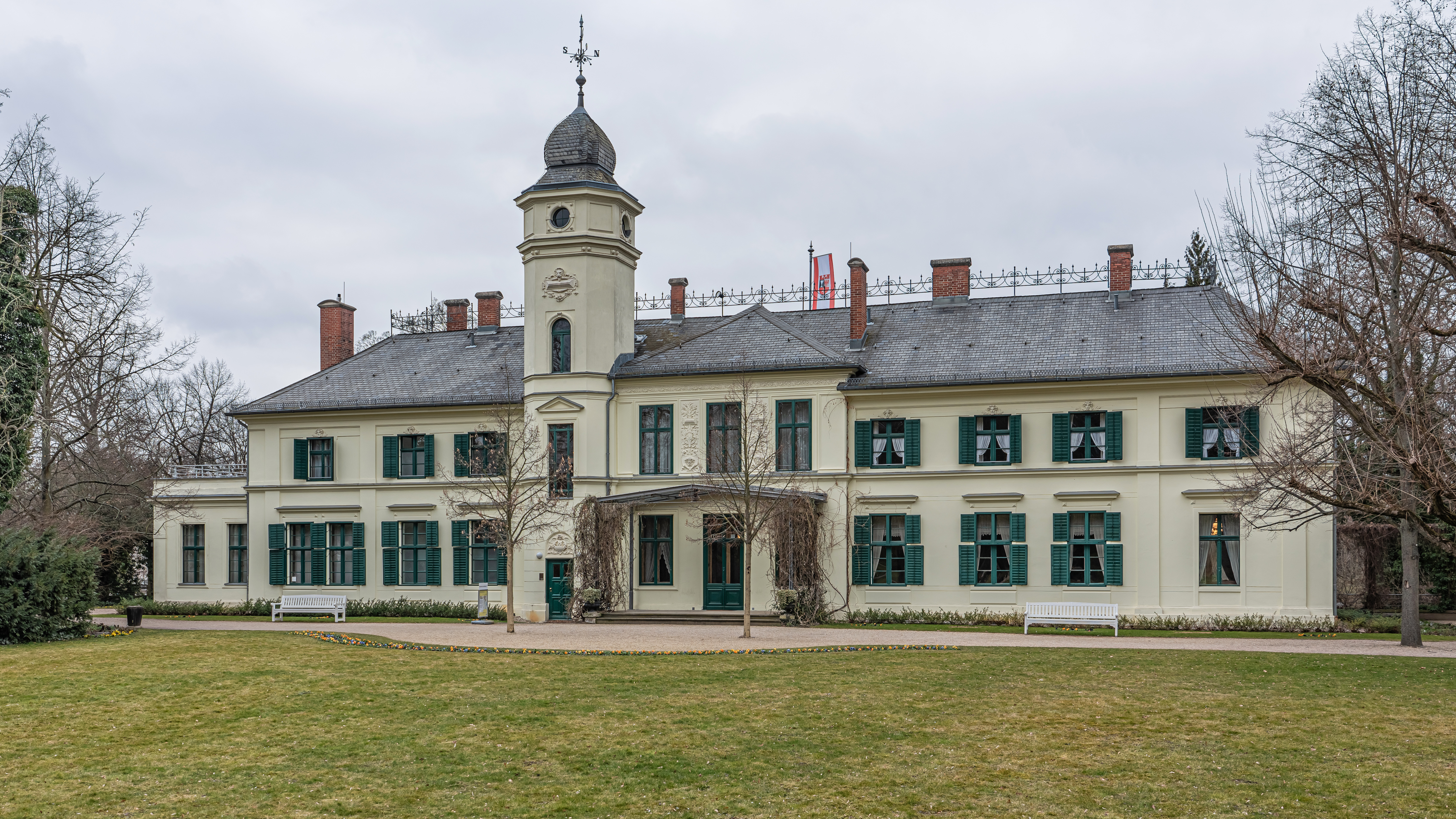
Schloss Britz

Schloss Britz, Berlin

The Schloss Britz (Britz castle) is the former manor-house of the historical Rittergut (country estate) and village Britz, now a district of Berlin-Neukölln. Today it is the headquarters of the cultural organization Kulturstiftung Schloss Britz and includes authentic reconstructed rooms from around 1880. The house is a museum demonstrating interiors of the Gründerzeit era. The manorial park is also well preserved with its mature trees and its 1890s system of trails. In 1997 the park was honored with the German Gustav Meyer Prize for the accuracy and historic authenticity of the reconstruction.

The old farmyard with stables and smithy and the workers' section, with a chimney of a brewery and some storehouses are preserved, too. The final phase of reconstruction will provide space and rooms for further cultural institutions of Berlin-Neukölln in the future.

== History ==
The village Britz is first mentioned in 1373 in the book (Landbuch) of the Mark Brandenburg properties of Kaiser Karl IV (Charles IV, Holy Roman Emperor). Until the end of the 17th century the country estate was the fiefdom of the knight family von Britzke. Due to the devastating consequences of the Thirty Years' War, the family was forced to sell the estate to the Prussian crown in 1699. Later, King Friedrich I (Frederick I of Prussia) awarded his minister Samuel von Chwalkowski with the manor. Around 1706, Chwalkowski finished the new manor stone house, which would be the core of the building, even until now. In 1717, the manor was given the prestigious allodial title. In the 18th century the Britz Manor (Schloss Britz) was in the possession of Heinrich Rüdiger von Ilgen and the count Ewald Friedrich von Hertzberg, and other noble families. Ilgen owned the manor from 1719 until his death 1728 and served as minister for foreign affairs under different Prussian kings. From 1763 to 1791 Hertzberg was a leading minister of the crown cabinet and managed the foreign affairs under Friedrich II. (Frederick II of Prussia) used the estate from 1751 until his death as his country estate. He established one of the first silk farms of Prussia in Britz, and he hired the prominent painter Bernhard Rode to furnish the manor-house with a new décor of frescos and paintings honoring the life of a genteel statesman.

In the 19th century the estate came into the possession of private owners. From 1824 until 1857 the silk trader Johann Carl Jouanne lived in the manor year-round with his family, and rebuilt the whole house to suit his requirements. Nearly all of the older baroque decorations were destroyed and only some paintings of Rode survived. Also around 1840, the buildings of the farmyard were given their present appearance in the style of Italian country mansions following the example of the Bornstedt Crown Estate (Krongut Bornstedt) near Potsdam. Under Jouanne the first brewery was built on the farmyard to produce hard liquor from potatoes (Kartoffelschnaps). From 1880 to 1883 under the last private owner of the manor Wilhelm A. J. Wrede, a trader and producer of sugar and hard liquor, the manor house was given its final and current appearance as a little castle or château in the style of the Neo-Renaissance. The Berlin architect Carl Busse reshaped the house into a representative upper-class home with a new bath, stair tower, and a magnificent new interior in the new styles of the German elite. Today in the rooms of the museum, one can see furniture and objects from this time, like an original lincrusta wallpaper, which is rare in Germany and one of the few remaining Victorian crystal perpetual table fountains produced by J. Defries & Sons in London .

In 1924, the entire estate was sold to the city of Berlin. After World War II, the Schloss Britz served as a refugee house and from the 1950s on as a children's home. In 1971 the manor house and later the park and the remaining farmyard buildings were declared historic monuments and after the renovation from 1985 to 1988, the manor house was opened to the public for the first time. Ever since, the manor house has hosted many cultural events and has also served as a guest house for the borough office of Neukölln.

== The Park ==
The 1.8 ha park of the manor stands out as an example of the three hundred continuous history of the Schloss Britz. In the early 18th century, the park was a typical baroque park, following the example of the Netherlands that combine elements of a fruit and vegetable garden with that of a pleasure garden. The central colonnade of lime trees still exists. Like the manor-house, the park was given its modern appearance with the winding path system, exotic potted plants and a fountain in the last decade of the 19th century. The mature Ginkgo tree deserves mention as one of the oldest ones in Germany and was probably planted in the early 19th century. The visitor can find also in the park a bust of the former owner Heinrich Rüdiger von Ilgen. It is a copy of a sculpture which was made in 1902 by Rudolf Siemering for the Siegesallee (Victory Avenue).

== Milkmaid ==
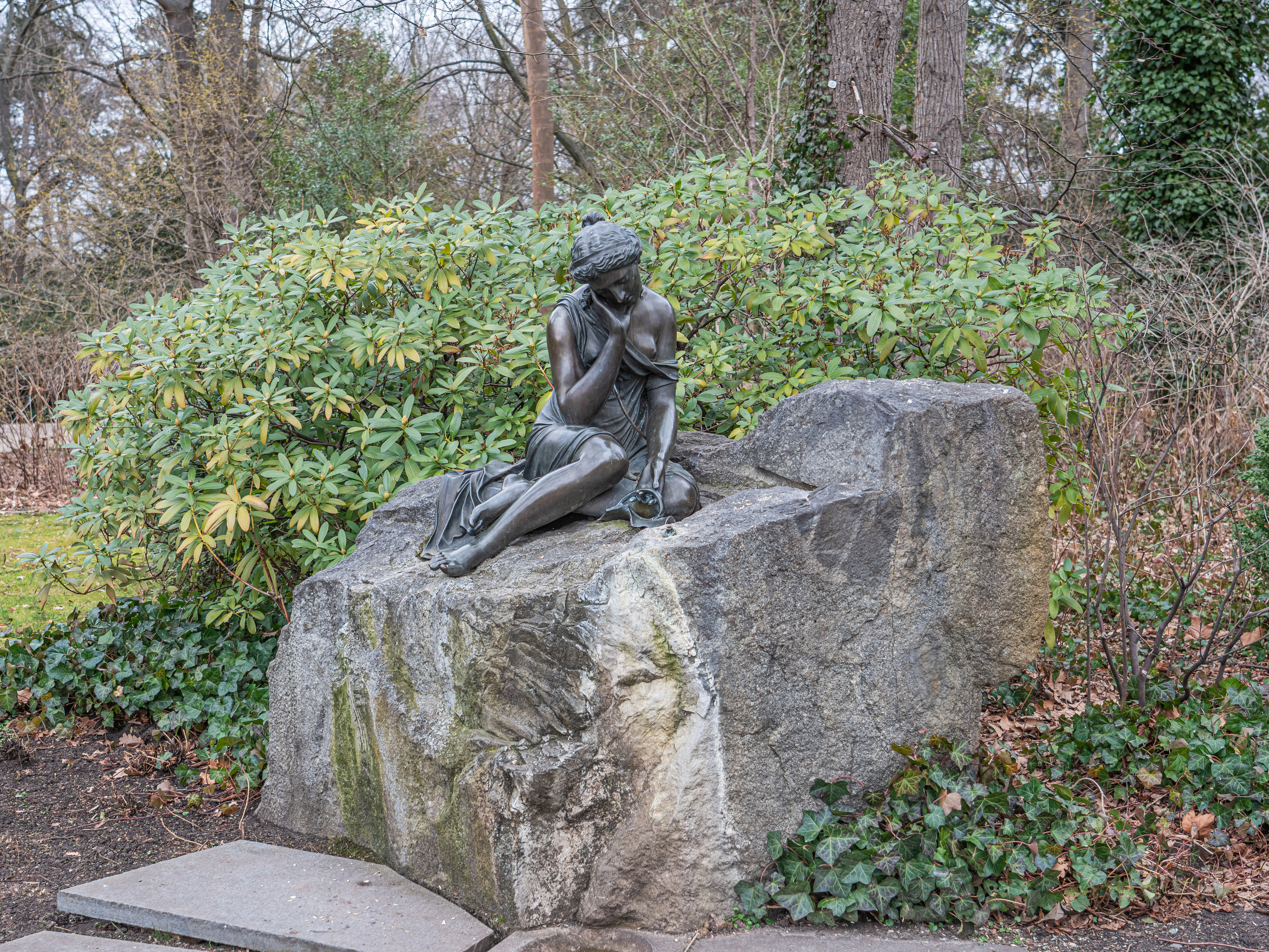
The milkmaid is mourning over the lost milk

The park contains a bronze copy of a neo-classical sculpture made by Pavel Sokolov which he created originally in 1816 for the park of the Catherine Palace in Tsarskoye Selo, near Saint Petersburg. It is called The Milkmaid. The copy was donated in 1998 to Schloss Britz celebrating the anniversary of ten years of partnership between the Kulturstiftung Schloss Britz and the State Museums of Tsarskoye Selo. The sculpture depicts a crying girl with a broken milk jug, from the French fable Le pot à lait (The Milk Pan) from the 17th century writer Jean de La Fontaine. This fable was transferred into a German version Die Milchfrau (The Milkmaid) by the author Johann Wilhelm Ludwig Gleim in the 18th century.

The fable reflects upon the futility of daydreams without recognizing reality or the facts. A milkmaid was on the way to the market with a jug full of milk and was making great plans for the money she would earn for the milk. Lost in her daydreams of future pleasures and fortunes, she missed a step and dropped the pot, which cracked on the ground and all the milk and future plans were spilled, leaving her with nothing but sadness. In Germany this has become a common saying, known as the Milchmädchenrechnung meaning one who daydreams naïvely and forms false conclusions.

== Bibliography ==
- Matthias Barth: Herrenhäuser und Landsitze in Brandenburg und Berlin. Von der Renaissance bis zum Jugendstil. Würzburg 2008, S. 26–29. ISBN 978-3-87057-292-1
- Anton F. Büsching: Beschreibung seiner Reise von Berlin über Potsdam nach Rekahn unweit Brandenburg, welche er vom 3. bis 8 Junius 1775 gethan hat. Frankfurt und Leipzig 1780.
- Freunde und Förderer Schloss Britz e. V. (Hrsg.): 300 Jahre Schloss Britz. Ewald Friedrich Graf von Hertzberg und die Berliner Aufklärung. Berlin 2006. ISBN 978-3-00-018846-6.
- Kulturstiftung Schloss Britz / Freunde und Förderer Schloss Britz e. V. (Hrsg.): Der Garten zu Britz. Seine Entwicklungsgeschichte von den Anfängen bis heute. Berlin 1998.
- Friedrich Nicolai: Beschreibung der königlichen Residenzstädte Berlin und Potsdam, aller daselbst befindlicher Merkwürdigkeiten und der umliegenden Gegend. Berlin 1786.
