= Alte Nationalgalerie =

Art museum in Berlin, Germany

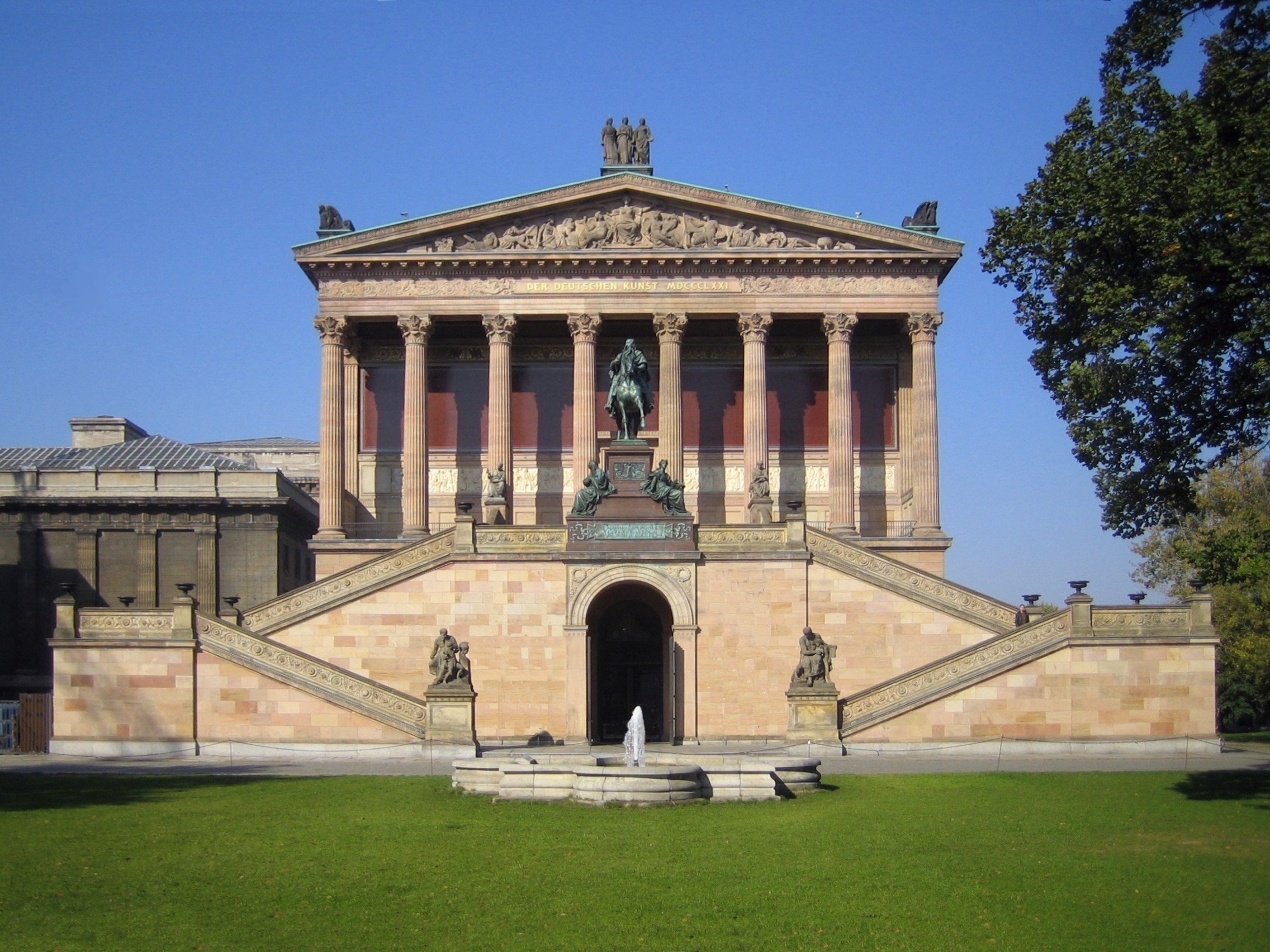
- Front façade of the Alte Nationalgalerie
- Interactive fullscreen map
- Established: 1876
- Location: Museum Island, Berlin
- Coordinates: 52°31′15″N 13°23′53″E
- Type: Art museum
- Public transit access: U: Museumsinsel
- Website: Alte Nationalgalerie

UNESCO World Heritage Site
- Part of: Museumsinsel (Museum Island), Berlin
- Criteria: Cultural: ii, iv
- Reference: 896
- Inscription: 1999 (23rd Session)
- Area: 8.6 ha (21 acres)
- Buffer zone: 22.5 ha (56 acres)

The Alte Nationalgalerie (lit. Old National Gallery) is a listed building on the Museum Island in the historic centre of Berlin, Germany. The gallery was built from 1862 to 1876 by the order of King Frederick William IV of Prussia according to plans by Friedrich August Stüler and Johann Heinrich Strack in Neoclassical and Renaissance Revival styles. The building's outside stair features a memorial to Frederick William IV. Currently, the Alte Nationalgalerie is home to paintings and sculptures of the 19th century and hosts a variety of tourist buses daily. As part of the Museum Island complex, the gallery was inscribed on the UNESCO World Heritage List in 1999 for its outstanding architecture and its testimony to the development of museums and galleries as a cultural phenomenon in the late 19th century.

== History ==
=== Founding ===
The first impetus to founding a national gallery came in 1815. The idea gained momentum during the 1830s, but without an actual building. In 1841 the first real plans were created. These plans never made it out of the planning stages, but finally in 1861 the National Gallery was founded, after banker Johann Heinrich Wagener donated 262 paintings by both German and foreign artists. This donation formed the basis of the current collection. The collection was first known as Wagenersche und Nationalgalerie (Wagener and National Gallery) and was housed in the buildings of the Akademie der Künste. The current building, shaped like a Roman temple with an appended apse, was designed by Friedrich August Stüler and after his death, realised in detail under Carl Busse.

=== Building and related developments ===
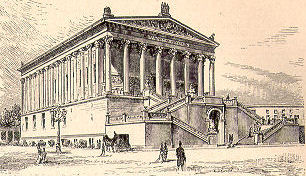
Picture of the Alte Nationalgalerie from Heinrich August Pierer's Universal-Lexikon, 1891

Friedrich August Stüler began working on a design for the building in 1863, based on a sketch by King Frederick William IV of Prussia. Two years and two failed plans later, his third proposal was finally accepted. Stüler died before planning was completed and Carl Busse handled the remaining details in 1865. In 1866, by order of the king and his cabinet, the Kommission für den Bau der Nationalgalerie (Commission for the construction of the national gallery) was created. Ground was broken in 1867 under the supervision of Heinrich Strack. In 1872 the structure was completed and interior work began. The opening took place on 22 March 1876, in the presence of the Kaiser.

Because of the building's modern construction using brick and iron, it was widely believed to be fireproof. The exterior and outer staircase were constructed of Triassic sandstone from Nebra. At the opening the collection was still relatively small. Next to Wagener's collection, originally, was a display of cartoons by Peter von Cornelius that had been bequeathed to the Prussian government. The initial objective of the gallery was to collect contemporary, primarily Prussian art, as Berlin did not then have any repository of modern art.

In 1874 Max Jordan became the first director of the National Gallery. In 1896 he was succeeded by Hugo von Tschudi, who acquired Impressionist works, risking conflict with the Kaiser because this ended the collection's focus on German art. The German National Gallery thus became the most important museum for modern French Art at the turn of the century.

=== 20th century ===
In 1909, Ludwig Justi assumed the post of director, and added Expressionist works to the collection. Following the German Revolution of 1918–19 that ended Imperial rule, he moved the modern art to the Kronprinzenpalais at the end of Unter den Linden, which became known as National Gallery II.

In 1933, the new Nazi authorities dismissed Justi, who was followed by Eberhard Hanfstaengl. He remained until 1937, when he too was dismissed. His successor, Paul Ortwin Rave, remained until 1950, although because of World War II the building was closed during much of that time. It was heavily damaged in Allied air raids. It was partly reopened in 1949, but reconstruction continued until 1969. Between 1998 and 2001, the museum was renovated thoroughly by German architect HG Merz. Some extra halls were added on the uppermost floor and now contain the Romantic works. The three-year, $62 million renovation of the Alte Nationalgalerie was part of a refurbishment of Museum Island and the energetic effort by government and private institutions to re-establish Berlin as Germany's political and cultural heart.

== Architecture ==
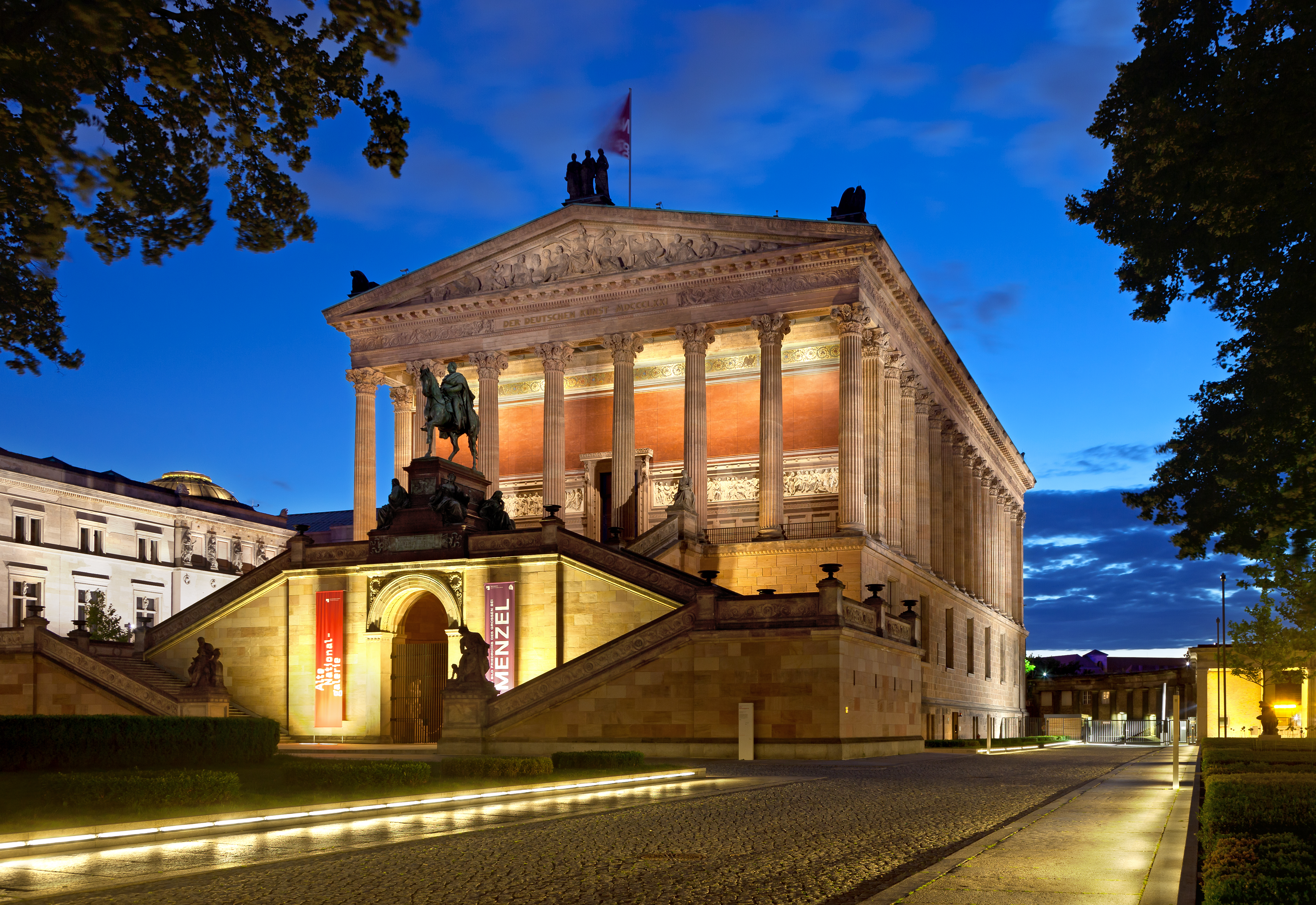
Alte Nationalgalerie

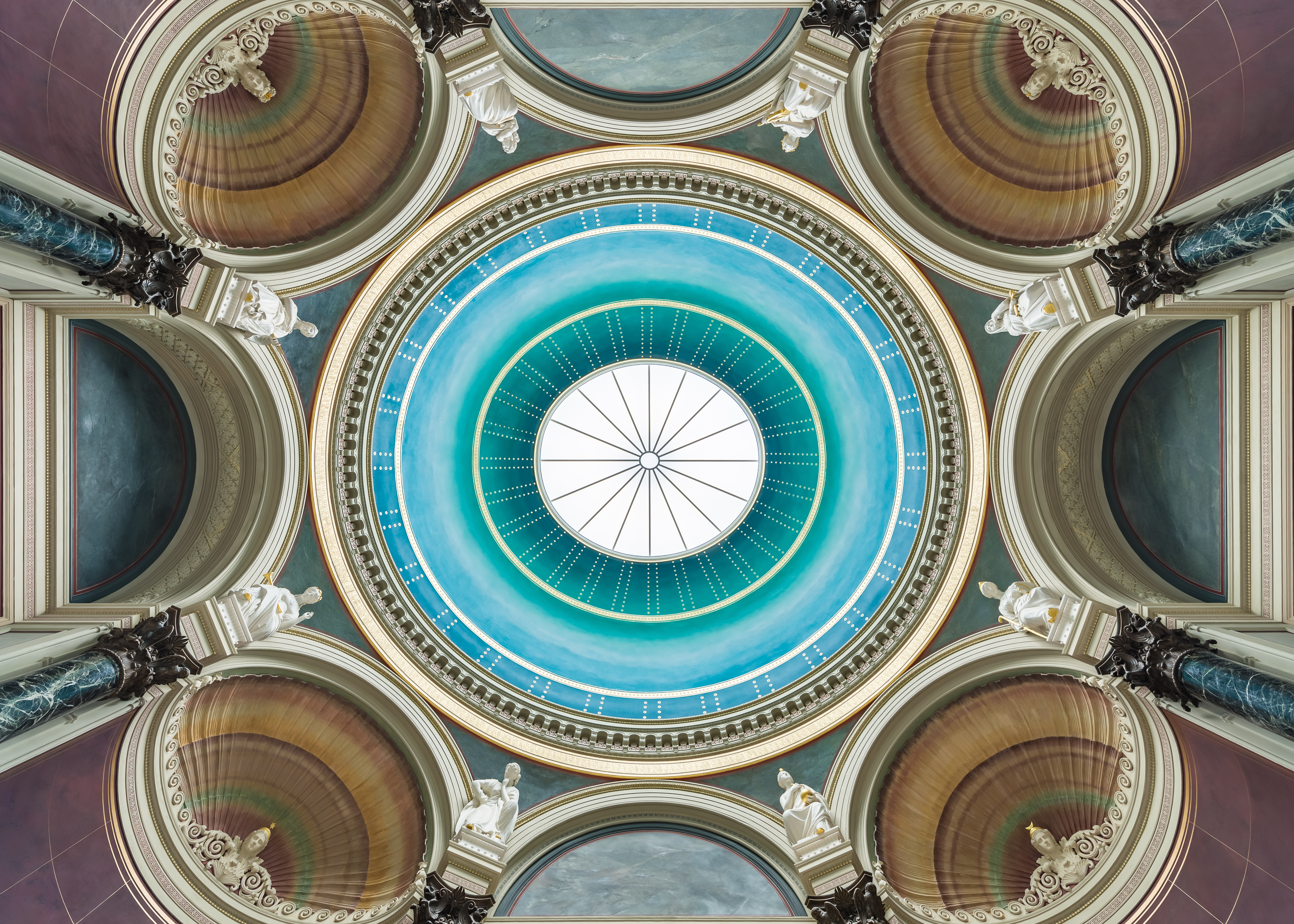
Dome on the second floor

The Alte Nationalgalerie, together with the Altes Museum, the Neues Museum, the Bode Museum, the Pergamon Museum, the Berlin Cathedral and the Lustgarten, make up the Museum Island complex in Berlin. It is situated in the middle of the island, between the rails of the Berlin Stadtbahn and Bode Street on the eastern banks.

It is connected to the Pergamon Museum to the north, and to the Neues Museum, the Altes Museum, and the Berlin Cathedral to the south. The building was designed by Friedrich August Stüler with details by Carl Busse, in an architectural style that is a mix between late Classicism and early Neo-Renaissance, and realised by Heinrich Strack. It was intended to express "the unity of art, nation, and history", and therefore has aspects reminiscent of a church (an apse) and a theatre (the grand staircase) as well as a temple. An equestrian statue of Frederick William IV tops the stairs, and the inside stairs have a frieze by Otto Geyer depicting German history from prehistoric times to the 19th century. The exterior of the building still retains its original appearance, whereas the interior has been renovated many times in order to suit the exhibits.

== Collection ==
The collection contains works of the Neoclassical and Romantic movements (by artists such as Caspar David Friedrich, Karl Friedrich Schinkel, and Karl Blechen), of the Biedermeier, French Impressionism (such as Édouard Manet and Claude Monet) and early Modernism (including Adolph von Menzel, Max Liebermann and Lovis Corinth). Among the most important exhibits are Friedrich's Der Mönch am Meer (The Monk by the Sea), von Menzel's Eisenwalzwerk (The Iron Rolling Mill) and sculptor Johann Gottfried Schadow's Prinzessinnengruppe, a double statue of princesses Louise of Mecklenburg-Strelitz and Frederica of Prussia.

The Alte Nationalgalerie houses one of the largest collections of 19th-century sculptures and paintings in Germany. In addition, it belongs to the Berlin National Gallery, which in turn is part of the Staatliche Museen zu Berlin. It is the original building of the National Gallery, whose holdings are now housed in several additional buildings.

In October 2021 the Alte Nationalgalerie restituted the Camille Pissarro painting A Square in La Roche-Guyon (1867) to the heirs of Armand Dorville, a French Jewish art collector whose family was persecuted by the Nazis and whose paintings had been sold at a 1942 auction in Nice that was overseen by the Commissariat Général aux Questions Juives. The museum then purchased the Pissarro back.

== Gallery ==
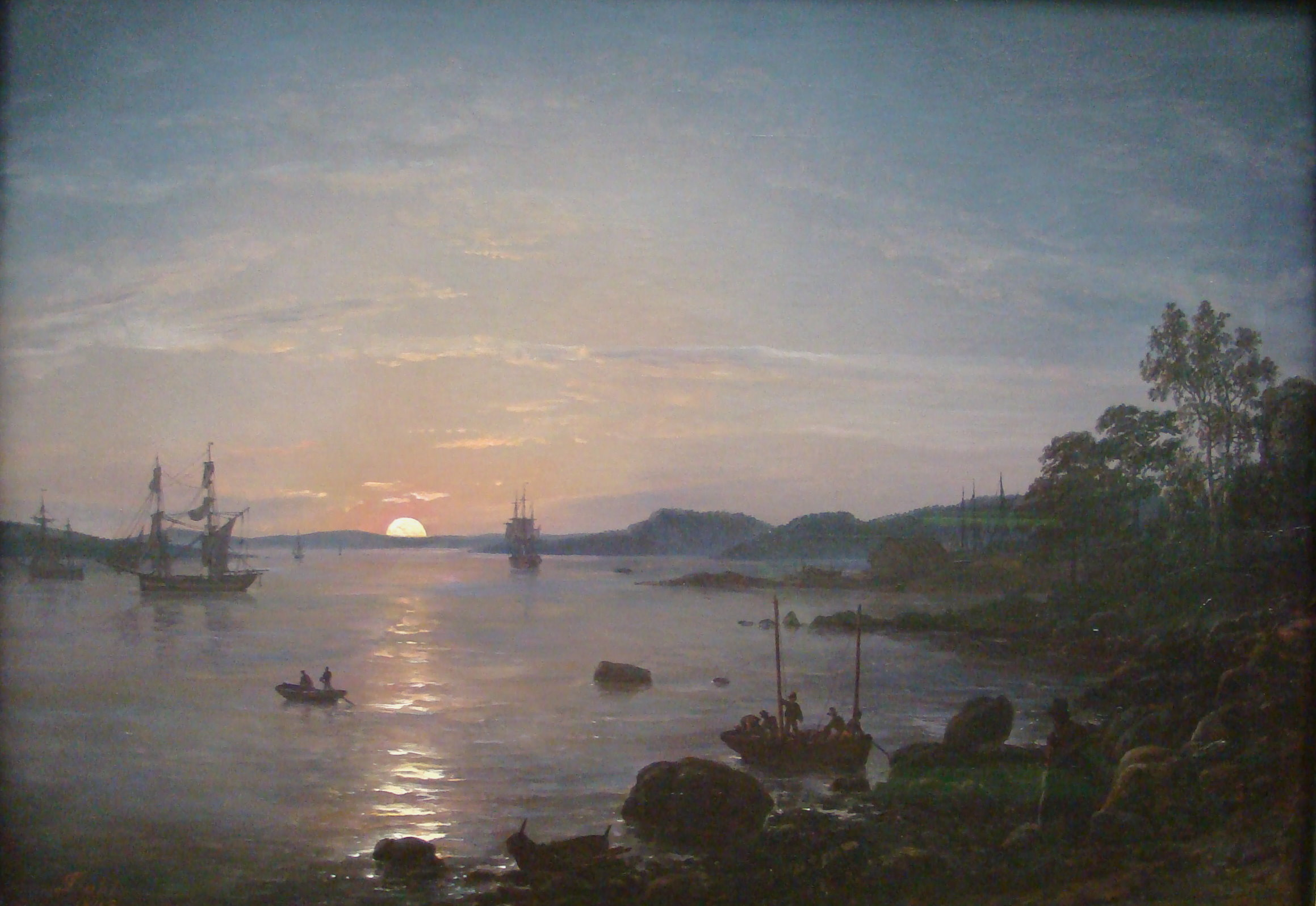
Fjord at Holmestrand, Johan Christian Dahl, 1843

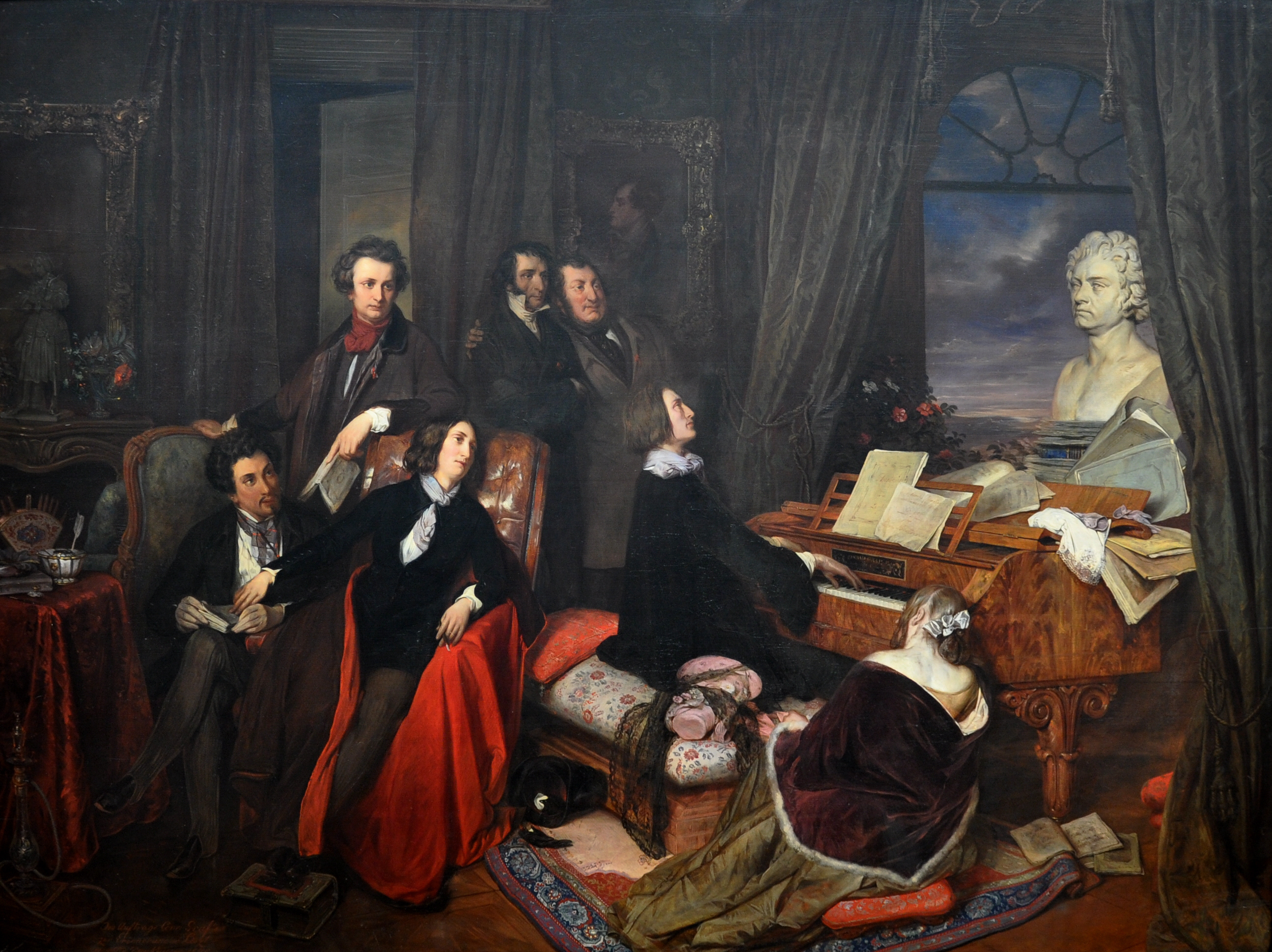
Liszt at the Piano, Josef Danhauser, 1840

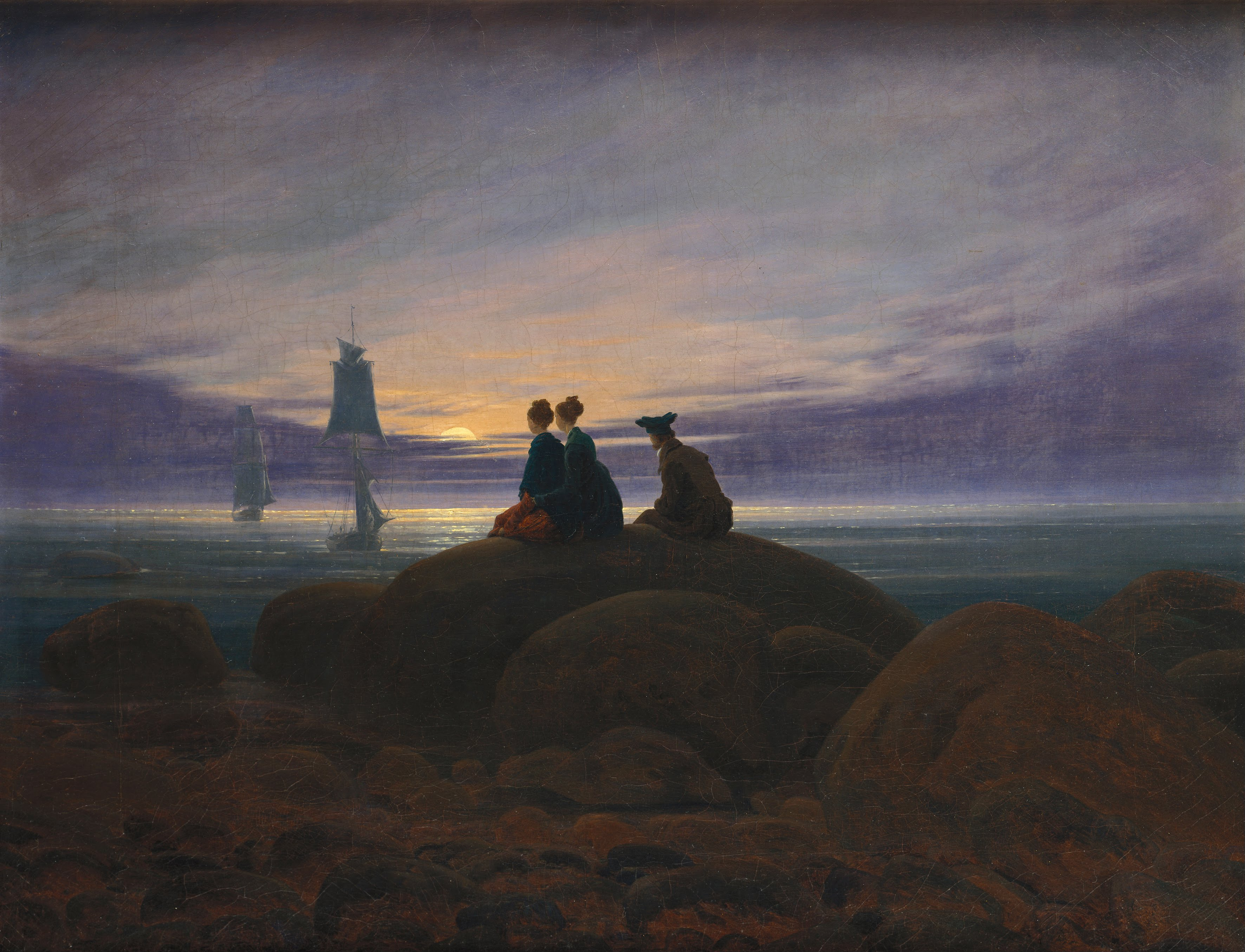
Moonrise at the Ocean, Caspar David Friedrich, 1822

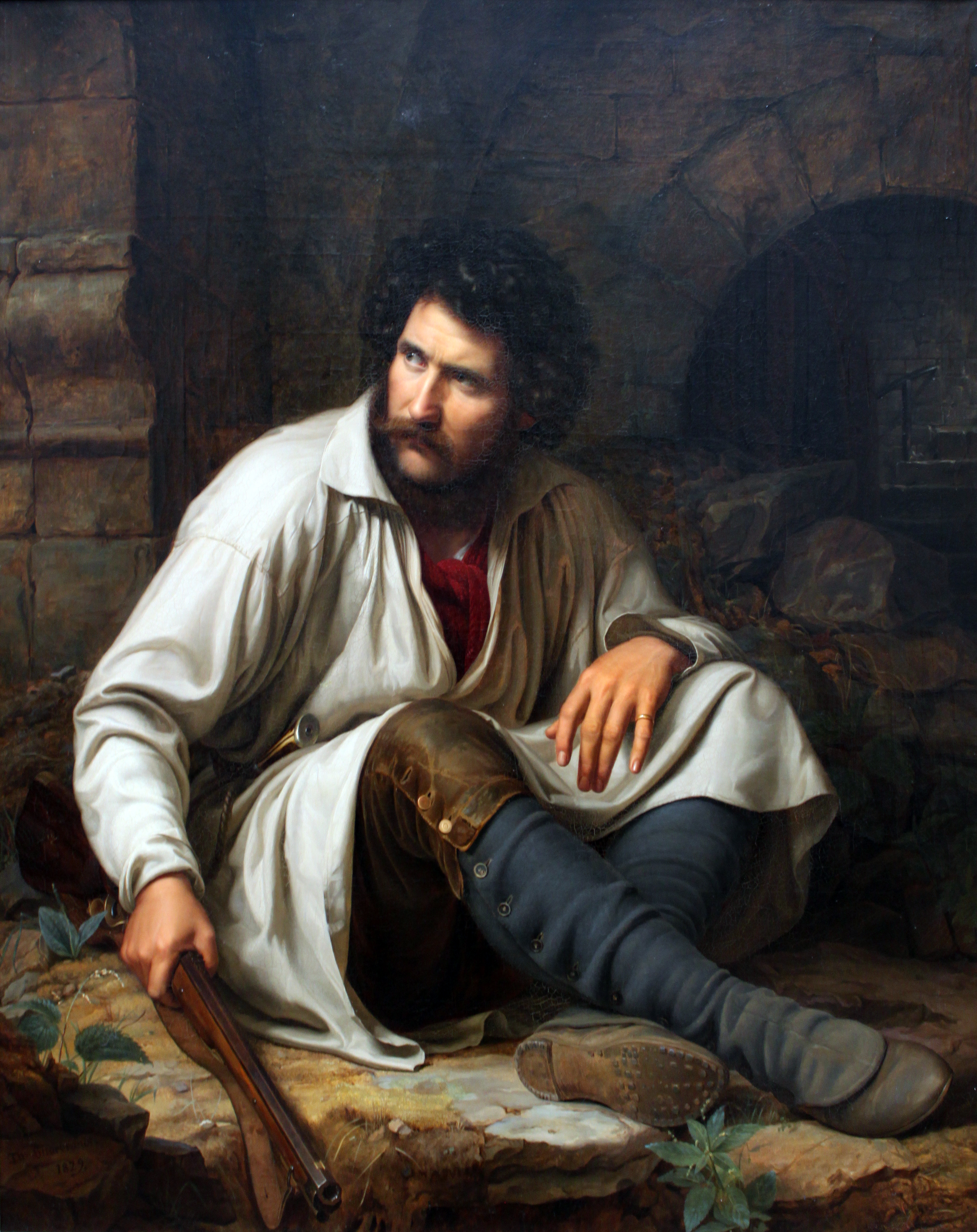
The Robber, Theodor Hildebrandt, 1829

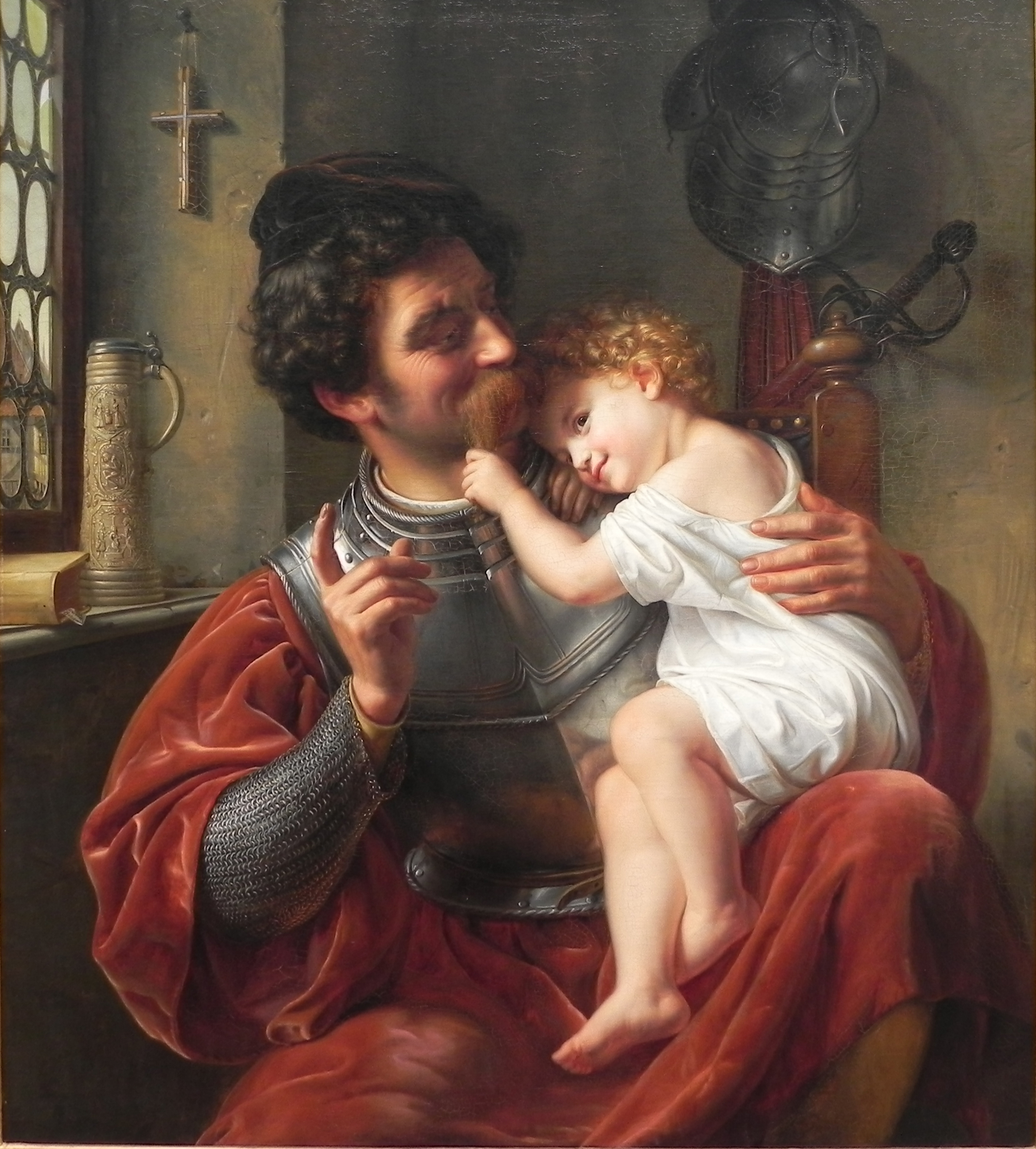
The Warrior and his Child, Theodor Hildebrandt, 1832

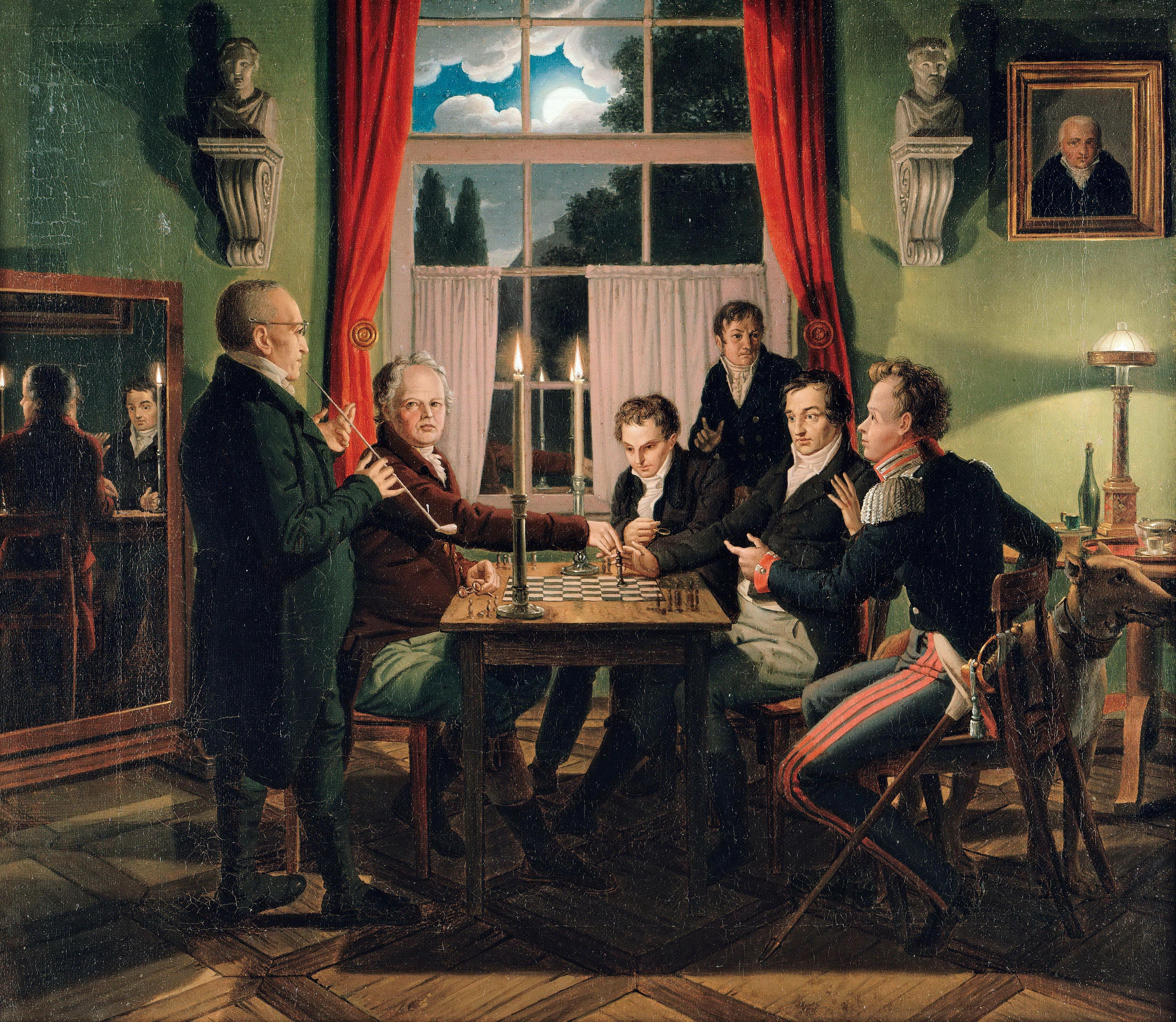
Chess Game, Johann Erdmann Hummel, 1819

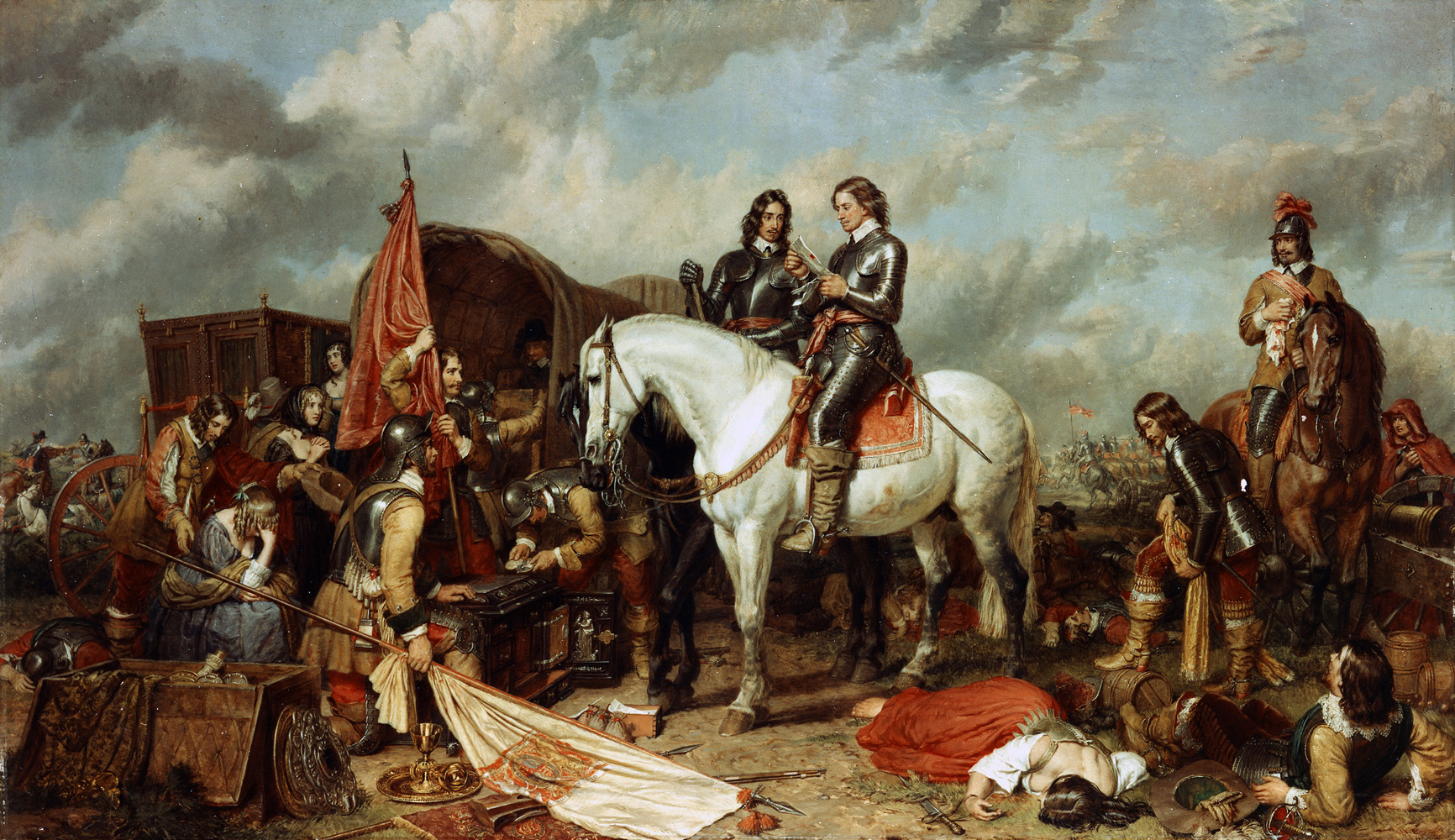
Cromwell at the Battle of Naseby, Charles Landseer, 1851

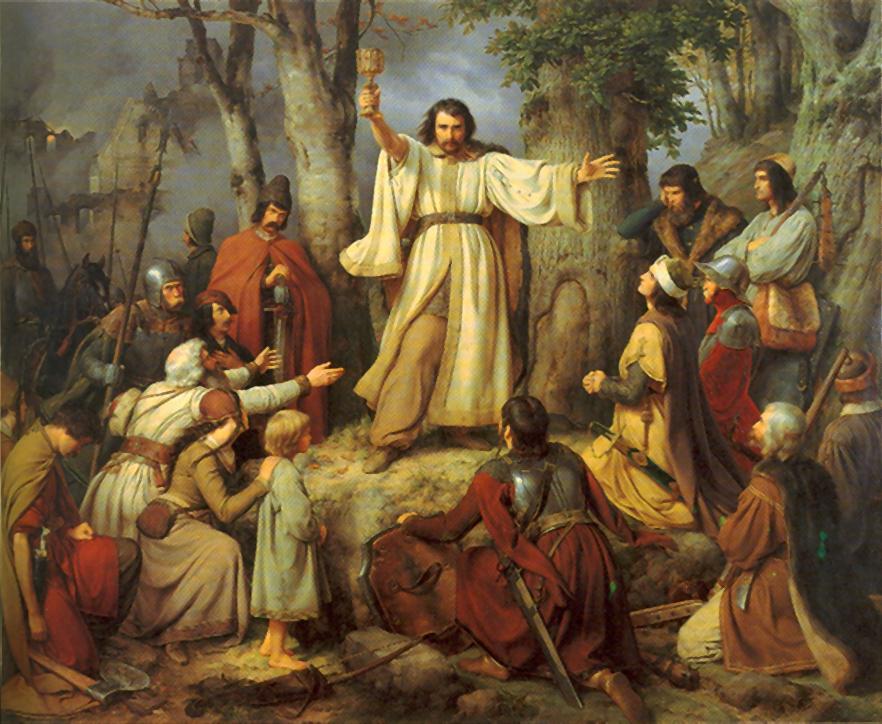
The Hussite Sermon, Karl Friedrich Lessing, 1836

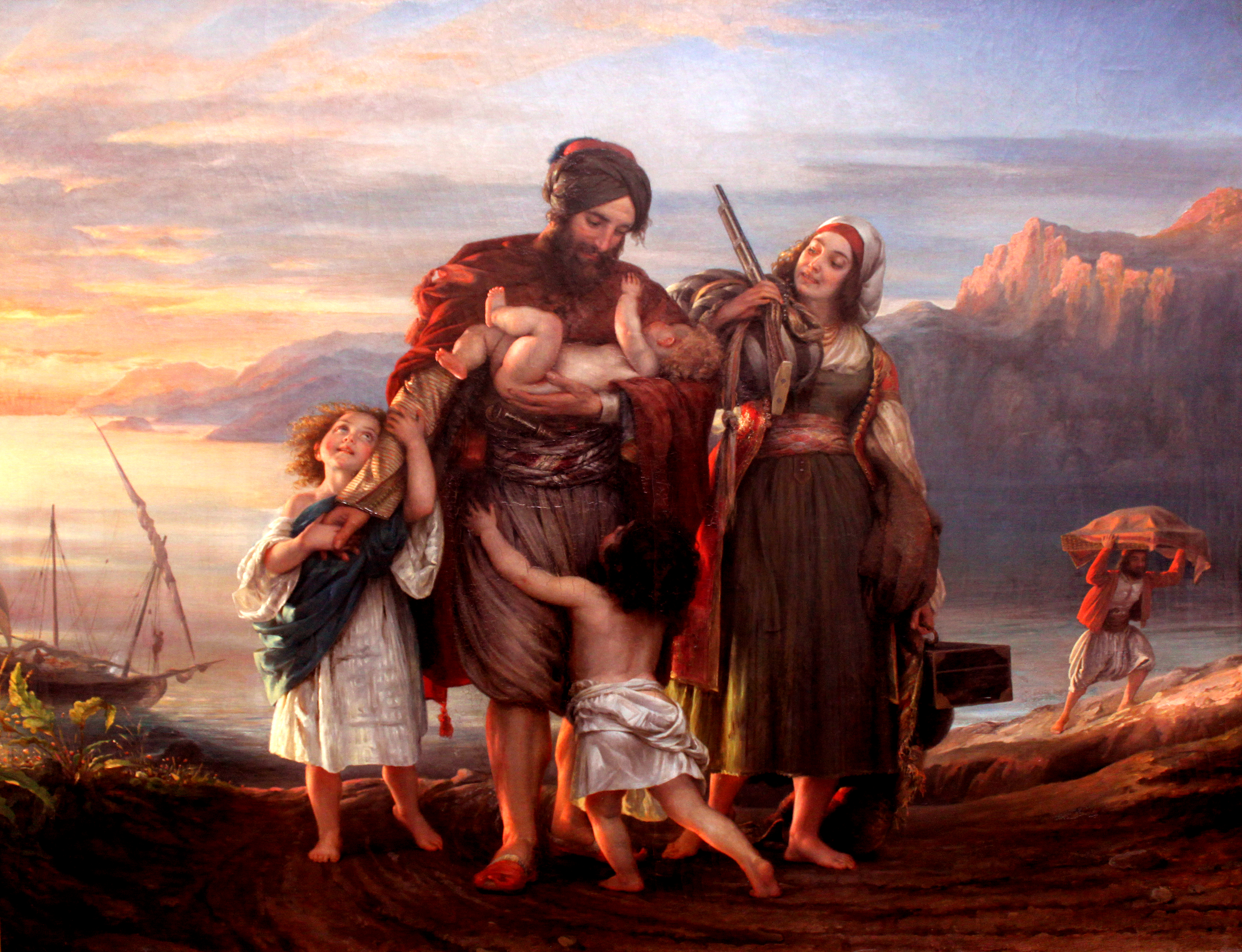
Return of the Palikar, Eduard Magnus, 1836

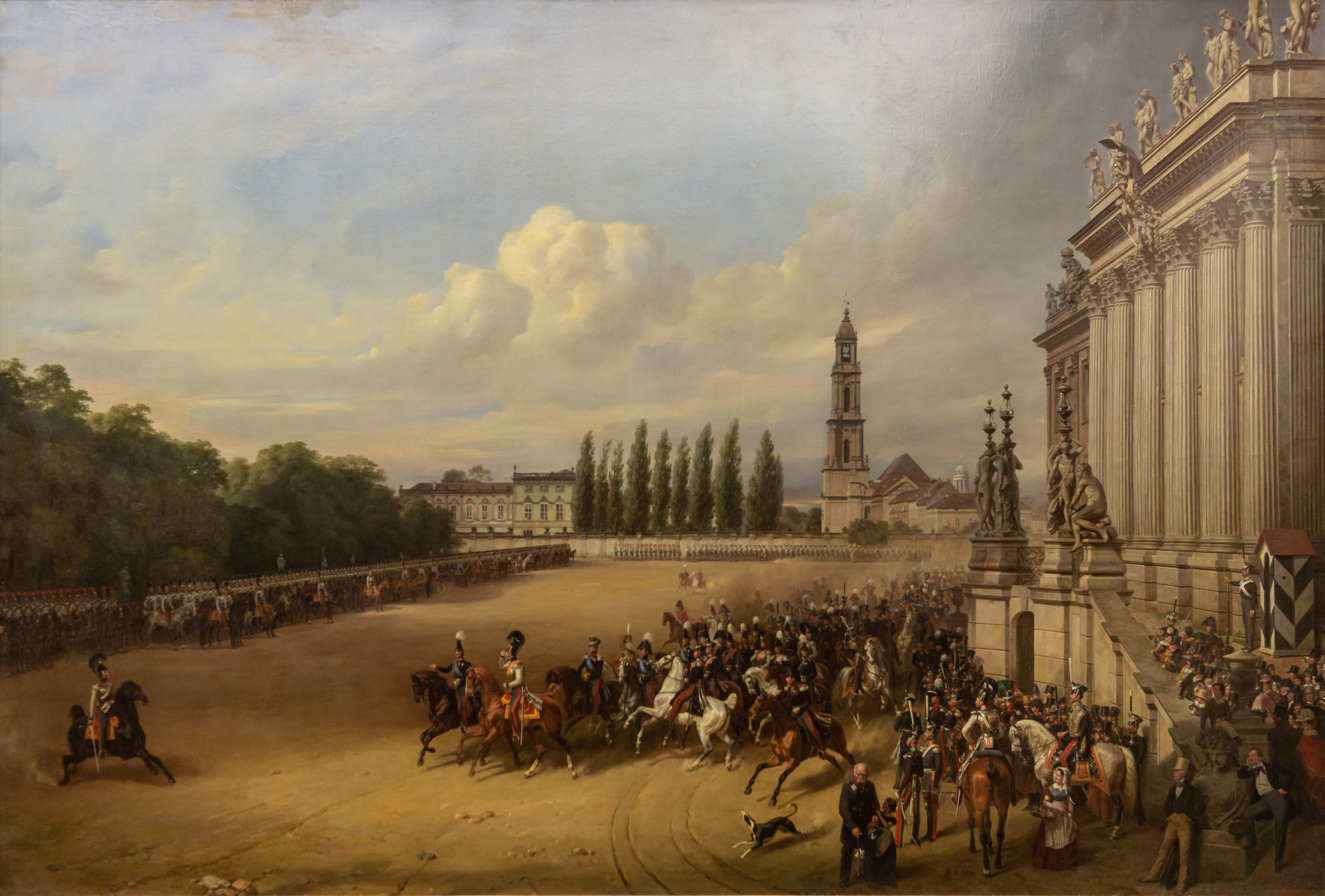
Parade in Potsdam in 1817, by Franz Krüger, 1849

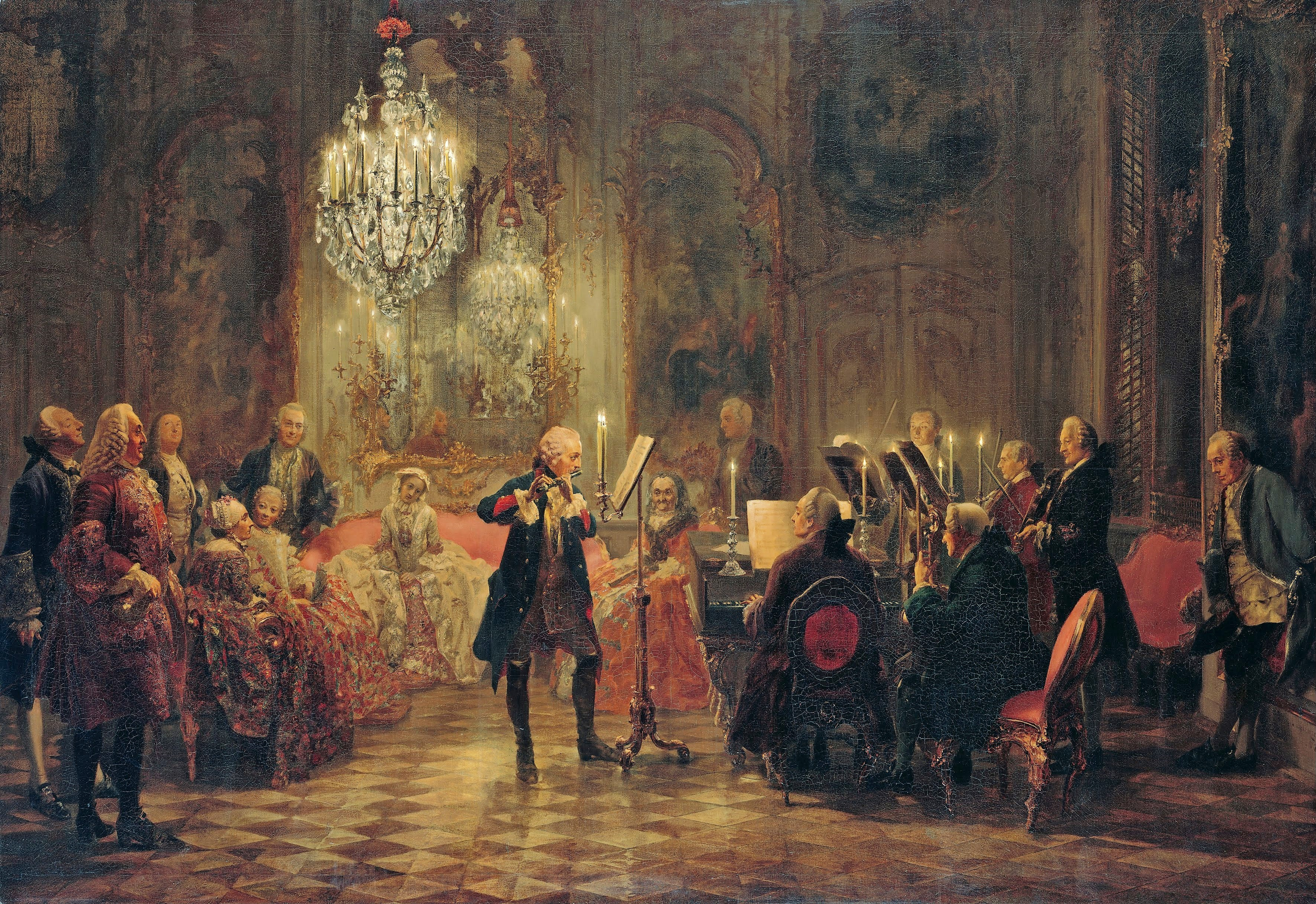
The Flute Concert, Adolph von Menzel, 1852

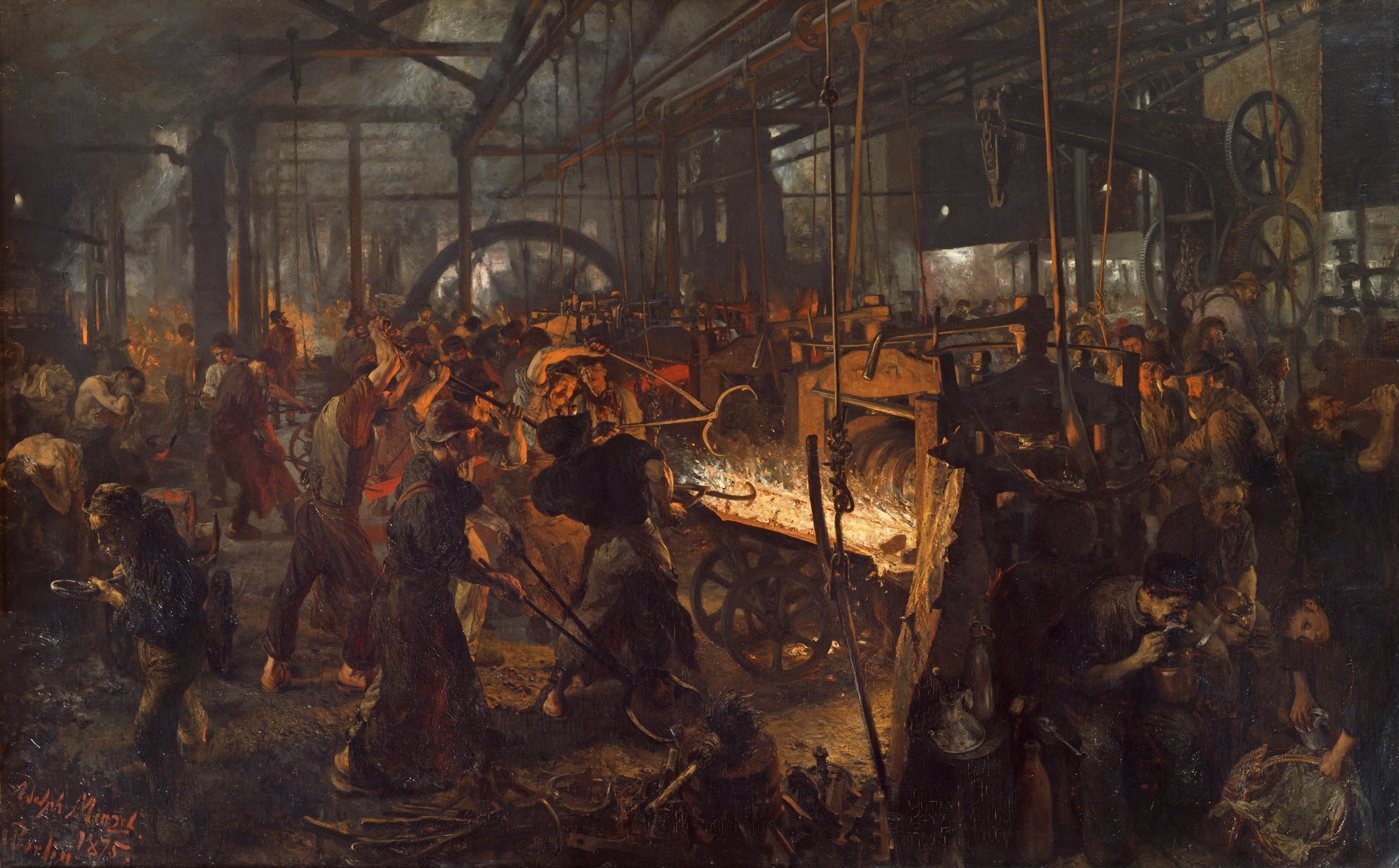
Eisenwalzwerk (The Iron Rolling Mill (Modern Cyclopes)), Adolph von Menzel, 1875

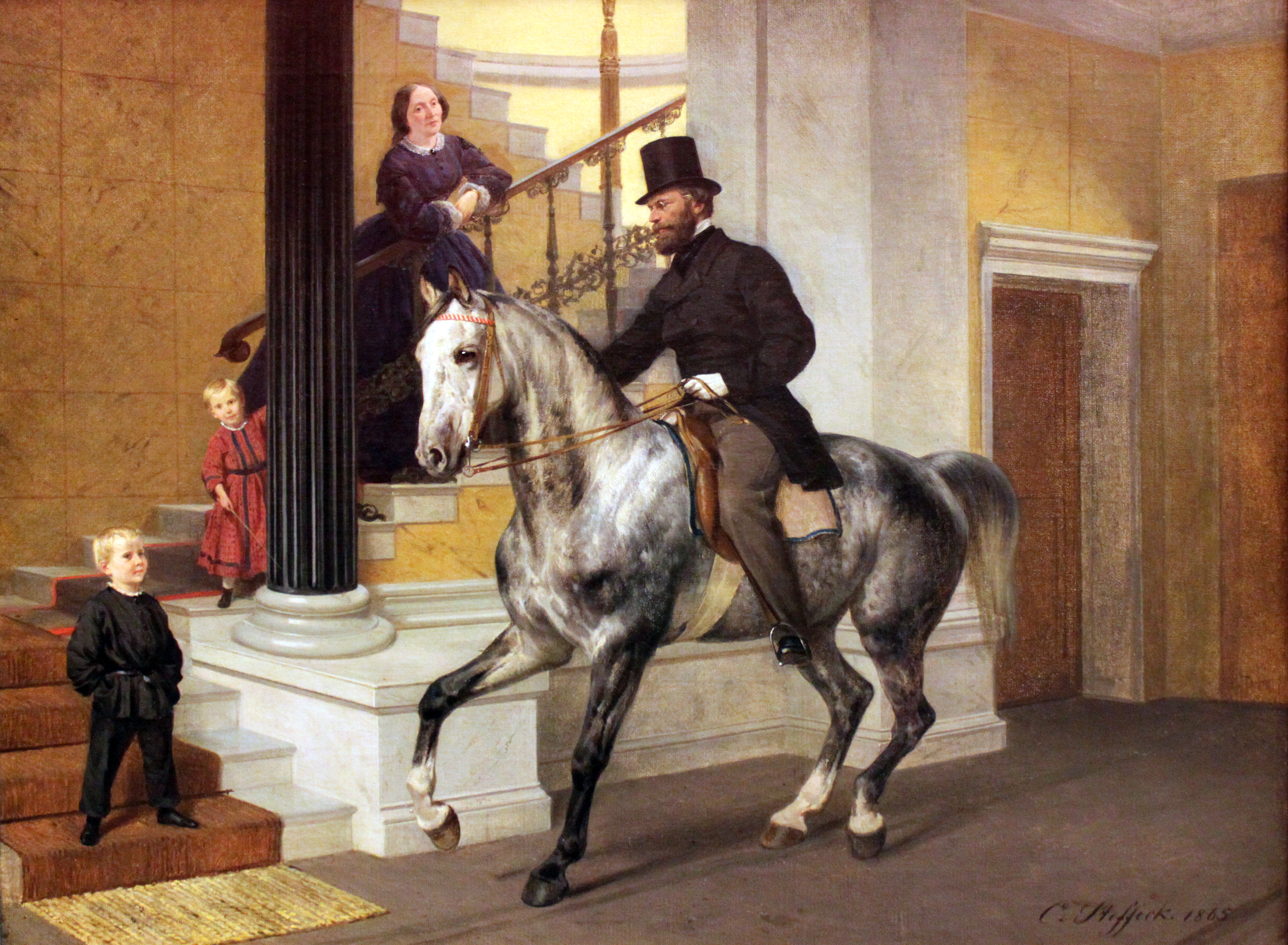
Portrait of the Advocate Ernst Lau, Carl Steffeck, 1865

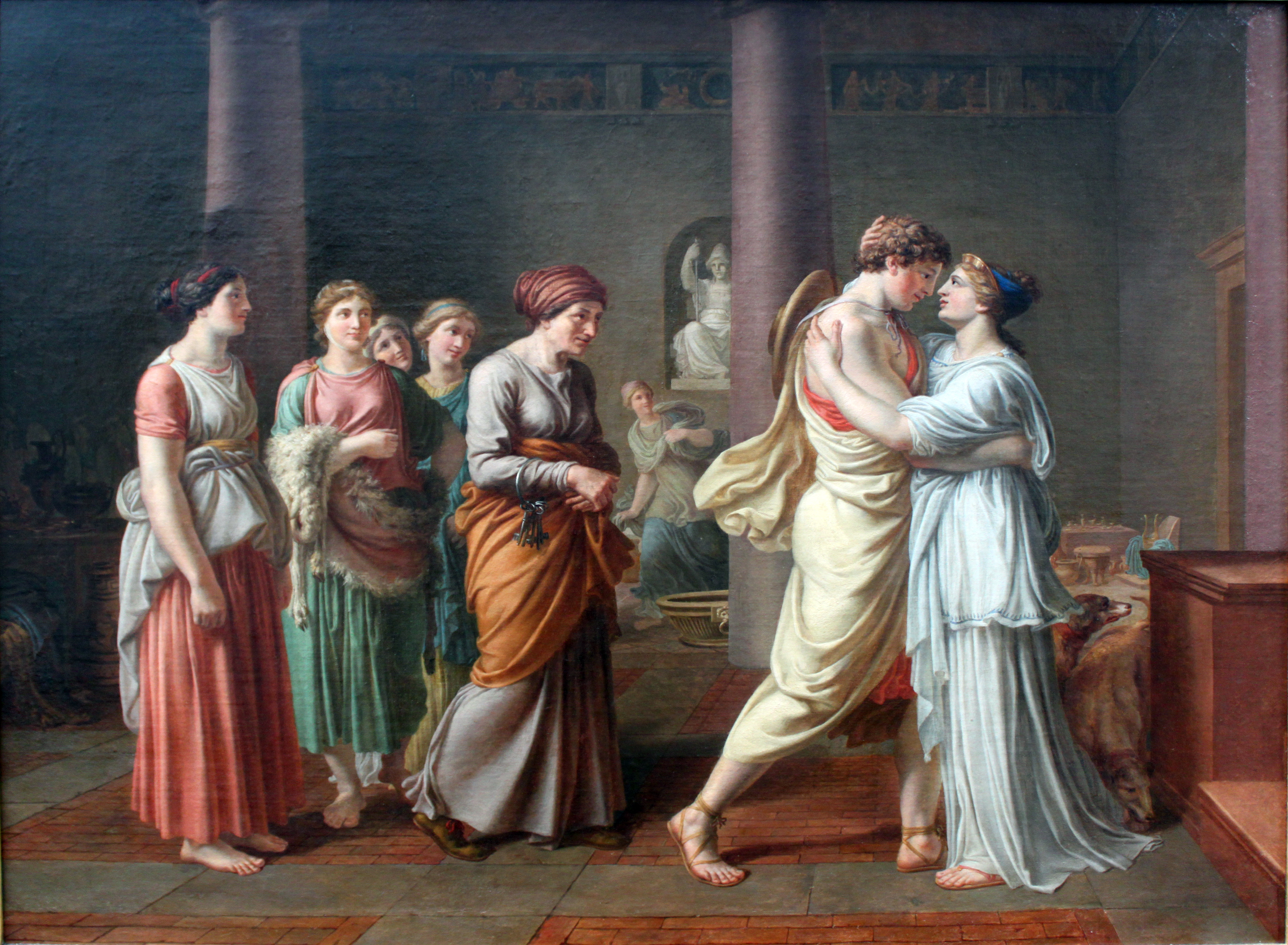
Telemachus' Return, Eberhard von Wächter, 1804

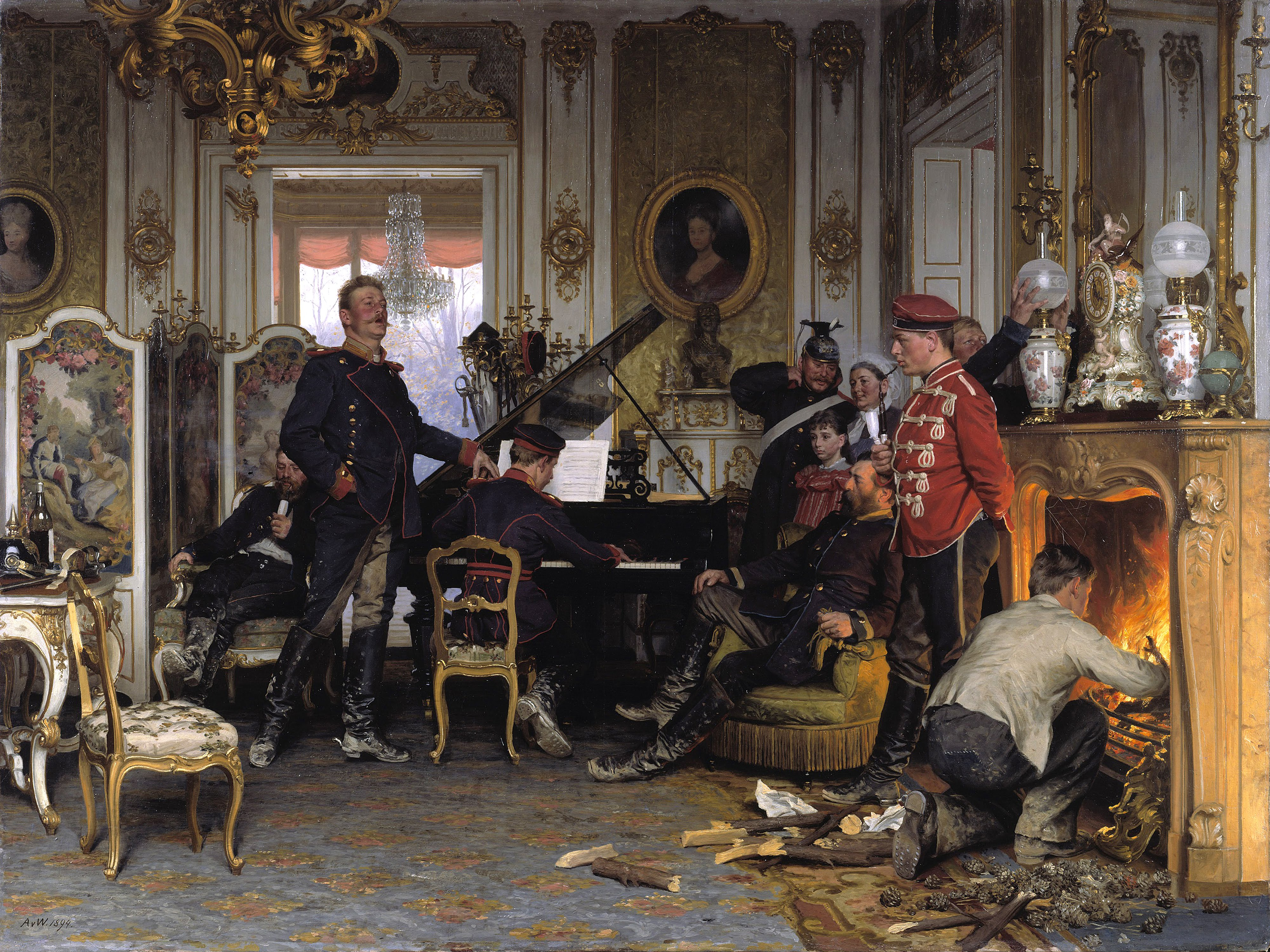
In the Troops' Quarters outside Paris, Anton von Werner, 1894

== See also ==
- List of art museums
- List of museums in Berlin
- List of museums in Germany
- List of national galleries
- List of tourist attractions in Berlin
- Neue Nationalgalerie
