= Carl Busse (architect) =

German architect

Carl Johann Otto Busse (22 September 1834, Berlin – 3 December 1896, Berlin) was a German architect and master builder. He was born as the son of architect Carl Ferdinand Busse (1802–1868). He married in 1865.

His work includes the 1880s extension of the Schloss Britz in Berlin.
