= Joachim Heinrich Wilhelm Wagener =

German banker and patron of the arts (1782–1861)

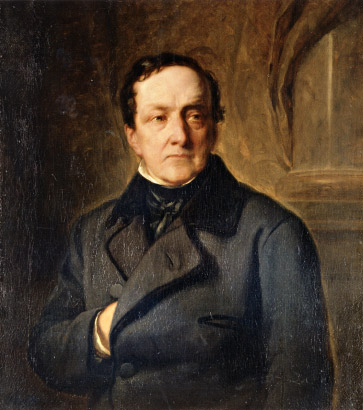
Julius Schrader: Joachim Heinrich Wilhelm Wagener (1856)

Joachim Heinrich Wilhelm Wagener (16 July 1782 in Berlin – 18 January 1861 in Berlin) was a German banker and patron of the arts. His collection formed the initial nucleus of the Alte Nationalgalerie in Berlin.

== Life and work ==
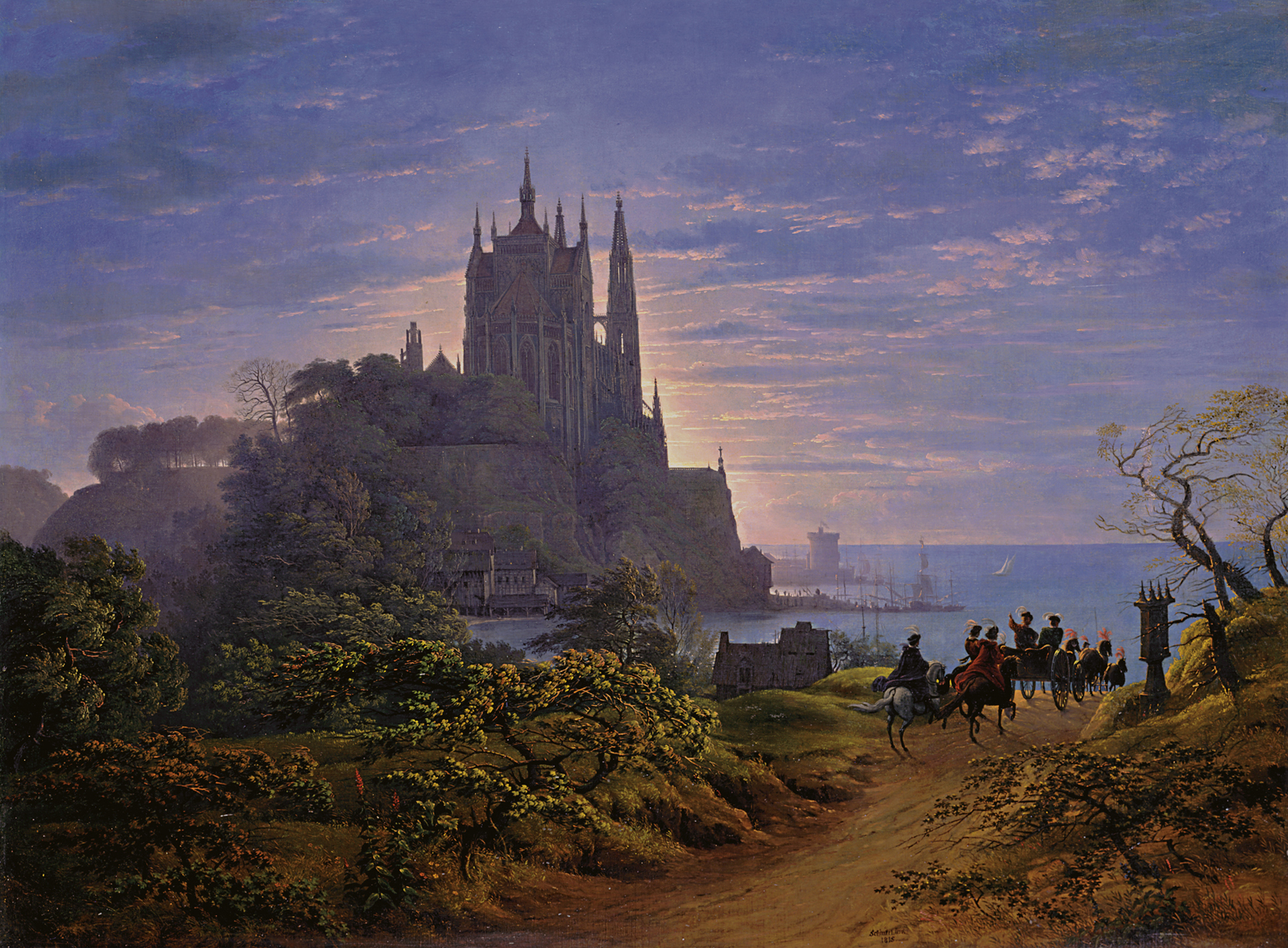
The first piece in Wagener's collection - Schinkel's Gothic Church on a rock by the sea

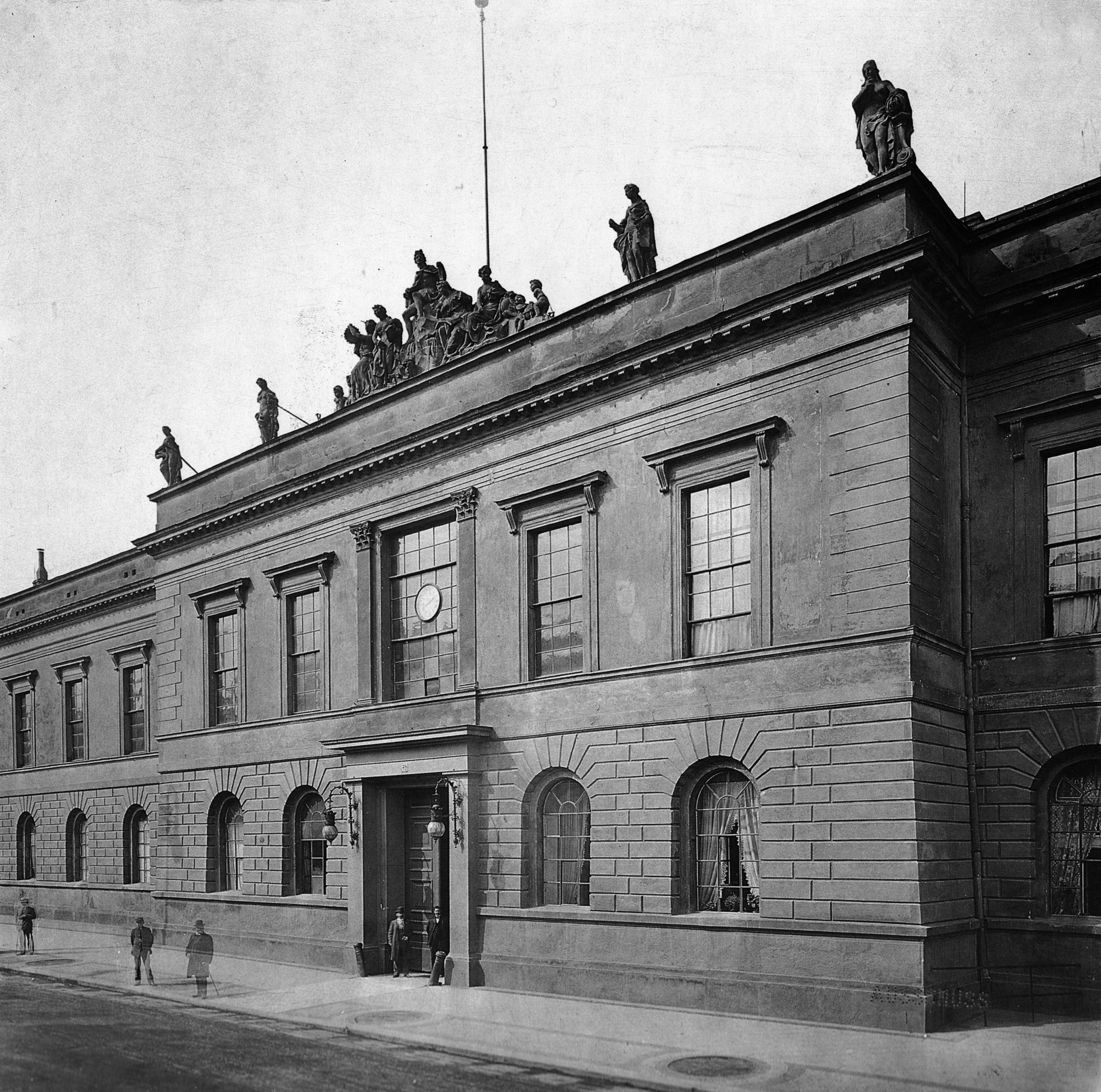
Alte Akademie der Künste, exit from the Nationalgalerie from 1861 to 1876

== Art collection ==
Wagener's collection started in 1815 when he acquired Karl Friedrich Schinkel's "Gothic Church on a Cliff by the Sea". His collection grew to include a number of landscapes which Wagener had commissioned or purchased, including works by German and international artists.

Wagener allowed the public to view his collection and commissioned the writing of catalogues.

In his 1859 will, Wagener left a gift to the Prussian Crown of his art collection on the condition that it form the basis for the creation of a national gallery. Accordingly, when he died in 1861, 262 works were bequeathed to the Crown, at that time the largest collection of contemporary painting in the world. The donation led to the opening of the National Gallery in Berlin the same year.

== Bibliography ==
=== Exhibition catalogues ===
- Gustav Friedrich Waagen: Verzeichniß der Gemälde-Sammlung des am 18. Januar zu Berlin verstorbenen königlichen schwedischen und norwegischen Konsuls J. H. W. Wagener, welche durch letztwillige Bestimmung in den Besitz S. M. des Königs übergegangen ist. Decker, Berlin 1861.

Digitalisat der Ausgabe 1866 (Columbia University NY).
Digitalisat der Ausgabe 1871 (Harvard).

- Katalog der Sammlung von Autographen und Historischen Documenten des im J. 1861 verstorbenen J. H. W. Wagener Bankier und K. Schwed. u. Norweg. Konsul in Berlin. Versteigerung den 26. Februar im Kunst-Auctions-Hause. (B. Lopke) zu Berlin. Berlin 1877.

=== Studies ===
- Udo Kittelmann / Birgit Verwiebe / Angelika Wesenberg (Hg.): Die Sammlung des Bankiers Wagener. Die Gründung der Nationalgalerie. E. A. Seemann Verlag, Leipzig 2011, ISBN 978-3-86502-274-5
- Eberhard Roters: Die Nationalgalerie und ihre Stifter. Mäzenatentum und staatliche Förderung in Dialog und Widerspruch. In: Günter Braun (Hrsg.): Mäzenatentum in Berlin. Walter de Gruyter, Berlin etc. 1993, ISBN 9783110137880, S. 73–98.
