= Tobias Feilner =

German potter

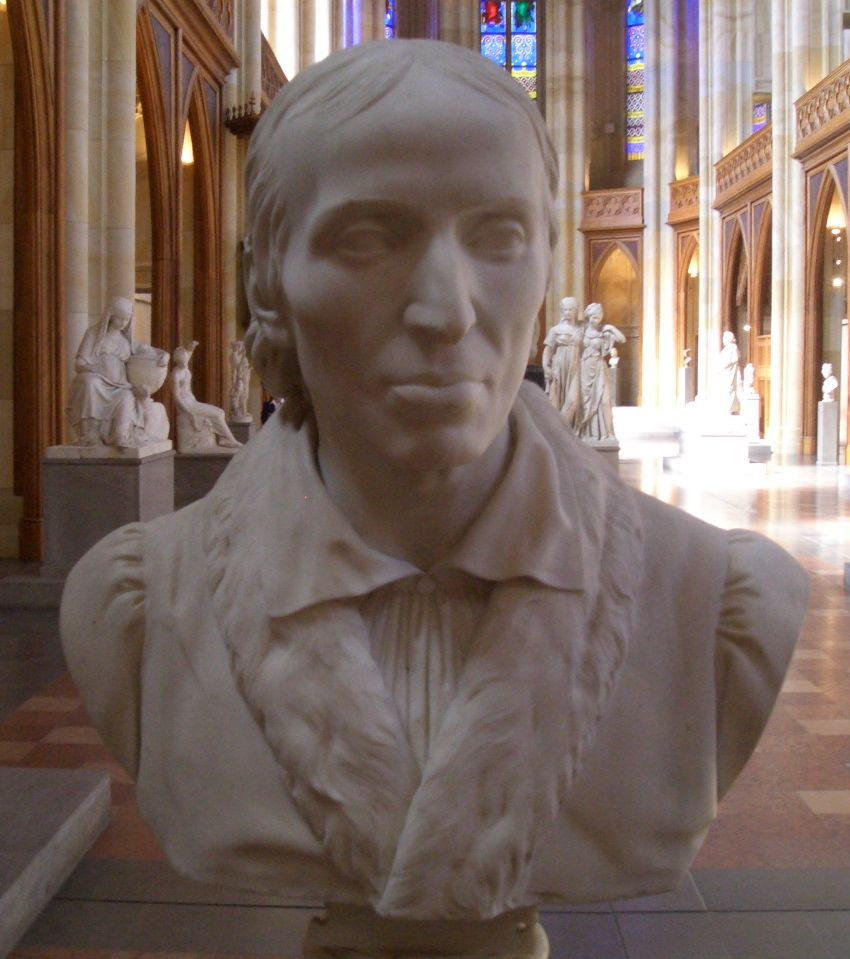
Tobias Feilner, bust by Ludwig Wilhelm Wichmann (1840)

Tobias Christoph Feilner (19 May 1773, Weiden in der Oberpfalz - 7 April 1839, Berlin) was a German master potter. He also manufactured bricks, terracotta, molded stones and masonry heaters.

== Biography ==
He was the third of ten children born to the master potter and city councilor, Philipp Heinrich Feilner. He learned the pottery trade from his father and left home in 1791, initially settling in Mannheim. There, he met his great uncle, Simon Feilner, who had been Director of the Frankenthal Porcelain Factory since 1775. The knowledge thus gained enabled him to find work at the faience factories in Alzey, Rheinhessen and Kurmainz. From 1792 to 1793, he worked for the master potter, Christian Leberecht Thomas, in Dresden.

With the assistance of Friedrich Abraham Wilhelm von Arnim (1767–1812), the Prussian Ambassador to Saxony, he was able to find a permanent position with Gottfried Höhler (1744-1812), who ran a furnace workshop in Berlin. He started there as a modeller, but was soon promoted to technical Foreman. In 1804, Feilner received a Royal Patent for an encaustic painting technique; used to create precise decorations on pottery and tiles. Höhler then made him a partner; leaving the business entirely in 1809. Following Höhler's death, the company became his.

In 1817, he expanded the company with a new factory building, and increased his workforce to 120 employees. He began producing terracotta in 1819. His products were used on the Friedrichswerder Church, the Old Palace, and the Church of Peace, Potsdam. Together with Karl Friedrich Schinkel, he developed a type of masonry heater that became standard in Germany by the middle of the 19th century. His heaters may still be seen at Schloss Tegel and Schloss Friedenstein, among many others. Some were sold in London, Rome and St. Petersburg. Until 1850, his company was the largest manufacturer of heaters in Germany. He was the teacher of another well known master potter, Ernst March. As a member of numerous trade and commercial organizations, he was also involved in civic affairs.

He married Charlotte Sophie Pausewang in 1800 and they had five children. Only two daughters survived to adulthood, however. One of them, Amalie, married the sculptor Ludwig Wilhelm Wichmann, who provided Feilner with numerous models for his terracotta work.

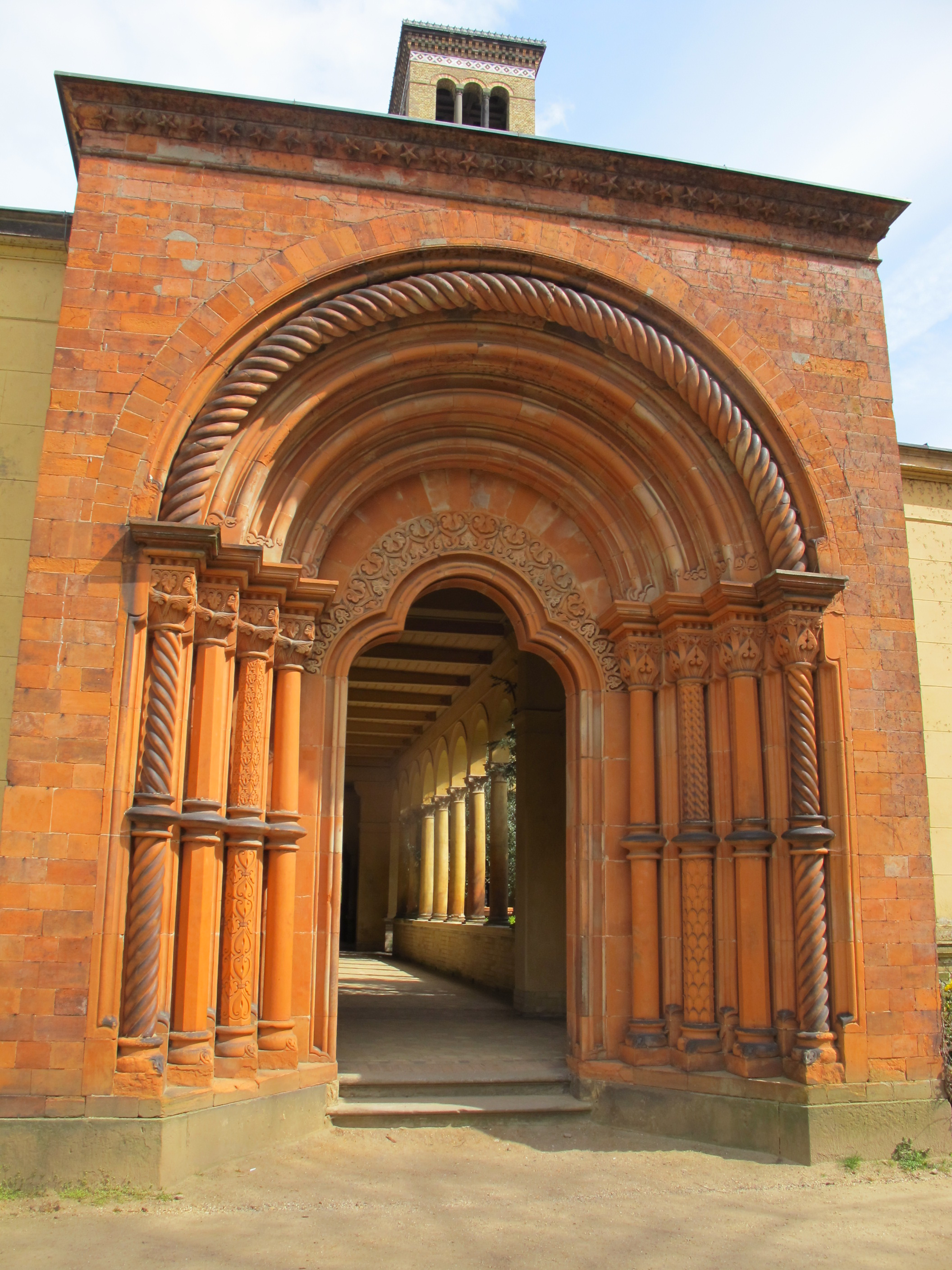
The Heilsbronn Porch, Church of Peace, Potsdam

He died at the age of sixty-five and was interred at the Luisenstädtischer Friedhof. His grave has not been preserved. In 1848, on the initiative of King Frederick William IV, the street where his factory was located was renamed the "Feilnerstraße".
