= Church of Peace, Potsdam =

Church of Peace
- Friedenskirche
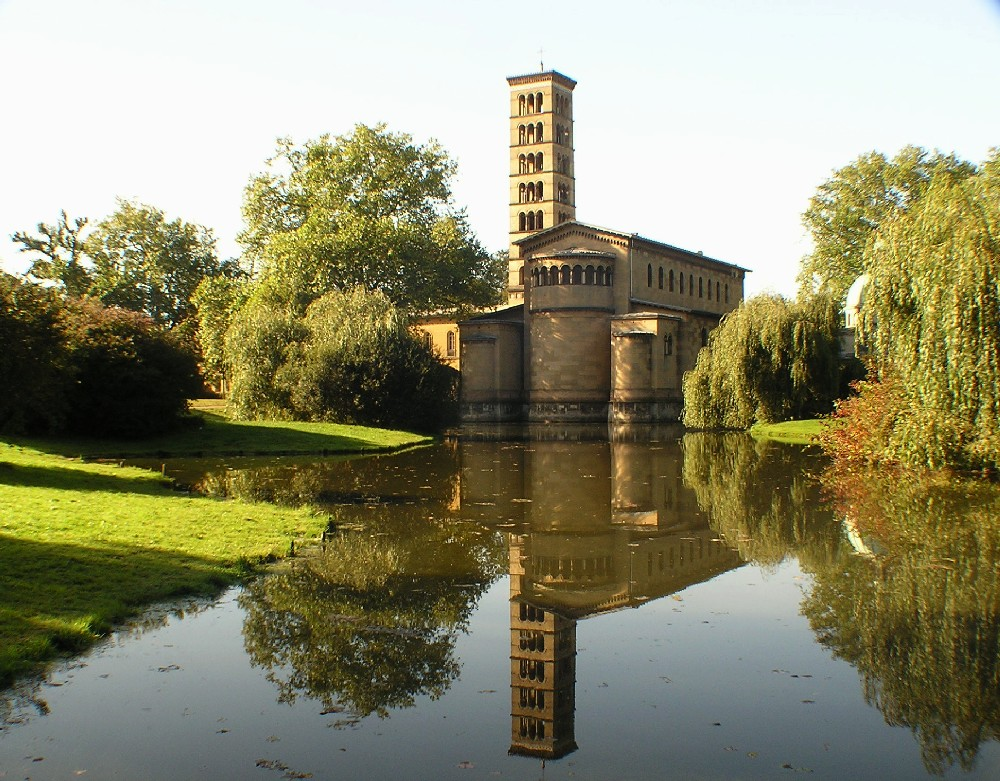
- Church of Peace in 2004

- Location within Brandenburg Location within Germany

General information
- Type: Church
- Architectural style: Romanesque Revival style
- Location: Am Grünen Gitter 3, Potsdam, Germany
- Coordinates: 52°24′03″N 13°02′36″E
- Current tenants: Friedenskirchengemeinde Potsdam
- Construction started: 1845
- Completed: 1854
- Inaugurated: 24 September 1848; 177 years ago
- Client: King Frederick William IV of Prussia
- Owner: Prussian Palaces and Gardens Foundation Berlin-Brandenburg

Design and construction
- Architects: Ludwig Persius, Friedrich August Stüler

The Protestant Church of Peace (German: Friedenskirche) is situated in the Marly Gardens on the Green Fence (Am Grünen Gitter) in the palace grounds of Sanssouci Park in Potsdam, Germany. The church was built according to the wishes and with the close involvement of the artistically gifted King Frederick William IV and designed by the court architect, Ludwig Persius. After Persius' death in 1845, the architect Friedrich August Stüler was charged with continuing his work. Building included work by Ferdinand von Arnim and Ludwig Ferdinand Hesse also. The church is located in the area covered by the UNESCO World Heritage Site Palaces and Parks of Potsdam and Berlin.

The cornerstone of the churchhouse was laid on 14 April 1845. The building was dedicated on 24 September 1848, though construction continued until 1854. The structure resembles a High Medieval Italian monastery.

== The Church of Peace ==
Frederick William himself made the original sketches on which the design was to be based. He gave his court architect Ludwig Persius two main instructions: The church was to derive in form and size from the early Christian Basilica di San Clemente in Rome. And it had to accommodate the apse mosaic from the church San Cipriano on the island of Murano in the Venetian Lagoon, which Frederick William had purchased in 1834 when that church was scheduled for demolition. A popular etching of the early Christian version of the Basilica di San Clemente in Rome made by Johann Gottfried Gutensohn and Johann Michael Knapp probably inspired the design of the Potsdam church.

Under Frederick William, the church served as the chapel royal and as church for the parish of Brandenburger Vorstadt (a part of Potsdam).

The church is a columned basilica with three naves and no transept, with a free-standing belltower. The 13.5 m high central nave overlaps the side aisles, which are half as wide. An arcade of central arches mark the crossing point.

The religious Frederick William IV desired a flat coffered ceiling on the inside, with gold stars on a blue base painted on the panels.

The king saw the design of early Christian sacred buildings, converted from market and court halls, as particularly appropriate. He was trying to establish a reconciliation between the Protestant majority of the original Prussian state and the Catholics of the more recently acquired lands, notably in the Rhineland Province. Since he associated Gothic architecture with the Catholic faith, he was looking for an alternative design vocabulary for the Prussian-Protestant church. Skipping Martin Luther, he went back to early Christianity as an inspiration. However, he did not distinguish too finely between early Christian and High Medieval architecture - as long as it was Romanesque.

An original Venetian mosaic from the early 13th century decorates the church's apse. While he was crown prince Frederick William had it bought at auction for 385 thalers and brought to Potsdam by boat. The mosaic shows the enthroned Christ with the Book of Life, the right hand upheld in blessing. At each side stand Mary and John the Baptist. Next to them stand the apostle Peter and Saint Cyprian, martyred by beheading in 258 and patron saint of the church San Cipriano, wearing chasubles. As an allegory for the Holy Spirit, a dove decorates the vertex of the hemisphere. Over the heads of the archangels Raphael and Michael a lamb shines as a symbol of Christ. On the semicircle of the apse a Latin inscript reads, according to Martin Luther's translation: "Lord, I have love for the site of your house and the place where your glory resides".

The altar canopy, which rests on four dark green columns, was created from Siberian jasper (semi-precious stones) and was a gift from Tsar Nicholas I of Russia, the king's brother in law. It was installed in the Church of Peace in 1842.

In the right-hand aisle lies the former baptistery. The six-sided baptismal stone was relocated in 1965.

The counterpart to the baptistery is the sacristy in the left-hand aisle. After the death of Frederick William IV it was used temporarily as a mausoleum for him and for other deceased members of the House of Hohenzollern. The son of Emperor Friedrich III and his wife Empress Victoria, as well as the Princes Sigismund and Waldemar, were entombed here until 1892. In 1920 the youngest son of Wilhelm II, the last Emperor of Germany, was interred in the sacristy. After 1931 he was moved to the Antique Temple.

Under two marble tablets, embedded in the ground in front of the steps of the altar room, the royal crypt can be found. Frederick William IV died following several strokes on 2 January 1861, and following the dedication of the crypt in October 1864 his coffin was placed there. The heart of the king, however, rests in the mausoleum of Charlottenburg Palace in Berlin. He was laid in the ground at the feet of his parents, King Frederick William III and Queen Louise.

In 1873 his wife Elisabeth Ludovika followed him to the grave. Both coffins, made out of English tin, carry the same inscript as the marble plates in the church floor: "Here he rests in God, his Redeemer, in the hope of resurrection in the soul and a merciful judgement, justified solely by the service of Jesus Christ our most holy Saviour and Only Life".

In the year of the crypt's dedication, the flooring of the church was completed as Frederick William IV had wished; the design is an intricately interleaved endless ribbon which represents eternity.

The free-standing, 42 m high campanile (belltower), on the southern side, is based on the design of the campanile of Santa Maria in Cosmedin in Rome. An aedicula (column-bearing dais) on the east side bears the fresco "Jesus in Gethsemane" by Eduard Steinbrück. The tower has seven open floors. The four bells, named Gratia, Clementia, Pax and Gloria, sound from the third floor above the clockwork. In 1917 and 1945 they were all taken from the tower to be melted down for the war effort, but escaped this unhappy fate.

An open porch (narthex) across the western side of the portal opens into an inner courtyard (atrium). The larger-than-life statue of Christ on the fountain is a copy of the marble original, created in 1821 by Bertel Thorvaldsen, in the Copenhagen Church of Our Lady. The ancient Greek inscript on the edge of the fountain reads: "Cleanse thyself of thy sins and not just thy face". An arcade surrounds the inner courtyard.

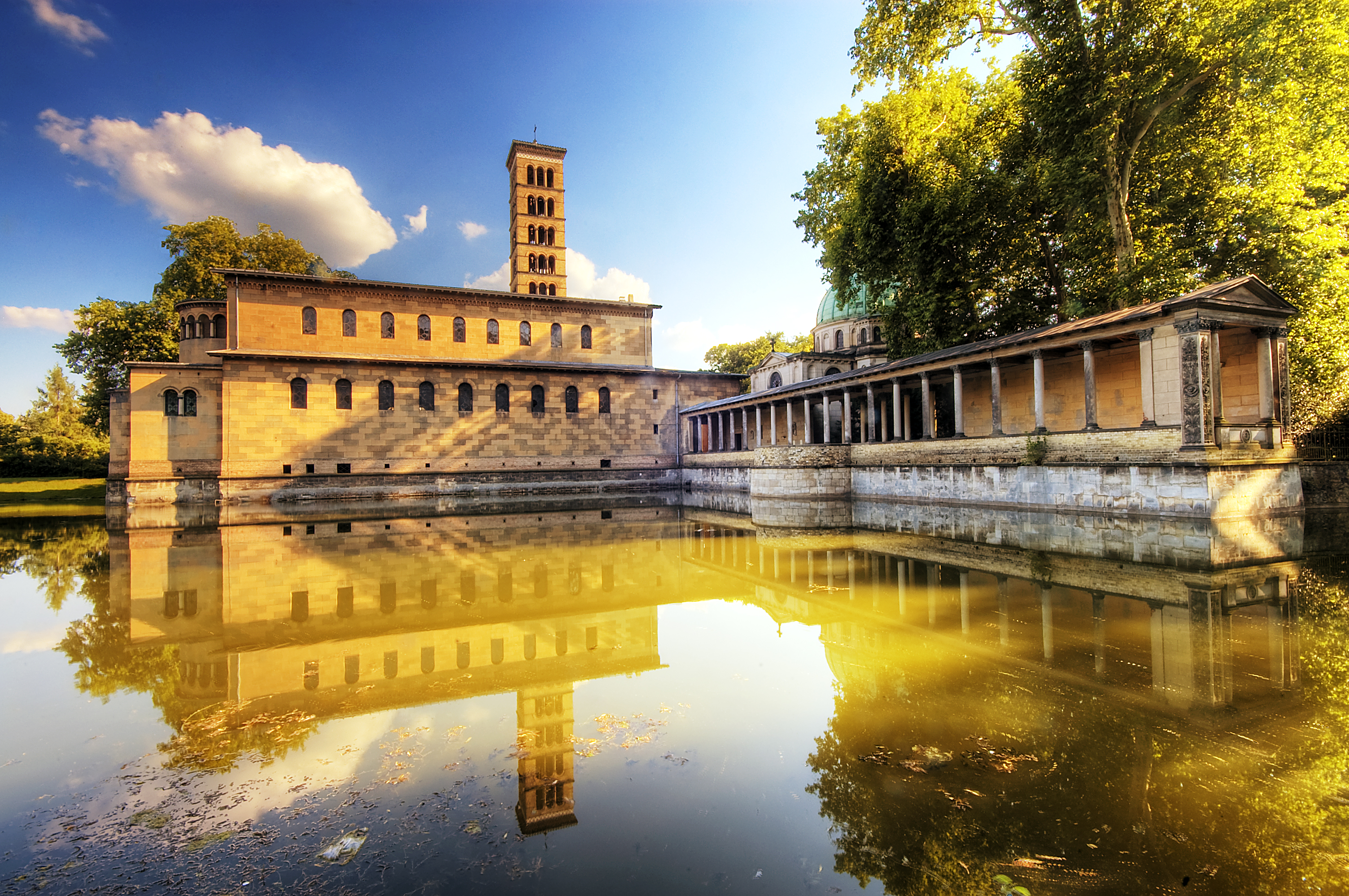
The church lake

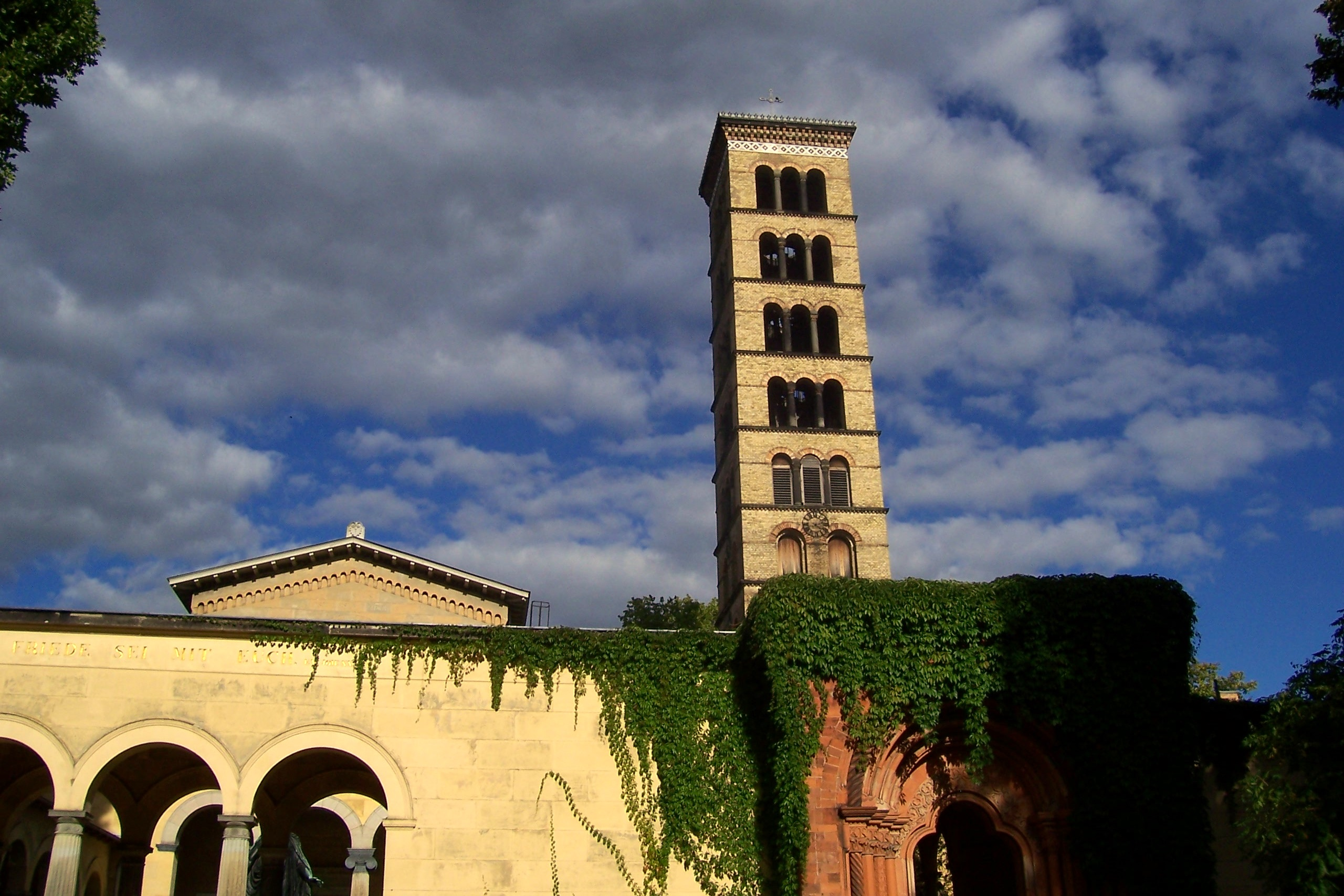
Cloisters

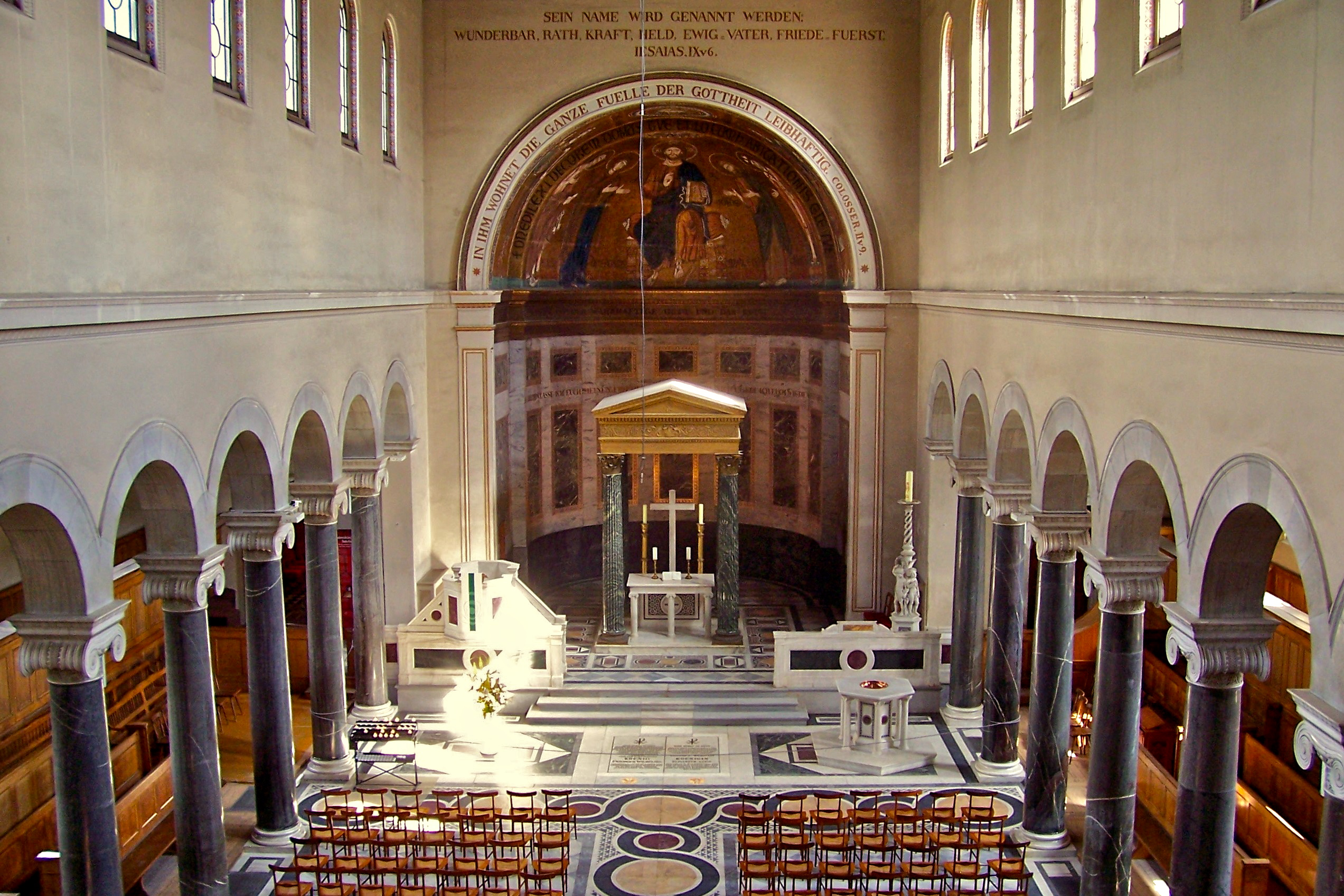
View from the organ gallery

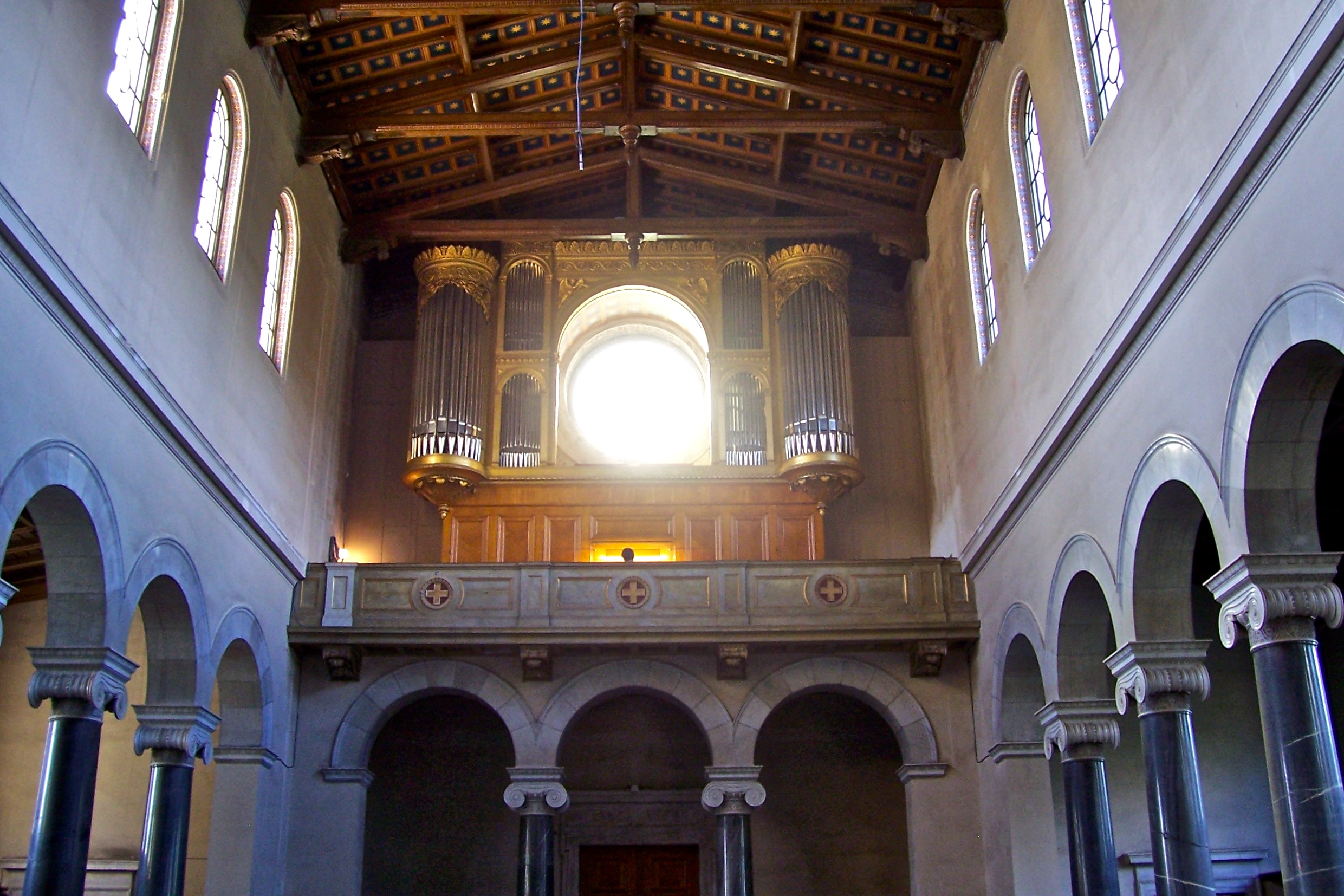
Woehl organ

== Kaiser Friedrich Mausoleum ==
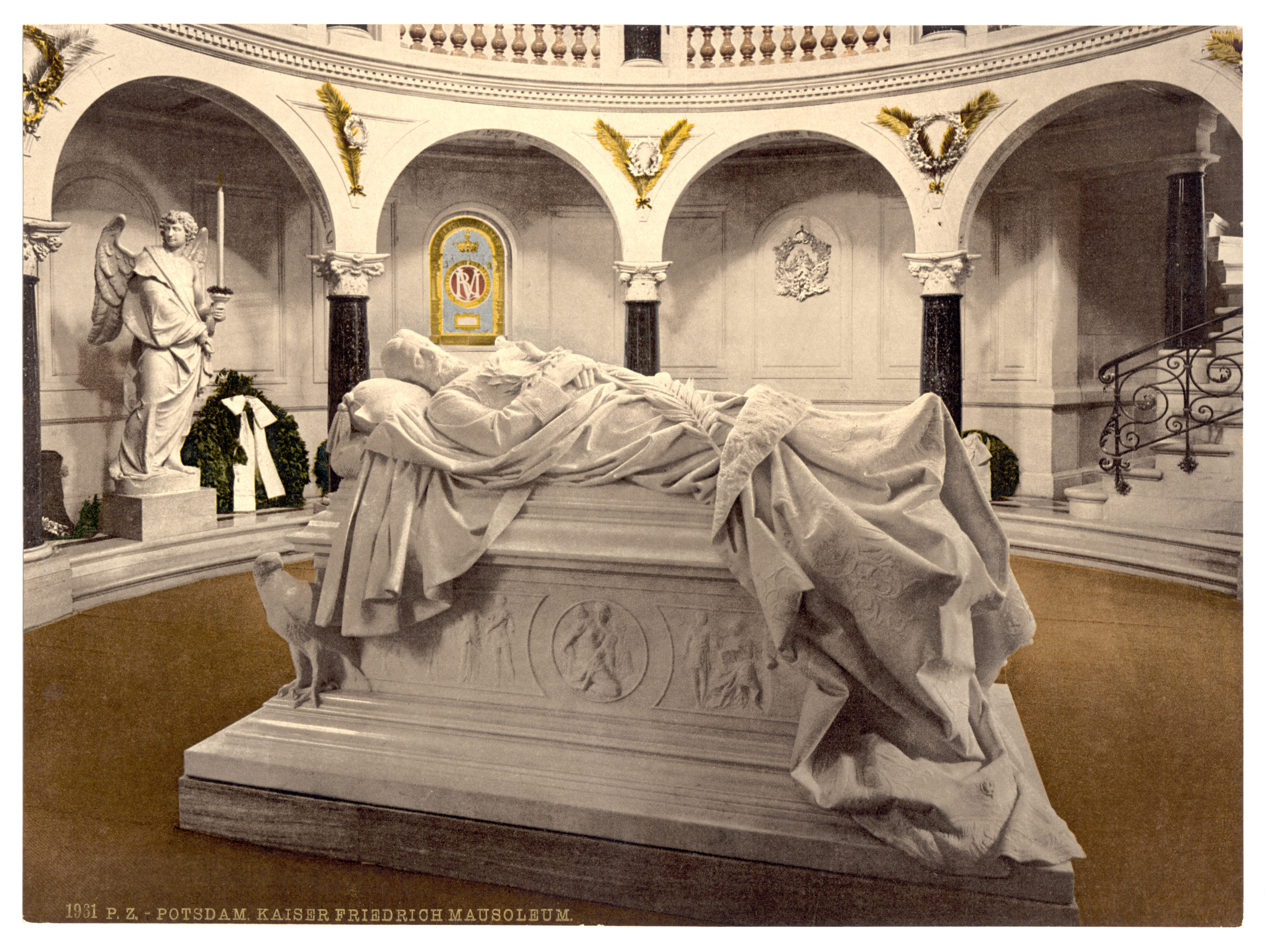
Friedrich III, Emperor Mausoleum c.1900

The Kaiser Friedrich Mausoleum was added to the north side between 1888 and 1890. The plans were drawn up by Julius Carl Raschdorff, who also designed the Berlin Cathedral from 1893 to 1905, in the style of the Baroque-influenced Italian High Renaissance. The 17th century Chapel of the Holy Tomb in Innichen, South Tyrol, Italy serves as an archetype for the mausoleum.

The mausoleum is a domed structure with an oval outline and an attached rectangular altar room. The inside contains a surrounding gallery and the domed roof, supported by two black columns, one on top of the other, which run around the edge. A golden mosaic on the inside of the roof shows alternating angels and palm trees.

In the middle of the rotunda stands the marble sarcophagus of German Emperor Friedrich III and his wife Empress Victoria, formerly Princess Royal of Great Britain and Ireland. The effigies were executed by Reinhold Begas, who also completed the sarcophagi which stand on the side walls of the altar room and contain the remains of Prince Sigismund (1864–1866) and Prince Waldemar (1868–1879), sons of the imperial couple who both died at a young age; they were transferred into the mausoleum from the Church of Peace.

Since 1991, the plain coffin of the Soldier-King Frederick William I has stood on the steps to the altar. Originally entombed in the now destroyed Garrison Church in Potsdam, like his son Frederick the Great, the coffin was moved shortly before the end of the war in 1945. Until 1953 it lay in the Elisabeth Church in Marburg, Hesse, and until 1991 in Burg Hohenzollern at Hechingen, Baden-Württemberg. The original black marble sarcophagus was destroyed in 1945, and the current one is a copy made from copper.

== Heilsbronn Porch ==
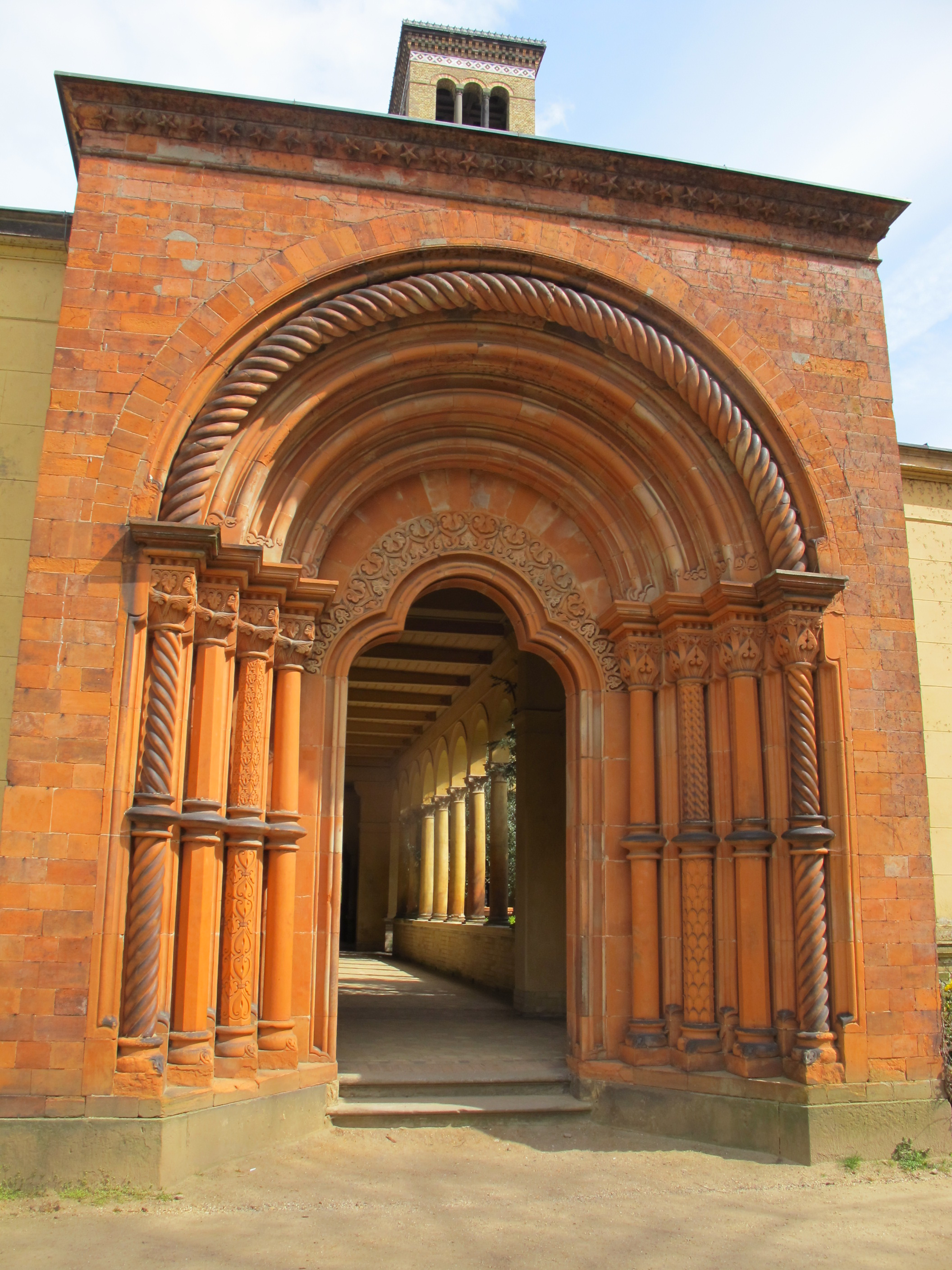
Heilsbronn Porch

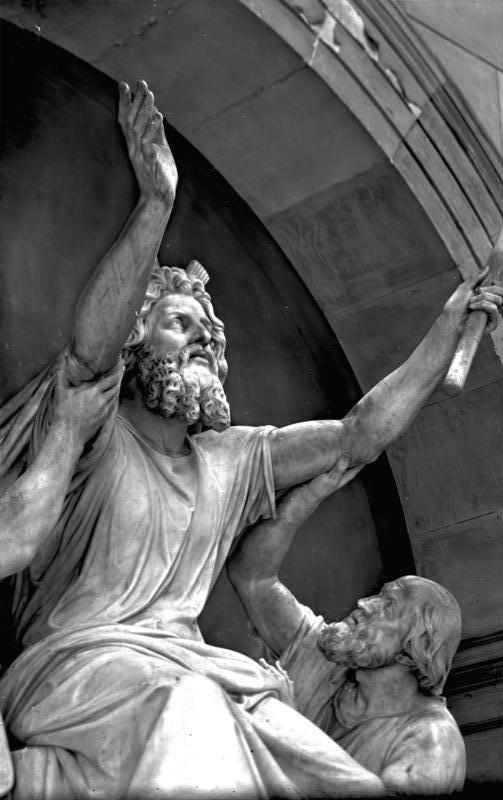
Moses in prayer for his people for help against the Amalekites, supported by the high priests Aaron and Hur" (outside the picture)

A marble relief in the south part of the arcade is the last work of the sculptor Christian Daniel Rauch. It shows "Moses in prayer, supported by the high priests Aaron and Hur".

Parallel to the southern arcade runs the cloister with the Heilsbronn Porch, an entrance to the Marly Gardens. It is a replica of a Roman tiered porch at the former refectory in the Heilsbronn Cloister in Middle Franconia, which caught the eye of the architect Ludwig Ferdinand Hesse while he was on a study trip in 1828. He instructed the Berlin potter Tobias Feilner to imitate the entrance in reddish terracotta. Frederick William IV explicitly rejected Hesse's suggestion to incorporate the copy, but Hesse nonetheless had the porch installed two years after the king's death. The original from the Heilsbronn Cloister was brought to the National Germanic Museum in Nuremberg, where it was almost entirely destroyed at the end of the Second World War in 1945.

== Adjacent buildings and gates ==
To the south, along the length of the bell tower, stretches the Cavalier's House, a former guest house. Adjoining it is the Porter's House with its short tower and in the right-hand nook is the Rector's and Schoolhouse.

Frederick William IV had two entrances to the park created for the congregation. One a low auxiliary gate built near the Green Fence. Through it visitors arrive with "reverentially bowed posture" onto the grounds of the Church of Peace.

A second entrance, that is no longer used today, lies on the eastern edge of the park, near the Obelisk. The Gate of Three Kings was created by Ludwig Ferdinand Hesse in the classical style and shows sculptures of Kings David, Solomon and Charlemagne.

== The park grounds ==
With the eastern outskirts of the park Frederick William IV wanted to create, among others, a connection between the park and the city. In the Marly Gardens, the kitchen garden of the soldier-king Frederick William I, a place of tranquility was created. The garden architect Peter Joseph Lenné embedded the group of buildings in an attractive park with two distinct gardens.

The Garden of Peace, on the side of the city in the east, is planted with small groups of trees and bushes laid out and contains the Pool of Peace. The water plays around the church building on the north and east sides. The Marly Gardens, only three hectares in area, adjoins the site of the church on the west. The compact planting of groups of trees and bushes, access balconies, flower beds and sculptures reflect a picture of romantic playfulness.

== Current state ==
As of 2015, various parts of the church were in need of repair. The Campanile has already required emergency stabilisation work. The Venetian mosaic is also at risk. The iron parts of the construction underlying the mosaic (imported in its original mortar setting) are rusting. In addition, the roofs of the side aisles are leaking, allowing water to seep into the walls.

== See also ==
- Church of the Redeemer, Sacrow
