= Belvedere on the Pfingstberg =

World Heritage Site in Germany

Coordinates: 52°25′08″N 13°03′32″E

- Belvedere auf dem Pfingstberg
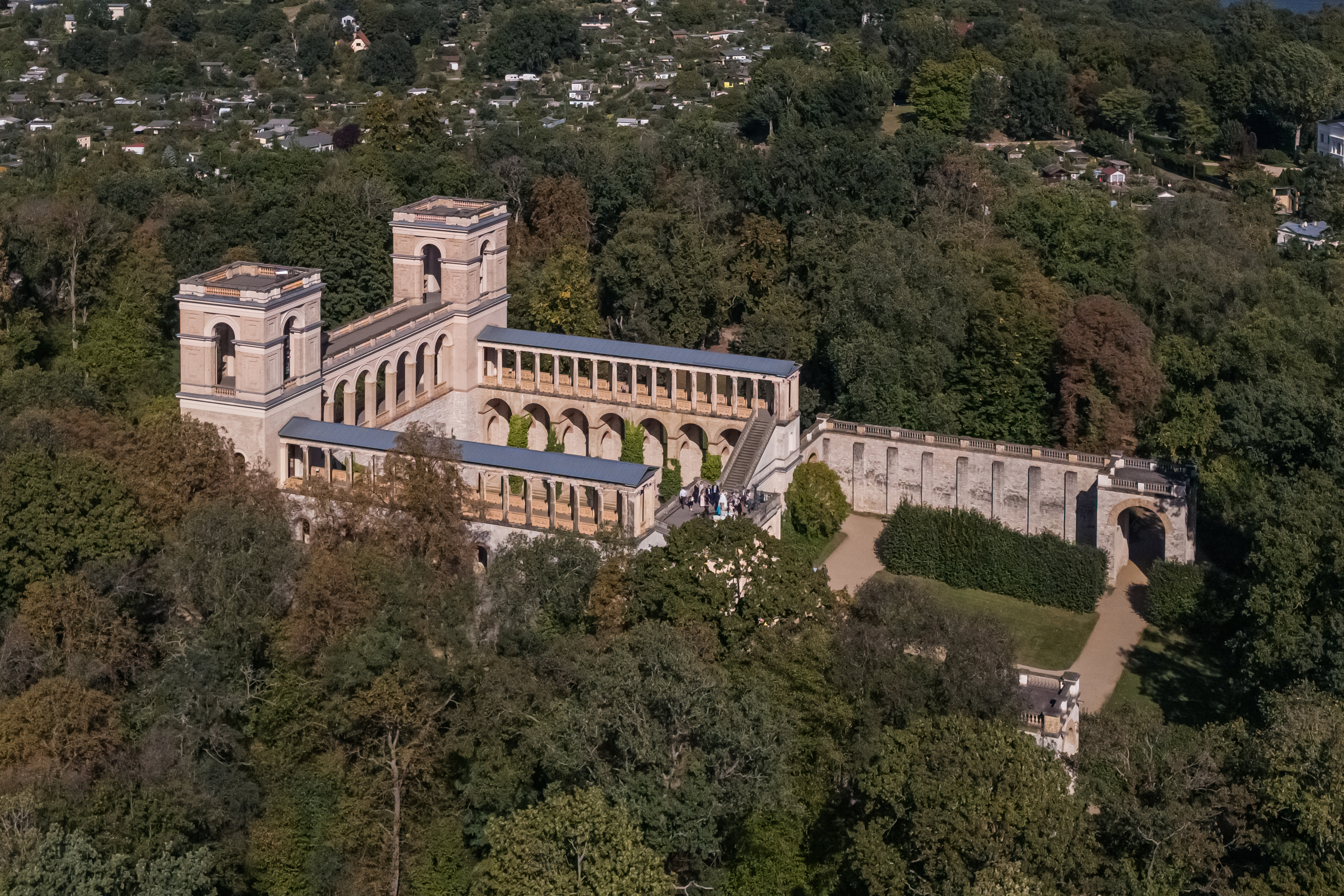
- Aerial view of the Belvedere on the Pfingstberg
- Interactive map of the Belvedere on the Pfingstberg area

General information
- Type: Palace, viewing structure
- Architectural style: Renaissance Revival
- Location: Potsdam, Germany
- Groundbreaking: 1847
- Completed: 1863
- Renovated: 1988–2005
- Landlord: Stiftung Preussische Schlösser und Gärten

Design and construction
- Architects: Ludwig Persius, Friedrich August Stüler, Ludwig Ferdinand Hesse, Peter Joseph Lenné (gardens)

Website
- www.spsg.de/en/palaces-gardens/object/belvedere-pfingstberg/

UNESCO World Heritage Site
- Part of: Palaces and Parks of Potsdam and Berlin
- Criteria: Cultural: (i), (ii), (iv)
- Reference: 532ter
- Inscription: 1990 (14th Session)
- Extensions: 1992, 1999

The Belvedere on the Pfingstberg (German: Belvedere auf dem Pfingstberg) is a palace north of the New Garden in Potsdam, Germany, at the summit of Pfingstberg hill. It was commissioned by King Friedrich Wilhelm IV of Prussia and built between 1847 and 1863 as a viewing platform.

Because of its architecture and historical importance, the Belvedere forms part of the UNESCO World Heritage Site Palaces and Parks of Potsdam and Berlin, inscribed in 1999.

== History ==
It was commissioned by King Friedrich Wilhelm IV of Prussia and as completed is only part of a substantially more extensive project for the hilltop site. The Belvedere was built, as its name suggests, as a viewing platform for visitors and contains only two modest scale rooms for entertainment, one in each upper tower. The mural decoration of these (Roman-Etruscan and Moorish, respectively) is mostly now lost.

Architecturally eclectic, the two towers are modelled on Italian Renaissance architecture whilst the wings are Roman in style and some of the detailed decoration is Greek-inspired. It was constructed between 1847 and 1863 with an interruption from 1852 to 1860.

Based on sketches from the King, the architects, Ludwig Persius, Friedrich August Stüler and Ludwig Ferdinand Hesse, drew detailed plans. The landscape architect Peter Joseph Lenné was responsible for the design of the grounds which are planted in the manner of the English landscape garden, with serpentine paths and dense copses of hardwood trees. These now obstruct views of the Belvedere from the park and almost all points in Potsdam, but are apparently as designed by Lenné.

The Belvedere fell into disrepair during World War II and was left abandoned in the period of the German Democratic Republic. It was repaired between 1988 and 2005 by an association formed by a group of local residents. Today, the Belvedere is open to visitors and is still managed by the Förderverein Pfingstberg e.V. who won major financial backing for the restoration. Major contributors included the Hermann Reemtsma Stiftung and Werner Otto.

== Description ==
The twin prospect towers from which the view over Potsdam is achieved rise above a very high podium. This is in the form of a three-sided courtyard with central reflecting pool. The three sides of the courtyard are themselves each capped with viewing terraces under colonnades – two Corinthian and one with astylar round arches.

Visitors ascend by many steps both outside and inside, with the final ascent being made via a narrow iron spiral staircase. Because of the dense tree planting of the park the view can only be achieved from the upper level.

== Today ==
Occasional concerts are held on a stage in the reflecting pool of the courtyard and the two Belvedere rooms are available as a marriage venue.

Weddings can also be held by the reflecting pool in the courtyard, although the last outside wedding for 2020 was held on 16 October at 1:30pm.

== Gallery ==
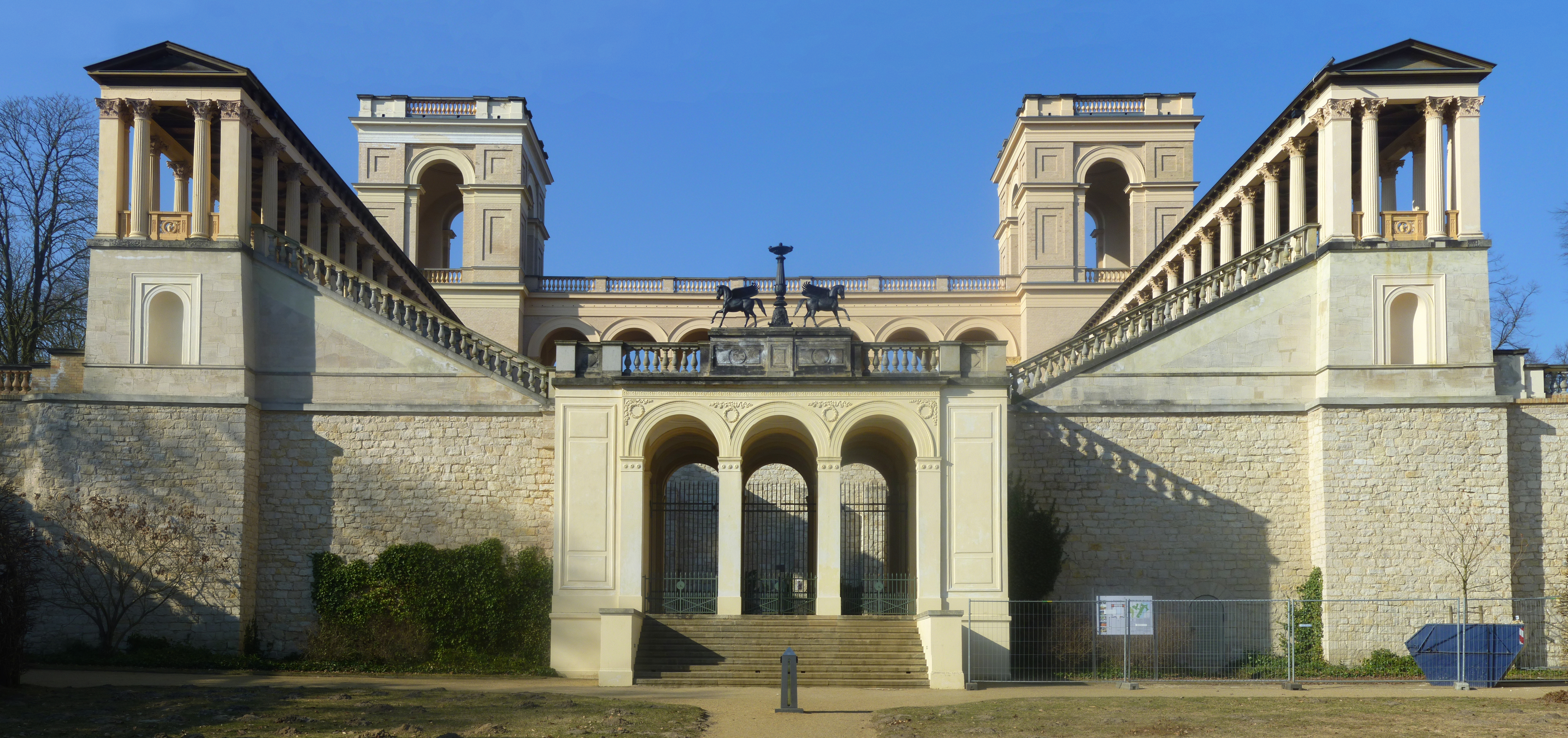
View from southeast

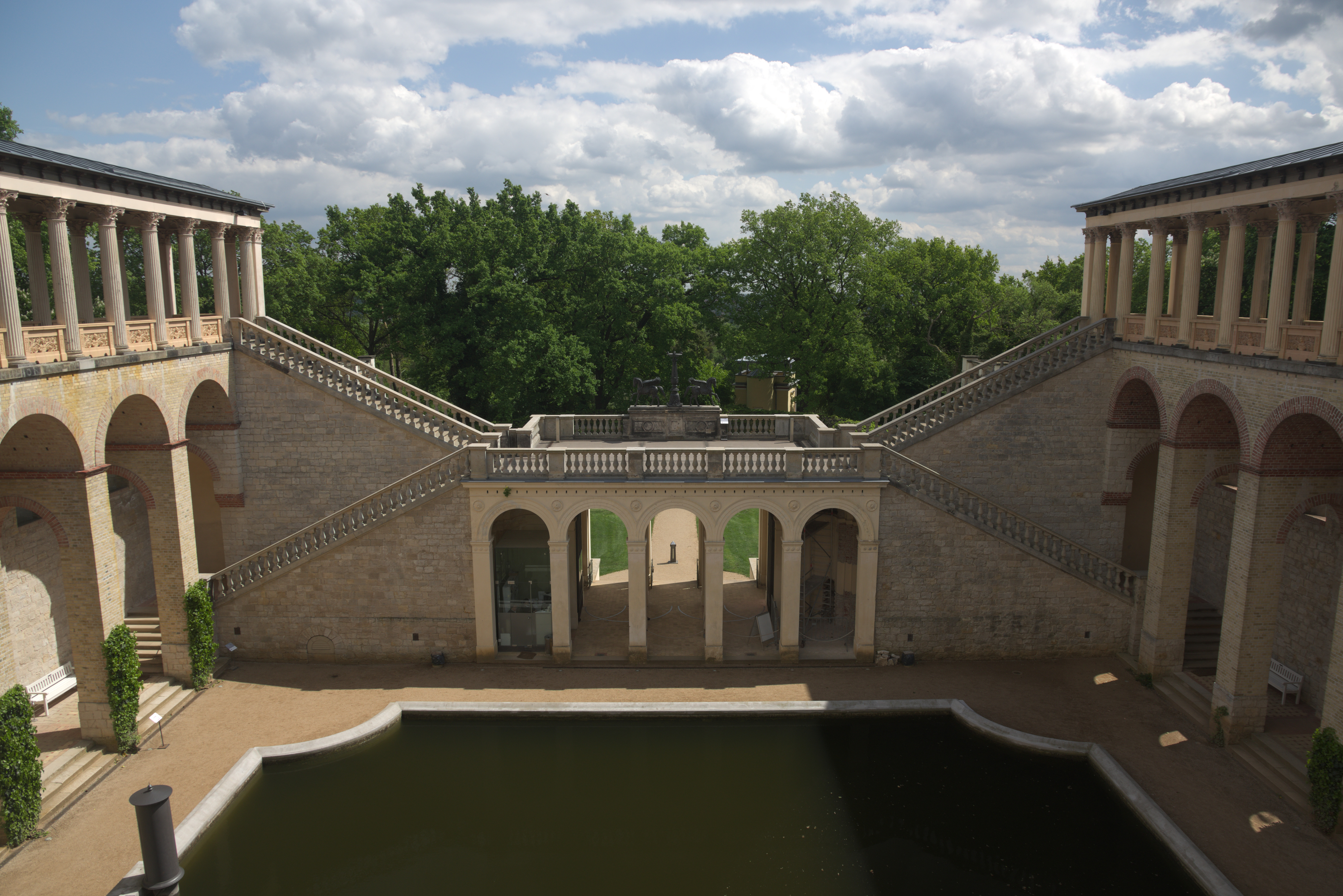
Interior courtyard

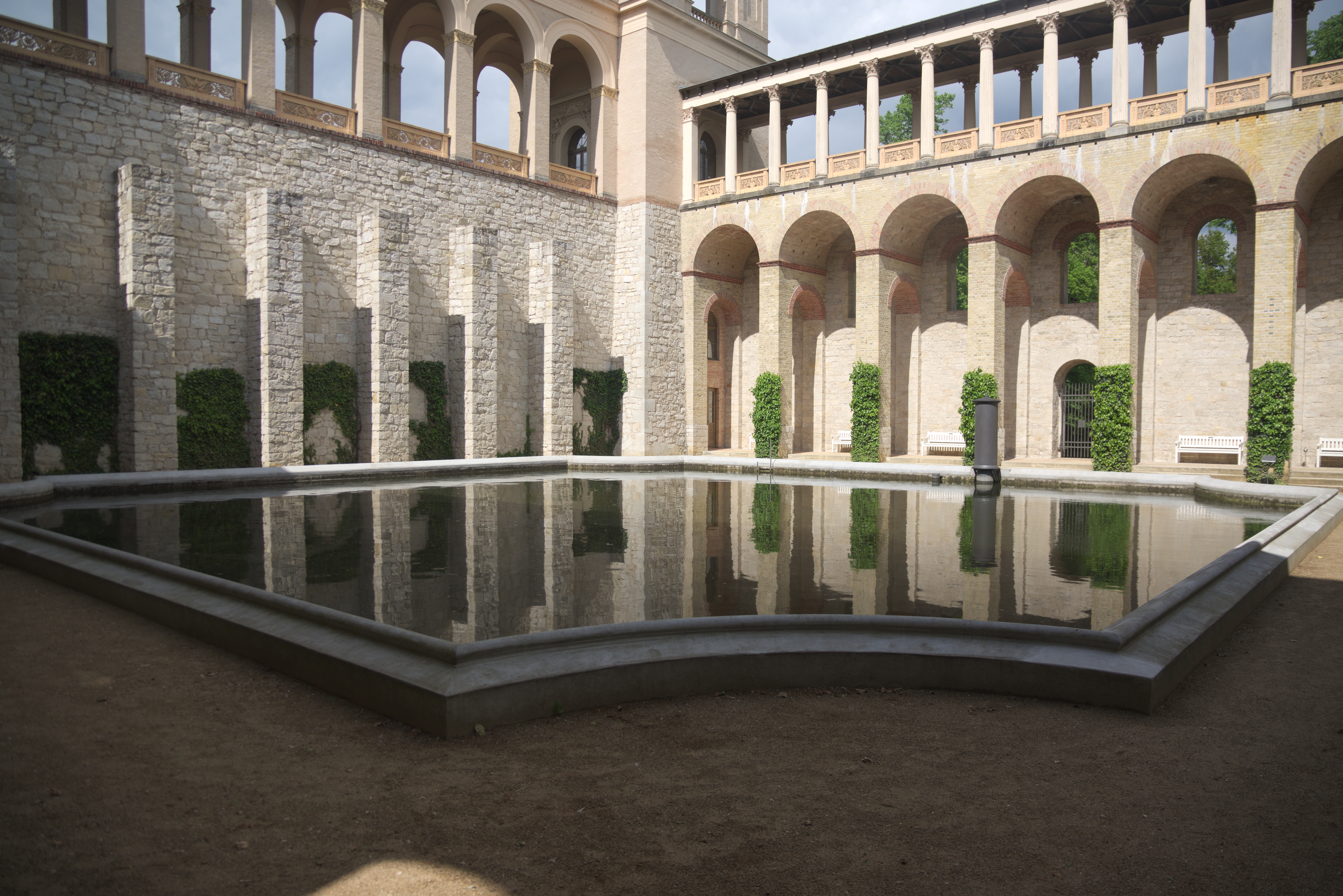
Interior courtyard

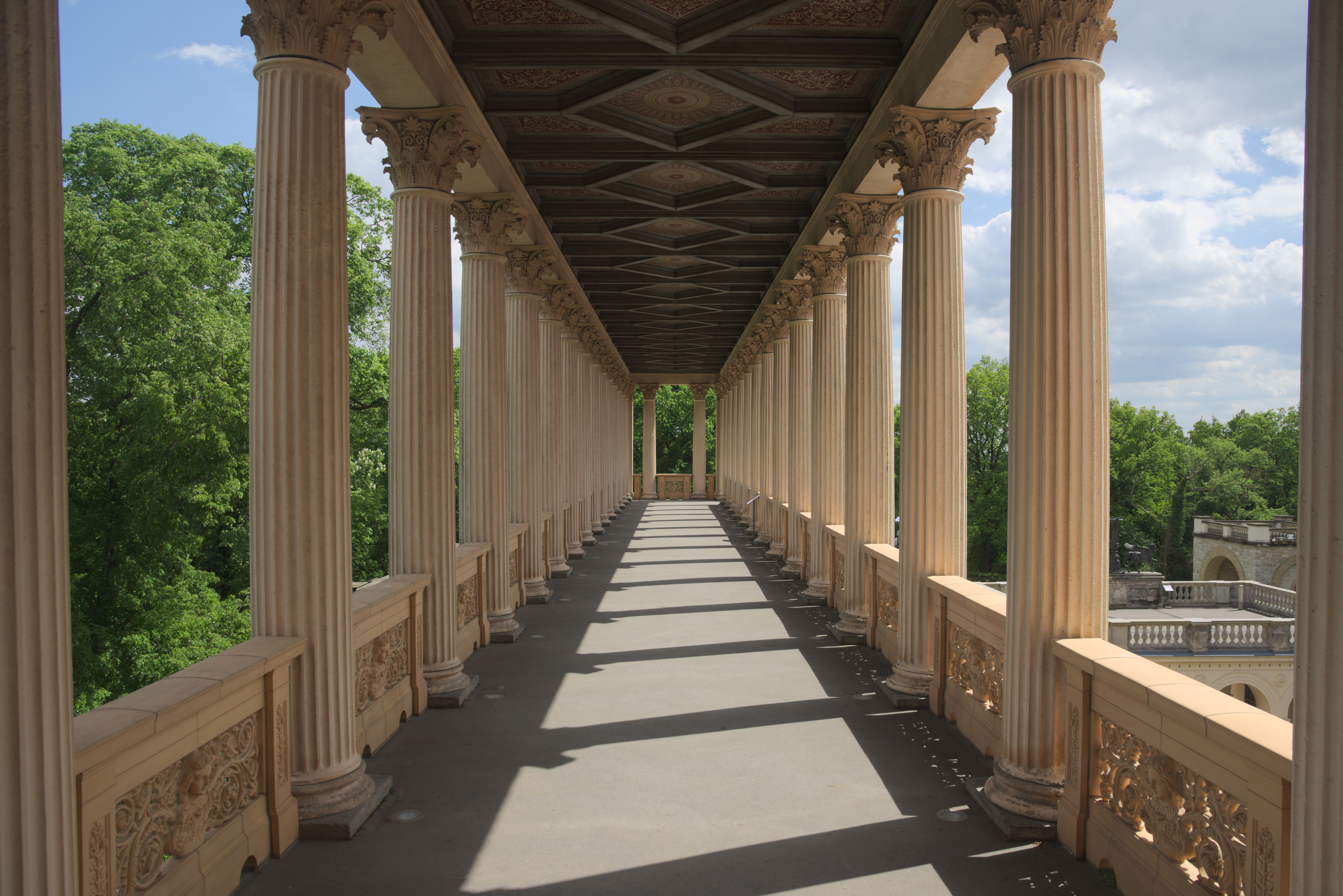
One of the two flanking Corinthian Colonnades

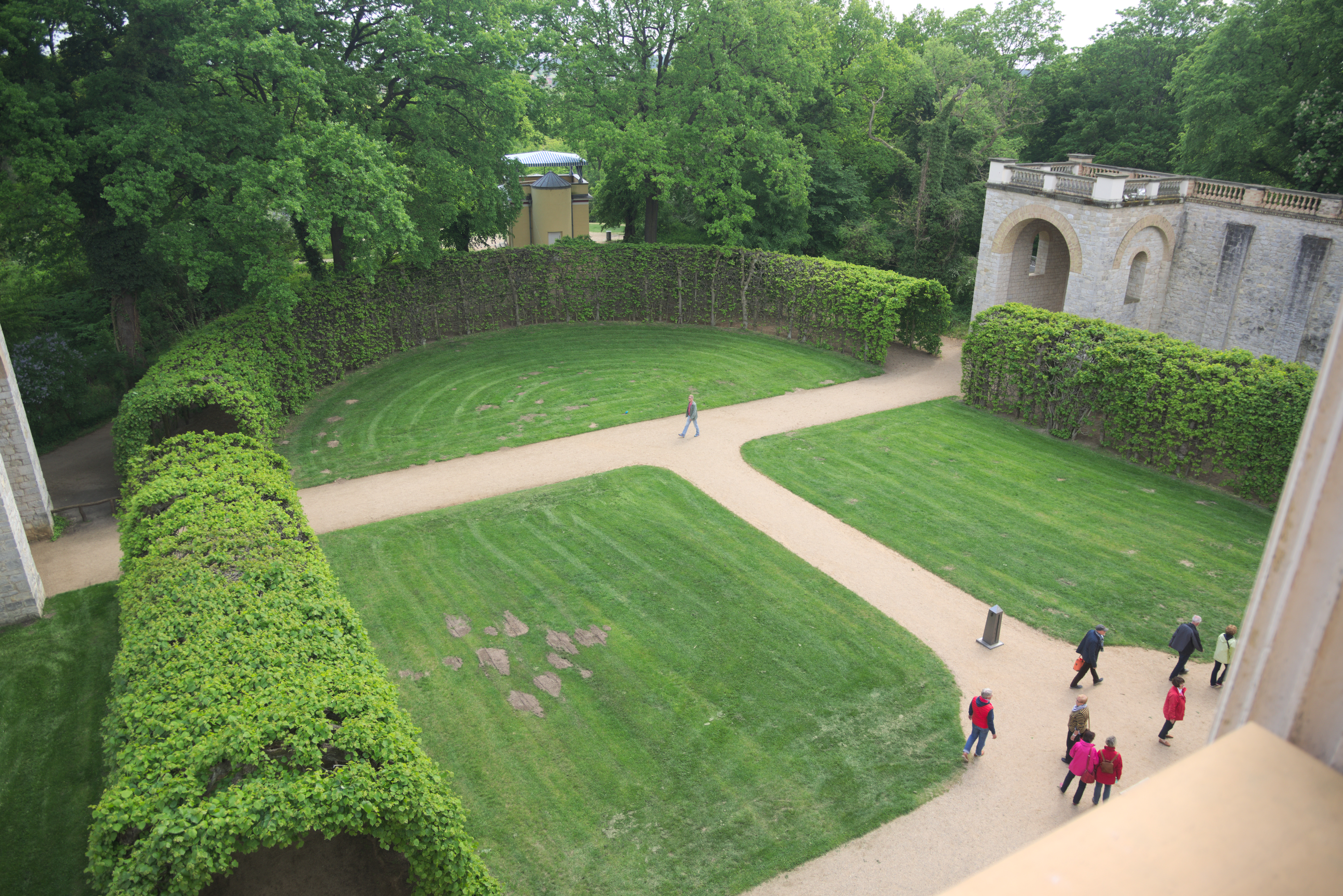
Front yard seen from above
