= Friedrich August Stüler =

Prussian architect and builder

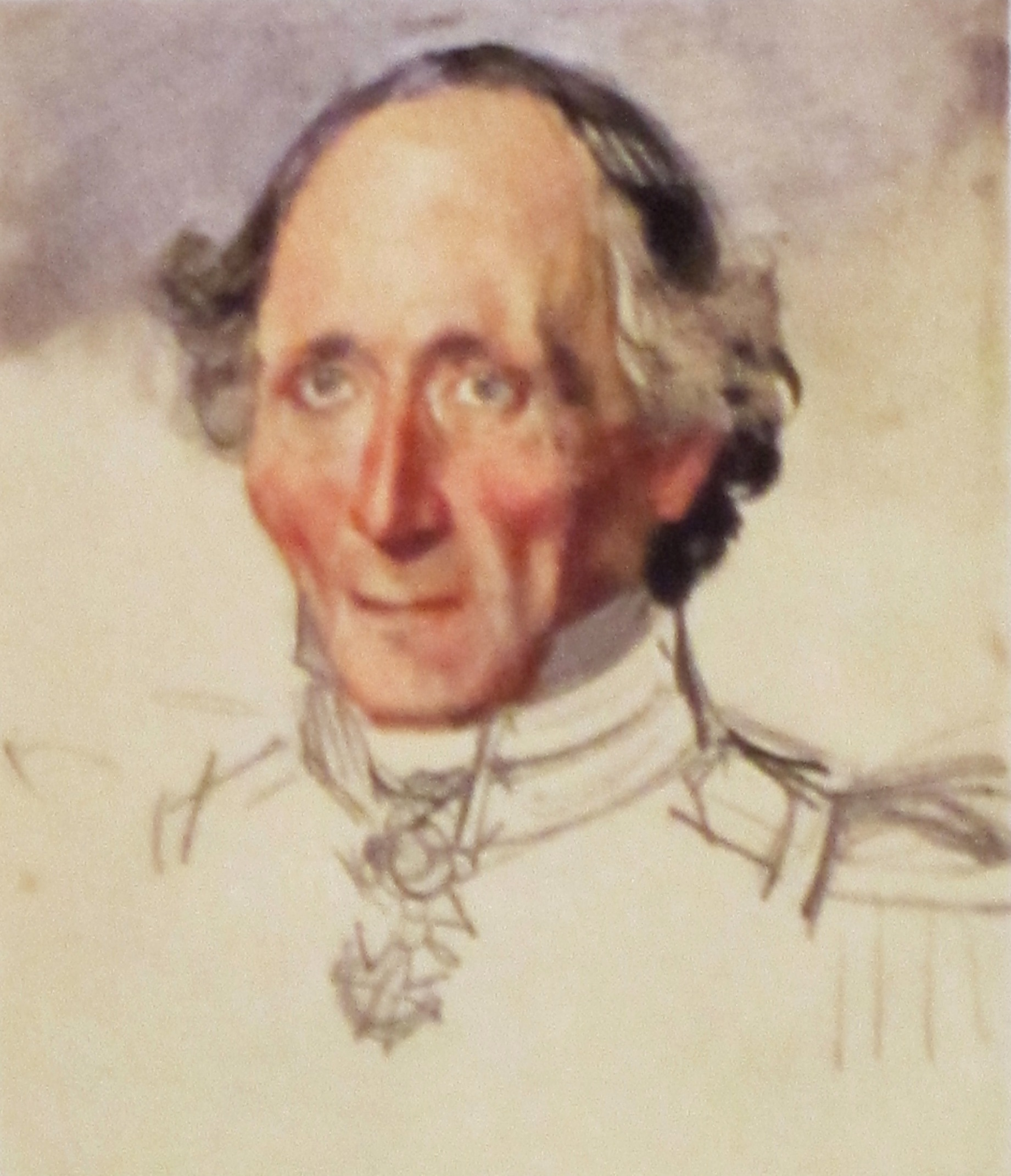
- Portrait of Stüler by Adolph Menzel, c. 1861
- Born: 28 January 1800; Free imperial city of Mühlhausen
- Died: 18 March 1865 (aged 65); Berlin, Province of Brandenburg, Kingdom of Prussia
- Resting place: Dorotheenstadt Cemetery
- Occupation: Architect
- Parents: Johann Gottfried Stüler (father); Johanna Friedericke Henriette Stüler née Reinhold (mother)
- Relatives: Ludwig Helmbold
- Buildings: Neues Museum

Friedrich August Stüler (28 January 1800 – 18 March 1865) was an influential Prussian architect and builder. His masterpiece is the Neues Museum in Berlin, as well as the dome of the triumphal arch of the main portal of the Berliner Schloss.

== Life ==
Stüler was born on 28 January 1800 in Mühlhausen. In 1818 he started studying architecture and became a student of Karl Friedrich Schinkel in Berlin. After travelling to France and Italy together with Eduard Knoblauch in 1829 and 1830 and to Russia together with Heinrich Strack in 1831, Stüler became Hofbauinspektor (Royal Buildings Inspector), Hofbaurat (Royal privy councillor for buildings) and director of the commission for the building of the Berliner Stadtschloss in 1832. In 1837, he planned the rebuilding of the Winter Palace in Saint Petersburg, but failed to realise these plans because Nicholas I decided to rebuild the original Baroque/Rococo palace instead of Stüler's Neo-Renaissance concept. Stüler then returned to Berlin, where Frederick William IV opened a huge array of tasks to him, making him Architekt des Königs (Royal architect) in 1842.

Together with Frederick William IV, who had previously (since his first journey to Italy in 1828) studied Italian architecture, Stüler incorporated Classical antiquity and Renaissance architecture in what was to become a Prussian Arcadia. They also conceived a recourse to early Christian motives such as the liturgy of the Early church to avoid political problems with the contemporary church. After the death of Ludwig Persius, Stüler assumed control of the building of the Church of Peace in Potsdam in 1845. The joint journeys to Italy of Stüler and Frederick William IV in 1858–59 deepened the Italian influence from medieval and Quattrocento buildings. His ideas for Cast-iron architecture or the techniques he used for the Neues Museum are more likely influenced from a journey to England in 1842. The building was badly damaged during World War II, but was reopened in 2009.

Stüler died in Berlin, where he is buried in the Dorotheenstadt cemetery.

== Works ==
While many of the buildings Stüler built were destroyed in World War II, a few were restored – not in the original ways, but one can still see Stülers concepts on the outside, especially in the Jakobi church in Berlin.

Commonly, Stüler is viewed as a student of Karl Friedrich Schinkel as well as an architect of his own right, combining the wishes of Frederick William IV, Schinkels Classicism and the new Historicism of the Wilhelminian era, though he didn't refer to himself as a student of Schinkel.

His works were:

- 1827–1831: probably restored the Dorfkirche Parchen
- 1837: Planned the restoration of the Winter Palace, Saint Petersburg
- 1834–1837: St. Peter und Paul auf Nikolskoje, Berlin-Zehlendorf
- 1839–1843: Schloss Alt-Autz, Auce, Latvia
- 1842: Converted the Kurfürstliches Schloss in Koblenz
- 1842–45: Addendum to the Franziskaner-Klosterkirche in Berlin
- 1843–44: Jagdschloss Letzlingen
- 1853–55: Dorfkirche in Basedow (Mecklenburg)
- 1843–1855: Neues Museum
- 1844–1845: St. Jacobi-Kirche in Berlin-Kreuzberg
- 1844–1863: University of Königsberg
- 1844–1846: St. Matthäus-Church, Berlin-Tiergarten
- around 1845: Royal Castle in Breslau, (destroyed 1945)
- 1845–1854: Friedenskirche in Potsdam
- 1845: Evangelical church in Wiehl-Drabenderhöhe
- 1845: plans for the Emanuelkirche, Schirwindt (dedicated 1856, destroyed 1944)
- 1846–1856: Interior design of the reconstructed Roman Palace auditorium (sog. Basilika), Trier, (destroyed)
- 1847–1853: Castle of the Fürsten Radolin in Jarotschin
- 1847–1863: Belvedere auf dem Pfingstberg, Potsdam
- 1848–1852: The village church of Caputh, Brandenburg
- City church St. Johannis in Niemegk
- 1848–1866: National Museum of Fine Arts in Stockholm
- 1850–1867: Burg Hohenzollern
- 1850: grave monument to lieutenant general Friedrich Wilhelm von Rauch on the Invalids´Cemetery in Berlin
- 1851–1864: Orangerie in Potsdam
- 1851: Triumphal gate am Mühlenberg, Potsdam
- 1851: Schwerin Castle
- 1853: St. Archangel Michael's Church in Rietavas, Lithuania
- 1851–1857: Bridge over the Vistula in Dirschau
- 1851–59: Two guard barracks across from the Charlottenburg Palace (now home to the Scharf-Gerstenberg Collection and the Berggruen Museum), Berlin
- 1852–1859: Barracks of the "Garde du Corps" across from Schloss Charlottenburg in Berlin-Charlottenburg
- 1853–1856: Restoration of the Lutherhaus in Lutherstadt Wittenberg
- 1854–1855: Bornstedter Kirche, Potsdam
- 1855–1861: Wallraf-Richartz-Museum, Cologne, (destroyed)
- 1857: Addendum to the Church St. Johannis in Berlin-Moabit, originally built by Schinkel (Portico, Colonnade, Vicarage and Steeple)
- 1857–1860: Trinitatis Church, Cologne
- 1858: Werdersche Kirche, Werder an der Havel
- 1858–1859: Dorfkirche in Stolpe, Berlin-Wannsee
- 1858–1874: Domkandidatenstift in Berlin-Mitte (completed by Stüve)
- 1859: Conversion of Schloss Prötzel
- 1859–1866: Neue Synagoge, Berlin-Mitte
- 1859–1861: The castle church of the Jagdschloss Letzlingen
- 1859–1862: Dorfkirche Pinnow (near Oranienburg)
- 1860–1864: Klassizistische Orangerie of the Zehnthof in Sinzig
- 1860: The village church of Dippmannsdorf
- 1862–1865: Hungarian Academy of Sciences, Budapest
- 1862–1876 Alte Nationalgalerie, Berlin-Mitte
- 1864–1866: St. Nicolai Church, Oranienburg
- 1864: Concept of the Zwölf-Apostel-Kirche (Twelve Apostles Church), Berlin-Schöneberg (built 1871–74 by Hermann Wilhelm Albert Blankenstein)
- 1865: Neustrelitz Palace, Neustrelitz (posthumous)
- 1867: The town church of Fehrbellin (posthumous)

== Gallery ==
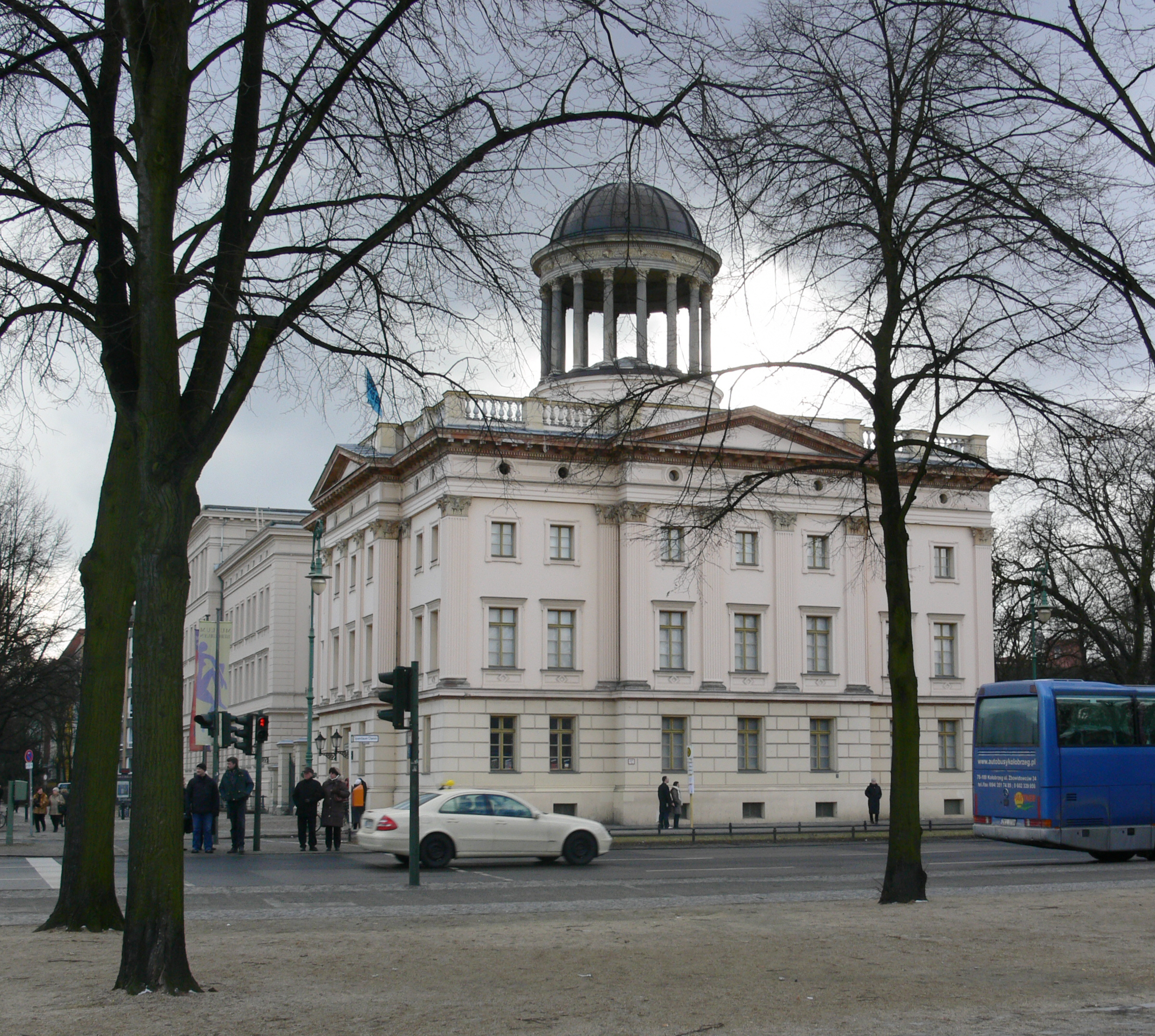
Museum Berggruen, Berlin

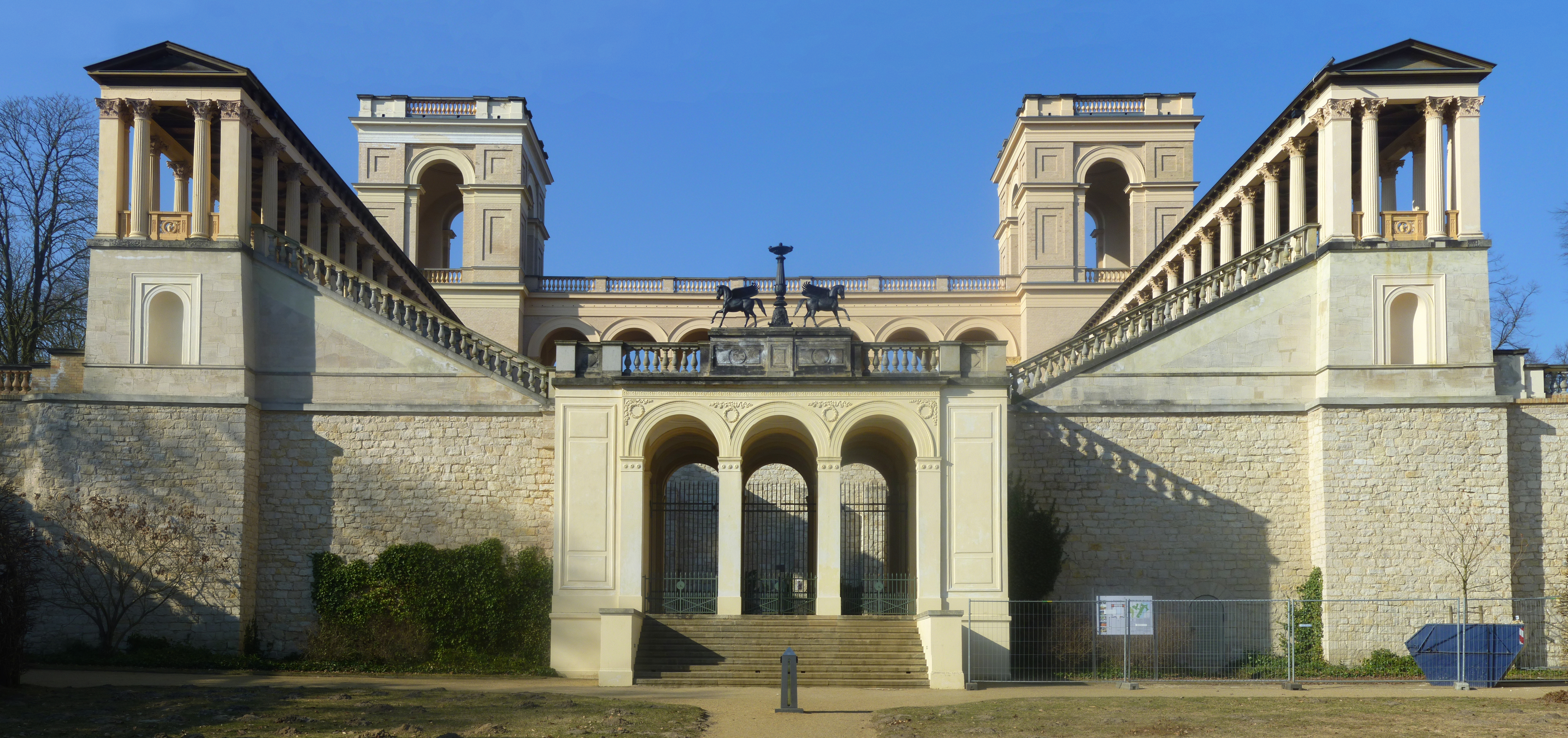
Belvedere auf dem Pfingstberg, Potsdam

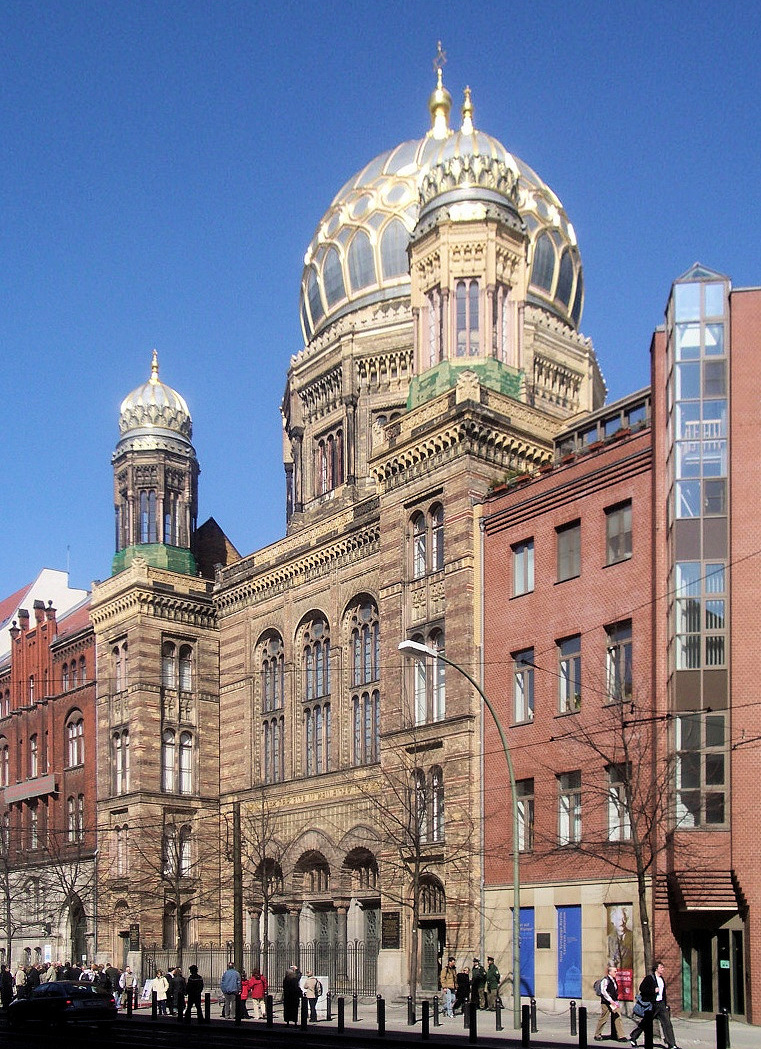
Neue Synagoge, Berlin

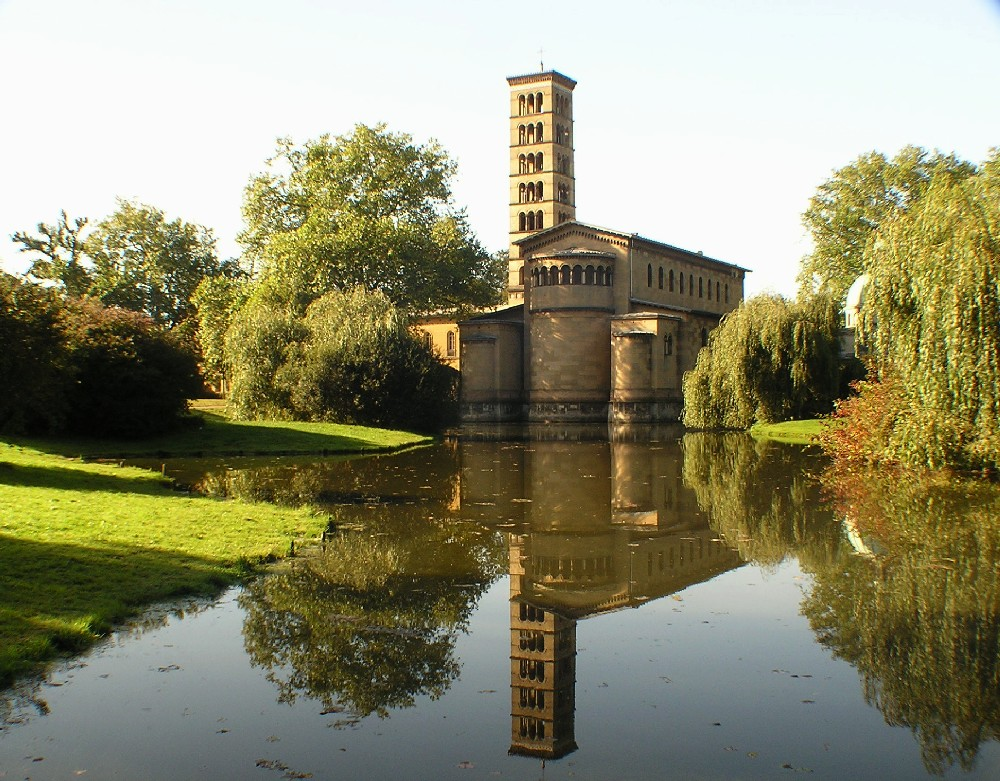
Friedenskirche, Potsdam

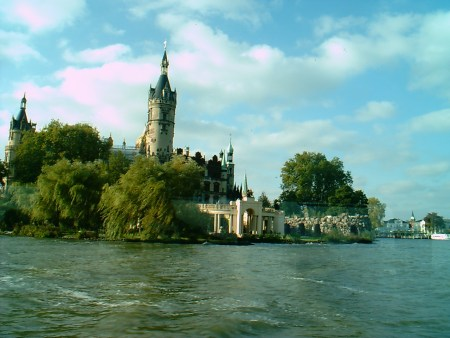
Schwerin Castle, taken from Lake Schwerin

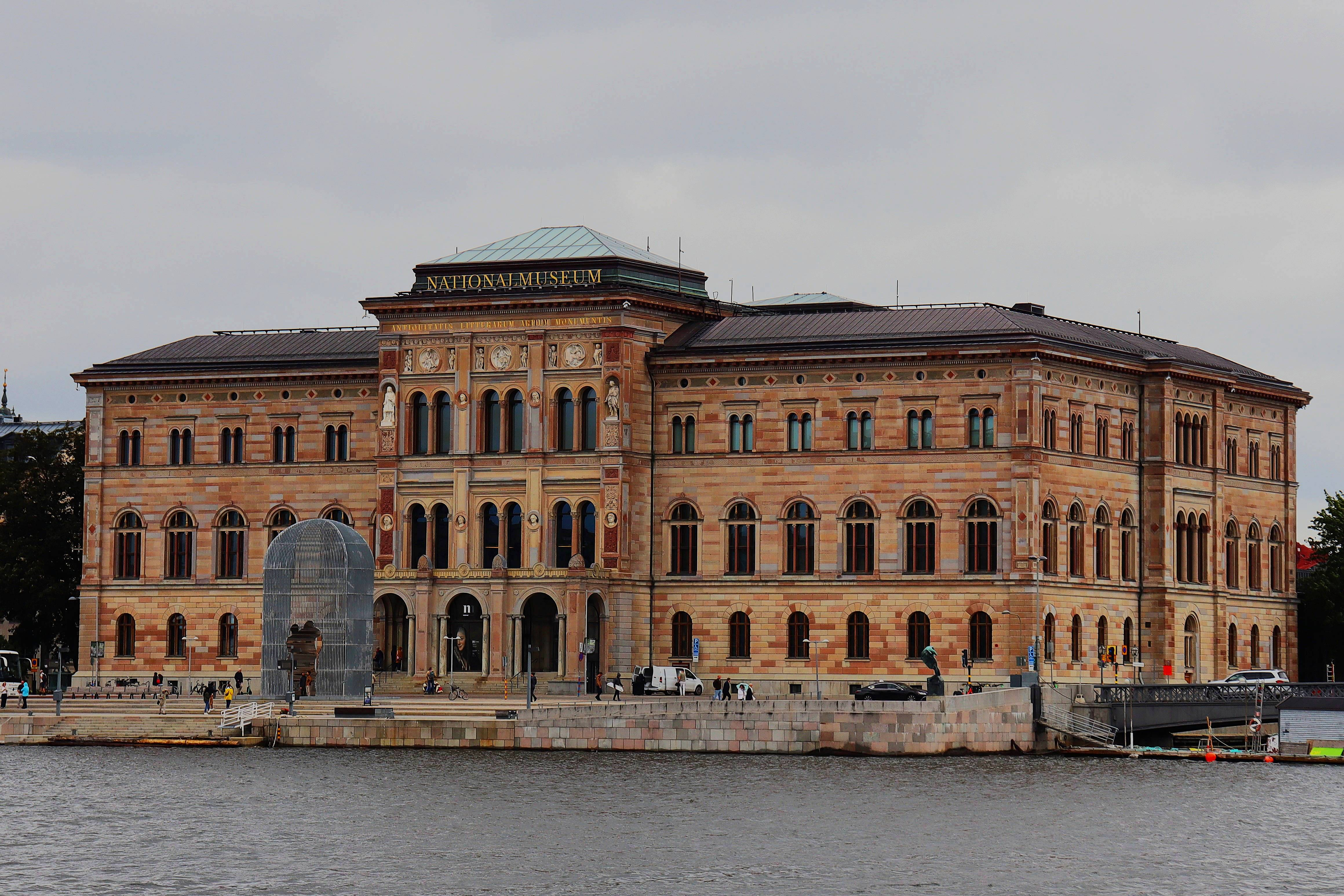
Nationalmuseum, Stockholm
