= Eduard Steinbrück =

German painter (1802–1882)

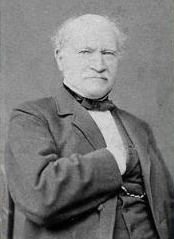
Eduard Steinbrück (c.1870)

Carl Eduard Steinbrück (2 May 1802, Magdeburg - 3 February 1882, Landeck) was a German history painter and etcher; associated with the Düsseldorf school.

== Biography ==
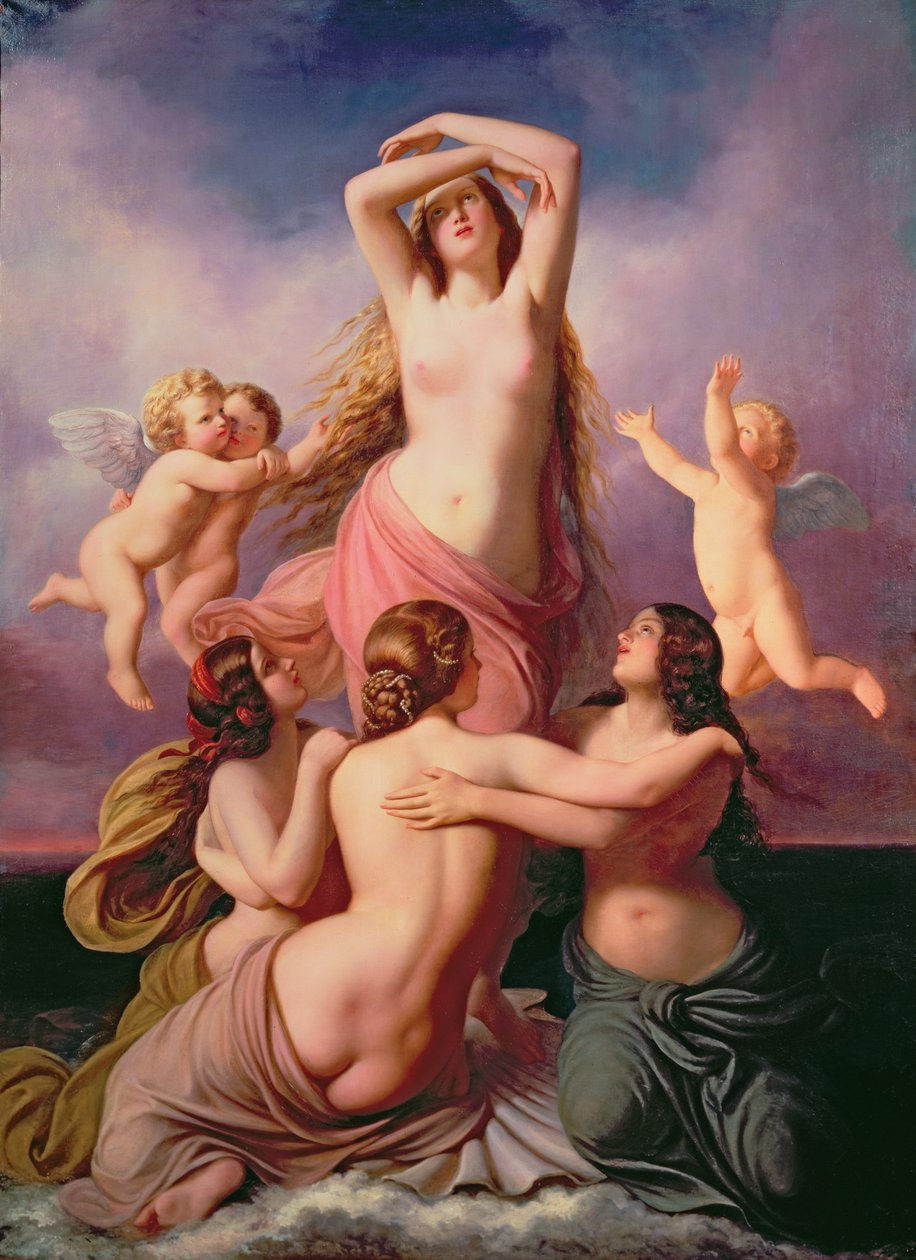
The Birth of Venus

His father was a merchant from Tangermünde and, in 1817, he became apprenticed to a businessman in Bremen. He eventually decided to follow his own inclinations and become a painter so, in 1822, he went to Berlin, where he worked in the studios of Wilhelm Wach. He produced his first independent paintings, on religious subjects, in 1825.

In 1829, he moved to Düsseldorf, where he mingled with the local artists. He then went to Rome, where he joined the German art community, and stayed until 1830. Upon returning to Germany, he married Amalia Martens and settled in Berlin. In 1833, he felt the need for improving his work and returned to Düsseldorf, where he studied with Friedrich Wilhelm von Schadow at the Kunstakadmie. During his time there, he sent his works to exhibitions in Berlin. After a major sale to the art dealer, Johann Gottfried Böker, who had a gallery in New York City, he focused much of his attention on the art market in the United States. In 1846 Amalia became seriously ill, and they returned to Berlin to be with her family. She died the following year, leaving him with three sons and a daughter.

In Berlin, King Frederick William IV gave him numerous commissions for works in public buildings and churches; beginning with frescoes in the chapel at Berlin Palace. Over the next few years, he would create works at the Neues Museum, the Church of Peace, Potsdam, St. Jacob's Church and St. Hedwig's Cathedral. He also produced what he considered to be his masterwork, "Die Magdeburger Jungfrauen", depicting a scene from the Sack of Magdeburg, which occupied him from 1852 to 1866.

In the early 1840s, he had become interested in Catholicism when his friend, Ernst Deger, gave him a book by Clemens Brentano: Das bittere Leiden unsers Herrn Jesu Christi (The Bitter Suffering of Our Lord Jesus Christ), which dealt with the life of the mystic, Anna Katharina Emmerick. In 1858, after a series of disagreements with the Protestant clergy, he formally converted for what he called 'reasons of conscience".

In 1863 he remarried, to Charlotte Witt. Over the next few years, he turned to painting idyllic works; featuring children, angels and fairies. In 1876, he retired to Landeck, a resort city he had visited during his summer vacations. He died there six years later.
