= Pfingstberg =

Hill in Brandenburg, Germany

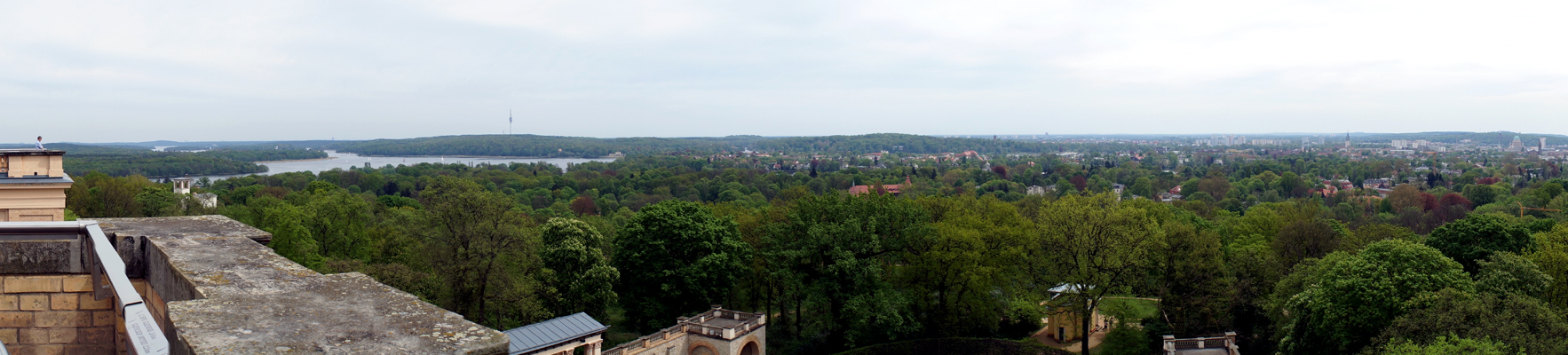

Highest point
- Elevation: 76 m above sea level (NHN) (249 ft)
- Coordinates: 52°25′N 13°03′E

Geography
- Location within Germany Location within Brandenburg

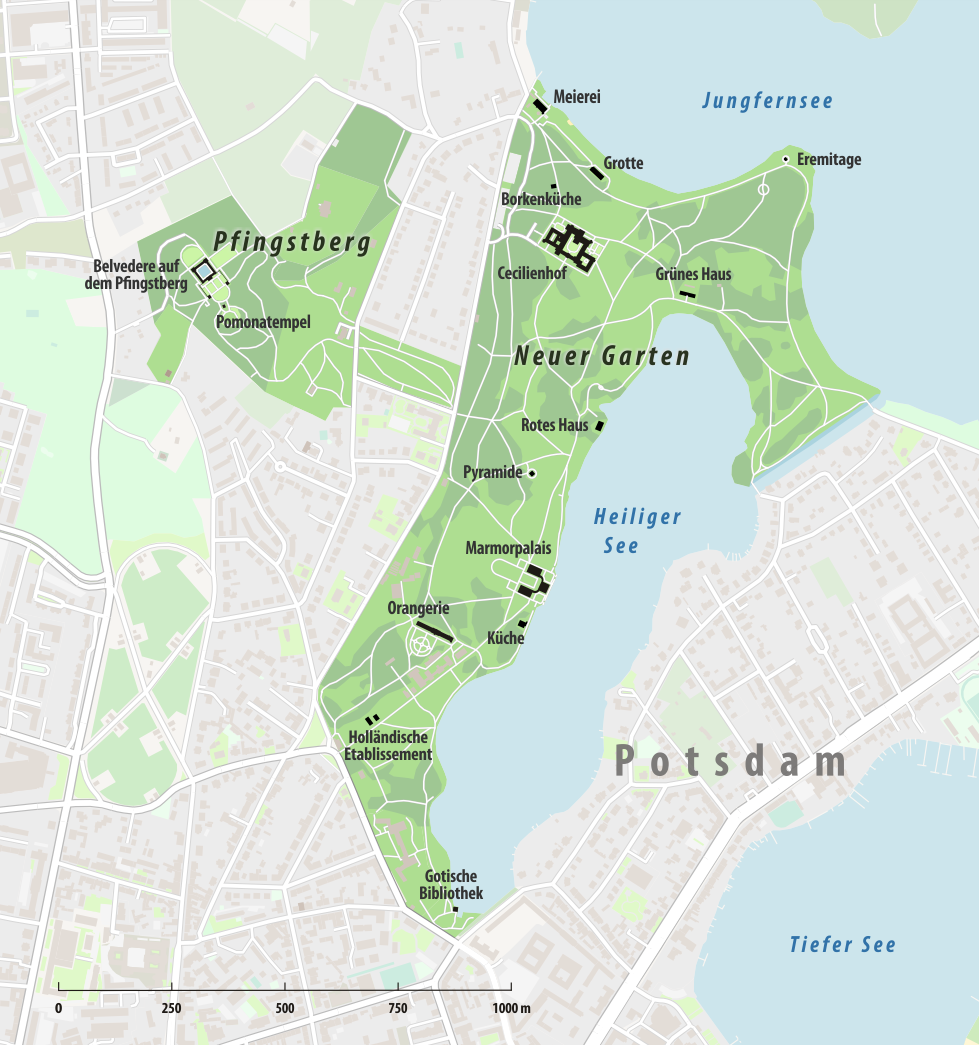
- Location
- Location: Brandenburg, Germany

Pfingstberg (German pronunciation: [ˈpfɪŋstˌbɛʁk]) is a hill in Brandenburg, Germany. The Belvedere auf dem Pfingstberg sits atop the hill.
