= Vecauce Manor =

Manor house in Latvia

Coordinates: 56°28′5.05″N 22°53′14.63″E

Vecauce manor
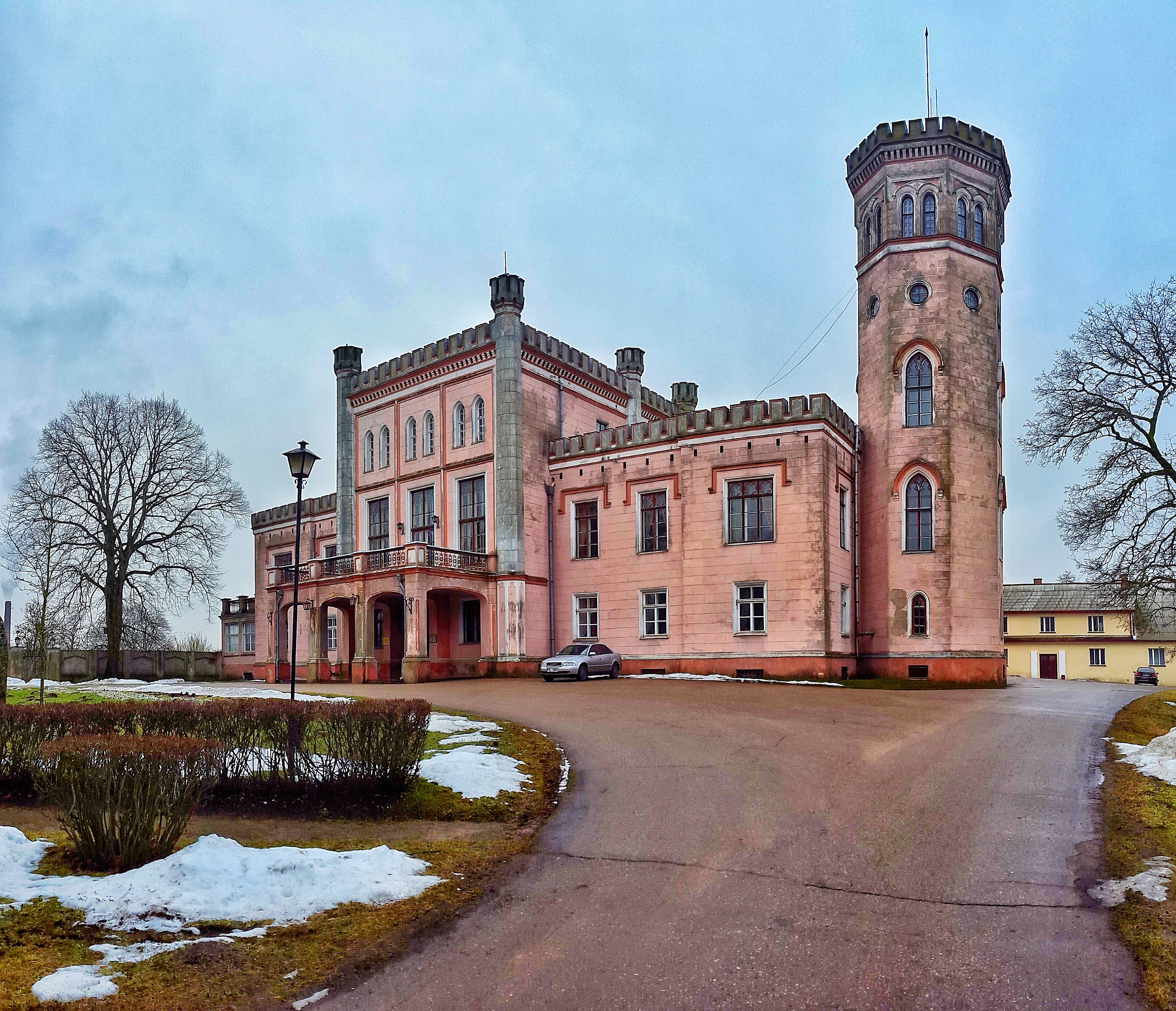
- Interactive map of the Vecauce manor area

General information
- Architectural style: Neo-Gothic
- Location: Dobele Municipality, Latvia
- Construction started: 1841
- Completed: 1845
- Client: Count Karl von Medem

Design and construction
- Architect: Friedrich August Stüler

Website
- http://www.vecauce.lv/

Vecauce Manor (Latvian: Vecauces muižas pils, German: Schloss Alt-Autz), also known as Auce Manor, is a manor house near the town of Auce in the Vecauce Parish of Dobele Municipality in the Semigallia region of Latvia originally designed by Friedrich August Stüler for Count Johan Friedrich von Medem and constructed between 1839 and 1843. Since 1920, the building has been used for education purposes and is currently run by the Latvia University of Life Sciences and Technologies.

== History ==
Vecauce Manor was designed by Friedrich August Stüler for Count Johan Friedrich von Medem, the construction began in 1839 and was completed in 1843. When the manor was built, Count Johan Fridrih fon Medem owned approximately 400 ha of arable land and few other manors in Zemgale.

During the Revolution of 1905, the manor was burned down. The Von Medem family restored the manor in 1907, but the interior was simplified and lost most of decorations. After the Latvian Agrarian reforms in 1920s, the manor was nationalized and became property of the University of Latvia. The manor was used as a place of practice for students of agriculture. During the Second World War, the manor was heavily damaged by Soviet and German military. After the war, the manor was taken over by Latvia University of Life Sciences and Technologies, who reconstructed the building. The manor lost most of the remaining interior as the rooms were replanned and adapted for educational purposes. Since 1956, all students of agronomy and zootechnics from Latvia University of Life Sciences and Technologies have studied their practical courses in Vecauce Manor. The university still owns the manor, and today it houses the study and research farm Vecauce.

== LLU Vecauce ==
LLU Vecauce works in multiple economic production sectors—animal husbandry, crop production, biogas production, fruit production, logging, woodworking, joinery, provision of services to the public (transport services, rental of premises for banquets and seminars, etc., catering services, utilities).

In 2007, "LLU Vecauce" expanded its farmed area to 2002 ha, of which 1772 ha where arable land which is used both used for planting cereal crops and corn for silage. The same year, a new sophisticated cattle farm was constructed, capable of holding 500 animals, the new farm is equipped with Swedish milking robots DeLaval. The total number of animals on the farm is around 1000 of which 500 are dairy cows and the rest are beef cows.

== See also ==
- List of palaces and manor houses in Latvia
