= Nike Assists the Wounded Warrior =

Sculpture in Berlin, Germany

- Nike richtet den Verwundeten auf (German)
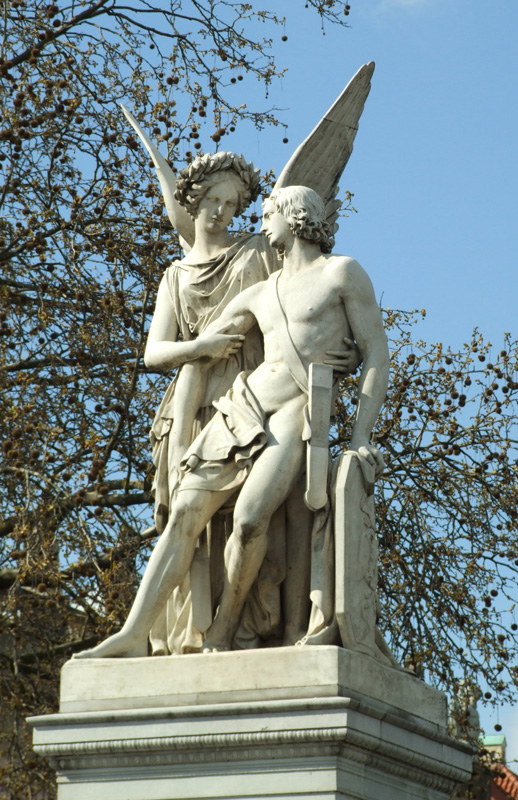
- The sculpture in 2008
- Artist: Ludwig Wilhelm Wichmann
- Year: 1853
- Type: Sculpture
- Location: Berlin, Germany

Nike Assists the Wounded Warrior (German: Nike richtet den Verwundeten auf) is an outdoor 1853 sculpture by Ludwig Wilhelm Wichmann, installed on Schlossbrücke in Berlin, Germany.

== See also ==
- 1853 in art
