= Ludwig Wilhelm Wichmann =

German sculptor (1788–1859)

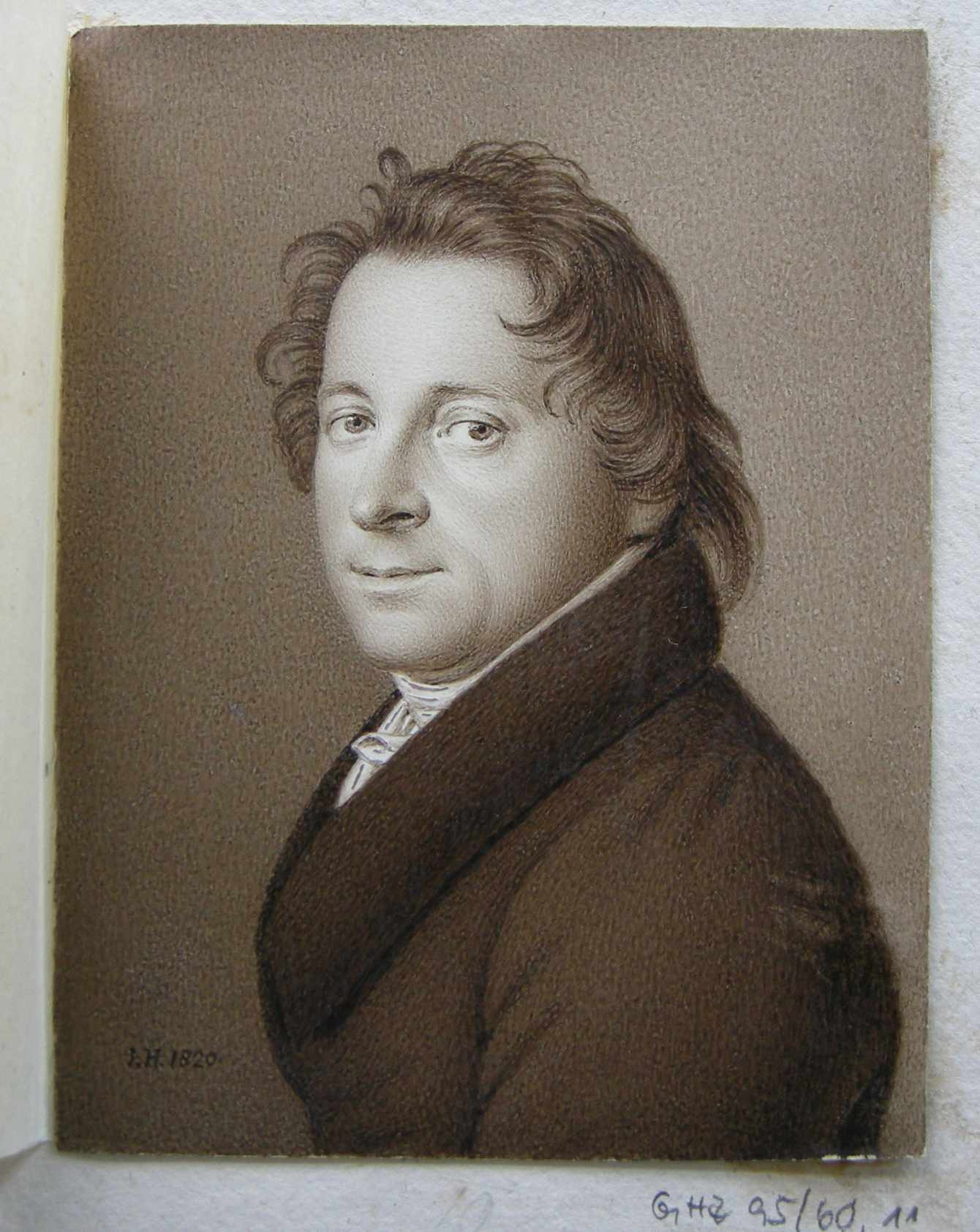
Ludwig Wilhelm Wichmann by Johann Heusinger (1820)

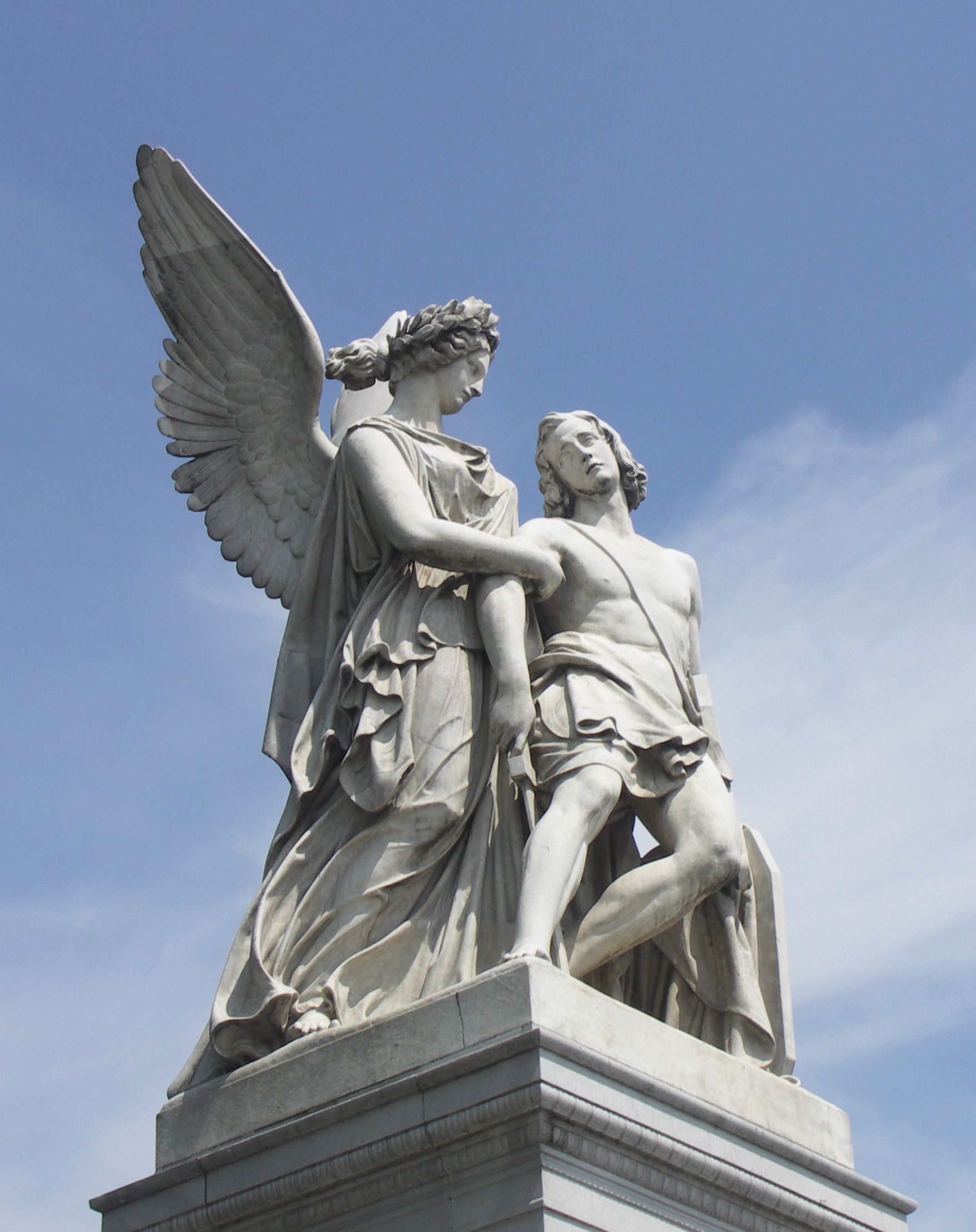
Nike Tending to the Wounded Warrior (1853)

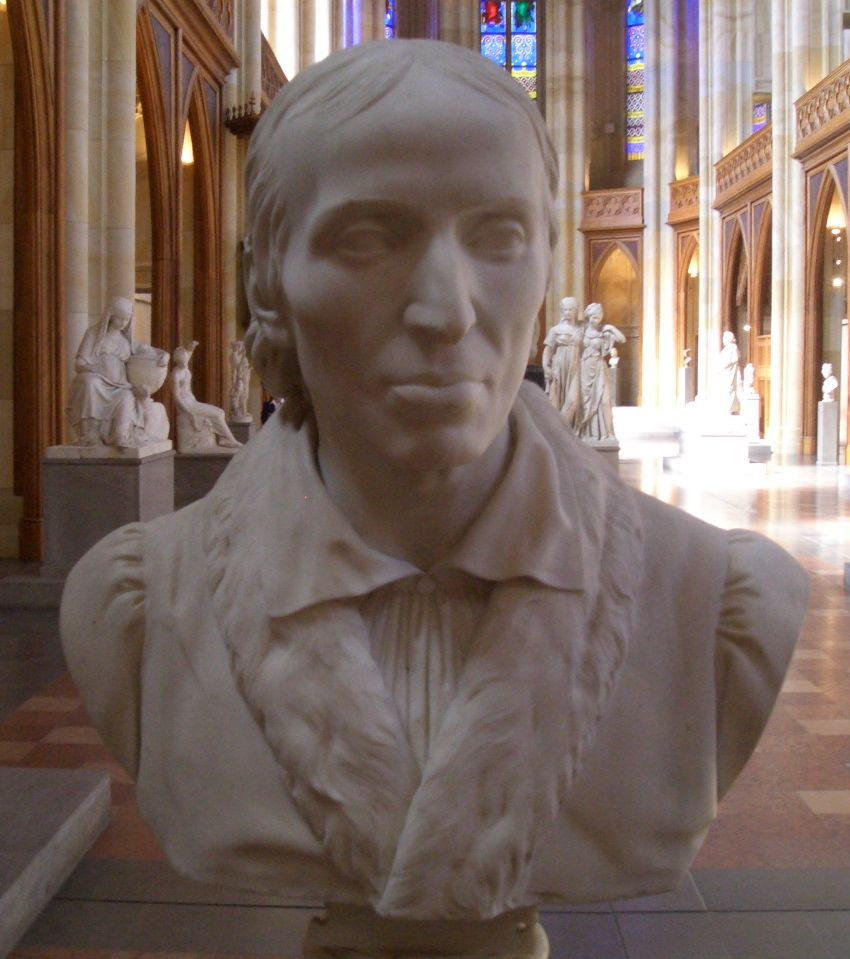
Bust of Tobias Feilner (1840)

Ludwig Wilhelm Wichmann (10 October 1788, Potsdam – 28 June 1859, Berlin) was a German sculptor. He specialized in making portrait busts.

== Life ==
From 1800, he was a pupil in the studios of Johann Gottfried Schadow. While there, he assisted in creating the Blücher Monument in Rostock and the Luther Monument in Wittenberg.

From 1809 to 1813 he lived in Paris, where he worked in the studios of François Joseph Bosio and Jacques-Louis David. When he returned to Berlin, he rejoined the staff at Schadow's workshop. From 1813 to 1815, he participated in the installation and finishing of the Prussian National Monument for the Liberation Wars (Nationaldenkmal für die Befreiungskriege), designed by Karl Friedrich Schinkel. Faced by approaching deadlines, Christian Daniel Rauch and Christian Friedrich Tieck appointed him to finish the designs of their two figures on the Monument: those representing the Battle of Katzbach and the Battle of Bar-sur-Aube. Following the death of Emanuel Bardou in 1818, Wichmann took over his classes at the Berlin School of Arts and Crafts. In 1819, he was named a member of the Prussian Academy of Arts.

He spent the years 1819 to 1821 in Italy with his older brother Karl, who was also a sculptor. On their return, they opened a studio that specialized in portrait busts. In 1832, Ludwig was appointed a Professor at the Prussian Academy. Over the years, he produced many designs and models for his father-in-law Tobias Feilner, a Master Potter and terracotta maker. The figure of the Archangel Michael in the Friedrichswerder Church is based on one of his clay models.

== Selected works ==
- 1827: Bust of Henriette Sontag, Mittelrhein-Museum, Koblenz
- 1831: Four female Greek figures. Acroteria in the Altes Museum, Berlin
- 1838: Bust of Friedrich Ancillon, National Gallery (Berlin)
- 1840–1850: Statue of Johann Joachim Winckelmann in Stendal (Bronze); also as a marble statue in the National Gallery.
- 1853: Figure group, Nike richtet den verwundeten Krieger auf (Nike Tending to the Wounded Warrior), Schloßbrücke (Castle Bridge) Berlin
