= Berlin-Schlachtensee station =

Railway station in Steglitz-Zehlendorf, Germany

Coordinates: 52.4399°N 13.2149°E

Berlin-Schlachtensee
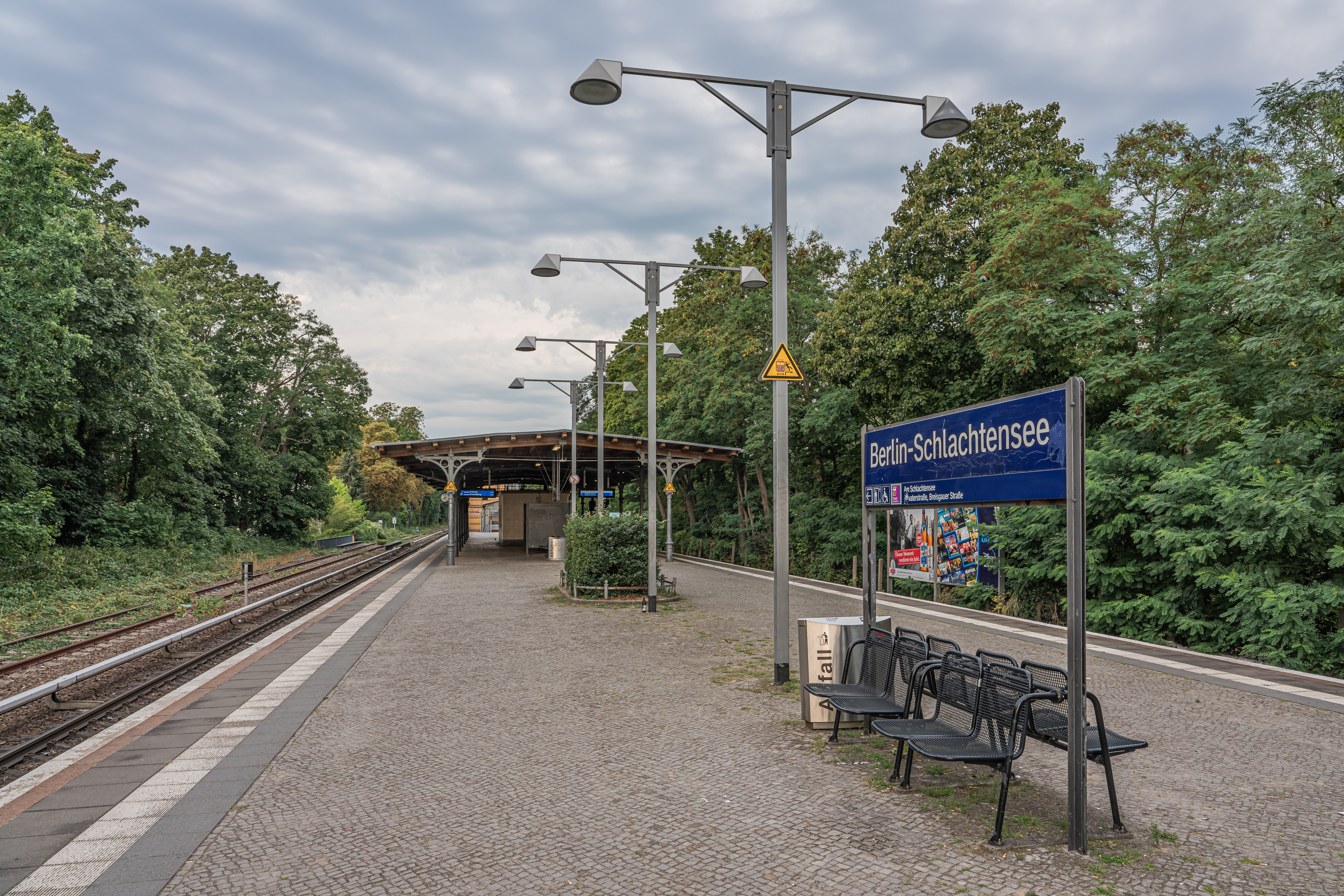

General information
- Location: Steglitz-Zehlendorf, Berlin, Berlin; Germany

Other information
- Station code: 0557
- DS100 code: BSLS
- Category: 4
- Fare zone: VBB: Berlin B/5656

Services
Preceding station	Berlin S-Bahn	Following station
Mexikoplatz towards Oranienburg	S1	Nikolassee towards Wannsee
Location
- Location within Berlin

Berlin-Schlachtensee (in German Bahnhof Berlin-Schlachtensee) is a railway station in the Schlachtensee quarter in the district Steglitz-Zehlendorf of Berlin, Germany. It is served by the Berlin S-Bahn.

The station is south of the lake Schlachtensee and was opened in 1874. The service was temporarily suspended because of the low use because of the S-Bahn-Boykott during the Cold War, to demonstrate against the GDR who also operated the S-Bahn in the west of berlin, despite the wall. In 1970, the tracks were dismantled. It was not until 1985 that operations could be resumed.
