= Sprengplatz Grunewald =

Area of Grunewald forest, in Berlin

Coordinates: 52.466°N 13.221°E

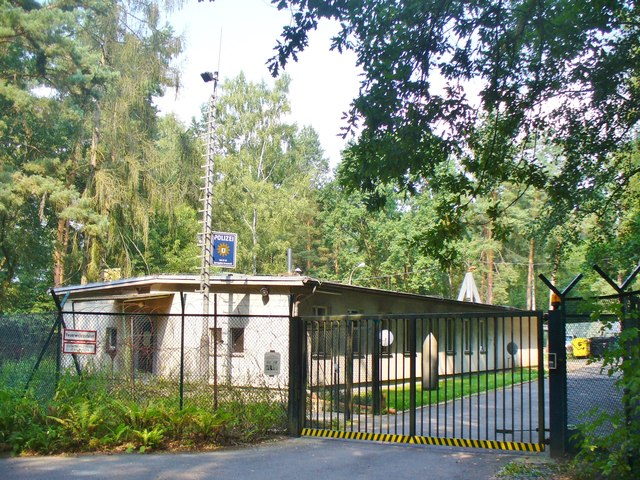
Administrative building and reception area, at Kronprinzessinnenweg

Sprengplatz Grunewald is the name of an area of about 200 by 200 metres (660 ft × 660 ft), located in the Grunewald forest, in Berlin. It is part of Nikolassee, of Steglitz-Zehlendorf. Since 1950, the area has been used to store ammunition. It is also used for detonating ammunition, in a controlled setting. The site also accepts ammunition that has been found, and that needs to be removed safely. Berlin Police have a special unit responsible for this.

== Use ==
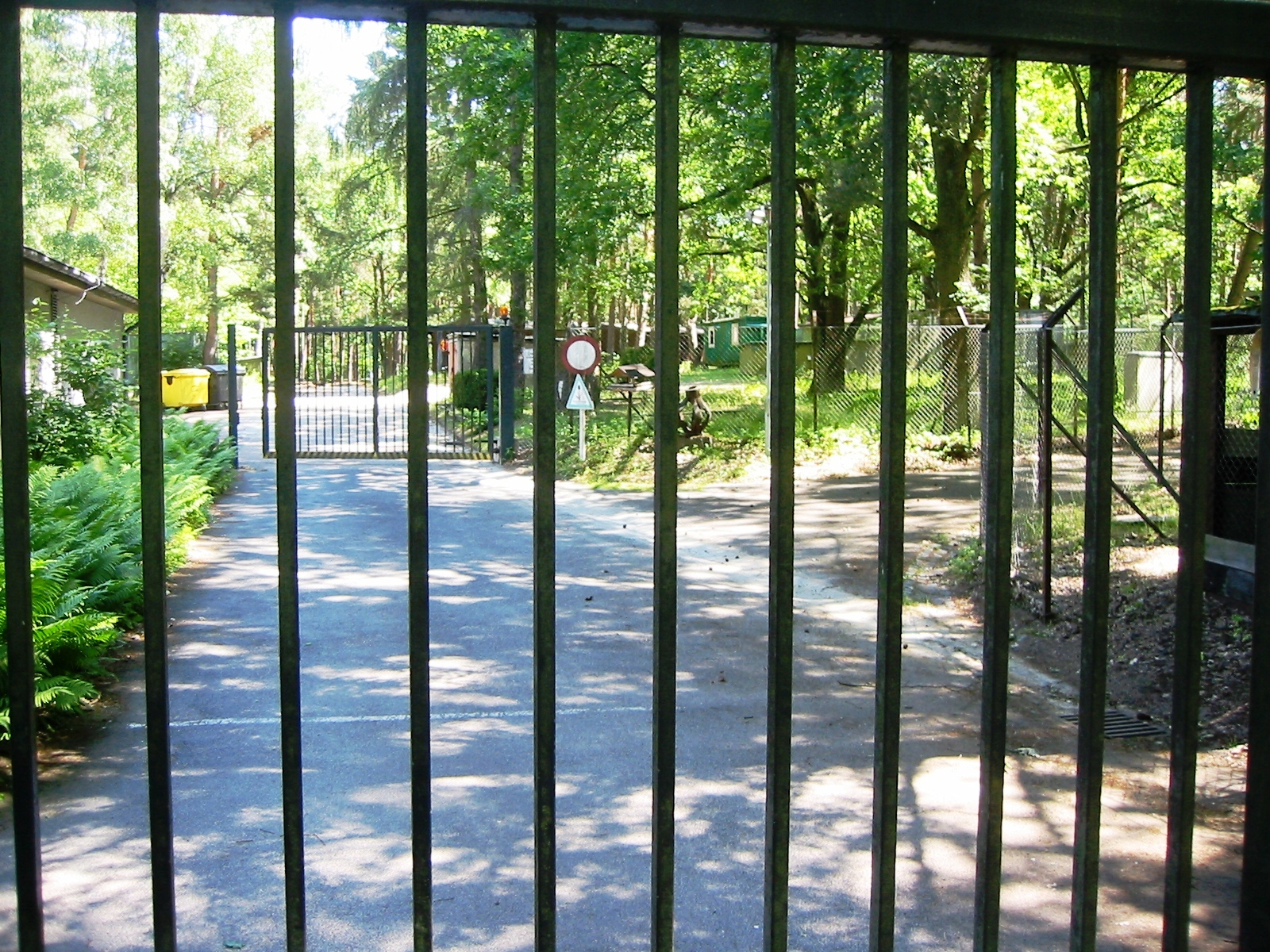
Entrance, in Berlin-Nikolassee

The site was created in 1950, mainly to safely dispose of ammunition found after the Second World War. At the time, most were unexploded bombs found around the city. In the 2020s, there are between six and eight large detonation events per year. There are also about seventy smaller blast events, per year. The latter are mainly used to safely dispose of unexploded ordnances, as well as for training. In 2004, operating the site cost around a million euros; in 2022, operation expenses were about half a million Euros.

== Situation ==
The site is located in Grunewald forest, near the exit Hüttenweg, about 600 metres (2,000 ft) from highway A 115. When the site is used for larger-scale detonations, this also means that a section of the highway is closed, for safety reasons.

== Fire ==
There was an unintended detonation at the site, in the morning hours of August 4, 2022. This detonation caused other explosions, which put the surrounding forest on fire. Because of very dry weather conditions, the fire spread. Because of the fire, several lines of Berlin S-Bahn were disrupted. Longer range trains had to be diverted, the Avus highway was closed. In the afternoon of August 6, railway lines could again operate normally, but the highway remained closed.

The fire also led to a public discussion, whether a site such as Sprengplatz Grunewald should really be near a site which many people use for recreation, and which is near traffic axes such as Wetzlarer Bahn and Avus. Berlin's mayor at the time, Franziska Giffey, said that moving the site to Brandenburg should be contemplated. Barbara Slowik, head of the Berlin Police, supported the continued use of the site, citing the dangers of transporting unexploded munitions over long distances, as well as a lack of suitable alternatives within the city limits. She further stated the police remain open to co-operating with the state of Brandenburg, which operates a similar detonation site at Kummersdorf, about 50 km south of Berlin.
