= Düppel =

Düppel can refer to:

- The German name for Dybbøl, a town in Denmark famed for an 1864 battle
- Düppel (Berlin), a forest and neighbourhood in Berlin, Germany
- Chaff (radar countermeasure), historically known as Düppel after the neighborhood in which it was developed during World War 2
