= Schlachtensee (locality) =

- Quarter of Berlin
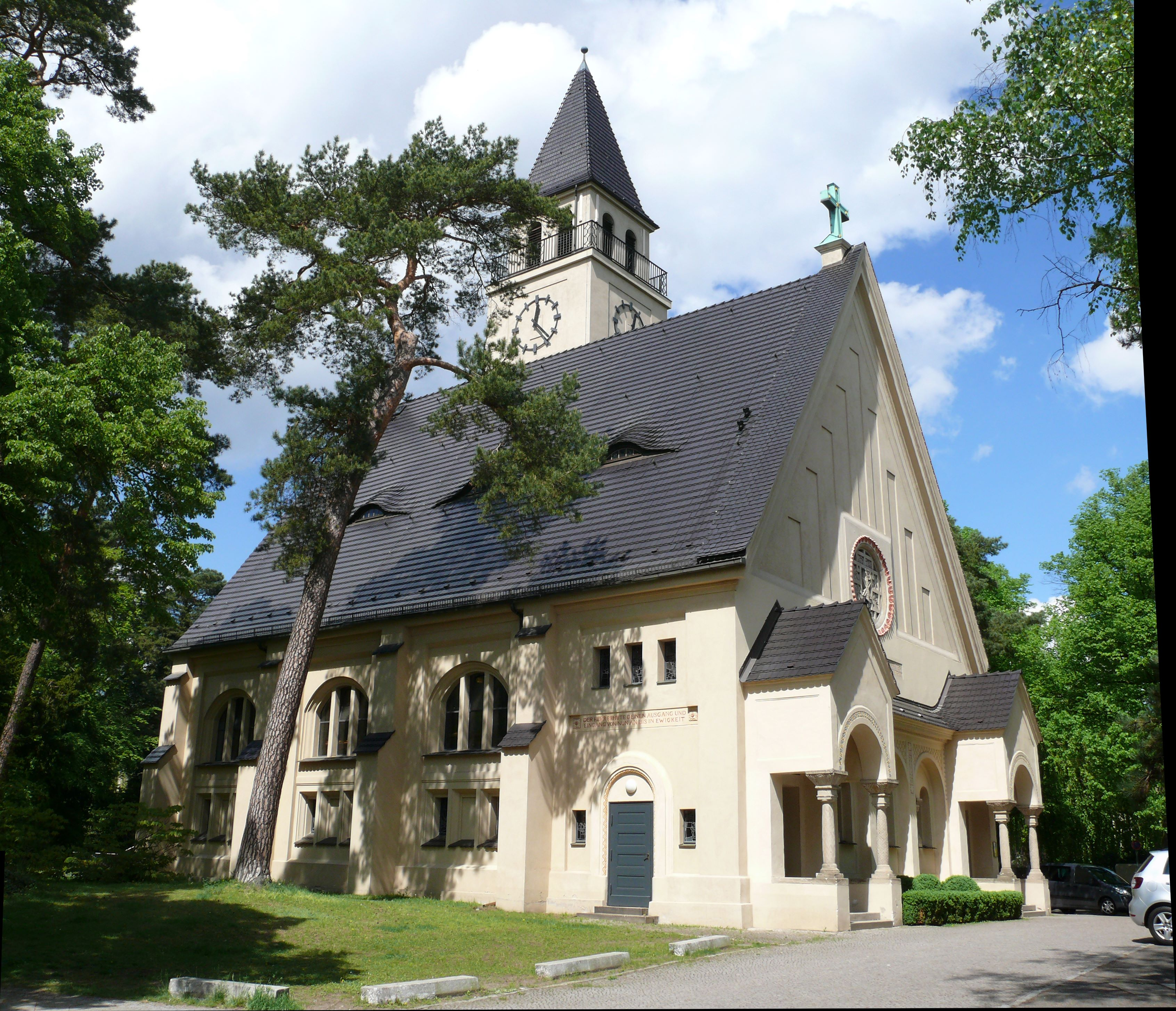
- Johannes church in Schlachtensee

- Location of Schlachtensee within Berlin
- Interactive map of Schlachtensee
- Location within Germany Location within Berlin
- Coordinates: 52°26′10″N 13°13′00″E
- Country: Germany
- State: Berlin
- City: Berlin
- Borough: Steglitz-Zehlendorf

Area
  - Total: 4.0 km^{2} (1.5 sq mi)

Population (2024-12-31)
  - Total: 10,354
  - Density: 2,600/km^{2} (6,700/sq mi)
- Time zone: UTC+01:00 (CET)
  - Summer (DST): UTC+02:00 (CEST)
- Postal codes: 14129, 14163
- Vehicle registration: B

Schlachtensee (German pronunciation: [ˈʃlaxtn̩ˌzeː]) is a locality within the borough of Steglitz-Zehlendorf in Berlin. It was formed as a new administrative district in 2020, combining parts of the Nikolassee and Zehlendorf localities.

== History ==
In the Middle Ages, the village of Slatdorp existed on the southern shore of Schlachtensee, but it fell desolate after 1300. The first buildings of modern times were the Old Fishing Lodge, built in 1759 on the northwestern shore of Schlachtensee, and the New Fishing Lodge, built in 1853 on the southern shore. Otherwise, the present district consisted of unsettled forest and farmland until well into the 19th century.

In the late 19th century, a small train station on the Wannsee railway line was built south of Schlachtensee lake. A private development company bought the land south of the station and incorporated it into Zehlendorf. Under the name "Landhausgemeinde Schlachtensee", small country houses, containing around 3 to 4 rooms each, were built for the (lower) middle class. Later, larger houses and mansions were built north of Spanische Allee ("Spanish Avenue"), as part of a new mansion settlement within the administrative district of Nikolassee. Around this time, many small businesses started opening up around Breisgauer Straße, today's commercial center of Schlachtensee.

In May 2020, the district council of the Steglitz-Zehlendorf district approved a citizens' initiative to establish a separate Locality of Schlachtensee. The new Locality was formed from parts of the existing localitys of Nikolassee and Zehlendorf with an announcement in the Official Gazette for Berlin on 11 December 2020.

== Transport ==
Schlachtensee is connected to the Berlin S-Bahn commuter rail network by its station on the S1 line.
