= Wannsee =

- Quarter of Berlin
- Location of Wannsee in Steglitz-Zehlendorf and Berlin
- Interactive map of Wannsee
- Location within Germany Location within Berlin
- Coordinates: 52°25′00″N 13°09′00″E
- Country: Germany
- State: Berlin
- City: Berlin
- Borough: Steglitz-Zehlendorf
- Founded: 1870
- Subdivisions: 5 zones

Area
  - Total: 23.7 km^{2} (9.2 sq mi)
- Elevation: 103 m (338 ft)

Population (2024-12-31)
  - Total: 10,188
  - Density: 430/km^{2} (1,110/sq mi)
- Time zone: UTC+01:00 (CET)
  - Summer (DST): UTC+02:00 (CEST)
- Postal codes: 14109
- Vehicle registration: B

Wannsee (German pronunciation: [ˈvanˌzeː]) is a locality in the southwestern Berlin borough of Steglitz-Zehlendorf, Germany. It is the westernmost locality of Berlin. In the quarter there are two lakes, the larger Großer Wannsee (Greater Wannsee) and the Kleiner Wannsee (Little Wannsee), located on the Havel and separated by the Wannsee Bridge. The larger of the two lakes covers an area of 2.7 km^{2} (1.0 mi^{2}) and has a maximum depth of 9 m (30 ft).

== Geography ==
=== Overview ===
At the western rim of the Wannsee locality the Glienicke Bridge connects it with the city of Potsdam. The late neoclassical Glienicke Palace as well as the Pfaueninsel are nearby. Since 1990 these palaces and parks have formed part of the Palaces and Parks of Potsdam and Berlin UNESCO World Heritage Site.

The locality is centred on the ancient village of Stolpe, known to exist in 1299. The locality also includes the districts of Kohlhasenbrück (named after the 1811 novella Michael Kohlhaas by Heinrich von Kleist) and Steinstücken, which in Cold War days became famous as a tiny exclave of West Berlin within the GDR.

=== Großer and Kleiner Wannsee ===
Wannsee lake is a bathing and recreation spot for western Berlin. The Strandbad Wannsee, an open-air lido with one of the longest inland beaches in Europe and a nudist area, was built in 1929–1930 after a concept by architect Richard Ermisch. Situated on the eastern shore of the lake it is officially part of the Nikolassee locality.

== History ==
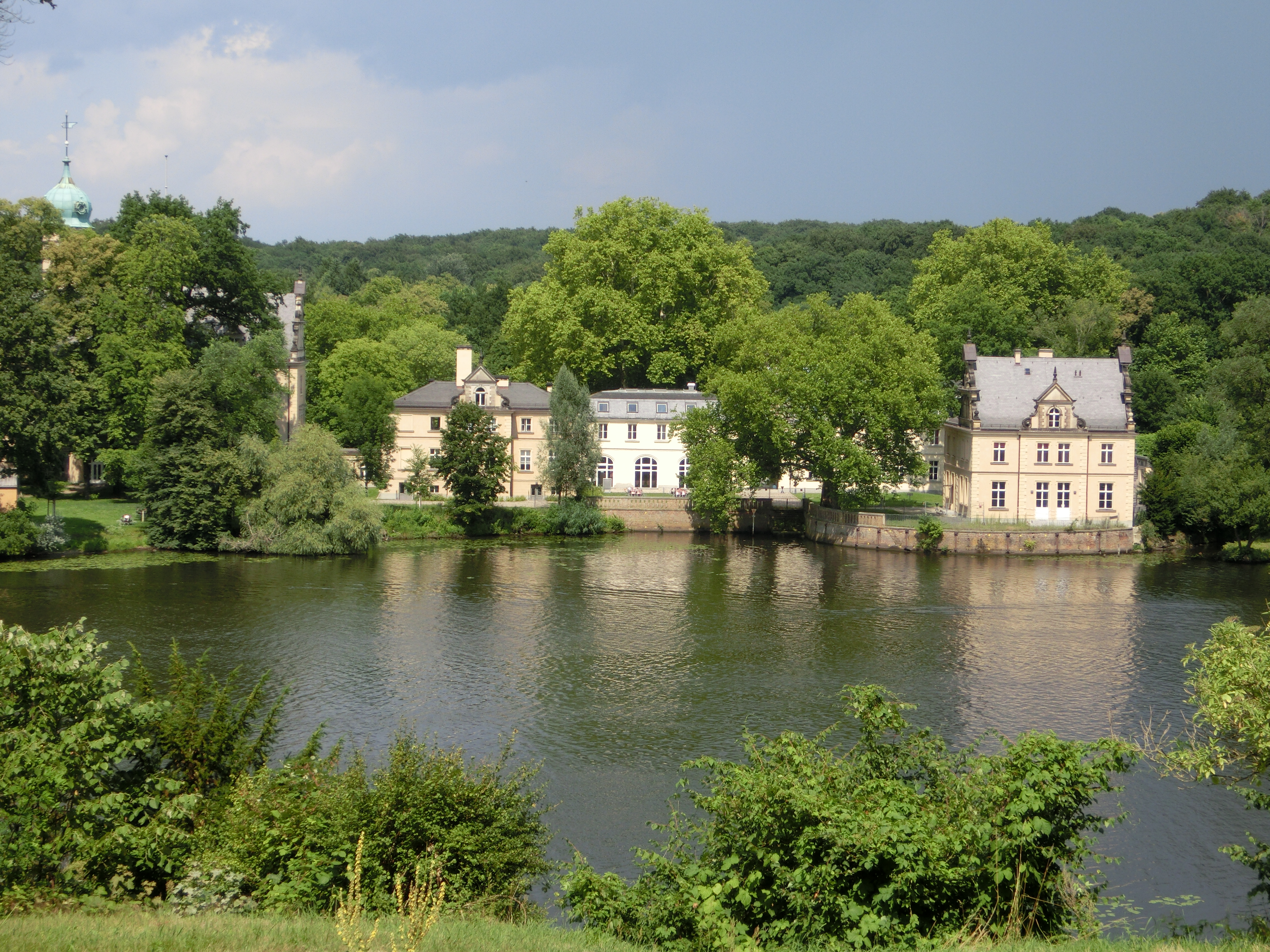
Jagdschloss Glienicke at the Havel river

The history of Wannsee as an attractive suburb of Berlin began when "Great Elector" Frederick William of Brandenburg ordered the construction of a hunting lodge, the Jagdschloss Glienicke. The castle remained the hunting lodge of the Hohenzollern family for generations, and was rebuilt and expanded several times. Today, the castle houses an institute for social education.

In 1793, the Prussian king Frederick William II, a descendant of Frederick William, acquired the island Pfaueninsel (German: "Peacock Island") in the Havel river and had the Pfaueninsel castle built for himself and his mistress Wilhelmine Enke in 1794–1797. Jagdschloss Glienicke and Pfaueninsel castle are both part of the UNESCO World Heritage Site Palaces and Parks of Potsdam and Berlin.

On 21 November 1811, German writer Heinrich von Kleist shot himself on the shore of the Kleiner Wannsee and, at her bidding, his lover, Henriette Vogel. A memorial marks the site.

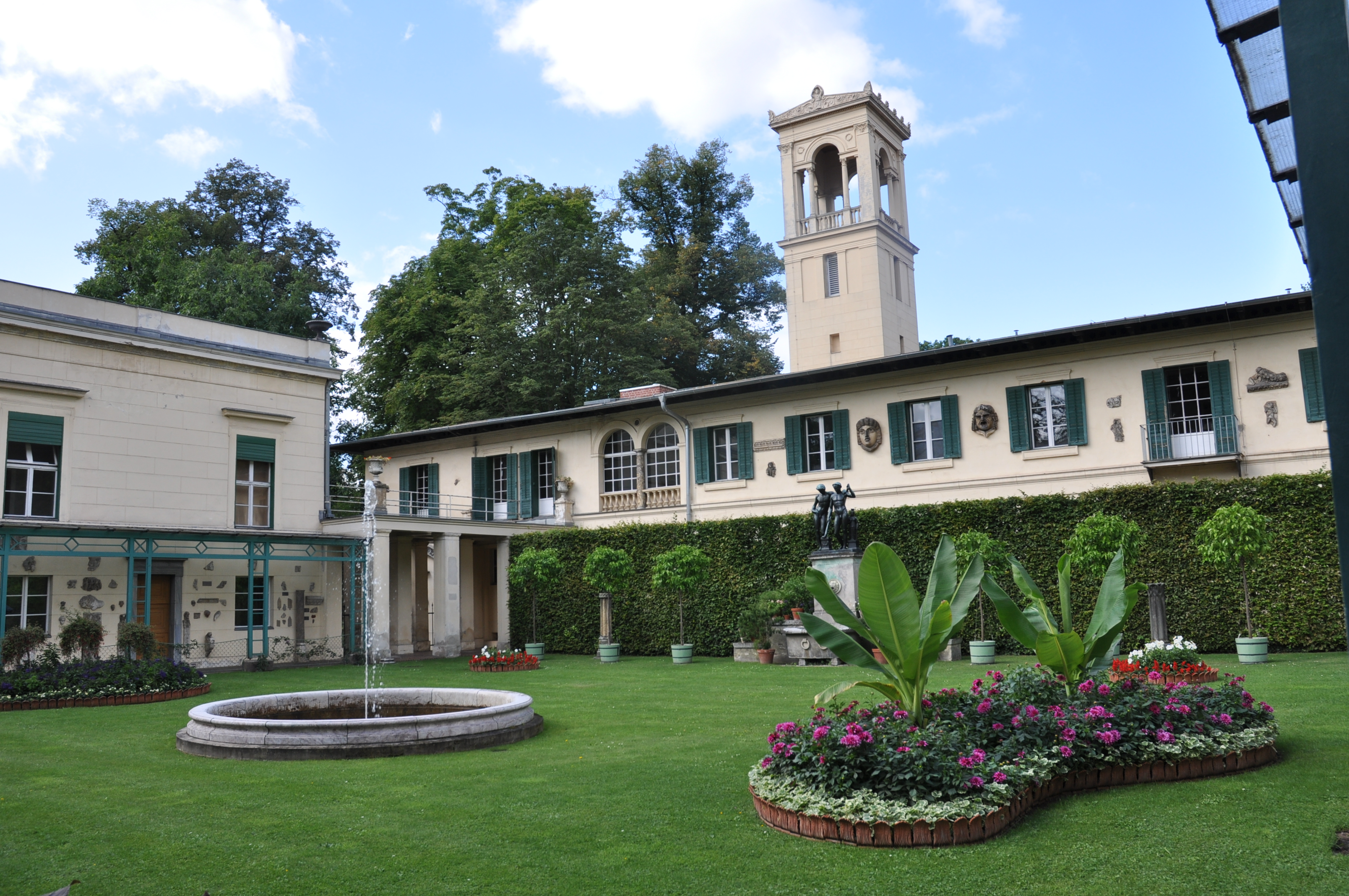
Glienicke Palace

Glienicke Palace (German: Schloss Glienicke) was designed in neoclassical style by Karl Friedrich Schinkel for Prince Carl of Prussia in 1826. It used to be the summer palace of the prince. Together with the Russian style ensemble Nikolskoe around the church Ss. Peter and Paul (German: St. Peter und Paul) on the top of a hill on the banks of the Havel river, it also belongs to the UNESCO World Heritage Site Palaces and Parks of Potsdam and Berlin.

Nikolskoe, consisting of the church, a cottage, a school and a cemetery, was established from 1813 to 1837 at the suggestion by a Russian Empress Alexandra Feodorovna, the daughter of King Frederick William III of Prussia. Her brother Prince Carl, constructor of Glienicke Palace, was buried in the church after his death. Today the church is especially popular for weddings and the cottage is housing a restaurant.

The Verein Seglerhaus am Wannsee, the second oldest yacht club in Germany, was established in October 1867 on a small wooden shack by River Havel. In 1877 it moved to its present location at the edge of the lake.

In 1909, Max Liebermann, head of the Berlin Secession, had a villa built at the western shore of the Wannsee. His widow was forced to sell it to the Deutsche Reichspost in 1940. Today, the property is a museum in honor of the painter. Especially worth seeing is the garden, which was a popular Liebermann motif.

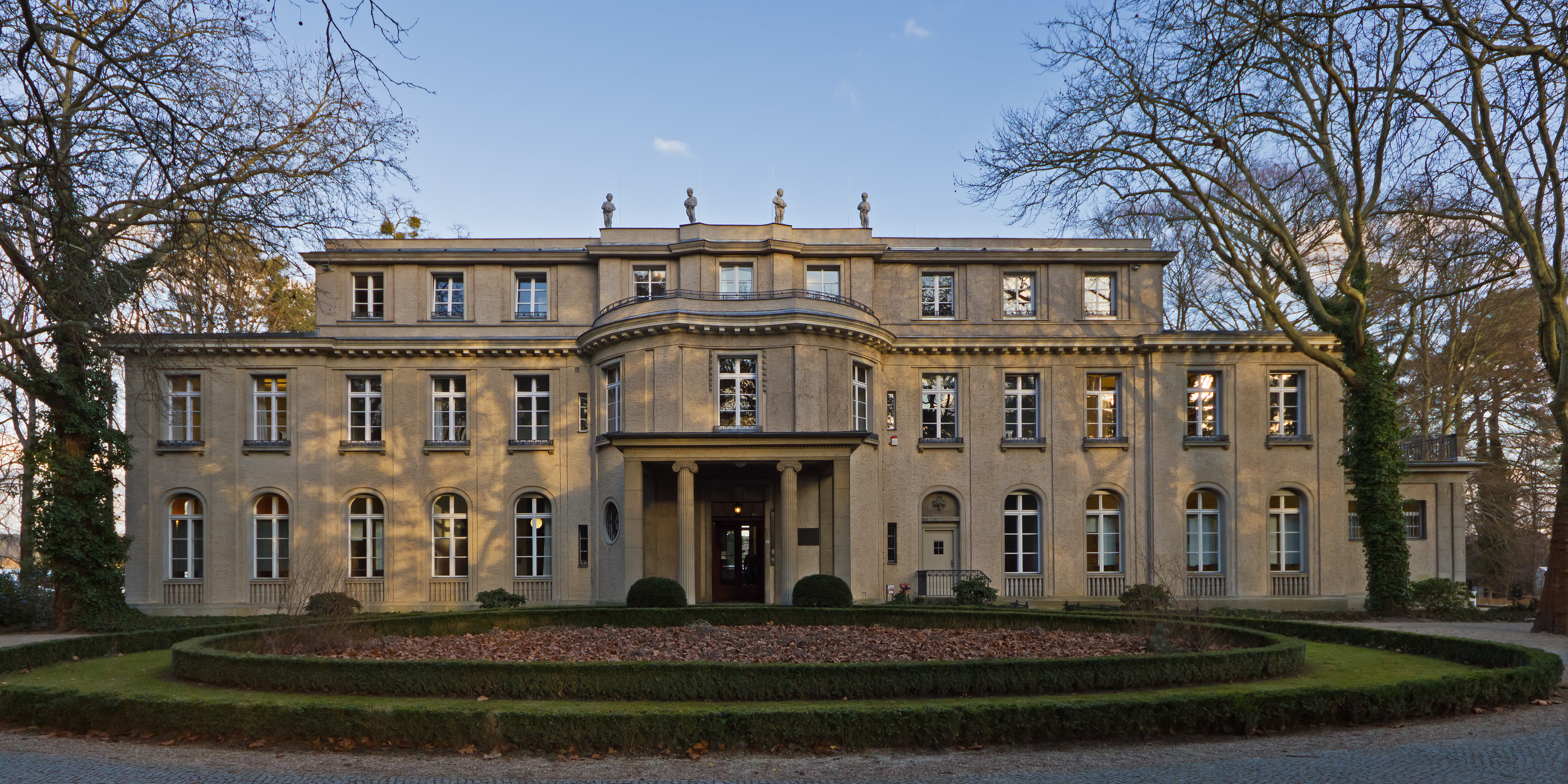
Wannsee Villa at 56–58 Am Grossen Wannsee, where the Wannsee Conference was held

In 1928, a large shooting range was established in the Düppel woods near the Berlin city limits. It was the site of the shooting events of the 1936 Summer Olympics. A golf course hosted the running section of the modern pentathlon at the same games. After World War II, it was used by the US Army as the "Rose Range" firing compound. In 1994, the shooting range was returned to Germany by the Allies, and is today used by the DEVA institute.

On 20 January 1942, senior Nazi officials met at the Wannsee Villa (built 1914–1915) to ensure the cooperation of the major government organizations in "the organizational, logistical and material steps for a final solution of the Jewish question in Europe" - the extermination of the Jews of Europe. The event, presided over by Reinhard Heydrich and conducted by Adolf Eichmann, has since become known as the Wannsee Conference. Today, the building serves as a memorial and education centre.

== Transport ==
Wannsee is served by the Berlin S-Bahn lines S1, as terminus, and S7, at the Berlin-Wannsee railway station. It is also a stop of some long-distance trains as well as of RegionalExpress and RegionalBahn trains of Deutsche Bahn and Transdev Germany. Wannsee is also linked to Kladow by Berlin ferry line F10.

== Education ==
The Japanische Internationale Schule zu Berlin, a Japanese international school, is in Wannsee.

The American Academy in Berlin is located on Lake Wannsee.

== People ==
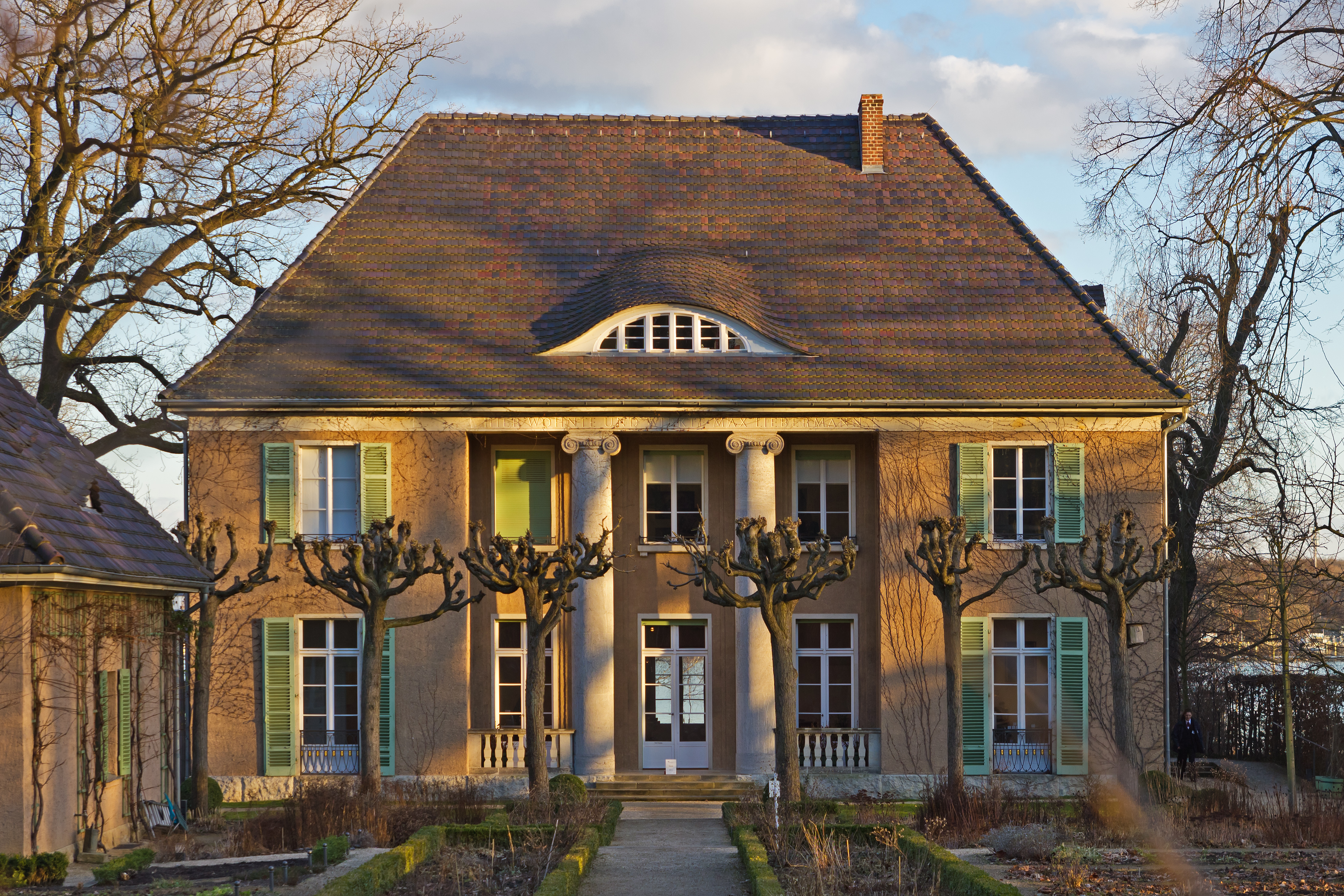
The Liebermann Villa

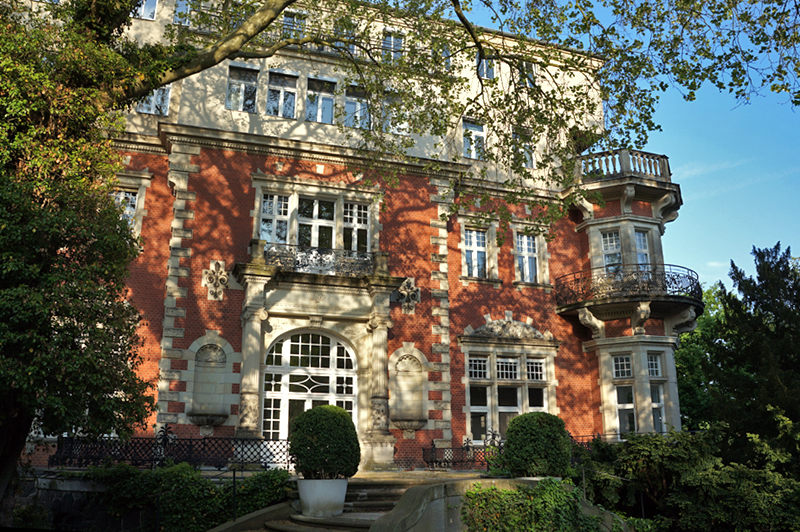
The Siemens-Villa, today: Immanuel-hospility

- Philipp Franck, painter
- Götz George, actor, childhood in Wannsee
- Otto Erich Hartleben, writer
- Max Liebermann, painter
- Berthold Schenk Graf von Stauffenberg, resistance fighter, Tristanstraße 8–10
- Claus Schenk Graf von Stauffenberg, resistance fighter
- Arthur Scherbius, inventor, lived from 1924–1929 in Wannsee
- Arnold von Siemens (1853-1918), entrepreneur
- Hermann von Siemens (1885-1986), entrepreneur
- André Butzer (* 1973), painter, lives in Wannsee

== See also ==
- Liebermann-Villa
- Isted Lion of Berlin
- Wannsee Conference
- American Academy in Berlin
