= Zehlendorf (Berlin) =

- Quarter of Berlin
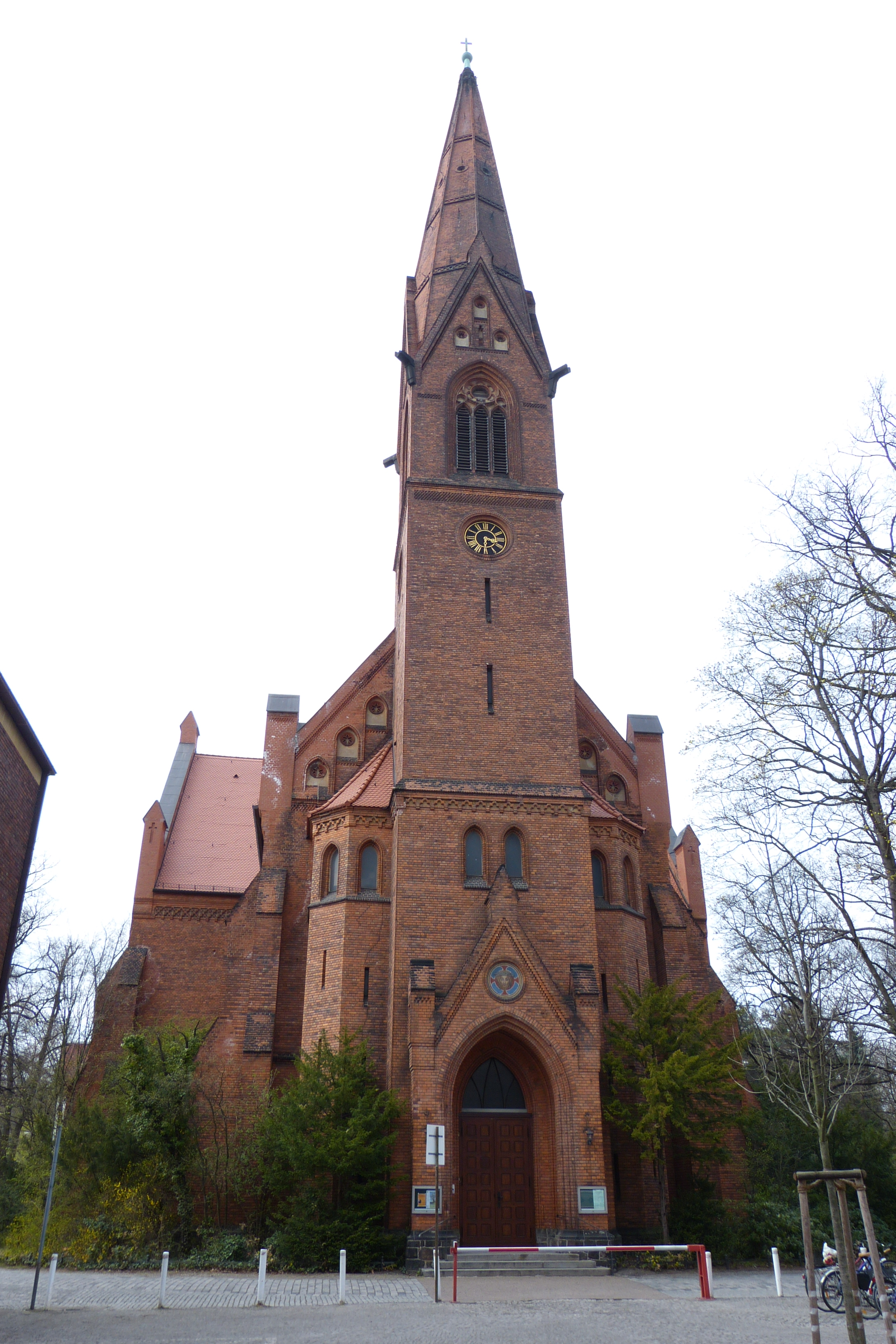
- St. Matthew's Church in Steglitz is owned and used by a congregation within the Evangelical Church of Berlin-Brandenburg-Silesian Upper Lusatia, a united church body of Calvinist, Lutheran and united congregations.

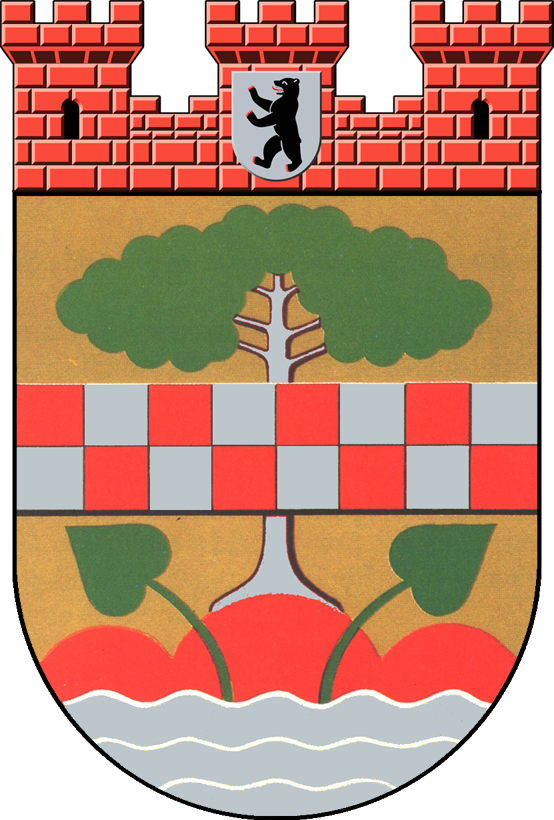
- Coat of arms

- Location of Zehlendorf in Steglitz-Zehlendorf and Berlin
- Interactive map of Zehlendorf
- Location within Germany Location within Berlin
- Coordinates: 52°26′N 13°12′E
- Country: Germany
- State: Berlin
- City: Berlin
- Borough: Steglitz-Zehlendorf
- Founded: 1200
- Subdivisions: 6 zones

Area
  - Total: 18.8 km^{2} (7.3 sq mi)
- Elevation: 50 m (160 ft)

Population (2024-12-31)
  - Total: 54,745
  - Density: 2,910/km^{2} (7,540/sq mi)
- Time zone: UTC+01:00 (CET)
  - Summer (DST): UTC+02:00 (CEST)
- Postal codes: 14163, 14165, 14167, 14169
- Vehicle registration: B

Zehlendorf (German: [ˈtseːləndɔʁf]) is a locality within the borough of Steglitz-Zehlendorf in Berlin. Before Berlin's 2001 administrative reform Zehlendorf was a borough in its own right, consisting of the locality of Zehlendorf as well as Wannsee, Nikolassee and Dahlem. Zehlendorf contains some of the most remarked upon natural settings in Berlin, including parts of the Grunewald forest and the Schlachtensee, Krumme Lanke and Waldsee lakes. Additionally, it has large affluent residential neighborhoods, some with cobblestone streets and buildings that are over 100 years old.

== History ==
The village of Zehlendorf was first mentioned as Cedelendorp in a 1245 contract between the Margraves John I and Otto III of Brandenburg and the Lehnin Abbey. Probably a German foundation, the name Cedelen appears to be a dialect word for "settlement" (modern German Siedlung), or "noble" (Cedelendorp = Cedelen + dorp, "noble village" (see Jahresbericht über die Erscheinungen auf dem Gebiete der germanischen Philologie)).

In the affluent and well-educated environment of Zehlendorf, top World War II figures mingled with opponents of the Nazi regime. Express S-Bahn trains, known as the "Banker Trains", whisked them at 120 km/h (75 mph) to the financial and government centers until the service was disrupted towards the end of World War II.

During the Nazi period, Zehlendorf's mayor was Walter Helfenstein (1890–1945), a convinced Nazi. Helfenstein was responsible for erecting a memorial to the antisemitic publisher Theodor Fritsch (1853–1933), described as "the first antisemitic memorial in Germany" in Zehlendorf in 1935. The memorial was the first memorial sculpted by the artist Arthur Wellmann (1885–1960), who was a Zehlendorf resident (and who, after producing other Nazi memorials, including one to the SA, eventually emigrated to the United States). The Fritsch memorial was melted down in 1943 to make armaments for the war. Mayor Helfenstein committed suicide on 24 April 1945 as the Red Army took Berlin. Helfenstein's death is referred to in the novel Berlin by the anti-Nazi novelist Theodor Plievier.

In 1944, Zehlendorf was the location of a subcamp of the Sachsenhausen concentration camp for Polish women.

== Geography ==
=== Subdivision ===
Zehlendorf is subdivided into 6 zones:

- Düppel
- Schlachtensee-Ost
- Schönow/Zehlendorf-Süd
- Zehlendorf-West
- Zehlendorf-Ost
- Zehlendorf-Nord (Onkel-Tom-Siedlung)

== Locale ==
Visitors can stop at the Dahlem Church, where the vicar, Pastor Martin Niemöller, served from 1931 through 1937. Niemöller's sermons against the Nazis led to his imprisonment and the publication of them in English during the war helped shape discussion of the nature of National Socialism in Christian circles.

Many walking trips are available in and around Zehlendorf. Popular destinations include the Grunewald trails north from the Onkel Toms Hütte U-Bahn station and neighborhood shopping center, the walk from Krumme Lanke U-Bahn station to the lake of the same name, and the cross-Zehlendorf walk from the end of the U-Bahn at Krumme Lanke to the S-Bahn station in the center of old Zehlendorf. Zehlendorf shopping center has undergone major changes with plenty of new construction centering on the S-Bahn station "Zehlendorf."

When American forces occupied Berlin and later were stationed in Berlin during the Cold War, Zehlendorf with the "Steuben Barracks", Dahlem and Lichterfelde were the areas where most of those forces were centered, including elements of the Berlin Brigade stationed at the McNair Barracks.

== Transportation ==
There is direct access to central Berlin via road and S-Bahn. The S1 line makes 3 stops in Zehlendorf and runs right through Unter den Linden, where the Brandenburg Gate is located. The newer portion of the borough of Zehlendorf developed around extended U-Bahn service in the first third of the 20th century. It may be reached via the U3 line at the station Onkel Toms Hütte and the terminus Krumme Lanke.

The Bundesstraße 1 federal highway runs through the locality along the streets Berliner Straße, Potsdamer Straße and Potsdamer Chaussee. Zehlendorf has also access to the A 115 Autobahn (the former AVUS racing track) at the Hüttenweg junction.

== Points of interest ==
- AlliiertenMuseum
- Krumme Lanke
- Schlachtensee

== Gallery ==
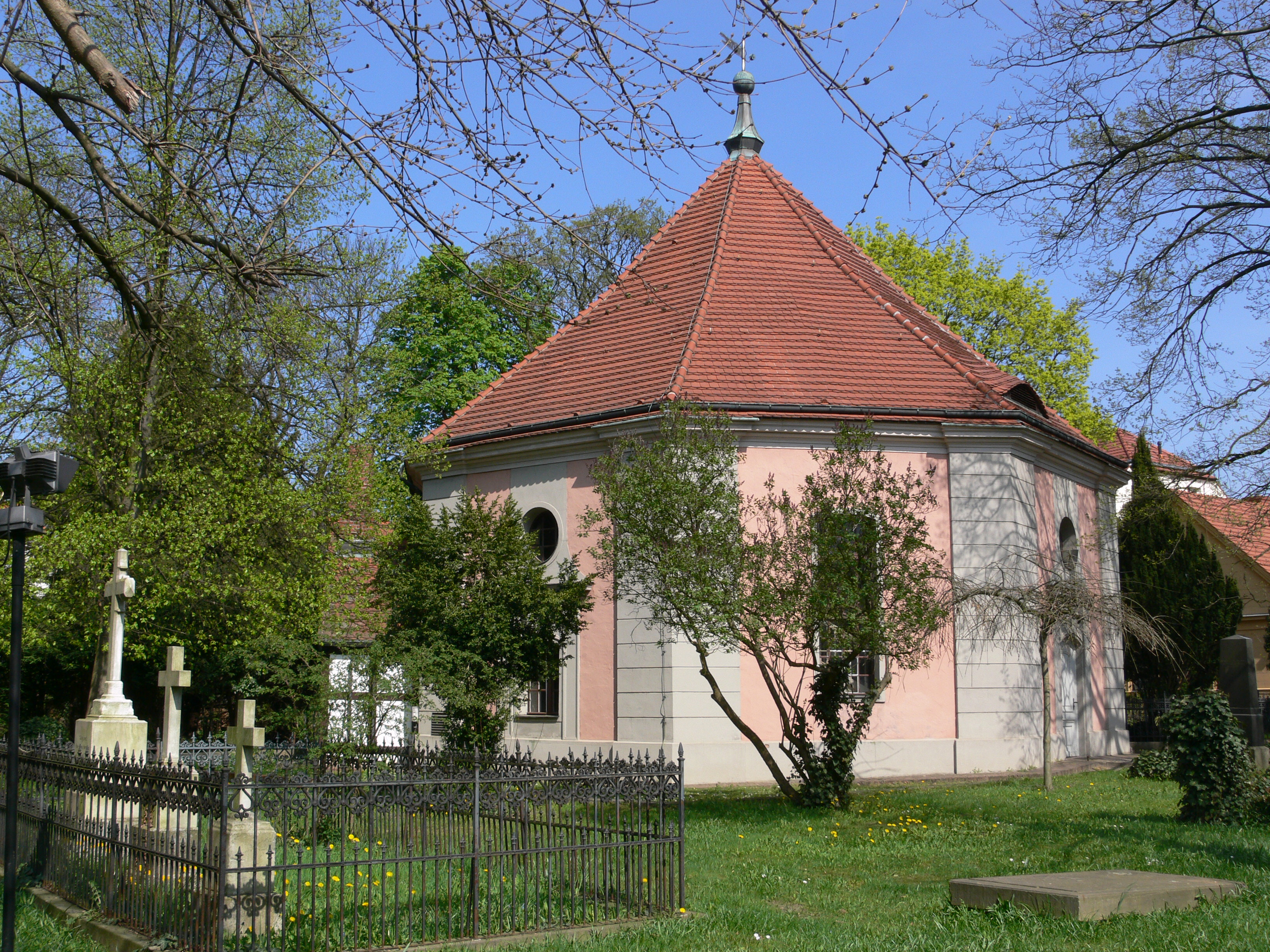
Village church

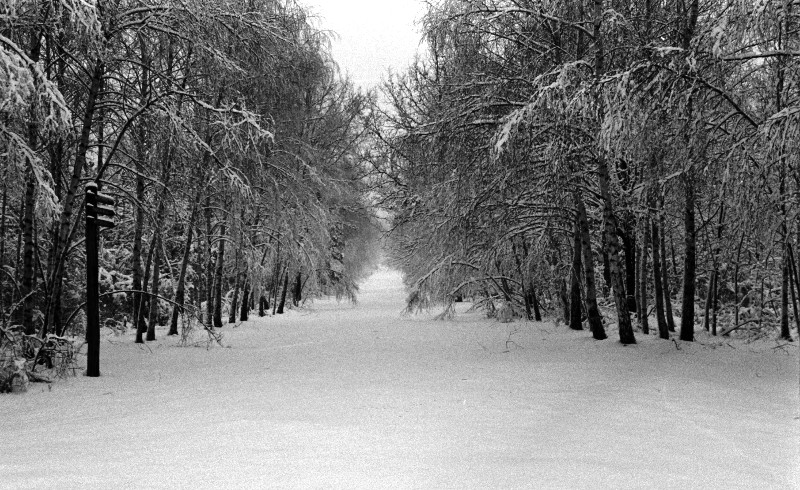
Peaceful snowscape as seen during a U.S. Army patrol in Zehlendorf's forest

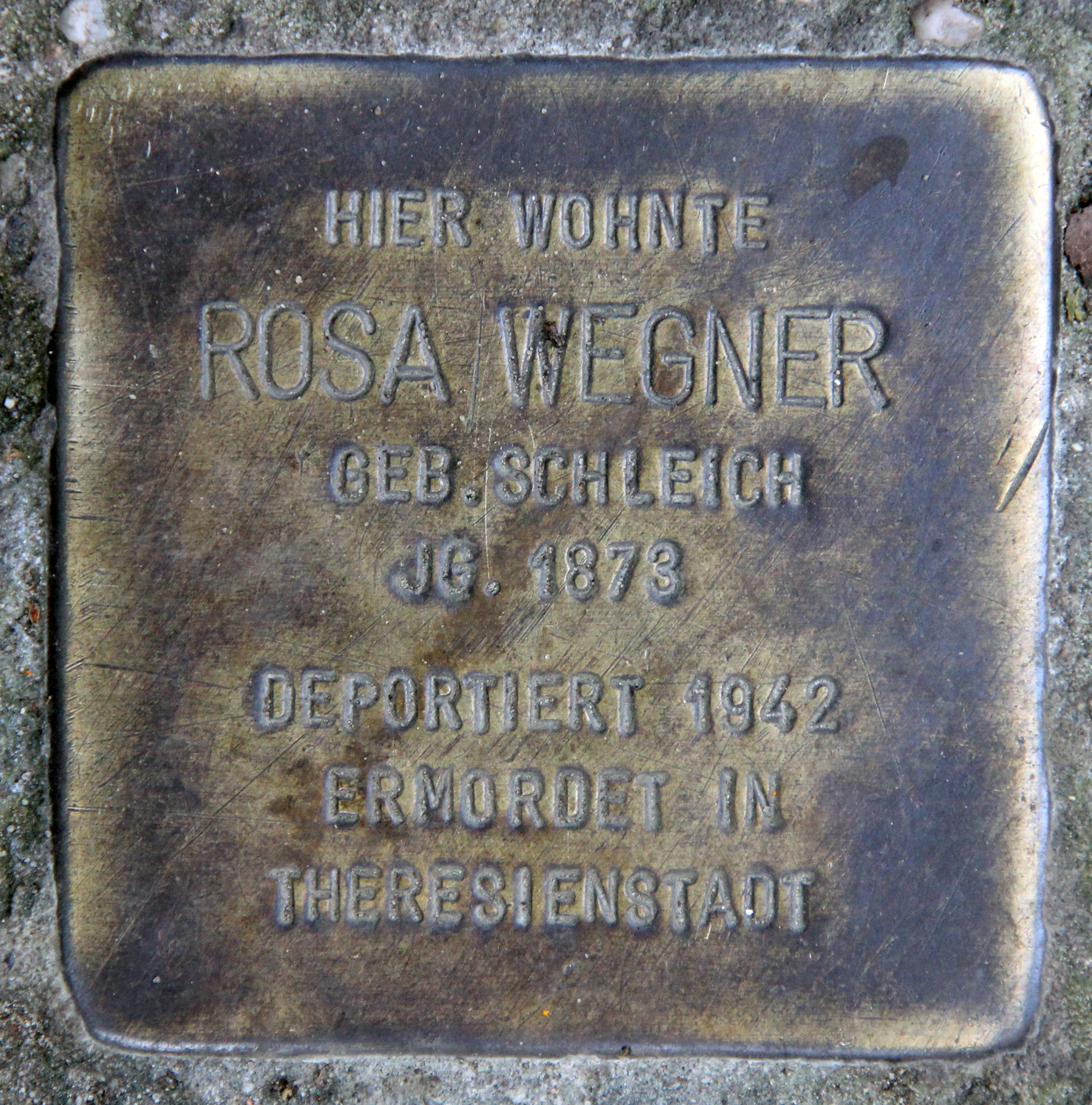
Stolperstein in Zehlendorf

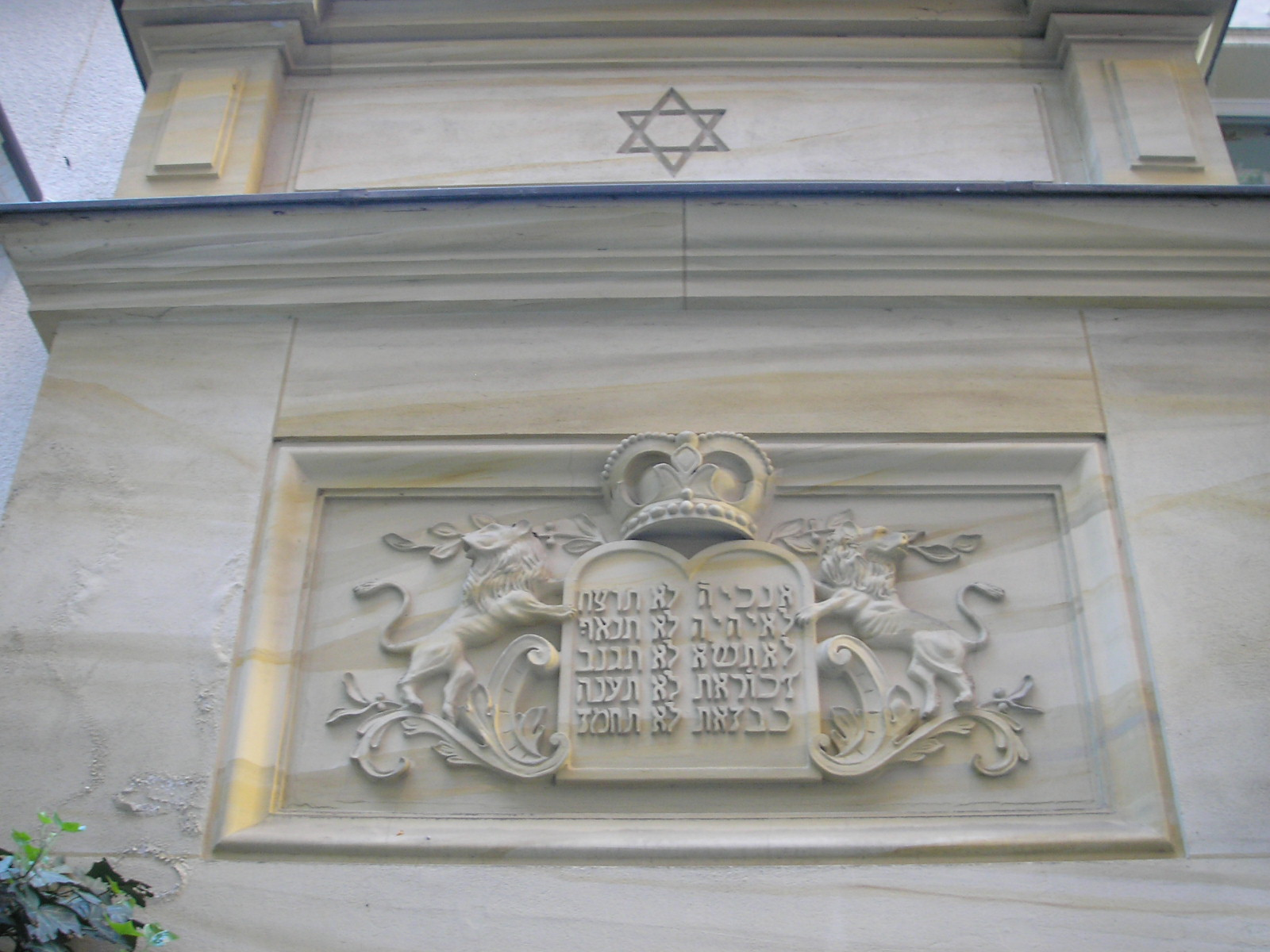
View of the former synagogue in Steglitz, Berlin

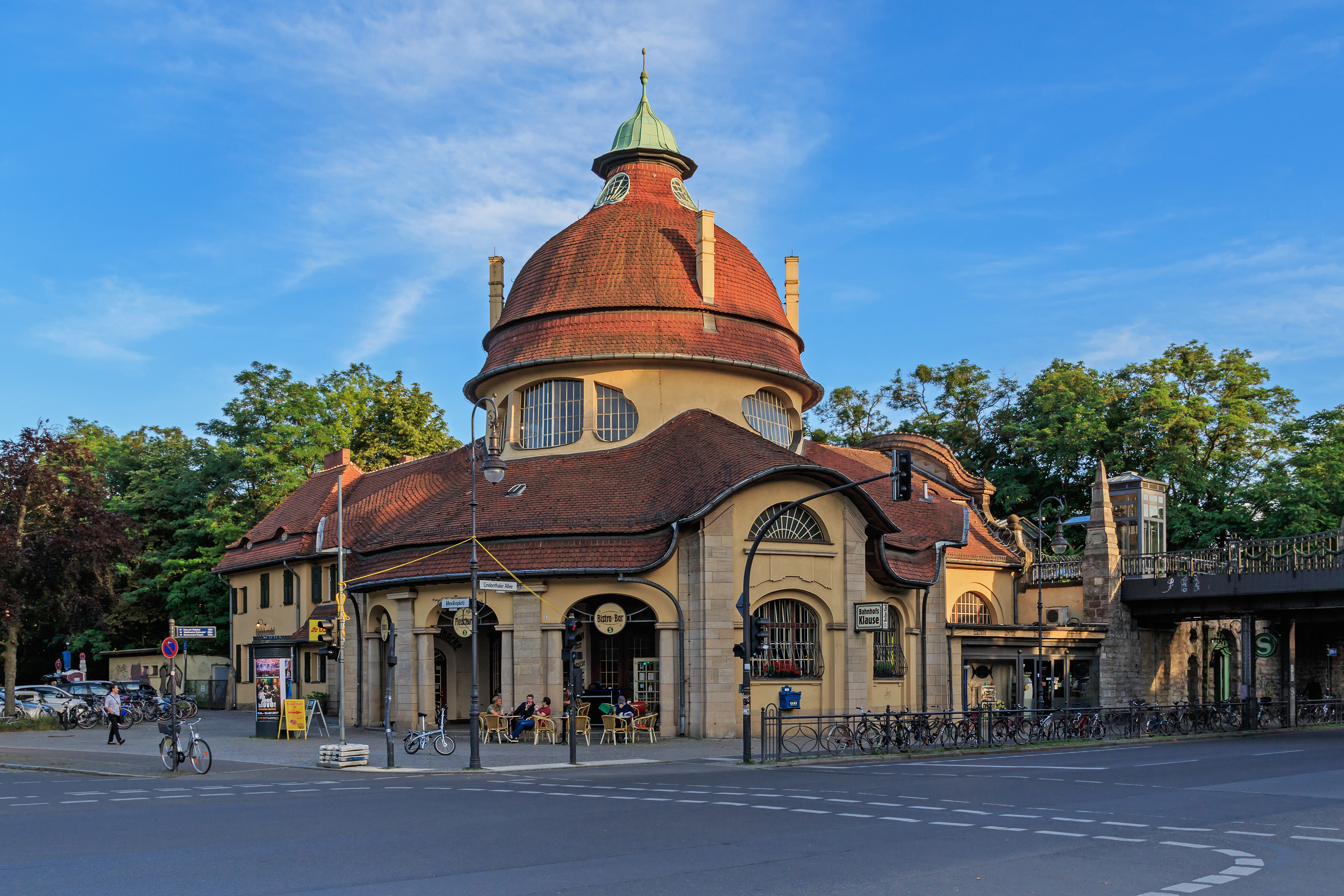
Berlin Mexikoplatz Station

== People ==
=== Sons and daughters ===
- Sigismund von Braun (1911–1998), German diplomat
- Klaus Fischer-Dieskau (1921–1994), German church musician
- Dietrich Fischer-Dieskau (1925–2012), German baritone

=== People, who live(d) there ===
- Bürger Lars Dietrich, German singer
- Harald Juhnke, German actor
- Ursula Karven, German actress
- Sarah Connor, German singer
- Tina Ruland, German actress
- Jörg Thadeusz, German journalist
- Jürgen Tarrach, German actor
- Matthias Brandt, German actor
- Andrea Sawatzki, German actress
- Herbert Grönemeyer, German singer
- Fahri Yardim, German actor
- August Diehl, German actor
- Alisa Fuss, German-Israeli human rights activist
- Daniel Brühl, German actor
- Anna Maria Mühe, German actress
- Heike Makatsch (part of her life), German actress
- Nina Hoss, German actress
- Katharina Wackernagel, German actress
- Yvonne Catterfeld, German singer
- Hannah Herzsprung, German actress
- Corinna Harfouch, German actress
- Julie Delpy, French-American actress and film director
- Tom Tykwer, German film director
- Wladimir Kaminer, German writer
- Leander Haussmann, German film director and actor
- Jasmin Tabatabai, German actress

== See also ==
- Grunewald (forest)
- Krumme Lanke
- Hertha Zehlendorf
