= Nikolassee =

- Quarter of Berlin
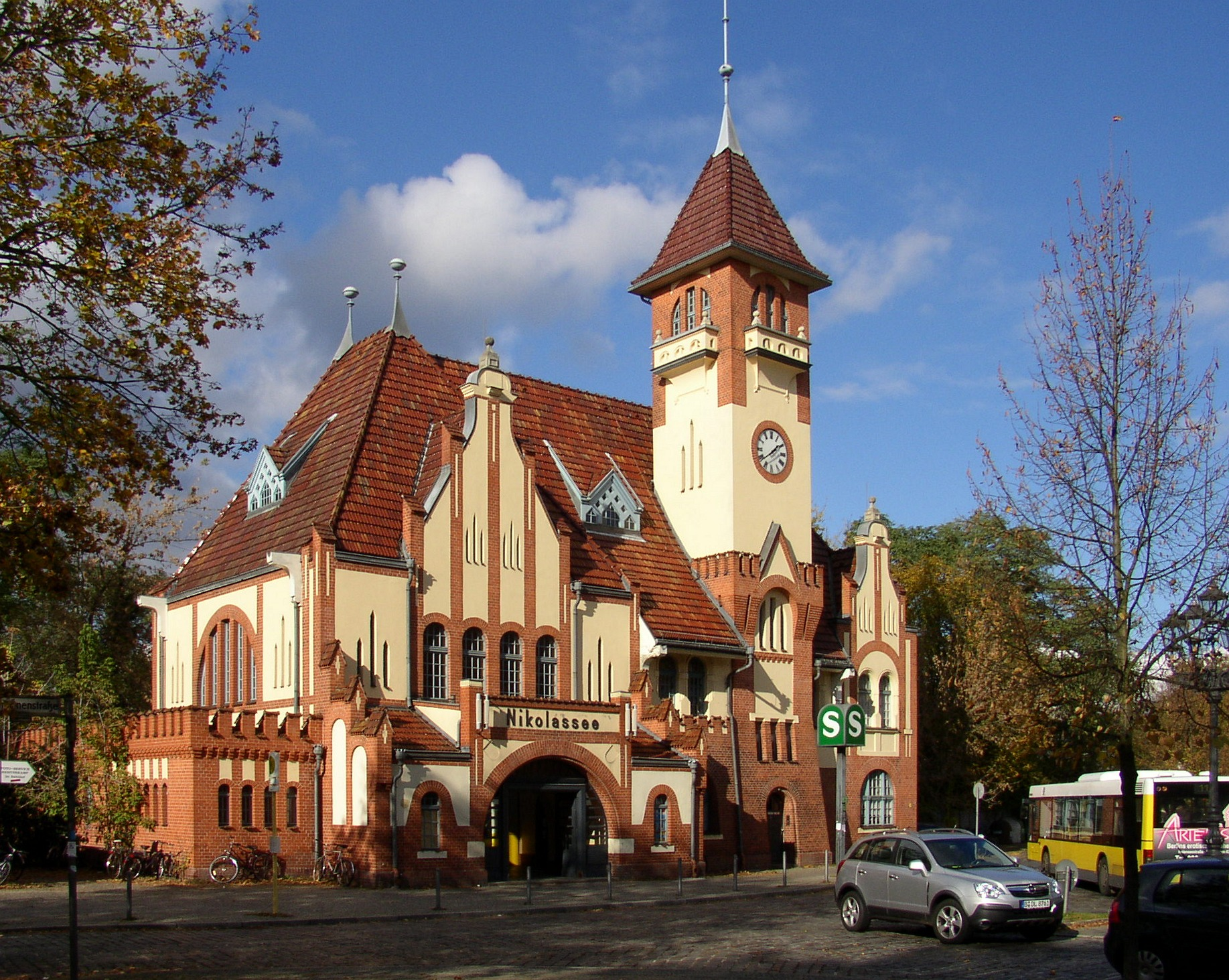
- Nikolassee station building

- Location of Nikolassee in Steglitz-Zehlendorf and Berlin
- Interactive map of Nikolassee
- Location within Germany Location within Berlin
- Coordinates: 52°26′00″N 13°12′00″E
- Country: Germany
- State: Berlin
- City: Berlin
- Borough: Steglitz-Zehlendorf
- Founded: 1901

Area
  - Total: 19.6 km^{2} (7.6 sq mi)
- Elevation: 105 m (344 ft)

Population (2024-12-31)
  - Total: 11,641
  - Density: 594/km^{2} (1,540/sq mi)
- Time zone: UTC+01:00 (CET)
  - Summer (DST): UTC+02:00 (CEST)
- Postal codes: 14129, 14163, 14193
- Vehicle registration: B

Nikolassee (German pronunciation: [ˈnɪkolasˌzeː]) is a locality (Ortsteil) of Berlin in the borough (Bezirk) of Steglitz-Zehlendorf, named after the small Nikolassee lake. Located in the affluent Southwest of the city, the area comprises parts of the Schlachtensee neighbourhood and the eastern shore of the Großer Wannsee lake with the large Strandbad Wannsee lido, as well as the islets of Schwanenwerder and Lindwerder.

== Geography ==
Nikolassee is located on the Bundesstraße 1 road from the Berlin city centre to Potsdam, south of the extended Grunewald forest. The river Havel separates it from Kladow and Gatow in the Spandau borough. Other localities bordering with Nikolassee are Wannsee, Zehlendorf and Grunewald (this one in Charlottenburg-Wilmersdorf district). Its southern neighbour Kleinmachnow is a municipality in the Potsdam-Mittelmark district of Brandenburg. The residential areas of Nikolassee and Grunewald are separated by the Grunewald forest.

== History ==
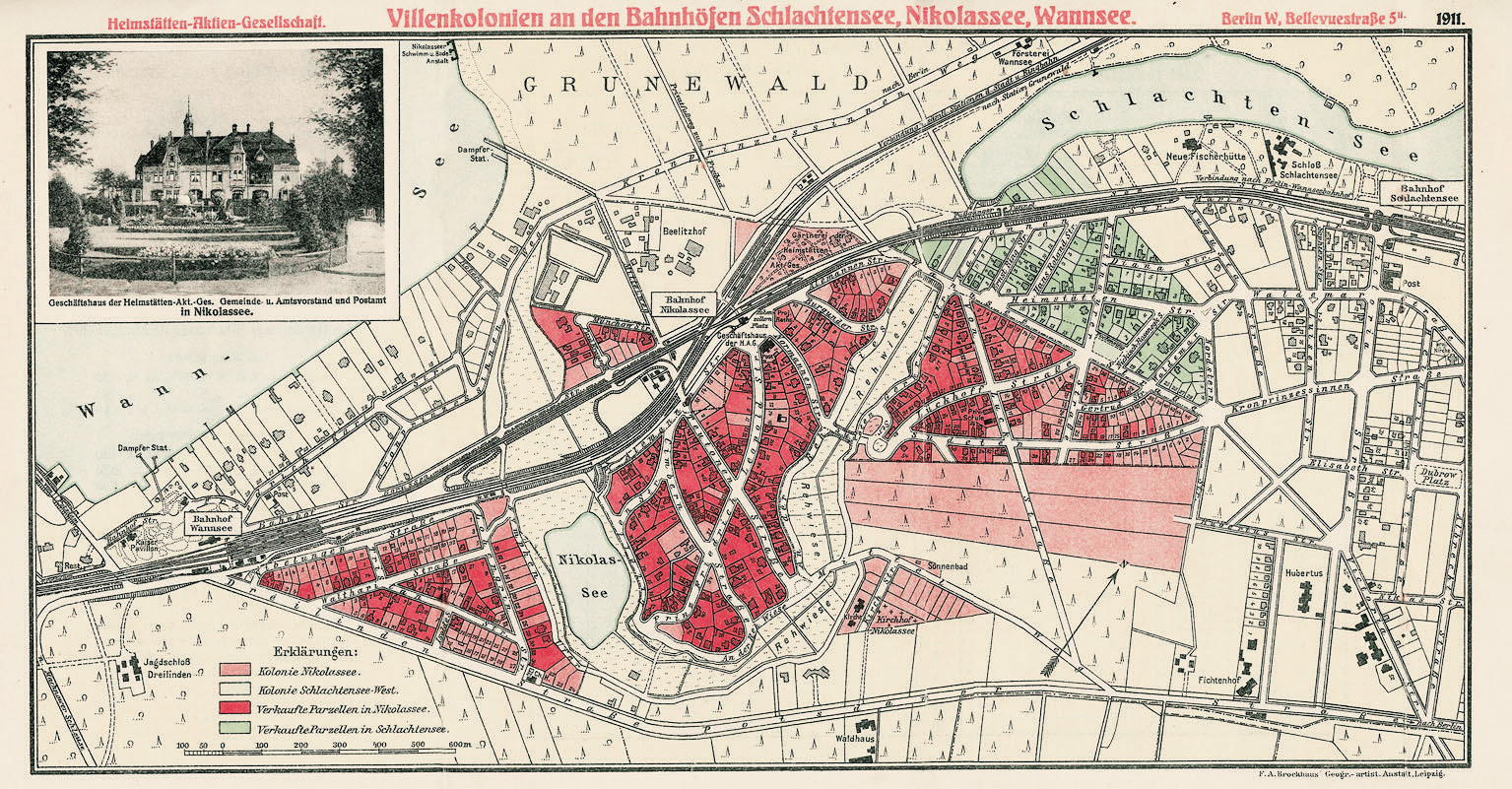
Villenkolonie Nikolassee, 1911 map

Once part of the Düppel manor, from 1901 onwards the area was developed as a mansion colony (Villenkolonie Nikolassee). One year later, the settlement received connection to the Berlin-Blankenheim and Wannsee Railway lines with the opening of Berlin-Nikolassee station.

Originally an independent Brandenburg municipality, Nikolassee was incorporated into Berlin with the Greater Berlin Act of 1920. Part of West Berlin during the "Cold War", its southern border with the municipality of Kleinmachnow, at the same time the border between the American Sector and what was to be East Germany, was fortified by the Berlin Wall between 1961 and 1989. Located on the present A 115 motorway was the US Checkpoint Bravo (Drewitz-Dreilinden), built in 1969.

== Transport ==
Nikolassee is served by the S-Bahn lines S1, S5 and S7, at the homonymous station. The locality is also crossed by the motorway A 115 (the former AVUS, exit "Spanischer Allee"), and by the federal highway B1.

== Photogallery ==
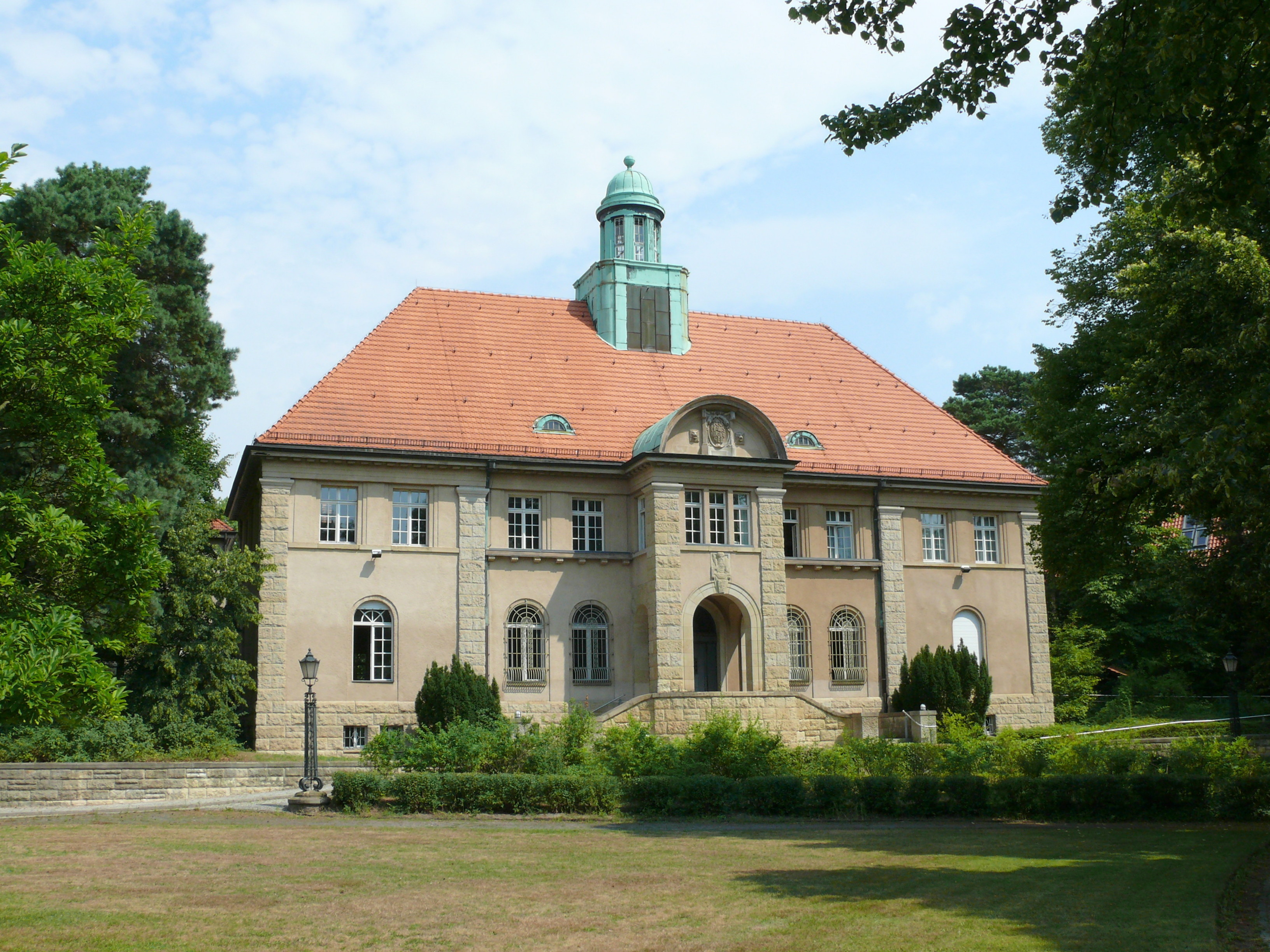
Town Hall Nikolassee

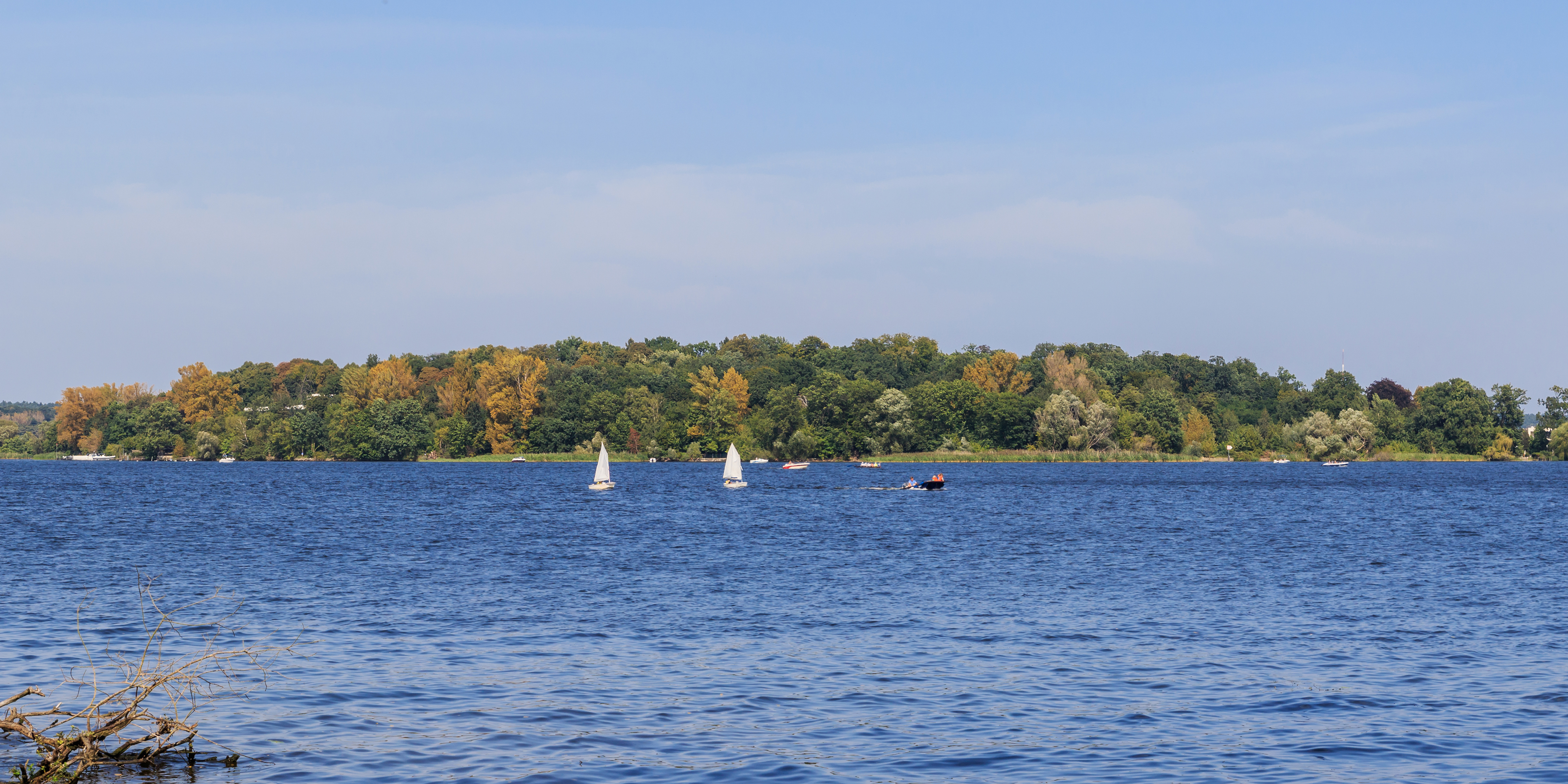
View of Schwanenwerder island

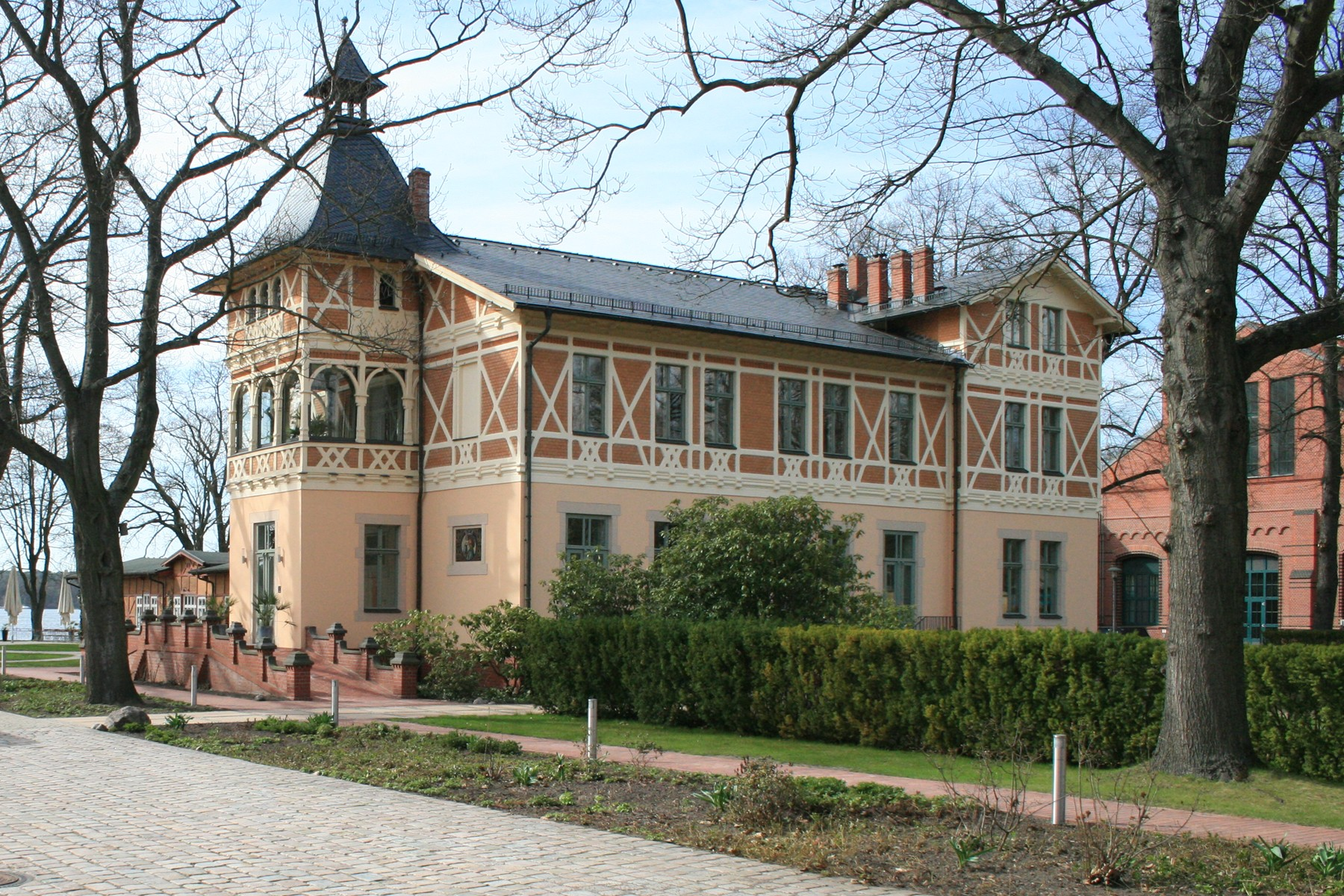
Restaurant and lake port Schloss Wannsee

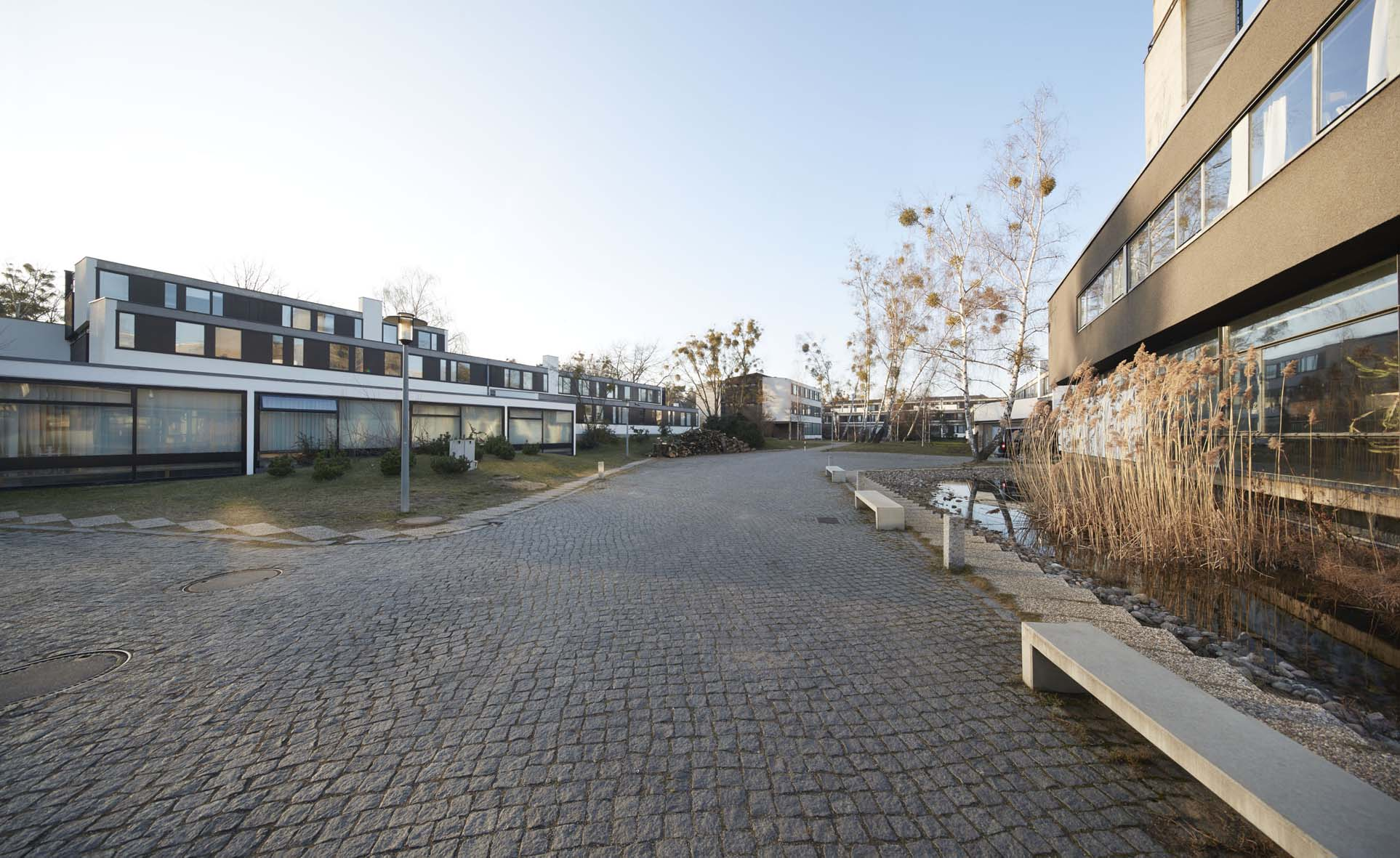
Student Village Schlachtensee (Central Square)

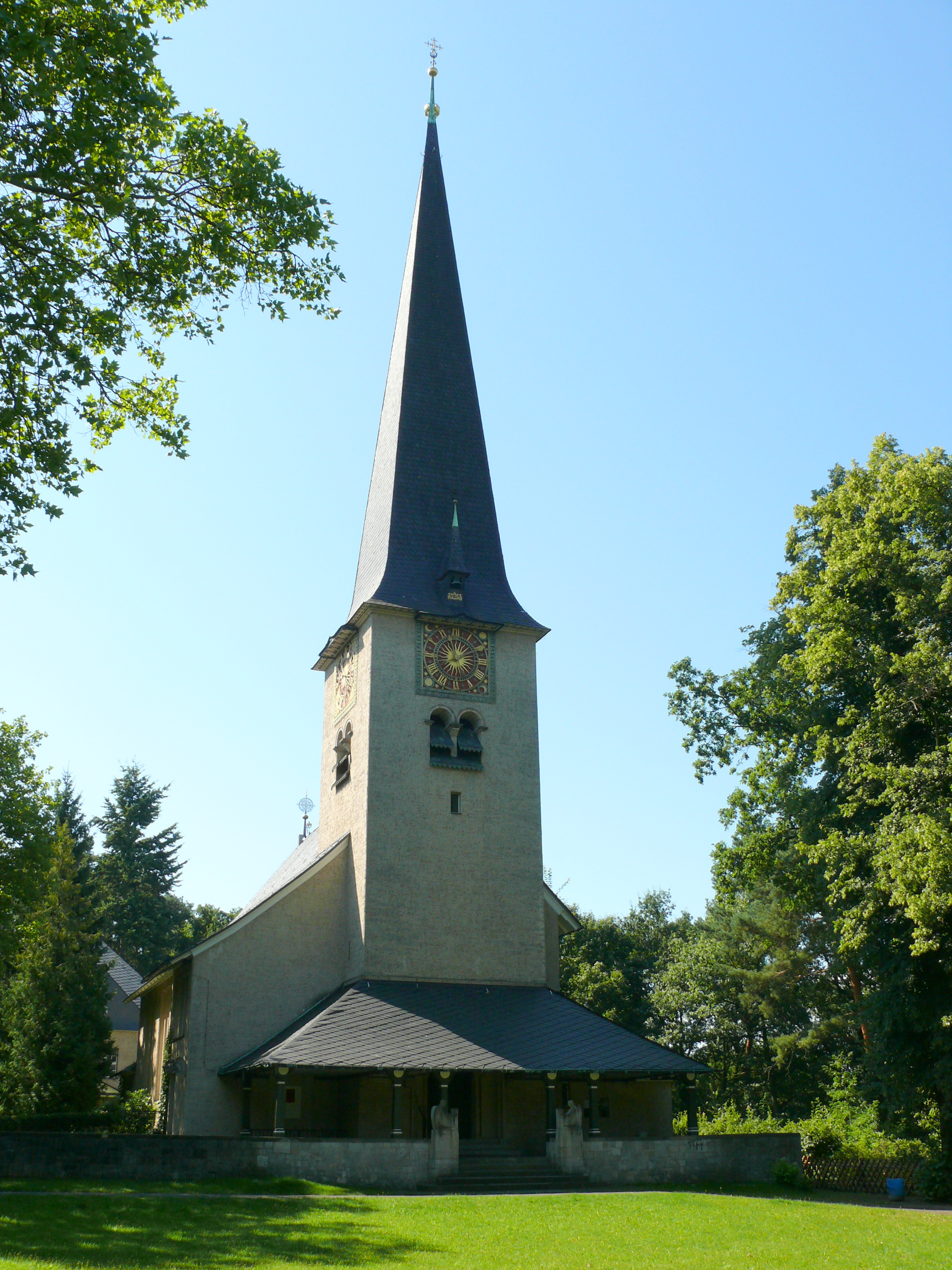
Nikolassee Church
