= Stolpe (Berlin) =

Coordinates: 52°24′45″N 13°08′29″E

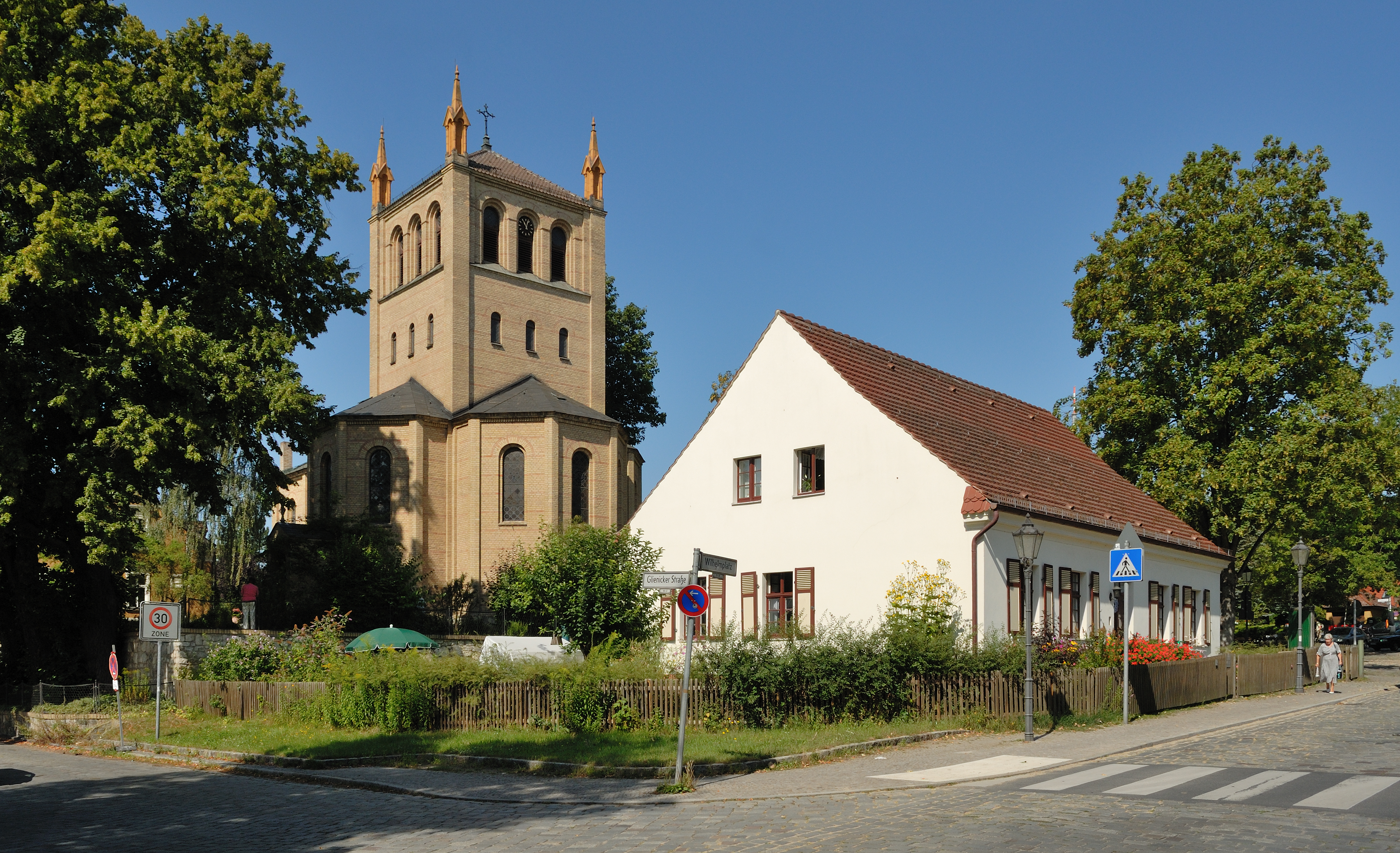
Village church

Stolpe (German pronunciation: [ˈʃtɔlpə]) is a historic village in the western suburbs of Berlin, the capital city of Germany. It is situated in the locality of Wannsee, in the borough of Steglitz-Zehlendorf. Stolpe has a documented history going back to 1299.

During Germany's occupation between 1945–1949, Stolpe was transferred from the Soviet Zone to the French zone so that the latter could construct an airport. When Tegel Airport, closer to the city centre, was built instead during the Berlin Airlift, the Soviets reoccupied Stolpe on 21 December 1945, and the village found itself behind the Iron Curtain.

At the western side of Stolpe is located the Helmholtz-Zentrum Berlin.

== Personalities ==
- Otto Erich Hartleben (1864–1905)
- Gustav Hartmann (1859–1938)
- Ludwig Pallat (1867–1947)
- Peter Pallat (1901-1992)
- Adolf Reichwein (1898–1944)
- Rosemarie Reichwein (1904–2002)
- Heinz Schröder (1910–1997)
