= Japanische Internationale Schule zu Berlin =

- ベルリン日本人国際学校

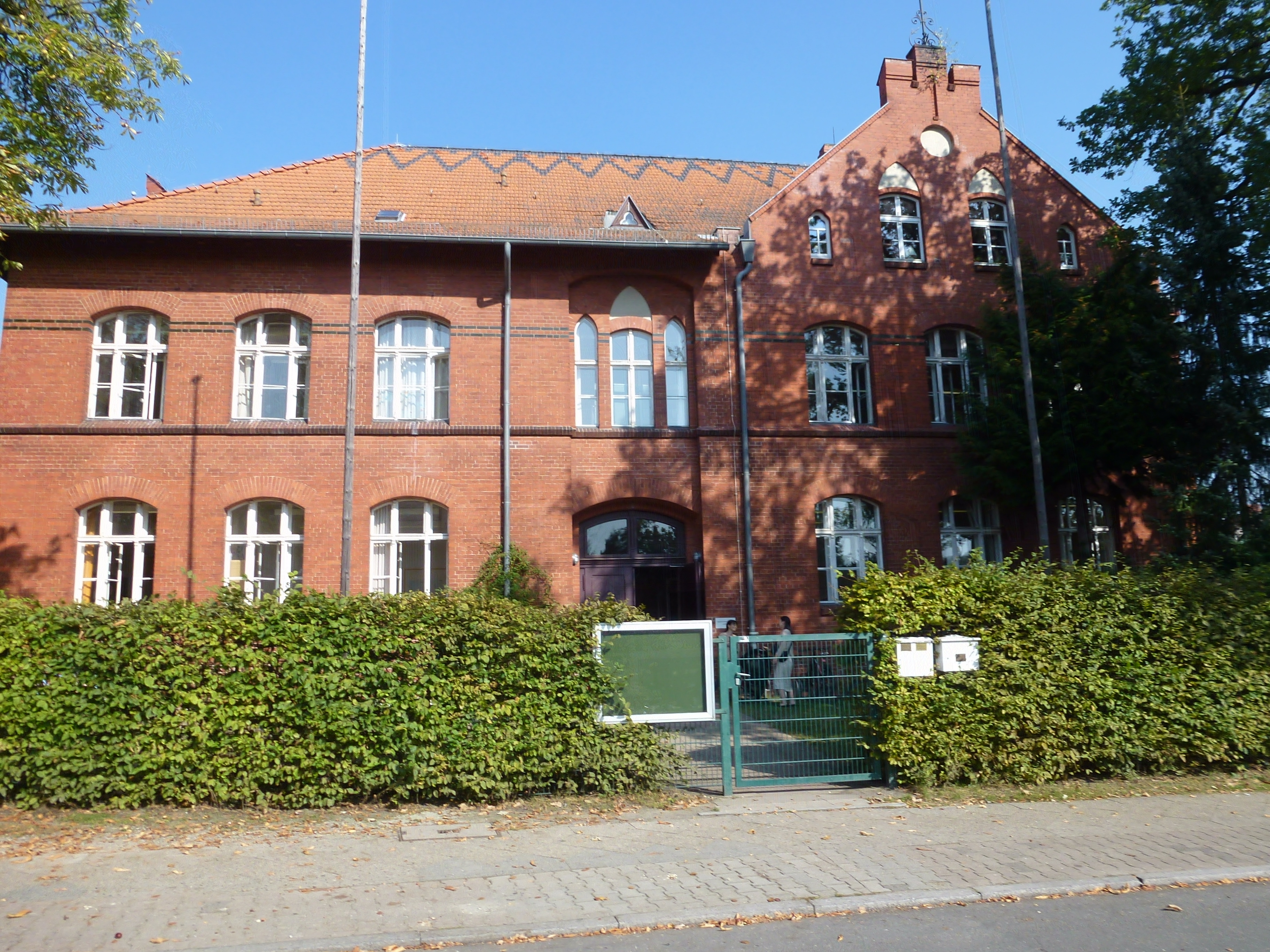
- Former location in Charlottenburgstrasse in 2014
- Berlin; Germany

Information
- Type: Primary & middle school
- Established: 1993; 33 years ago
- Grades: 1-9
- Website: jap-schule-berlin.de

The Japanische Internationale Schule zu Berlin e.V. (ベルリン日本人国際学校, Berurin Nihonjin Kokusai Gakkō) is a Japanese international school (nihonjin gakkō) located in the Lankwitz area of Steglitz-Zehlendorf, Berlin, Germany.

The fourth nihonjin gakkō in Germany, the school opened in 1993.

== See also ==
- Japanese people in Germany
- German international schools in Japan:
  - German School Tokyo Yokohama - in Yokohama, Japan
  - Deutsche Schule Kobe/European School
