= Steglitz-Zehlendorf =

- Borough of Berlin
- Flag Coat of arms

- Location of Steglitz-Zehlendorf in Berlin
- Interactive map of Steglitz-Zehlendorf
- Location within Germany Location within Berlin
- Coordinates: 52°26′N 13°15′E
- Country: Germany
- State: Berlin
- City: Berlin
- Subdivisions: 8 localities

Government
  - Mayor: Maren Schellenberg (Greens)

Area
  - Total: 102.5 km^{2} (39.6 sq mi)

Population (2024-12-31)
  - Total: 295,786
  - Density: 2,886/km^{2} (7,474/sq mi)
- Time zone: UTC+01:00 (CET)
  - Summer (DST): UTC+02:00 (CEST)
- Postal codes: 12157, 12161, 12163, 12165, 12167, 12169, 12203, 12205, 12207, 12209, 12247, 12249, 14109, 14129, 14163, 14165, 14167, 14169, 14193, 14195
- Vehicle registration: B
- Website: Official homepage

Steglitz-Zehlendorf (German: [ˌʃteːɡlɪts ˈtseːləndɔʁf]) is the sixth borough of Berlin, formed in Berlin's 2001 administrative reform by merging the former boroughs of Steglitz and Zehlendorf.

Home to the Free University of Berlin, the Berlin Botanical Garden, and a variety of museums and art collections, Steglitz-Zehlendorf is an important hub for research, science and culture in Berlin. It is known to be the wealthiest borough of Berlin, having the city's highest median household income.

== History ==
The first mention of a present-day locality in the district by name was Lankwitz (Lancewitz) in 1239. It is assumed that Slavic and German settlements were established at the Schlachtensee and Krumme Lanke lakes after 1200 at the latest. The first documented mention of Zehlendorf (then Cedelendorp) dates back to 1242. Here the Lehnin Abbey bought the settlement and kept it until 1542. Frederick the Great donated a church to the village in 1768 during a stopover on the journey from the Berlin Palace to the Sanssouci Palace. The settlement was located halfway between the two places, which gave the village an economic boost through its function as a relay station. Steglitz also originated in the first half of the 13th century as a Linear settlement. At the end of this century the wooden church was replaced with the village church Steglitz. It stood until the 19th century, when it was replaced by Matthew's Church.

Today's double district is still characterized by connecting infrastructure between Berlin and Potsdam. For example, the first section of the Reichsstraße 1 was routed through Steglitz and Zehlendorf (paved in 1792). In 1838, the Stammbahn was opened parallel to this. This development of the suburbs led to a strong growth of the settlements. Steglitz became the largest rural municipality in Prussia around 1900 with 80,000 inhabitants. The former districts of Steglitz and Zehlendorf were formed in 1920 during the formation of Greater Berlin from previously independent rural communities and estate districts of the Teltow district. The entire area of the present district belonged to the American Sector of Berlin after the Second World War from 1945 to 1990, together with the districts of Tempelhof, Schöneberg, Neukölln and Kreuzberg. In 2001, the two formerly independent districts were merged to form the district of Steglitz-Zehlendorf as part of Berlin's administrative reform. In December 2020, the new Locality Schlachtensee was founded on the initiative of local residents.

== Demographics ==
As of 2021, Steglitz-Zehlendorf had a population of roughly 306 000, making it the fifth most populous out of Berlin's twelve boroughs. The median age was 46,5, the highest of all Berlin boroughs. 28,8% of Steglitz-Zehlendorf residents had a migration background, lying under the Berlin average of 36%.

Steglitz-Zehlendorf has the highest number of Abitur (secondary education degree) graduates in Berlin. The borough also has the highest median household income and the lowest unemployment rate in Berlin. With 15% of Steglitz-Zehlendorf households making more than 200% of the German national median income, it is the wealthiest Berlin borough.

| Percentage of the population with migration background | |
|---|---|
| Germans without migration background/Ethnic Germans | 76% (223.400) |
| Germans with migration background/Foreigners | 24% (70.600) |
| – Middle Eastern/Muslim migration background (Turkey, Arab League, Iran etc.) | 4.5% (13.200) |
| – Polish migration background | 3.0% (9.800) |
| – Yugoslavian migration background | 1.5% (4.000) |
| – Afro-German/African background | 1.1% (3.000) |
| – Others (Greeks, Italians, East Asians etc.) | 14.0% (40.600) |

== Subdivision ==
Subdivisions of Steglitz-Zehlendorf

Since December 2020, the Steglitz-Zehlendorf borough consists of eight localities:

Localities
and Neighborhoods
0601 Steglitz
0602 Lichterfelde
- Lichterfelde West
0603 Lankwitz
0604 Zehlendorf
- Düppel
0605 Dahlem
0606 Nikolassee
- Schwanenwerder
0607 Wannsee
- Steinstücken
- Stolpe
0608 Schlachtensee

== Politics ==
=== District council ===
The governing body of Steglitz-Zehlendorf is the district council (Bezirksverordnetenversammlung). It has responsibility for passing laws and electing the city government, including the mayor. The most recent district council election was held on 26 September 2021, and the results were as follows:

| Party | Lead candidate | Votes | % | +/- | Seats | +/- |
|---|---|---|---|---|---|---|
| Christian Democratic Union (CDU) | Cerstin Richter-Kotowski | 48,961 | 27.2 | ▼1.2 | 17 | ±0 |
| Alliance 90/The Greens (Grüne) | Maren Schellenberg | 40,184 | 22.4 | ▲2.7 | 14 | ▲3 |
| Social Democratic Party (SPD) | Carolina Böhm | 39,079 | 21.7 | ▼0.8 | 13 | ±0 |
| Free Democratic Party (FDP) | Mathia Specht-Habbel | 16,997 | 9.5 | ▼0.4 | 5 | ±0 |
| Alternative for Germany (AfD) | Peer Döhnert | 9,245 | 5.1 | ▼5.4 | 3 | ▼3 |
| The Left (LINKE) | Pia Imhof-Speckmann | 9,007 | 5.0 | ▼1.0 | 3 | ±0 |
| Tierschutzpartei | | 4,503 | 2.5 | New | 0 | New |
| dieBasis | | 2,750 | 1.5 | New | 0 | New |
| Volt Germany | | 2,595 | 1.4 | New | 0 | New |
| Die PARTEI | | 2,332 | 1.3 | New | 0 | New |
| Free Voters | | 1,797 | 1.0 | New | 0 | New |
| Klimaliste | | 911 | 0.5 | New | 0 | New |
| Pirate Party Germany | | 832 | 0.5 | ▼1.9 | 0 | ±0 |
| The Humanists | | 503 | 0.3 | New | 0 | New |
| Valid votes | | 179,696 | 99.2 | | | |
| Invalid votes | | 1,431 | 0.8 | | | |
| Total | | 181,127 | 100.0 | | 55 | ±0 |
| Electorate/voter turnout | | 234,324 | 77.3 | ▲6.1 | | |
Source: Elections Berlin

=== District government ===
The district mayor (Bezirksbürgermeister) is elected by the Bezirksverordnetenversammlung, and positions in the district government (Bezirksamt) are apportioned based on party strength. Maren Schellenberg of the Greens was elected mayor on 8 December 2021. Since the 2021 municipal elections, the composition of the district government is as follows:

| Councillor | Party | Portfolio |
|---|---|---|
| Maren Schellenberg | GRÜNE | District Mayor; Finance, Staff, Economic Development and Logistics |
| Cerstin Richter-Kotowski | CDU | Deputy Mayor; Education, Culture and Sport |
| Urban Aykal | GRÜNE | Public Order, Environment, Roads and Green Spaces |
| Michael Karnetzki | SPD | Urban Development |
| Tim Richter | CDU | Civil Service and Social Affairs |
| Carolina Böhm | SPD | Youth and Health |
Source: Berlin.de

== Landmarks ==
- The Bierpinsel (literally: "Beer Brush"), a 1970s style tower in Steglitz
- The Botanical Garden in Lichterfelde West
- The Lichterfelde West Villenkolonie – exclusive residential area from 1860 with tree lined and cobbled streets
- Glienicke Palace
- Glienicke Hunting Lodge
- The Philological Library at the Free University of Berlin in Dahlem, by Norman Foster
- Prussian Privy State Archives in Dahlem
- The Wannsee: lake, villa (site of the notorious Wannsee Conference), and lido
- Liebermann Villa, former residence of the painter Max Liebermann, today a museum for his art at the Wannsee
- Pfaueninsel (Peacock Island), with the same named castle in the Wannsee
- Berlin Mexikoplatz station, Art Nouveau railway station in Zehlendorf

== Gallery ==
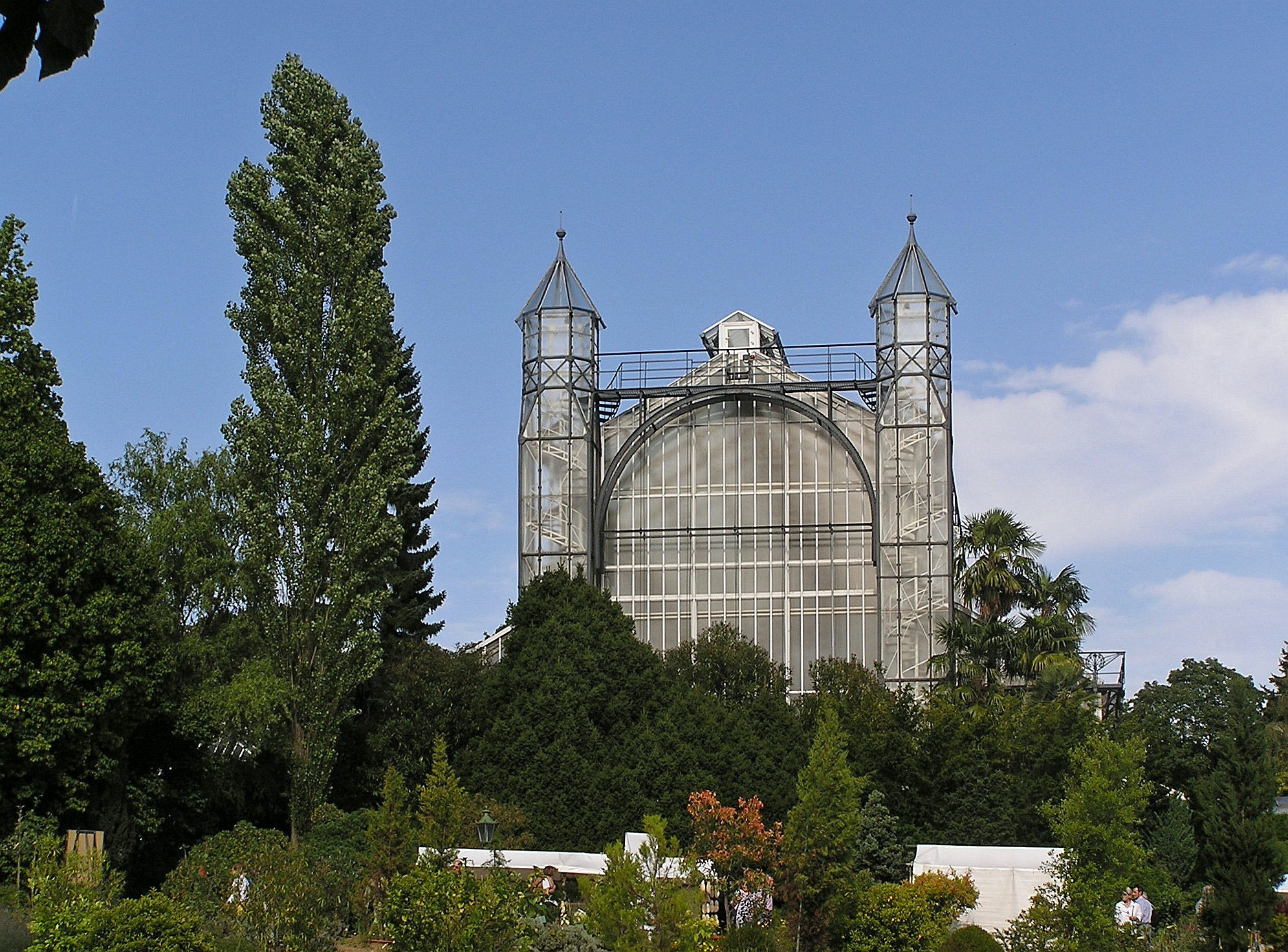
Botanical Garden

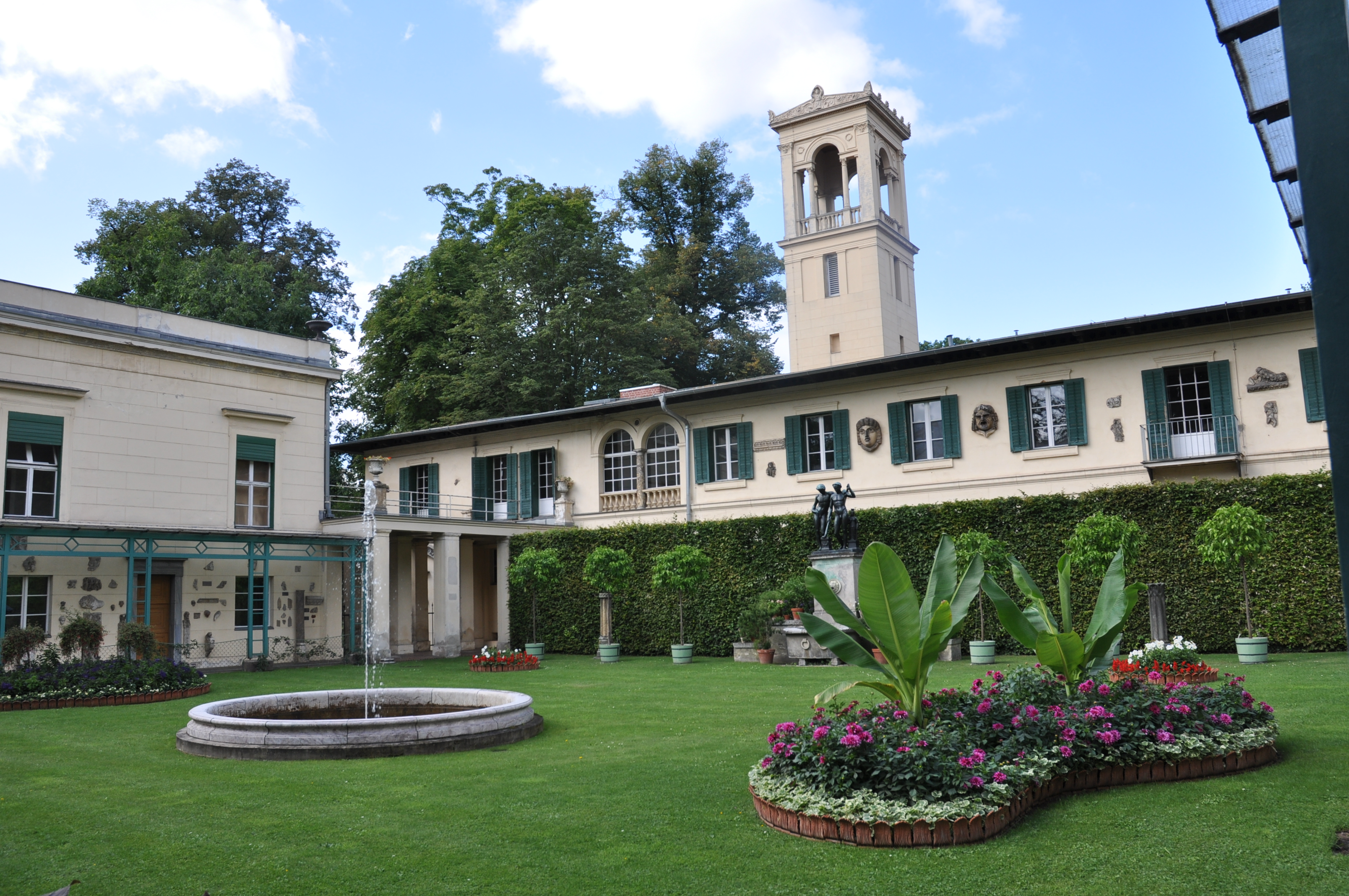
Glienicke Palace

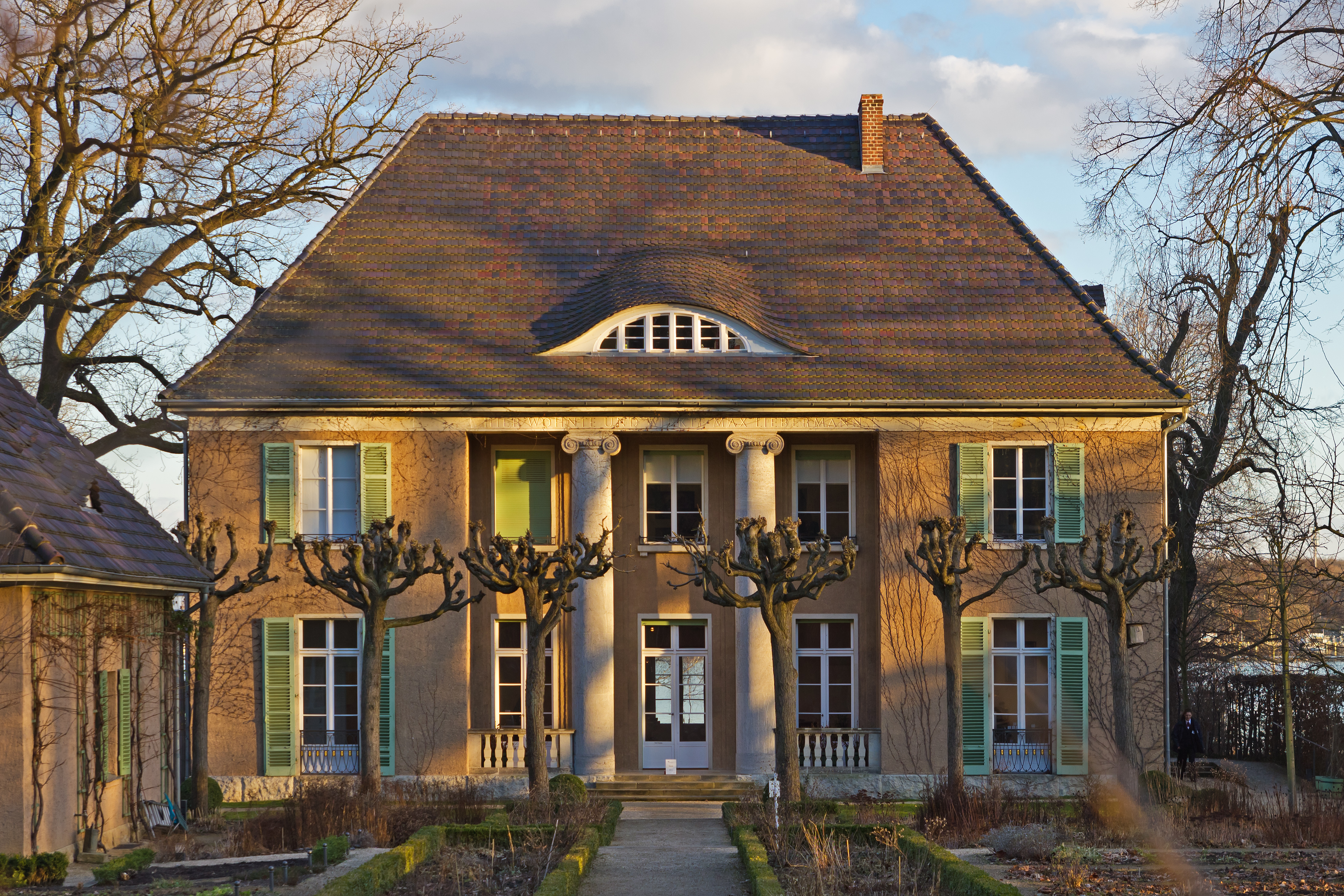
Liebermann Villa

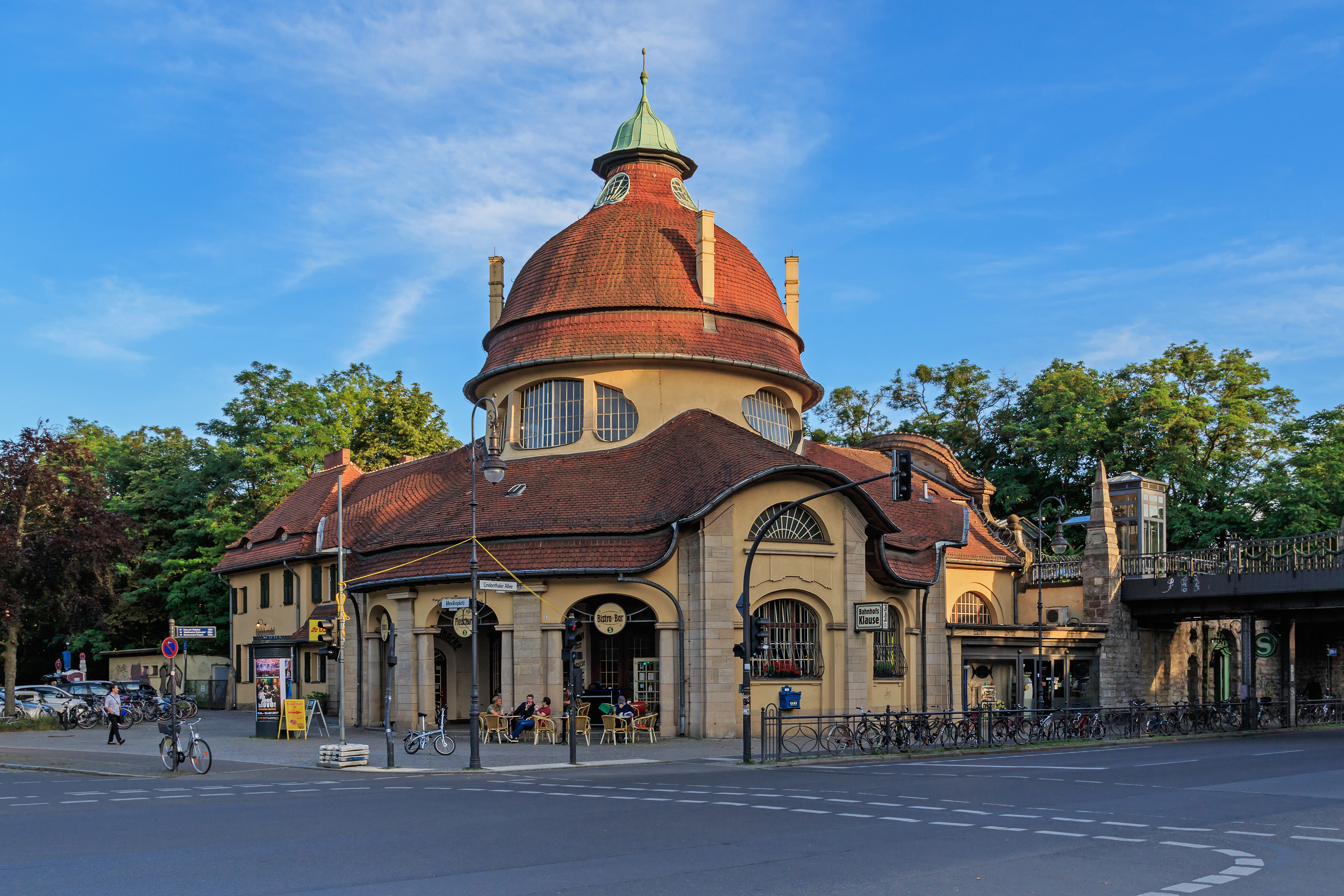
Mexikoplatz railway station

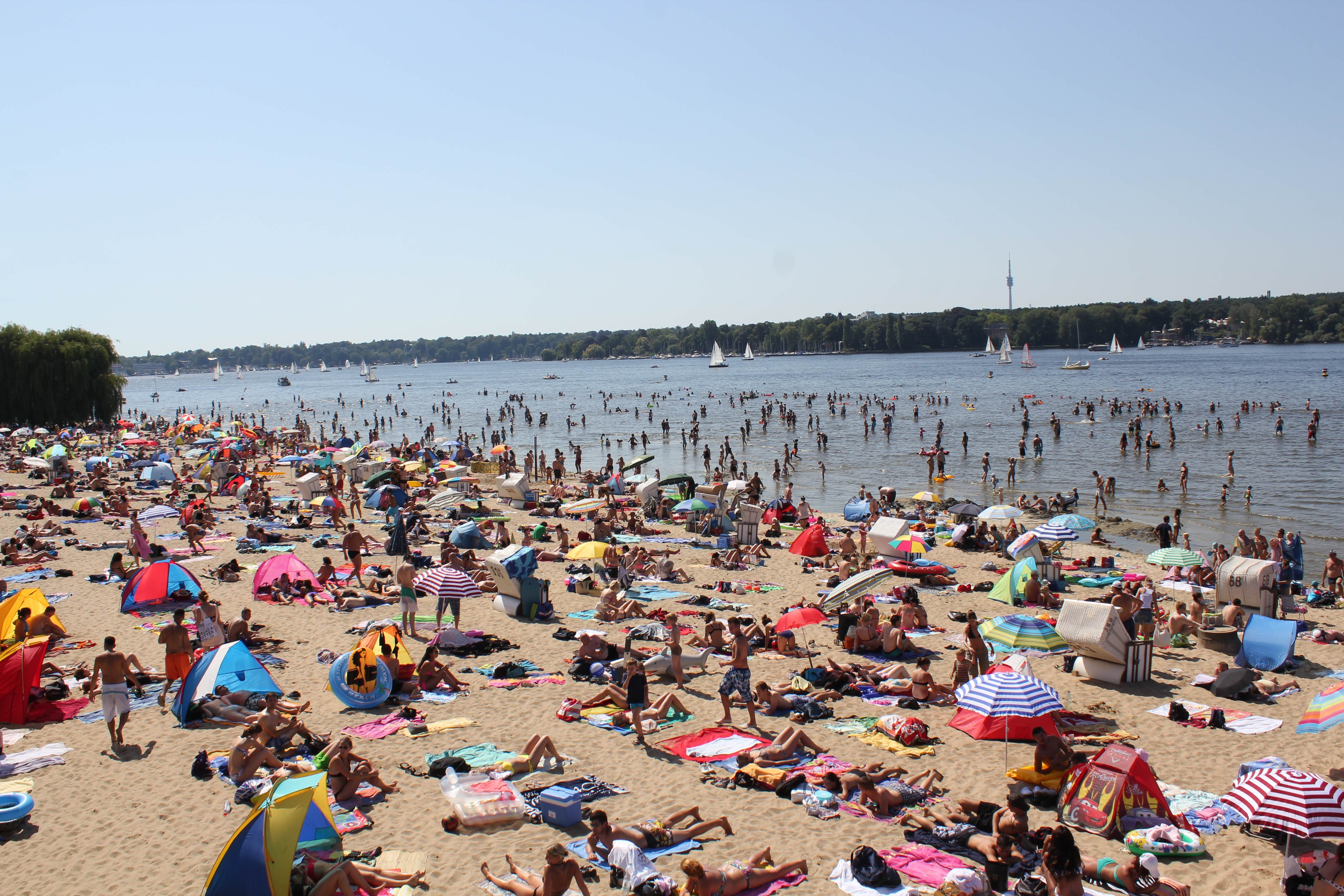
Beach at the Wannsee

== Education ==
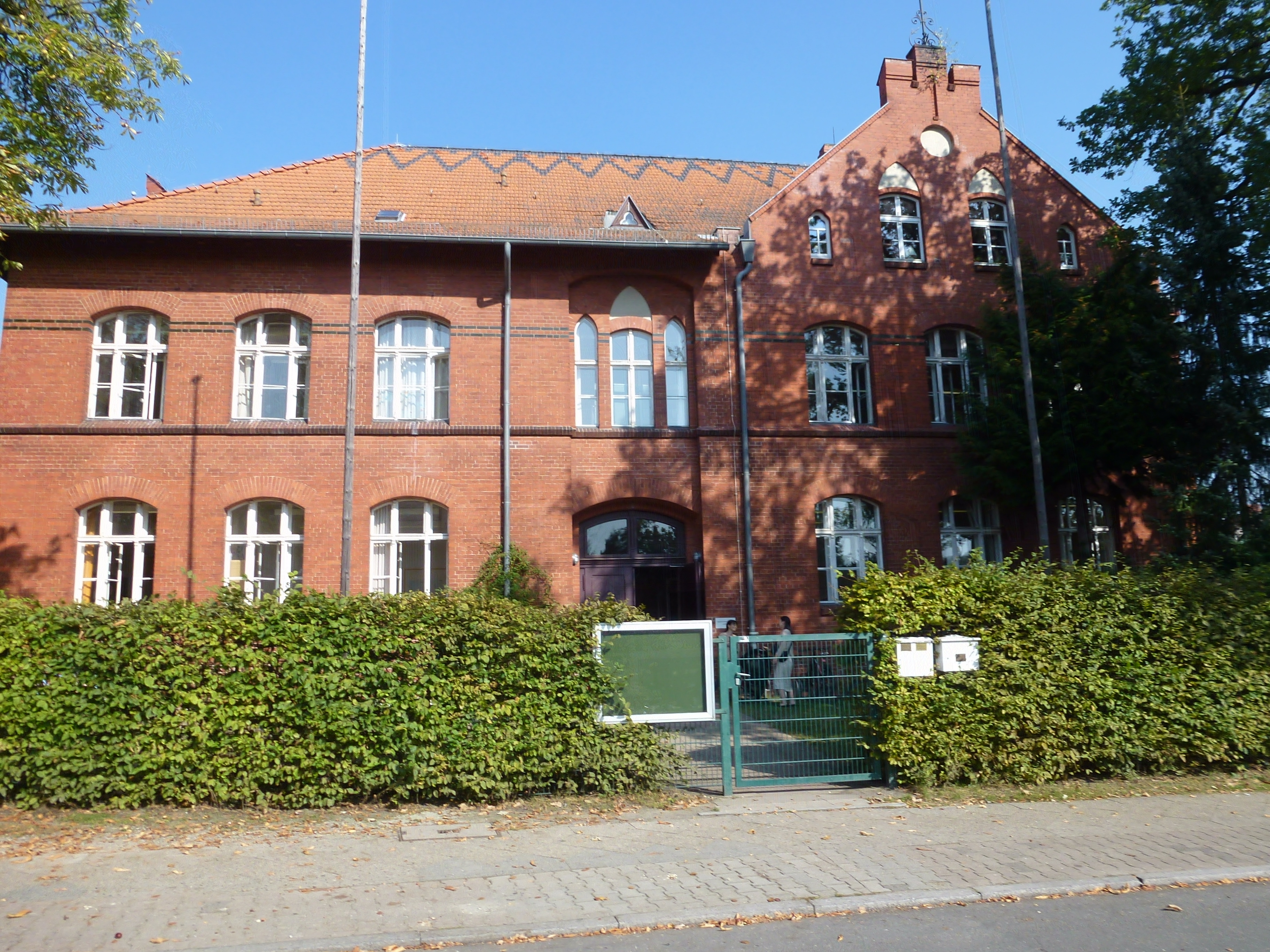
Japanische Internationale Schule zu Berlin

=== Gymnasiums ===
- Arndt-Gymnasium Dahlem in Dahlem
- Beethoven-Gymnasium in Lankwitz
- Dreilinden-Gymnasium in Nikolassee
- Droste-Hülshoff-Schule in Zehlendorf
- Fichtenberg-Oberschule in Steglitz
- Goethe-Gymnasium in Lichterfelde
- Gymnasium Steglitz in Steglitz
- Hermann-Ehlers-Gymnasium in Steglitz
- Königin-Luise-Stiftung in Dahlem
- Lilienthal-Gymnasium in Lichterfelde
- Paulsen-Gymnasium in Steglitz
- Schadow-Gymnasium in Zehlendorf
- Werner-von-Siemens-Gymnasium in Nikolassee
- Willi-Graf-Gymnasium in Lichterfelde
- Freie Schule Anne-Sophie Berlin in Zehlendorf

=== Locations for science ===
- American Academy in Berlin
- Biologische Bundesanstalt für Land- und Forstwirtschaft
- Centre for Modern Oriental Studies
- Charité – Campus Benjamin Franklin
- German Federal Archives - branch office Berlin: central archive of the German Reich and the GDR
- Federal Institute for Materials Research and Testing
- Freie Universität Berlin (Free University of Berlin) in Dahlem
  - Philological Library of Freie Universität Berlin
  - Otto Suhr Institute for Political Science
- German Archaeological Institute
- Helmholtz-Zentrum Berlin für Materialien und Energie
- Institute for Museum Research
- Japanische Internationale Schule zu Berlin, a Japanese international school, is in the Wannsee community in Steglitz-Zehlendorf.
- Krankenhaus Waldfriede
- Max Planck Society
  - Fritz Haber Institute of the Max Planck Society
  - Max Planck Institute for Human Development
  - Max Planck Institute for Molecular Genetics
  - Max Planck Institute for the History of Science
- Prussian Privy State Archives
- Zuse Institute Berlin

== Twin towns – sister cities ==
Steglitz-Zehlendorf is twinned with:

- Brøndby, Denmark (1968)
- Cassino, Italy (1969)
- Hagen, Germany (1967)
- Industrialnyi (Kharkiv), Ukraine (1990)
- Kazimierz Dolny, Poland (1993)
- Kiryat Bialik, Israel (1966)
- Königs Wusterhausen, Germany (1988)
- Lüchow-Dannenberg, Germany (1979)
- Nałęczów, Poland (1993)
- Nentershausen, Germany (1966)
- Poniatowa, Poland
- Rendsburg-Eckernförde, Germany (1964)
- Ronneby, Sweden (1976)
- Sderot, Israel (1975)
- Sochos, Greece (1993)
- Songpa (Seoul), South Korea (2013)
- Szilvásvárad, Hungary (1989)
- Westerwald, Germany (1970)
- Zugló (Budapest), Hungary (2008)

In 2020 Steglitz-Zehlendorf dissociated itself from its twin town of Kazimierz Dolny in Poland because the latter declared itself an LGBT free zone. There is a debate about terminating the partnership.

== People ==
- Walter Fritzsche (1895–1956), football player
- Wolfgang Krause (1895–1970), philologist
- Kurt Aland (1915–1994), theologian and biblical scholar
- Maria Sebaldt (1930–2023), actress
- Nils Seethaler (born 1981), Anthropologist

== See also ==
- Berlin-Steglitz-Zehlendorf (electoral district)
