= Düppel (Berlin) =

Neighbourhood as well as an adjacent forest in Berlin, Germany

Coordinates: 52°25′45″N 13°14′14″E

Düppel (after Dybbøl, South Jutland, Denmark) is the name of a neighbourhood as well as of an adjacent forest in the borough of Steglitz-Zehlendorf in southwestern Berlin, Germany. The neighbourhood itself is a part of the Zehlendorf locality.

== History ==
Archaeological finds indicate a Slavic settlement established about 1170. In 1242 the Margraves John I and Otto III of Brandenburg sold the area together with the neighbouring village of Zehlendorf to Lehnin Abbey. The Slavic village became abandoned about 1300, from 1975 on parts of it have been reconstructed as an open-air museum.

In 1830 royal forester Friedrich Bensch built a mansion here, that was acquired by Prince Frederick Charles of Prussia in 1859. In view of his victorious command in the 1864 Battle of Dybbøl he received the title "Düppel Manor" for his estates. In 1928 Düppel was incorporated into Greater Berlin.

After World War II Düppel was part of the American sector of West Berlin. In January 1946, the US Army established a large displaced persons (DP) camp here to accommodate the Jewish refugees fleeing from Poland in the wake of anti-Jewish violence, many of whom subsequently made their way to the American Zone in the western part of Germany. At its peak, in September 1946, the camp, which was known as Düppel Center or Schlachtensee DP Camp, housed 5,130 Jewish displaced persons. It eventually had its own elementary and religious schools, a sports club, a theater group, and a Yiddish-language newspaper. In July 1948, during the Berlin Blockade, Düppel Center was hastily evacuated and closed, with most of the residents being flown out to Frankfurt am Main, from where they were transferred to other DP camps. The facility then served for the placement of refugees arriving from the German Democratic Republic and East Berlin. Today Düppel is the site of a small lower security prison with about 170 inmates.
