= Schlachtensee (lake) =

Lake in Berlin, Germany

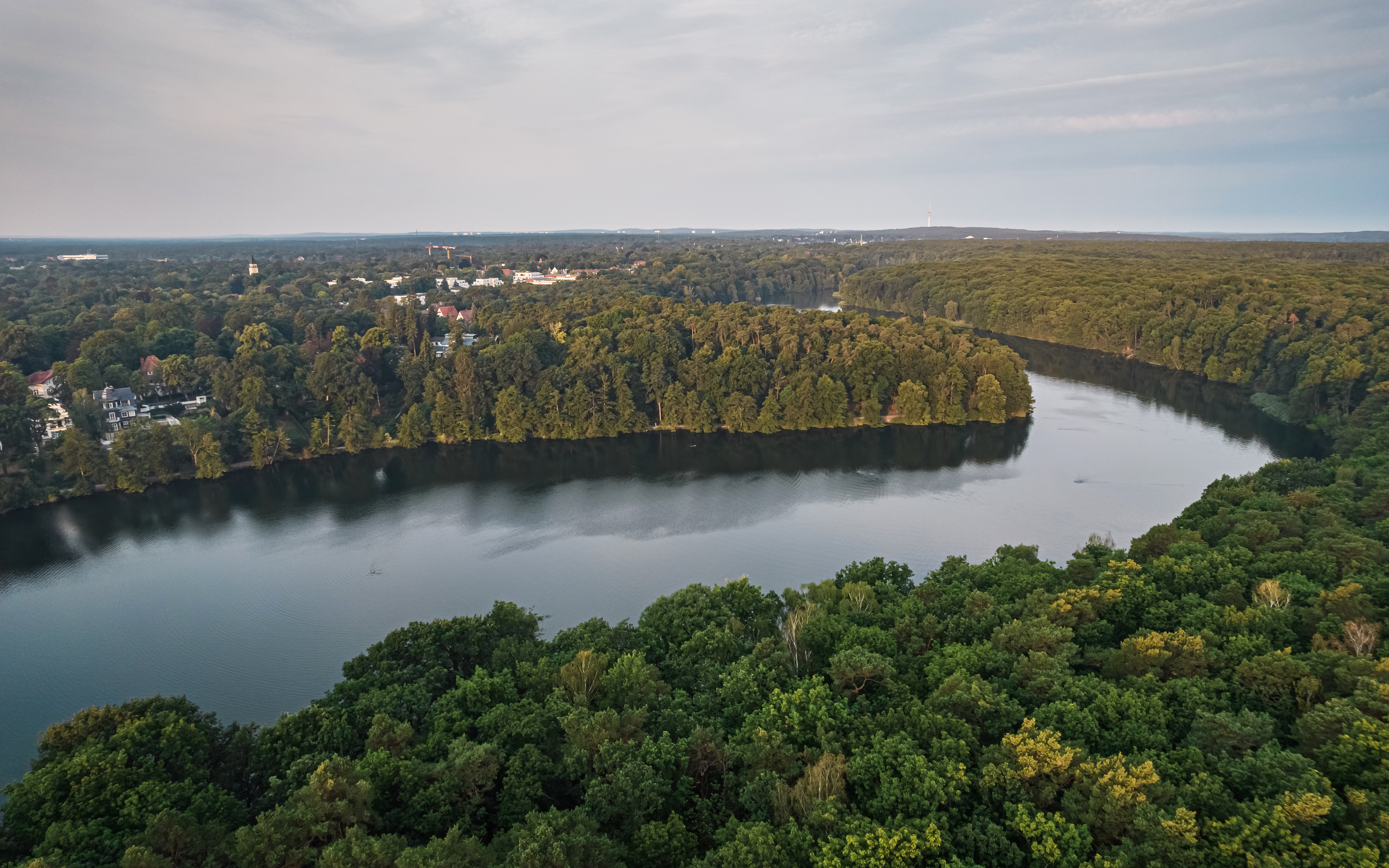
- Aerial photograph, 2022

- Location within Germany
- Location: Berlin, Germany
- Coordinates: 52°26′34″N 13°13′00″E
- Surface area: 42.1 ha (104 acres)
- Max. depth: 8.5 m (28 ft)
- Shore length^{1}: 5.5 km (3.4 mi)
- ^{1} Shore length is not a well-defined measure.

Schlachtensee (German pronunciation: [ˈʃlaxtn̩ˌzeː]) is a lake in the south west of Berlin, in the Steglitz-Zehlendorf borough (in the quarters of Schlachtensee), on the edge of the Grunewald forest. The lake lends its name to the surrounding area and to the nearby Studentendorf Schlachtensee, a student residence. The area has been part of Berlin since 1920.

== Geography and Paul-Ernst Park ==
Schlachtensee is the most southerly in the Grunewald chain of lakes, which belongs geologically to the Teltow plateau, and was emerged some 15,000 years ago from the ice age as a glacial trough. With a surface area of around 0.42 square kilometres (100 acres), a volume of 1,970,000 cubic metres (70,000,000 cu ft) and a maximum depth of 9 metres (30 ft), it is one of the larger lakes in Berlin. The lake is popularly used for walking and for swimming, due to the good quality of the water.

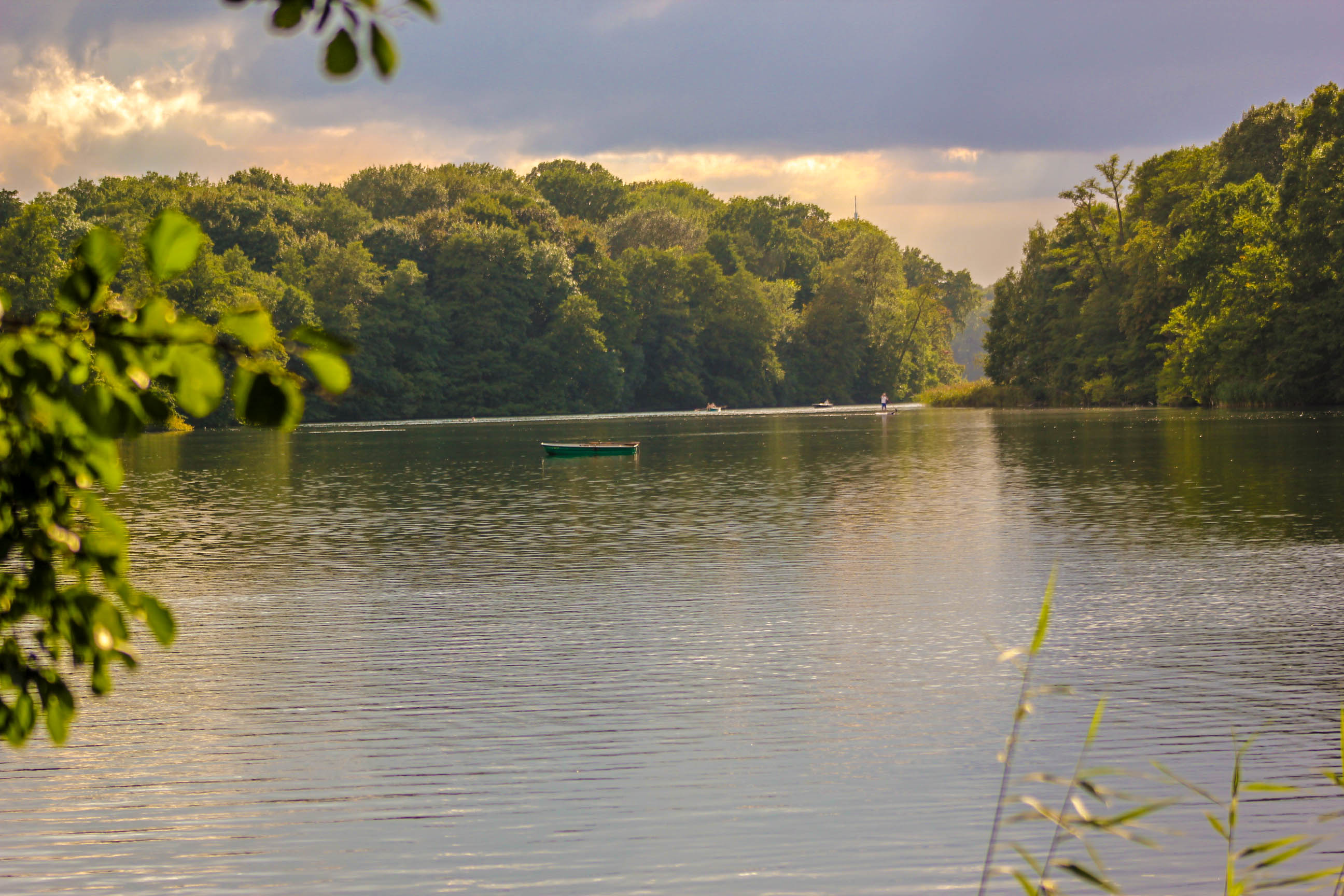
Schlachtensee in the Summer

The Paul-Ernst Park is located next to the S-Bahnhof Schlachtensee. The park is named for the writer, Paul Ernst (1866–1933), and contains a memorial stone. It is open to the public and runs down the slope to the lake and half a kilometer around the southern shore. At the end of the park is a large wooded area, while the area over the S-Bahn station is landscaped into lawns.

Since 2020, the lake is part of a new quarter of the same name.
