= Lichterfelde (Berlin) =

- Quarter of Berlin
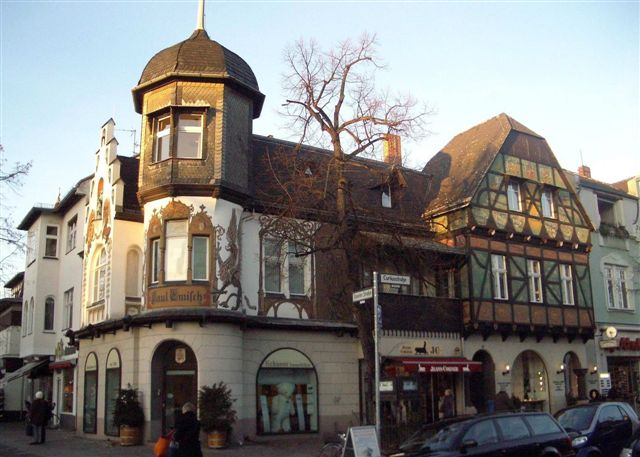
- "Emisch Haus" in Lichterfelde West

- Location of Lichterfelde in Steglitz-Zehlendorf and Berlin
- Interactive map of Lichterfelde
- Location within Germany Location within Berlin
- Coordinates: 52°26′00″N 13°19′00″E
- Country: Germany
- State: Berlin
- City: Berlin
- Borough: Steglitz-Zehlendorf
- Founded: 1300

Area
  - Total: 18.2 km^{2} (7.0 sq mi)
- Elevation: 50 m (160 ft)

Population (2024-12-31)
  - Total: 85,445
  - Density: 4,690/km^{2} (12,200/sq mi)
- Time zone: UTC+01:00 (CET)
  - Summer (DST): UTC+02:00 (CEST)
- Postal codes: 12203, 12205, 12207, 12209, 14167
- Vehicle registration: B

Lichterfelde (German pronunciation: [ˈlɪçtɐˌfɛldə]) is a locality in the borough of Steglitz-Zehlendorf in Berlin, Germany. Until 2001 it was part of the former borough of Steglitz, along with Steglitz and Lankwitz. Lichterfelde is home to institutions like the Berlin Botanical Garden and Museum, the German Federal Intelligence Service (BND), the German Federal Archives and the Charité university hospital's Benjamin Franklin Campus. Many embassies and landmark-protected buildings are located in the affluent mansion settlement in Lichterfelde West.

== History ==
The Prussian village Lichtervelde was founded in the 13th century by Flemish settlers. It witnessed considerable growth in the 19th century when the two "villa colonies" of Lichterfelde-West and Lichterfelde-Ost were founded: elegant settlements for wealthy Berliners consisting completely of villas or mansions. These settlements and the historical villages of |Lichterfelde and Giesensdorf were united in 1880 under the name Groß-Lichterfelde (Greater Lichterfelde).

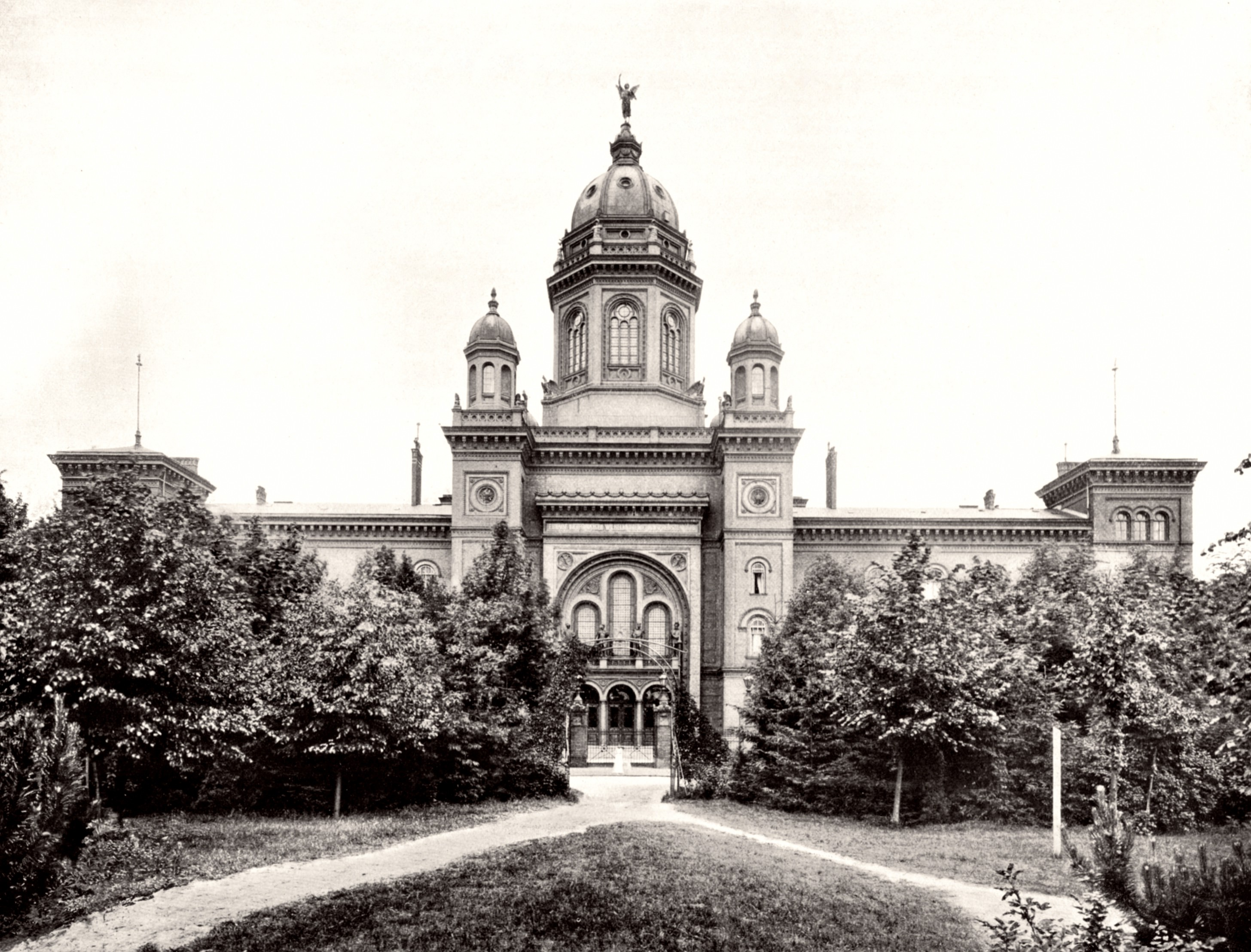
Preußische Hauptkadettenanstalt

Lichterfelde was chosen as the seat of the Prussian Main Military academy, the Preußische Hauptkadettenanstalt, in 1882, and the district became the home to many famous families from the German nobility due to their connections with the Prussian Army. The world's first commercially successful electrified tram line, the Gross-Lichterfelde tramway, opened between the Lichterfelde-Ost railway station and the Hauptkadettenanstalt in 1881.

In 1920 Lichterfelde became part of Greater Berlin. Between 1920 and 1933, the former military academy in Lichterfelde was used by the Berlin Police. From 1933 to 1945, the grounds of the military academy were the home of the Leibstandarte SS Adolf Hitler. During this same period, the anti-Nazi Kreisau Circle resistance group surrounding Count Peter Yorck von Wartenburg and Helmuth James Graf von Moltke held their secret meetings inside Wartenburg's apartment on Hortensienstraße 50, Lichterfelde-West, during the Third Reich. Generaloberst Ludwig Beck had his house on Goethestraße 24 in Lichterfelde-Ost. In 1942–1945, Lichterfelde was the location of a subcamp of the Sachsenhausen concentration camp. There were seven known escape attempts, five successful.

From 1945 to 1994 the Hauptkadettenanstalt was in use as "Andrews Barracks" by the United States Army's Berlin Brigade. Today it belongs to the German Federal Archives, headquartered in Koblenz. Two other kasernes "Roosevelt Barracks" in Gardeschützen-Kaserne (former seat of the Prussian Army's Guards Rifles Battalion) and "McNair Barracks", a former Telefunken manufacturing plant on Goerzallee were nearby.

While Lichterfelde-Ost was in parts badly damaged during World War II, Lichterfelde West is still largely intact and today one of the prime residential areas of Berlin. The Lichterfelde locality also houses the Berlin-Dahlem Botanical Garden and Botanical Museum and the Campus Benjamin Franklin, built in 1968 and today part of the Charité university hospital.

== Quarters of Lichterfelde ==
=== Lichterfelde West ===
Lichterfelde West was developed as a settlement of mansions and is one of the wealthiest residential areas of Berlin. It is home to the Berlin Botanical Garden and embassies. The Teltow Canal geographically separates it from the eastern parts of Lichterfelde. Its 19th-century commercial area is centered around the Lichterfelde West railway station, which also serves nearby Free University of Berlin in neighboring Dahlem. Most of the commercial and residential buildings in Lichterfelde West are protected landmarks.

=== Lichterfelde Ost ===
Lichterfelde Ost, like Lichterfelde West, was also developed as a settlement of mansions, yet many of the estates were damaged in World War II. The Lichterfelde Ost railway station serves as a hub for regional rail and commuter rail and is surrounded by a large commercial area.

=== Lichterfelde Süd ===
Lichterfelde Süd was developed in the 1960s and 1970s and is large made up of suburban housing estates, being a significant architectural deviation from the older mansion settlements. The Otto Lilienthal Memorial Park with the artificial conical hill, from which he started many of his flight attempts, is located in Lichterfelde Süd.

== Sights ==
- Otto Lilienthal monument - the memorial plaque which is located in Schütte-Lanz-Straße 25, Berlin-Lichterfelde, was built in memory of Otto Lilienthal - a German pioneer of human aviation who became known as the Glider King. He was the first person to make successful gliding flights.
- Berlin Botanical Garden and Botanical Museum
- Lichterfelde Manor - historic manor house of the former village Lichterfelde
- Lichterfelde West - a villa colony from the 19th century
- Lichterfelde village church - Church from the 14th century
- McNair Barracks - former US Army installation in Lichterfelde, today a residential building
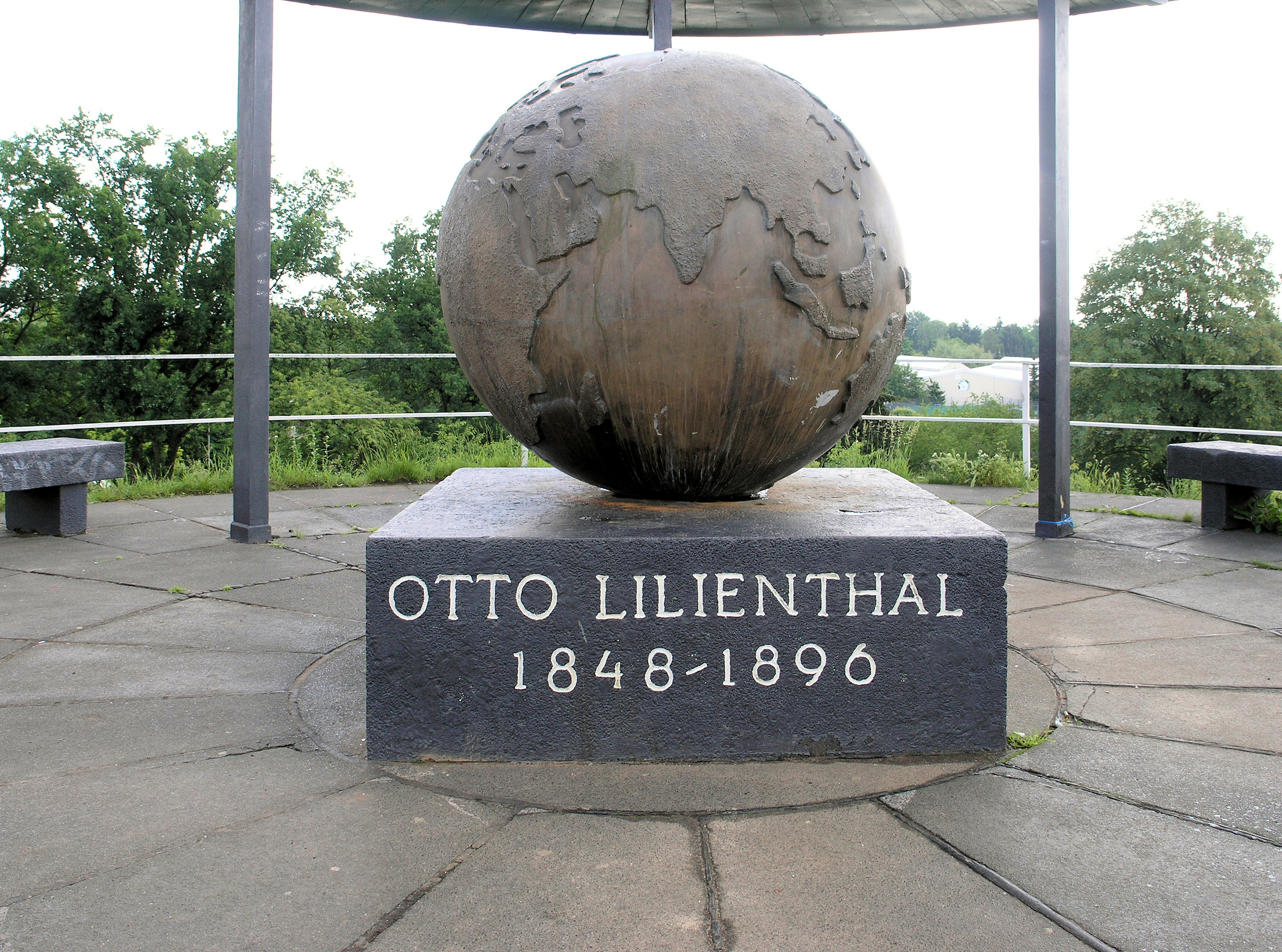
Gedenktafel Schütte-Lanz-Str 25 (Lichf) Otto Lilienthal

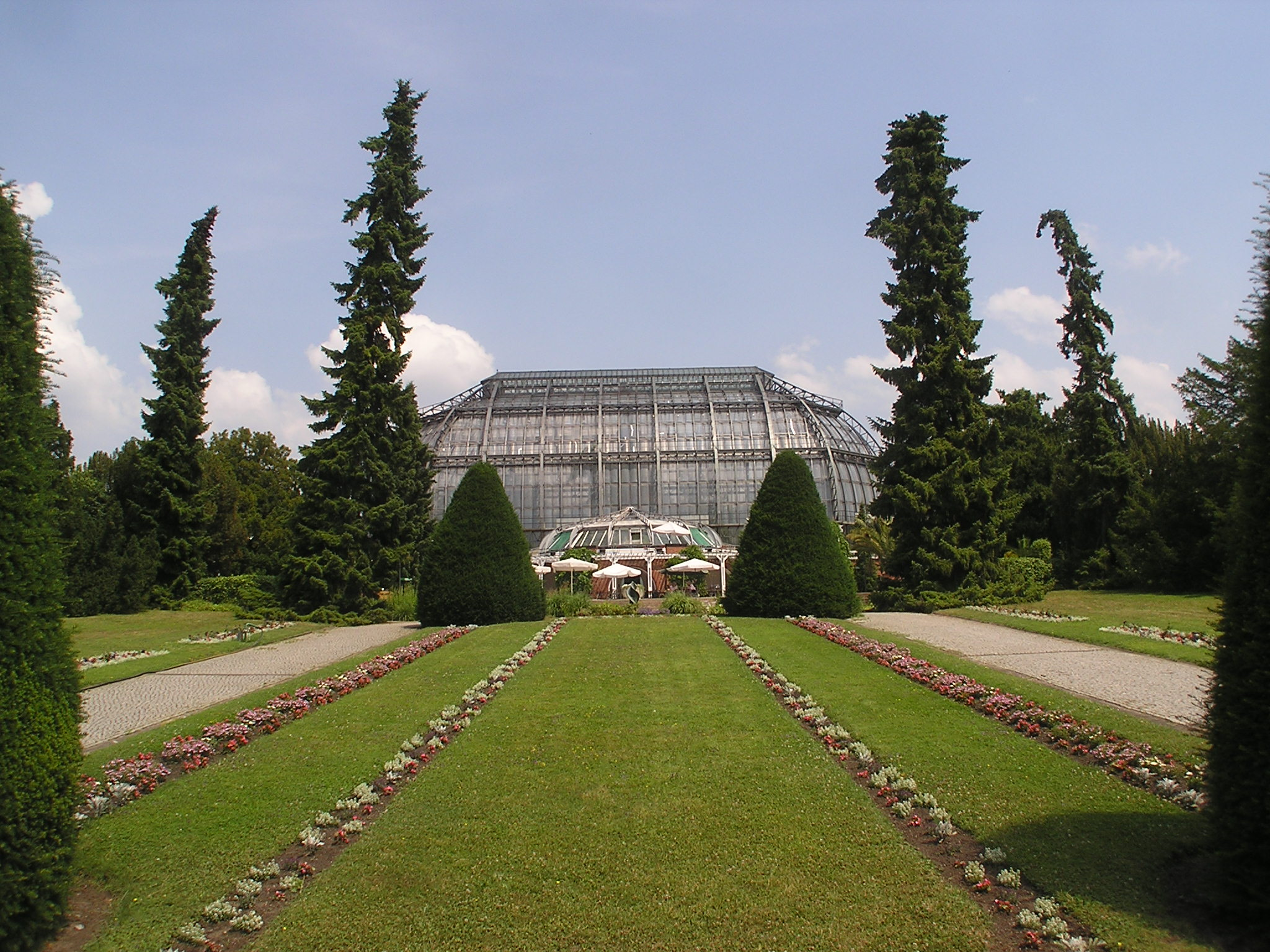
Berlin Botanical Garden and Botanical Museum

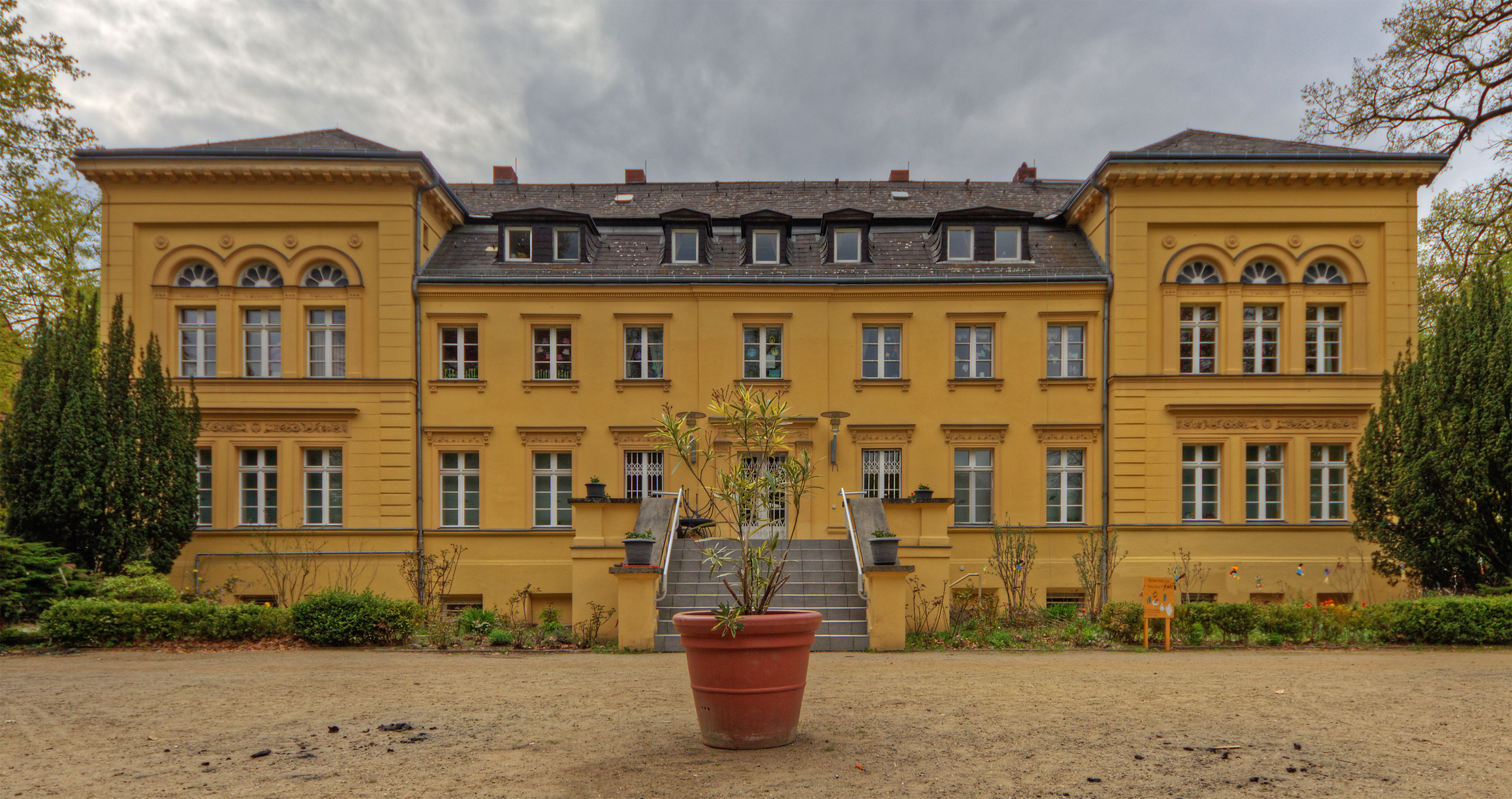
Lichterfelde Manor (Gutshaus Lichterfelde)

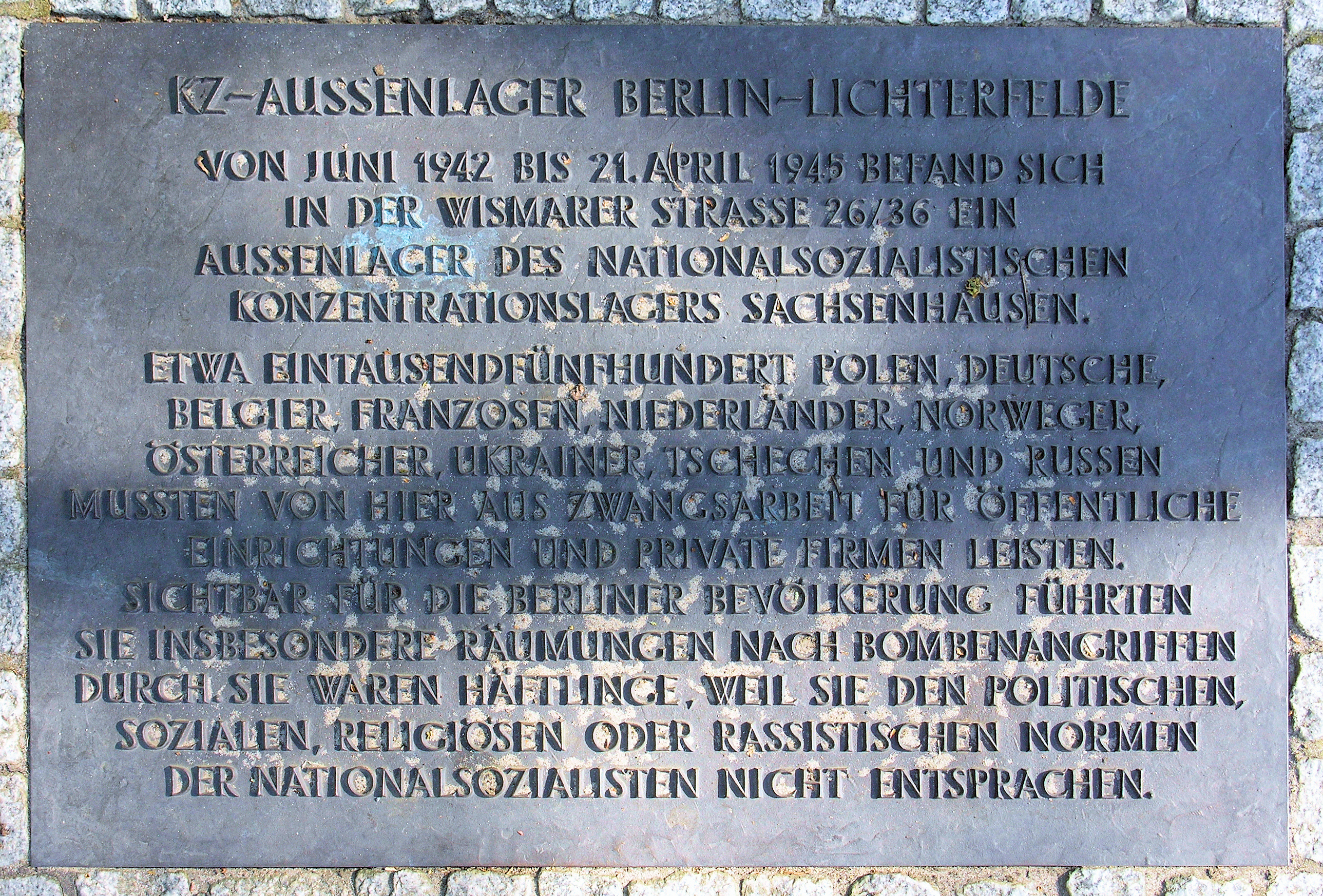
Memorial plaque, KZ Aussenlager Lichterfelde, Wismarer Straße 26

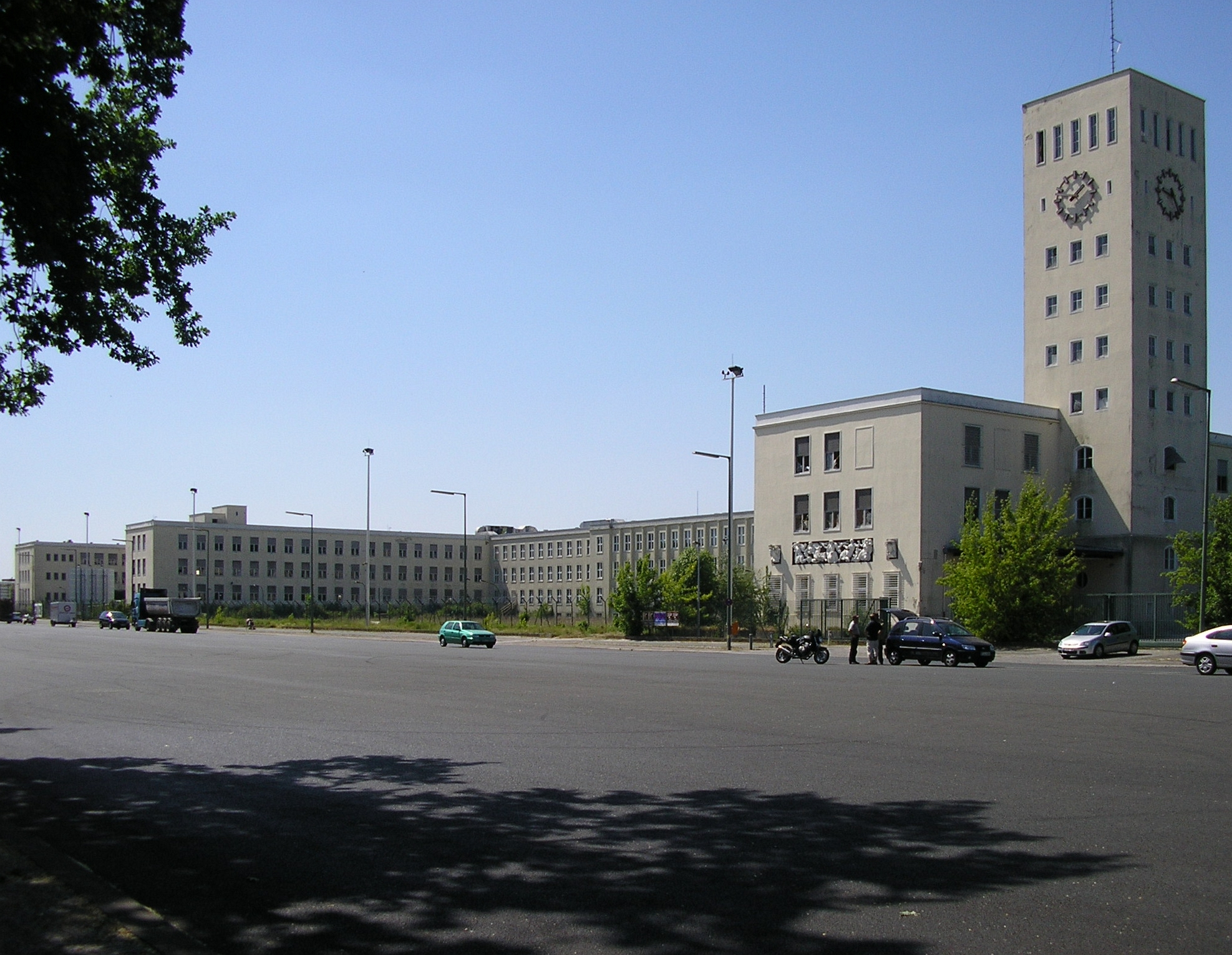
Telefunken Headquarters, later McNair Barracks

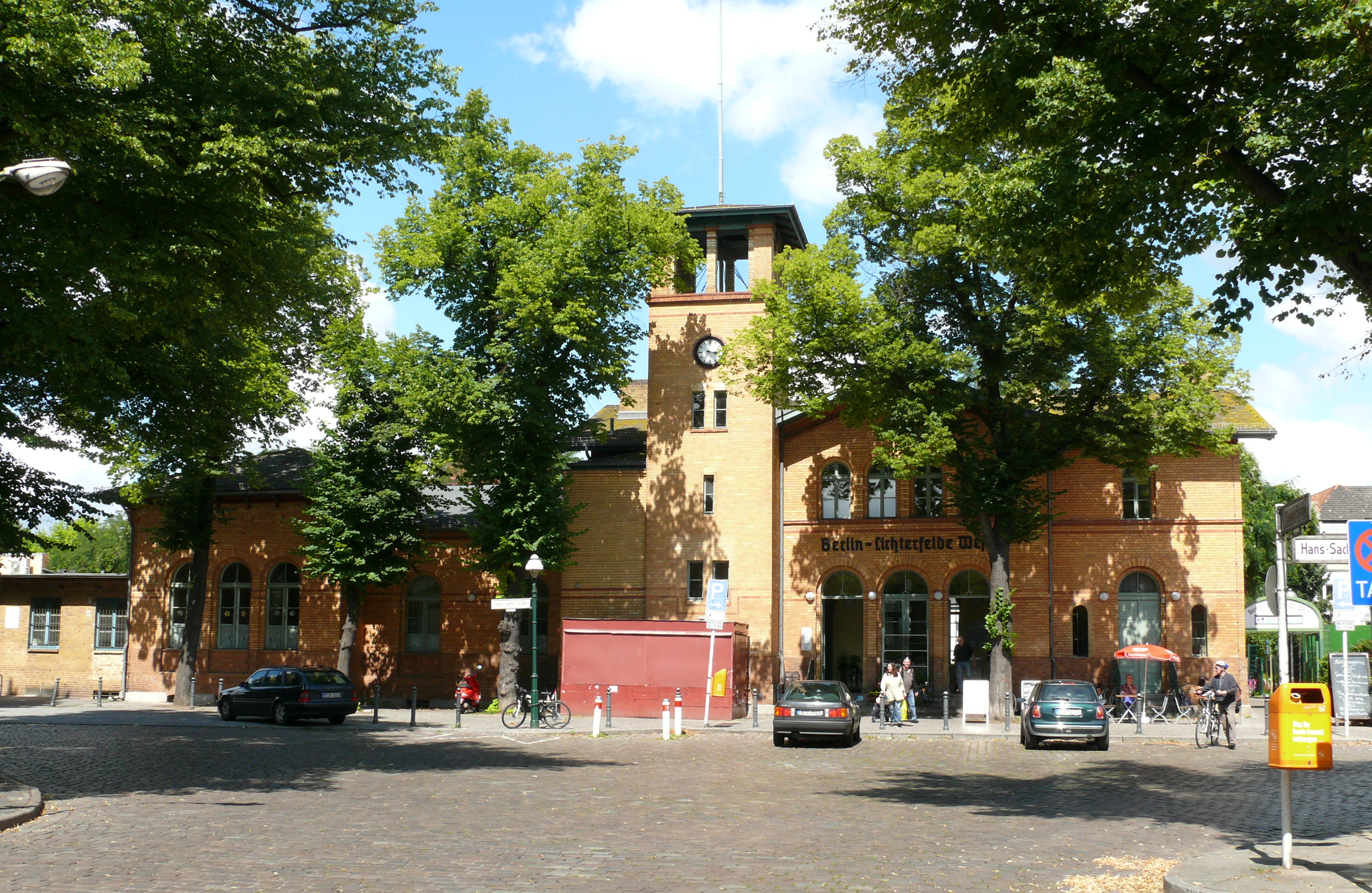
Berlin-Lichterfelde West station

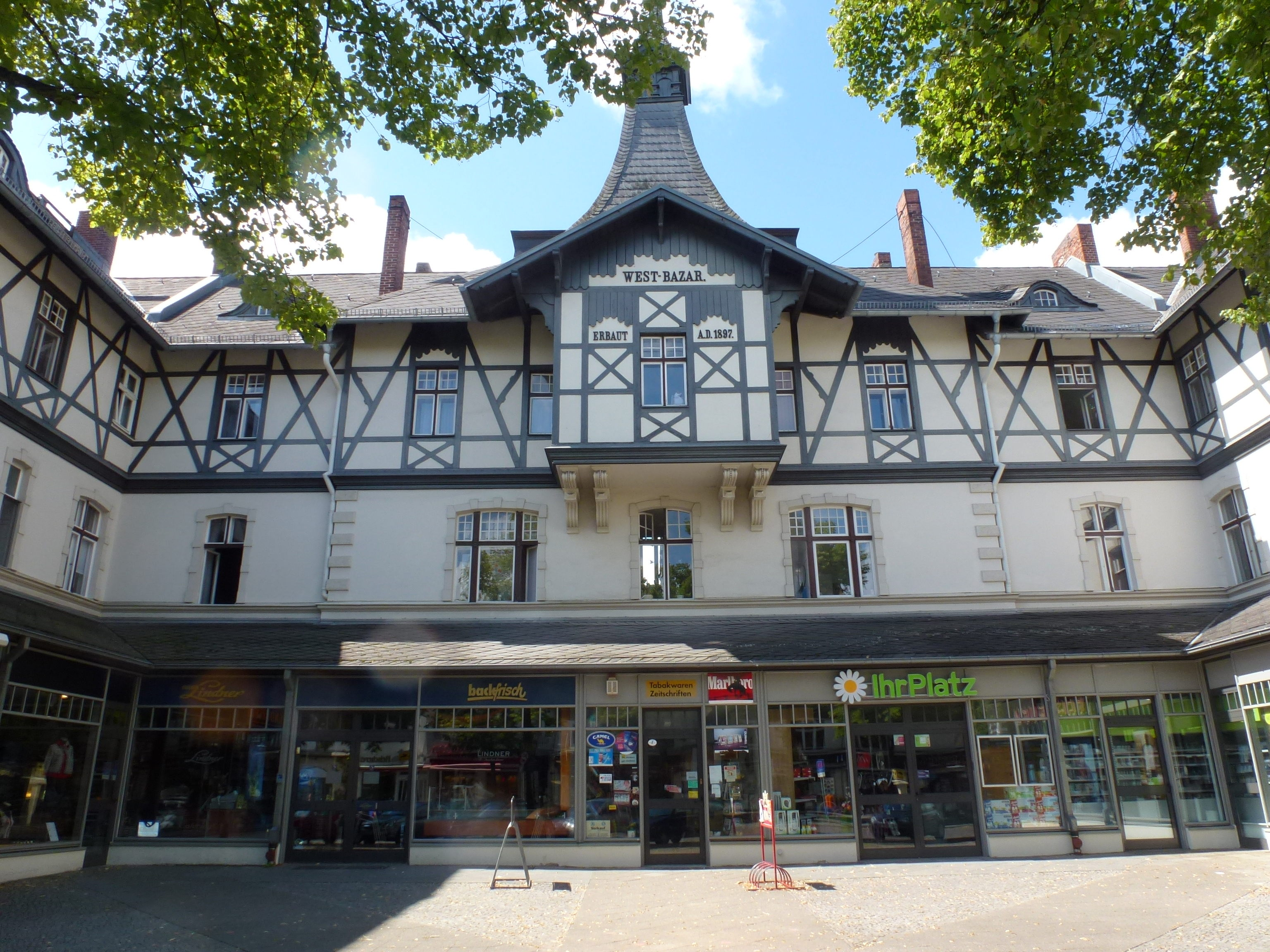
West Bazar

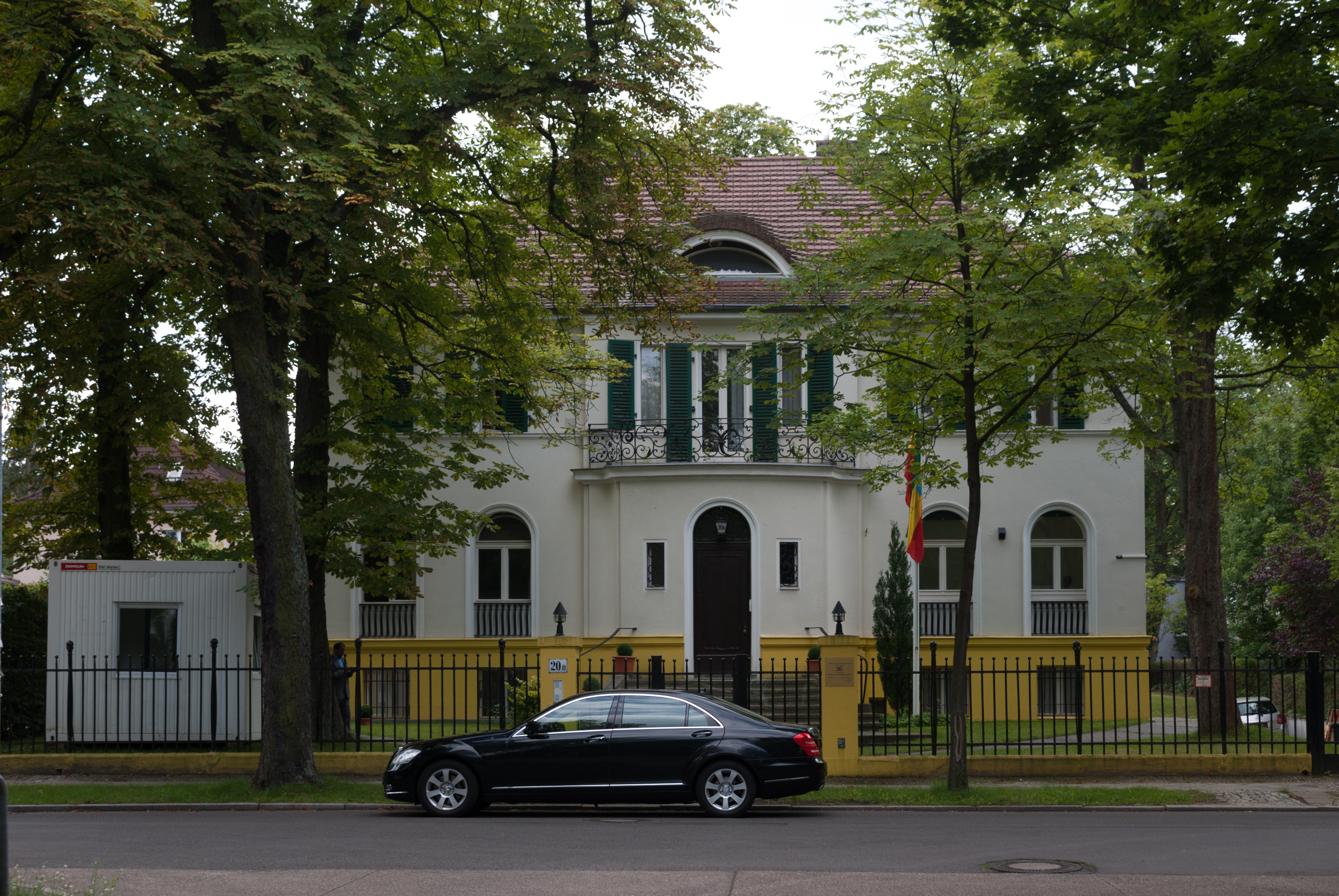
Embassy of Ethiopia

== Important people ==
=== Sons and daughters of the district ===
- Maximilian Beyer, Catholic pastor
- Hasso von Boehmer, Lieutenant Colonel in the General Staff, murdered resistance fighter on 20 July 1944
- Bully Buhlan, singer
- Fler, rapper
- Peter Fox, musician
- Götz George, actor
- Peter Huchel, writer
- Rolf Johannesson, Rear Admiral of the German Navy
- Max Kaus, painter and graphic artist
- Julius Posener, architectural historian
- Samra, rapper
- Nils Seethaler, Anthropologist
- Gerd Tellenbach, historian
- Bettina Wegner, songwriter and poet

=== Celebrities at the Lichterfelde park cemetery ===
The following personalities were buried in the Parkfriedhof Lichterfelde among many others:

- Drafi Deutscher, singer and composer
- Otto Dibelius, bishop
- Walter de Gruyter, publisher
- Sebastian Haffner, historian and publicist
- Robert Koldewey, archaeologist
- Gustav Lilienthal, architect
- Reinhold Poss, aviation pioneer
- Kurt von Schleicher, Reich Chancellor
- Arthur Werner, first Lord Mayor of Berlin after the Second World War
- Bruno Wille, writer and co-founder of the Freie Volksbühne

== See also ==
- Berlin-Lichterfelde Ost railway station
- Lichterfelde Süd station
- Berlin-Lichterfelde West station
- Berlin Botanischer Garten station
- Osdorfer Straße station
