= USAB =

USAB may refer to:

- United States Army Berlin
- USA Baseball, the governing body of baseball in the United States
- USA Basketball, the governing body of basketball in the United States
