= Berlin Brigade =

Cold War-era United States Army brigade based in Berlin

- US Army's Berlin Brigade patch
- Active: 31 October 1945–15 August 1994
- Country: United States
- Branch: United States Army
- Type: Reaction Force
- Size: Brigade
- Part of: United States Army Europe
- Garrison/HQ: West Berlin, Federal Republic of Germany

Commanders
- Notable commanders: Hugh P. Harris; Frederick O. Hartel

The Berlin Brigade was a US Army brigade-sized garrison based in West Berlin during the Cold War. After the end of World War II, under the conditions of the Yalta and Potsdam agreements, the Allied forces occupied West Berlin. This occupation lasted throughout the Cold War. The French Army also had units in Berlin, called French Forces in Berlin and the British Army's unit in Berlin was the Berlin Infantry Brigade.

== History ==
After the dissolution of the First Allied Airborne Army in mid-1945, the United States Army troops of the combined U.S.-British force became simply the First Airborne Army and were dispatched to Berlin. DA Pamphlet 672-1 indicates the 1st Airborne Army received occupation credit for 5 July - 31 October 1945 in Germany. In October the army headquarters was inactivated and replaced with a new Berlin District headquarters. Key U.S. forces arriving in Berlin during this period were the 2nd Armored Division; 16th Cavalry Group; and 82nd Airborne Division. Several changes of name included Berlin District (1945–46); Berlin Command (1946–48, 1953–61); and then Berlin Brigade 16 January 1983–15 August 1994.

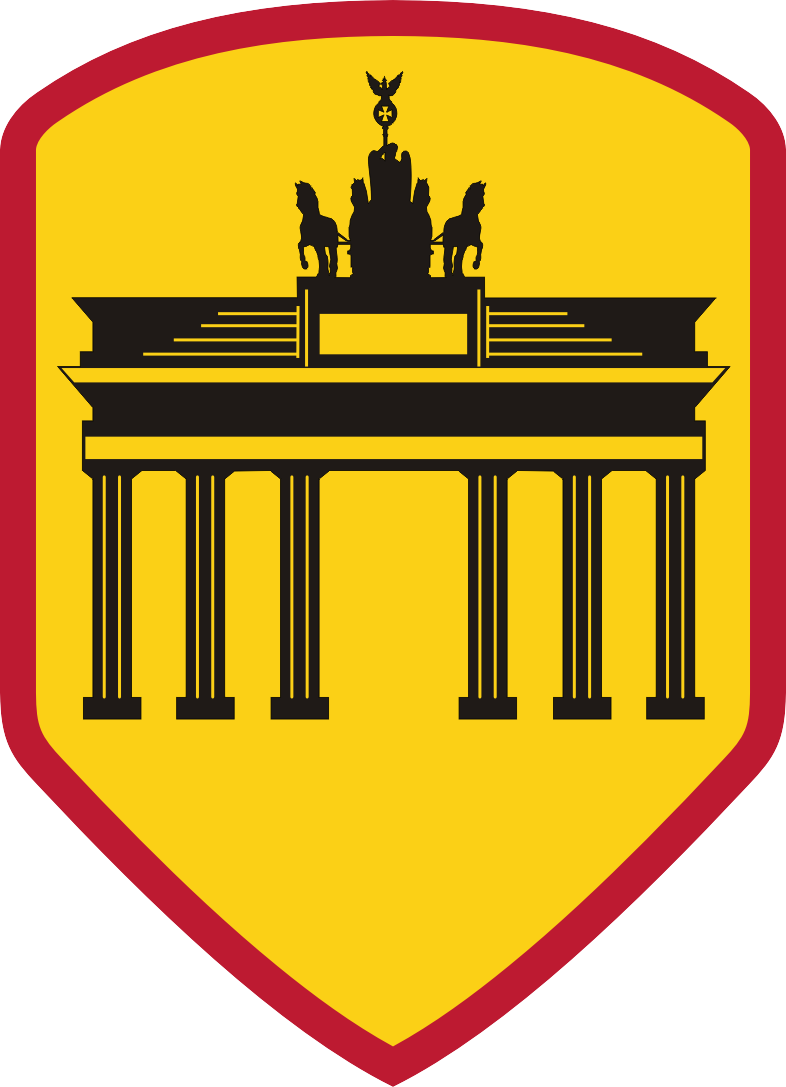
Berlin District / Command SSI 1946-1960

The Berlin Brigade was a U.S. separate brigade based in Berlin. Its shoulder sleeve insignia was the U.S. Army Europe patch with a Berlin tab, later incorporated.

The Brigade was based across four large installations in Steglitz-Zehlendorf: McNair, Andrews, Roosevelt and Turner barracks.

== Berlin Wall Crisis ==
During the Berlin Wall Crisis of 1961, the Army reorganized the command structure of the forces in Berlin and created the U.S. Army Berlin and the Berlin Brigade from the units already in the city. The 6th Infantry Regiment, active in West Germany since 1950, was reorganized in mid-1958 AD, according to the Pentomic structure: each battle group consisted of five line (rifle) companies, a combat support company and a headquarters & headquarters company. The Berlin Brigade had the 2nd and 3rd Battle Groups, 6th Infantry until 1963, when Army force structure abandoned battle groups, in favor of brigades and subordinate battalions.

The reorganized brigade consisted of the following units:

- 2^{d} Battalion, 6th Infantry
- 3^{d} Battalion, 6th Infantry
- 4th Battalion, 18th Infantry (reflagged on 13 September 1972, as the 4th Battalion, 6th Infantry)
- Battery C, 94th Field Artillery
- Company F (later, 6th Battalion), 40th Armor (Turner Barracks)
- 42^{d} Engineer Company
- 42^{d} AG Unit (Postal)
- 42^{d} Military Police Group (Customs) [attached elements]
- 287th Military Police Company (Separate)
- 43^{d} Chemical Detachment
- 76th Chemical Detachment
- 279th Station Hospital (became US Army Hospital in West Berlin, in 1976)
- 168th Medical Detachment (Veterinary Service)
- 592^{d} Signal Company
- 298th Army Band
- AFN Europe AM FM TV
- Rail Transportation Office (RTO) [Berlin Licherfelde West train station]
- Berlin Brigade Aviation Detachment (Tempelhof Central Airport)
- US Army Engineers - DEH Detachment Engineering & Housing (Von Steuben compound)
- US Military Liaison Mission in Potsdam - USMLM
- Detachment A – 39th Special Forces Detachment (1956-1984)

The 168th and 298th share the distinction of being the longest-serving units in Berlin. They both arrived in the city in a 37-vehicle convoy on 3 July 1945. The commanders of both units were old high school classmates.

The brigade's infantry battalions were reflagged again in 1984 as the 4th, 5th and 6th Battalions, 502nd Infantry, and Battery C, 94th FA was reflagged as Battery E, 320th Field Artillery.

== Cold War ==
From 1947 to 1987, brigade soldiers were tasked with month-long rotations at Spandau Prison. These rotations, shared with British, French and Soviet soldiers, continued until Spandau's last prisoner, Rudolf Hess, died in 1987. The U.S. had control of the prison in April, August and December

Cold War Era Photos in Berlin
Brigadier-General John E. Rogers (USA) and Lieutenant-Colonel Alexander Dorofeev (Soviet Union) at Spandau Prison, in 1981	Lieutenant-Colonel Alexander Dorofeev (Soviet Union), бригадный генерал John E. Rogers (USA), W. Berlin, 1 April 1981	Lieutenant-Colonel Alexander Dorofeev (Soviet Union) and Brigadier-General Leroy N. Suddath (USA) at Spandau Prison, in 1982	Soldiers of the Berlin Brigade guarding Spandau Prison

Until the end of the Cold War, members of the brigade were eligible for the Army of Occupation Medal with Germany clasp. Because of the legal status of West Berlin, it was technically occupied territory left over from World War II.

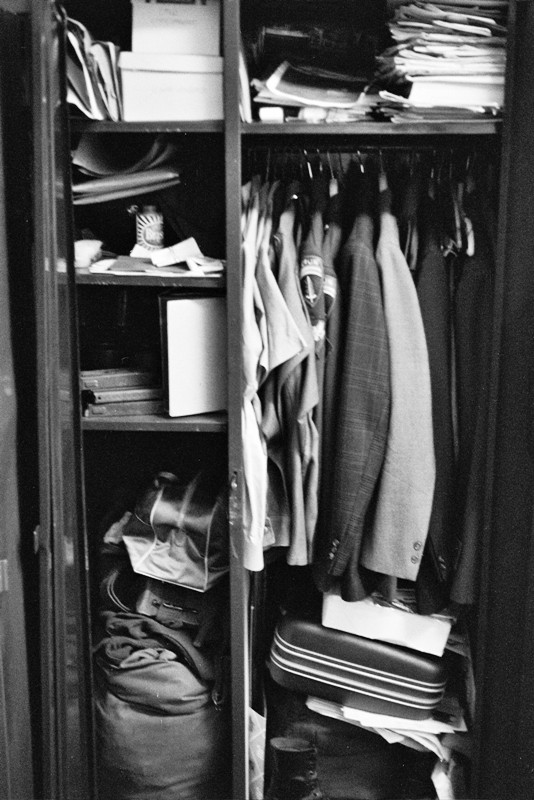
Contrasting roles of the Berlin troops—1970 soldier's jammed locker includes uniforms for a variety of duties along with big-city dress clothes

During the early 1980s, the U.S. Army Regimental System initiative renamed a large percentage of infantry, armor and artillery battalions to align overseas commands with units assigned to stateside brigades, reinforcing the Army's regimental designations and unit morale. The original intent was to initiate personnel replacement and rotations within regiments, a "next step" that did not provide sufficient flexibility to Army personnel managers. The impact on Berlin-based infantry battalions was to reflag the 2nd, 3rd and 4th Battalions, 6th Infantry as the 4th, 5th and 6th Battalions, 502nd Infantry, respectively, during the summer of 1984, assigning Berlin infantry units a shared identification with infantry battalions of 2^{d} Brigade, 101st Airborne Division (Air Assault) at Fort Campbell, Kentucky.

When the Berlin Wall fell in 1989, the operational structure of the brigade was as follows:

- Berlin Brigade
  - 4th Bn, 502^{d} Infantry (6 × M106, 12 × M901, 14 × M113, 8 × M125)
  - 5th Bn, 502^{d} Infantry (6 × M106, 12 × M901, 14 × M113, 8 × M125)
  - 6th Bn, 502^{d} Infantry (6 × M106, 12 × M901, 14 × M113, 8 × M125)
  - Combat Support Battalion
    - HHC (2x M1A1)
    - Company D, 40th Armor (14x M1A1)
    - Company F, 40th Armor (14x M1A1)
    - Battery E, 320th Field Artillery (8x M109A3)
    - 42^{d} Engineer Company (3x M728 CEV)
  - 42^{d} Postal Unit
  - 287th Military Police Company
  - 298th Army Band
  - AFN Europe AM FM TV
  - 43^{d} Chemical Detachment
  - 766th Military Intelligence Detachment
  - Berlin Brigade Aviation Detachment (6x Bell UH-1H, 2 × Pilatus UV-20A Chiricahua, 1 × Beechcraft C-12C Huron)
  - US Military Liaison Mission in Potsdam – USMLM
  - US Army Signal Support Company
  - US Army Physical Security Support Element – PSSE – 410th Special Forces Detachment (1984-1990)

== Cold War intelligence gathering ==
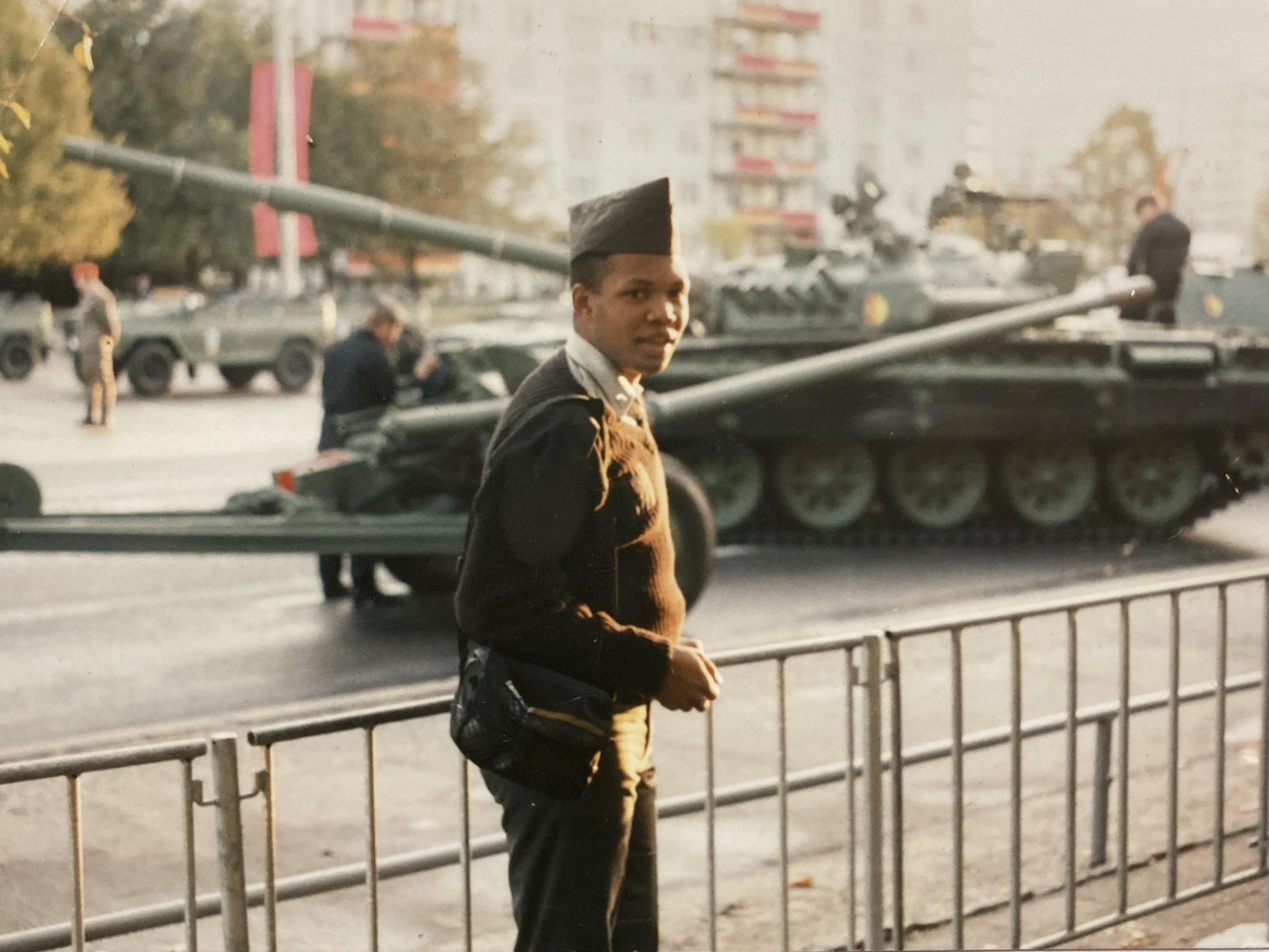
Specialist Antonio Bennett, 3rd US Army Berlin of the Brigade, Deputy Chief of Staff for Intelligence, as Observer at the 1988 May Day Parade in East Berlin. New weapon systems would often debut at Military Parades. East German T-72 Tank in the background.

=== U.S. Army Flag Tours 'Show the Flag' ===
Deputy Chief of Staff for Intelligence (DCSI or 'Dixie') 'Flag Tours' was administered from Building 2, Clay Headquarters, coordinated with The U.S. Army Military Liaison Mission in Berlin, to conduct visual intelligence gathering utilizing the existing 'Flag Tours'. Personnel assigned to DCSI were part of Headquarters & Headquarters Company, U.S. Army Berlin Brigade, Andrews Barracks, in Lichterfelde West.

The agreements between the allied nations and the Soviet Union permitted the deployment of U.S. Army military observers within a 100-mile (161-km) radius of the center of Berlin, for the twofold reason of maintaining the Quadripartite Treaty (i.e. bans on specific weapon types) and the purpose of 'Showing the Flag'. This was to ensure the East German citizens that the American forces were still present within Berlin. This was a key-component, like Armed Forces Network, to the Cold War Propaganda Battle.

The Flag Tours also played a critical human and imagery intelligence-gathering role. U.S. Military intelligence units within Berlin, such as Brigade G-2 and 766 MID, augmented Flag Tour personnel during specific 'high-value' Intelligence-gathering events, such as named training exercises or the May Day Parade. Observers were able to gather candid photos of vehicle interiors, equipment and observe the general morale of East German & Soviet soldiers. Teams were equipped with high-performance Ford Merkur Scorpio sedans, which were capable of easily evading the East German & Soviet military police driving Ladas, Volgas and Wartburgs. Intelligence analysts were equipped with secure communications and cameras (often using East German Zeiss Ikon lenses) for recording vehicles, tactics and persons of interest. Photos were developed within DCSI's photolab and further analyzed by 766MID imagery analysts.

This information was shared to West German, French & British Allies; however, some information was not, such as classified Soviet weapon systems, the key-information on the 2K22 Tunguska debut in East Germany in 1989. The U.S. Army also maintained propeller-driven aircraft, stationed at Tempelhof Airport, to conduct aerial observation of the forces within the 100-mile radius surrounding the city. During these flights, it became a tradition that the East German and Soviet forces would use the opportunity to conduct air defense training. The missions persisted throughout the Cold War period and ended in 1990, just prior to German reunification.

Post Soviet collapse, Flag Tour members would often be approached by hungry Russian soldiers, who would willingly trade military equipment, such as night-vision goggles, pistols, sniper rifles, assault rifles and 9K34 Strela-3 portable anti-aircraft missiles for food.

== Desert Storm ==
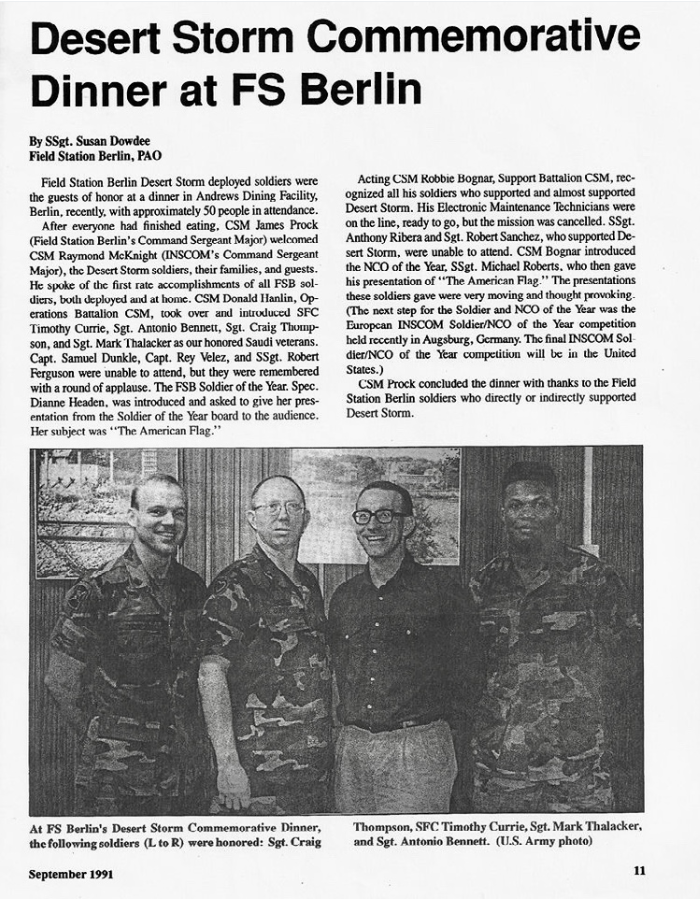
Field Station Berlin Soldiers who deployed to support "Desert Storm"

Individual members of the brigade with Intelligence specialties from 766th Military Intelligence Detachment & Field Station Berlin, deployed to Operations Desert Shield and Desert Storm in 1990–1991, filling shortfalls for other units in USAREUR. Members of the 42nd Engineer deployed as truck drivers for trucks donated from other countries to support force transportation requirements. Other soldiers from throughout the brigade also applied for transfer and back-filled several USAREUR units deploying to Saudi Arabia.

With the end of the Cold War and the drawdown of forces in Western Europe, the brigade began a drawdown in late 1990, with the inactivation of 4th Battalion, 502nd Infantry Regiment. In early 1991, elements of the Combat Support Battalion were inactivated, such as the 43rd Chemical Detachment and personnel consolidated. Echo Battery/320th Field Artillery swapped its M-109A3 (155 mm) self-propelled guns for M-102 (105 mm) howitzers. The intent was to make the brigade lighter and easier to respond to a spectrum of operations. In the spring of 1992, the M-1 Abrams tanks of 6th Battalion, 40th Armor, were rail headed out of Berlin, and the battalion inactivated; thus Turner Barracks ceased functions and remained so until it was demolished in the late 1990s, being replaced by an apartment complex.

The first Berlin Brigade units to take part in an out-of-theater operation were the command-and-staff element of Headquarters and Headquarters Company (HHC), as well as Company B, 6th Battalion, 502nd Infantry and the 42d Engineer Company. These units were later joined by the members of the 42d AG Unit (Postal). These units served in Operation Provide Comfort II, a relief and protection mission for Iraqi Kurds. They served with a multinational "Allied Ground Combat Force" that also included British, French, Italian, Dutch, and Turkish infantry companies. Based in Silopi, Turkey, near the Iraqi border, from July to October 1991, these ground forces were soon withdrawn to avoid entanglement in the local Turkish-PKK conflict and because it was decided that the US Air Force presence at Incirlik constituted an adequate deterrent to Iraqi attempts at encroaching on the Kurdish autonomous zone. Soldiers of this task force were authorized to wear the Berlin Brigade shoulder sleeve insignia as a combat patch on the right shoulder of their uniform, the first and only time elements of the Berlin Brigade were authorized to do so.

Elements of the Berlin Brigade were the first combat units selected to deploy as a member of the United Nations Protectionary Forces (UNPROFOR) to Macedonia in July 1993; later to be renamed Task Force Able Sentry.

The Brigade was awarded the Superior Unit Award for the period of 30 September 1993–15 May 1994, under General Order 1994-27.

Under the treaties that enabled the reunification of Germany, all non-German military forces were required to leave Berlin. The Berlin Brigade was officially inactivated by President Bill Clinton on 6 July 1994. The last unit to leave Berlin was the 42nd AG Unit (Postal). The 42nd was a small unit responsible for the mail service for the military assigned to Berlin, the Potsdam unit, and the Helmstedt detachment. It received very little recognition but was vital to the morale of the brigade. Besides postal service, the unit also performed other services, such as courier duty throughout the European theater. The unit was based at Andrews Barracks under Special Troops.

== Historical notes ==
The 287th Military Police Company was the only US Army MP unit to use boats for water patrol along the border to East Germany.

The Berlin Brigade Aviation Detachment at Tempelhof Central Airport was the last US Army unit worldwide to use the DeHavilland Canada U-6 Beaver, when retired in January 1980. Its replacement was the UV-20A Chiricahua (two delivered in 1979), for which the unit was also the first and, until 1991, the only operator within the US Army.

The Rail Transportation Office operated the only regular US Army Transportation Corps trains (between West Berlin and mainland West Germany) through a Communist-controlled country for 45 years, pulled by East German Deutsche Reichsbahn locomotives.

== See also ==
- Forces Françaises à Berlin
- Berlin Infantry Brigade
- 6th Separate Guards Motor Rifle Brigade (USSR)

== Bibliography ==
- William Durie, "The United States Garrison Berlin 1945-1994", Aug 2014, ISBN 978-1630685409.
- AMTLICH GEWONNEN; considering the spirit during the Berlin Wall period, including a dedication to the former personnel of 7350th Air Base Group, Großek, Michael (2012) ISBN 978-3-89950-993-9
- Kevin Wright and Peter Jefferies "Looking down the corridors-Allied aerial espionage over East Germany and Berlin 1945-1990",2015, ISBN 978-0-7509-7947-4.
- Earl F. Ziemke, THE U.S. ARMY IN THE OCCUPATION OF GERMANY 1944-1946, CENTER OF MILITARY HISTORY, UNITED STATES ARMY, WASHINGTON, D.C., 1990. Library of Congress Catalog Card Number 75-619027. First Printed 1975-CMH Pub 30-6. For sale by the Superintendent of Documents, US Government Printing Office Washington, D.C. 20402
