= Gross-Lichterfelde Tramway =

First electric tramway, Berlin (1881-1931)

Coordinates: 52°25′40″N 13°19′32″E

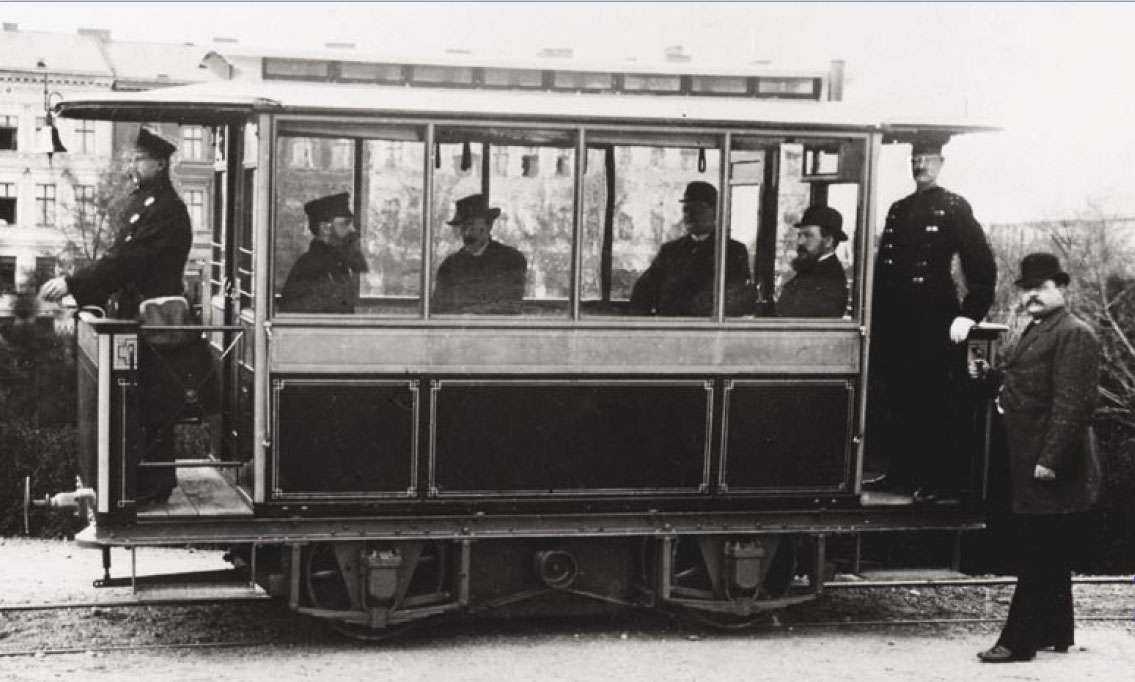
Lichterfelde tram, 1882

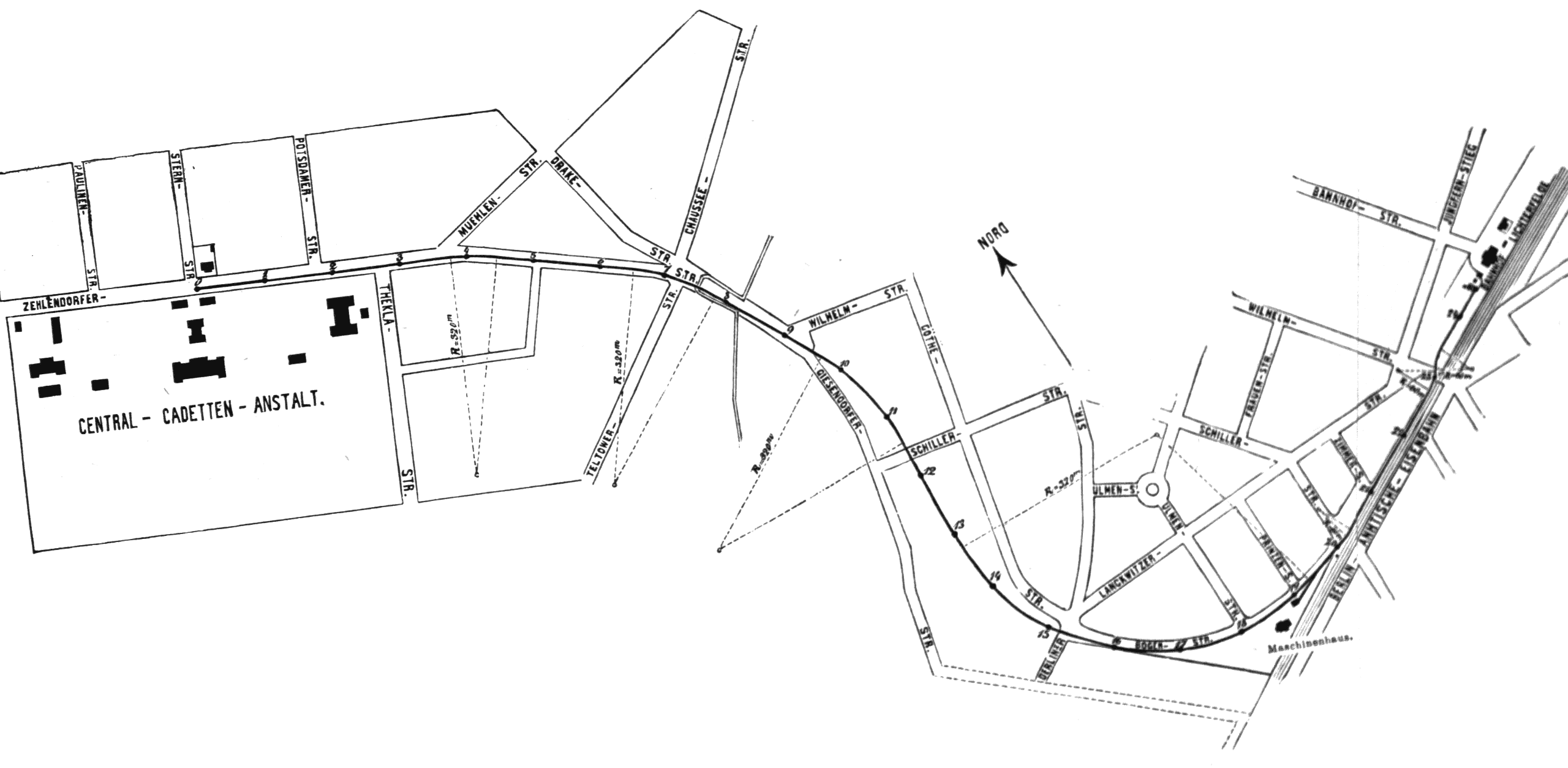
Track map

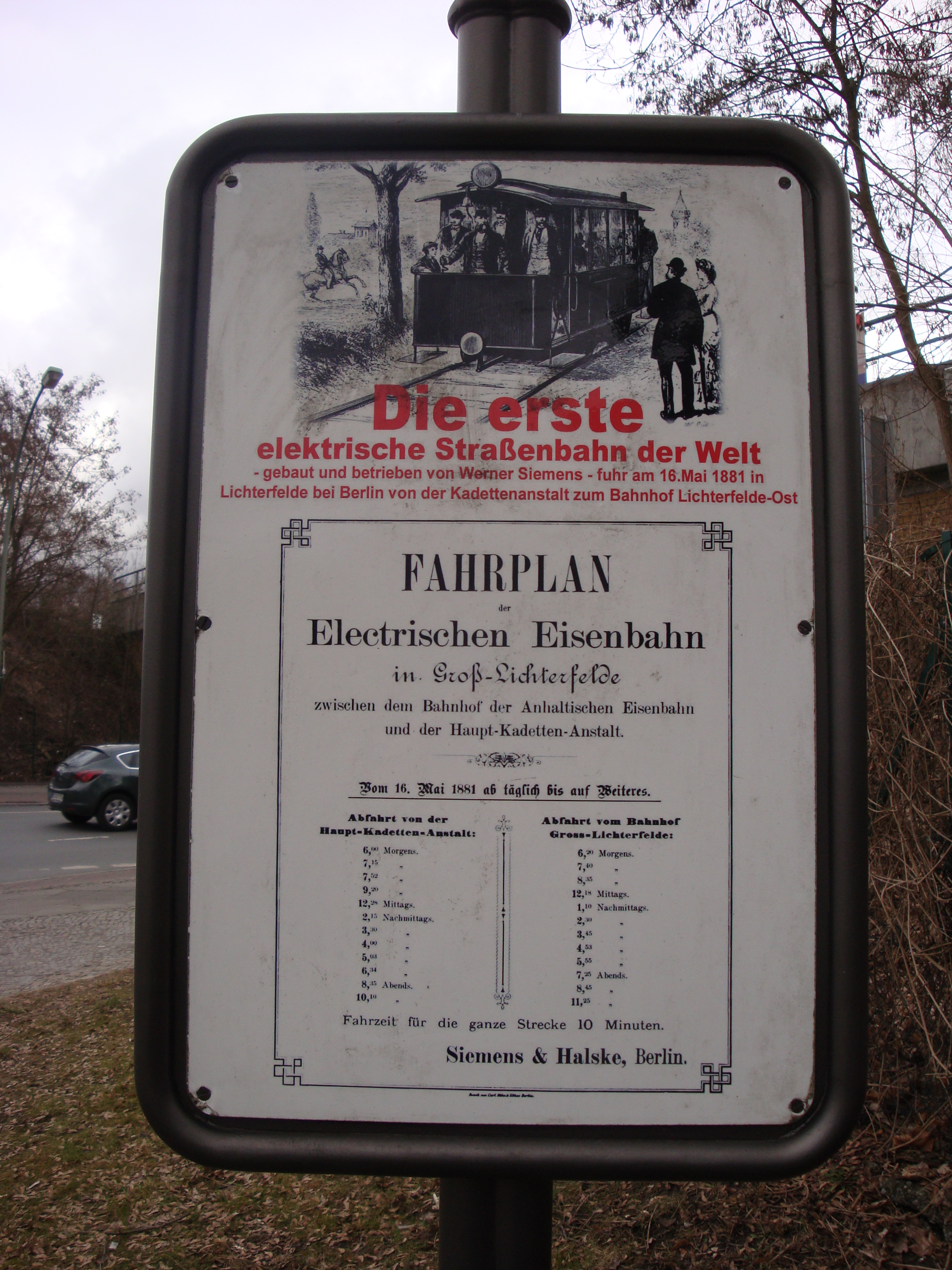
A photo of a plaque raised in Lichterfelde, Berlin, Germany, to mark the world's first electric streetcar line. The plaque is located on a stand near the Lichterfede Ost Railway Station in Berlin, Germany.

The Gross Lichterfelde Tramway was the world's first commercially successful electric tram and first public electric tramway used for permanent service. It was built by the Siemens & Halske company in Lichterfelde, a suburb of Berlin, and went in service on 16 May 1881. The world's first overhead wires were installed in 1883.

== Overview ==
Werner von Siemens had presented the first electric passenger train at the Berlin industrial exhibition two years before. In order to develop the concept, he received the official approval to run an electric tramway line on already existing tracks, which had been used for building the Prussian military academy (Hauptkadettenanstalt) at Lichterfelde West.

The 2.4-kilometre-long (1.5 mi) line started at Berlin-Lichterfelde Ost station on the Anhalt Railway line. Each car was originally equipped with a 180-volt DC 4 kW (5.4 hp) traction motor, the current being supplied via the running rails, in a manner similar to that used by most present-day model railways. Therefore the 1,000 mm (3 ft 3 3/8 in) metre gauge tracks were generally separated from roads, and trespassing was prohibited.

At level crossings, the rails were dead or switched on only briefly before the approach of the tramcar. Nevertheless, people and horses frequently received electric shocks. It is also believed that young people would put wire mesh on the tracks to make it glow for fun, which caused short circuits that shut down operation.

In 1891, the tramway was equipped with an overhead wire, and the line was extended to Berlin-Lichterfelde West station. There were several further extensions, but operation was discontinued in 1931.

== See also ==
- Trams in Berlin
- Electromote
