= Julius Posener =

German Jewish architect (1904–1996)

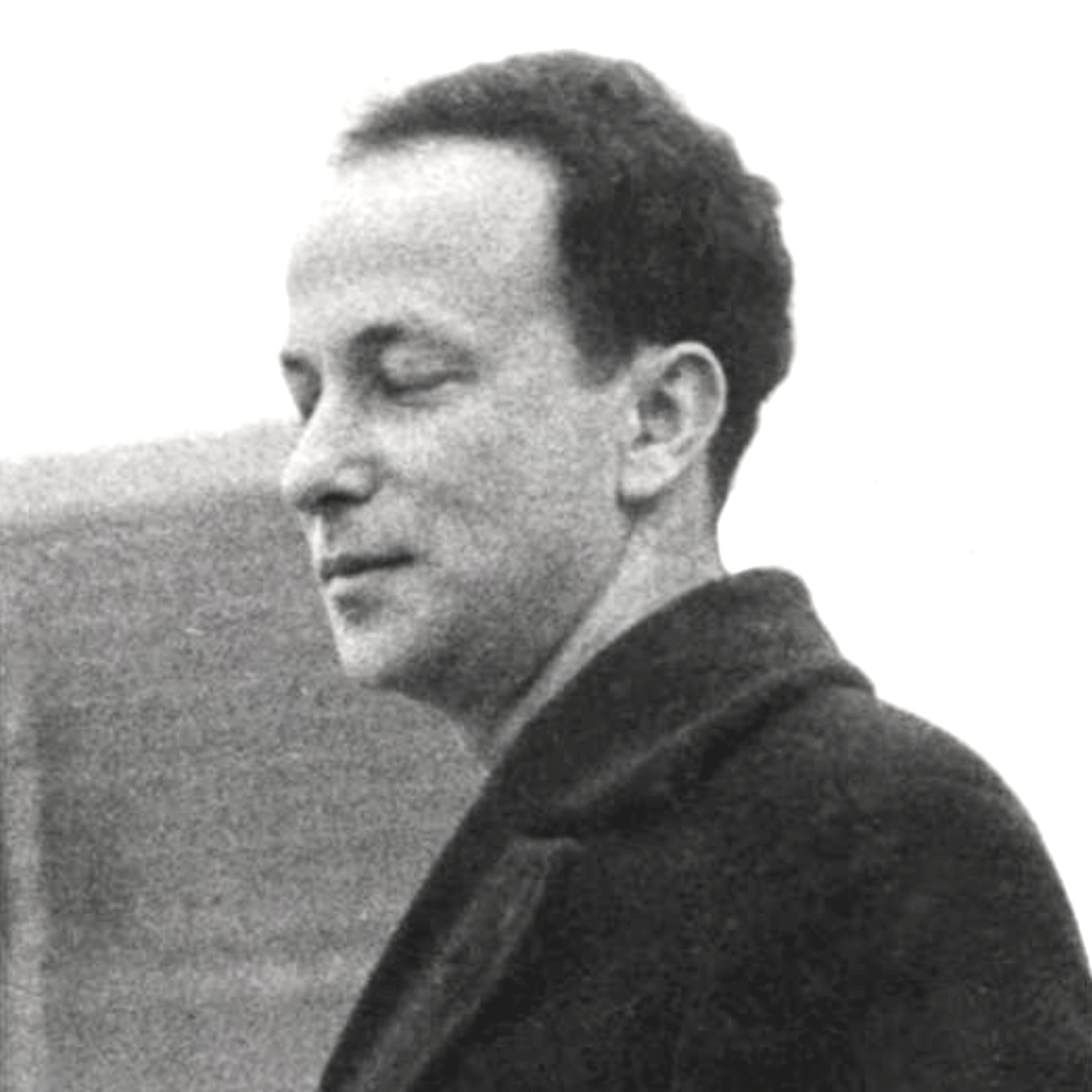
Image of Julius Posener

Julius Posener (4 November 1904, Lichterfelde – 29 January 1996, Berlin) was a German architectural historian, author and higher education teacher.

Coming from a bourgeois-Jewish background, son of the painter Moritz Posener and a daughter of the real estate developer Oppenheim, Julius Posener grew up in the middle-class environment in the architecturally stimulating Berlin villa colony Lichterfelde-West. His parents had built themselves a villa in the English country home style there as founders of progressive architecture. This environment had lastingly formed him from his own statement:

I lived in Germany, the best country that there is, the best villa suburb, in the best house with the most beautiful garden wide and far ... When I recited to myself in the evenings before going to bed, I was content with the world and loved God so gratefully.

— From the autobiography Heimliche Erinnerungen ("Secret Memories")

Posener's way of life and activity would be formed strongly through the break of the felt ideal and the succeeding Third Reich. He studied Architecture from 1923 to 1929, under among others Hans Poelzig, at the Technische Hochschule Berlin-Charlottenberg. After his studies, he was active among others in the office of Erich Mendelsohn in Berlin and lived temporarily also already in Paris. He fled there after the 1933 power struggle of the Nazis. Posener emigrated to Palestine in 1935, he registered voluntarily for the British Army and would be naturalized in 1946. After the war, he taught in London and in Kuala Lumpur from 1956. He followed the call for the teaching position for Building history at the Berlin Higher Education for Building Arts (modern Berlin University of the Arts) and taught there until 1971.

Julius Posener was chairman of the Deutscher Werkbund from 1973 to 1976, and an important mentor of the periodical ARCH+.

He died on January 29 1996 at the age of 91.

== Writings ==
- Anfänge des Funktionalismus. Von Arts and Crafts zum Deutschen Werkbund (Beginnings of Functionality. Of Arts and Crafts of the Deutscher Werkbund), 1964
- Der Architekt Arieh Sharon, Bauen und Wohnen, 12, 1969
- Hans Poelzig, 1970
- From Schinkel to the Bauhaus, 1972
- Berlin auf dem Weg zu einer neuen Architektur 1889–1918 (Berlin on the Way to a new Architecture 1889–1918), 1977
- Fast so alt wie das Jahrhundert. Eine Autobiographie als Epochengemälde. Vom späten Kaiserreich über die kurzen Jahre der Republik in die Zeit des wechselvollen Exils. Am Ende die Heimkehr in das neue Berlin (Almost as old as the Century. An Autobiography as a Painting of an Epoch. From the Late Empire over the Short Years of the Republic in the Time of the Eventful Exiles. At the End, the Homecoming in the New Berlin ), Siedler, Berlin 1990.
- In Deutschland 1945-1946, Berlin 2001
- Heimliche Erinnerungen. In Deutschland 1904-1933 (Secret Memories. In Germany 1904-1933), 2004
- Julius Posener Vorlesungen 1, Die moderne Architektur (1924-1933) (Lecture 1: The Modern Architecture 1924-1933) arch+ 48
- Julius Posener Vorlesungen 2, Die Architektur der Reform (1900-1924) (Lecture 2: The Architecture of the Reform 1900-1924) arch+ 53
- Julius Posener Vorlesungen 3, Das Zeitalter Wilhelms II. (Lecture 3: The age of William II.) arch+ 59
- Julius Posener Vorlesungen 4, Die sozialen und bautechnischen Entwicklungen im 19. Jahrhundert (Lecture 4: The Social and Building Innovations of the 19th Century) arch+ 63/64
- Julius Posener Vorlesungen 5, Neue Tendenzen im 18. Jahrhundert (Lecture 5: New Tendencies in the 18th Century) arch+ 69/70

== Literature ==
- Matthias Schirren, Sylvia Claus (Editor): Julius Posener. Ein Leben in Briefen. 1999 (Julius Posener. A Life in Letters)
