= United States Army Berlin =

American military command

Shoulder Sleeve Insignia of U.S. Army Berlin

U.S. Army Berlin (USAB) was a command of the United States Army created in December 1961, at the height of the Berlin Wall crisis. USAB was a combined command with the Headquarters, U.S. Command Berlin (USCOB). This combined organization was sometimes called the "Berlin Command". USCOB/USAB was a separate command from the U.S. Army Europe (USAREUR) which had previously been in command of American troops in West Berlin.

The major general who commanded this organization held the title of "Commandant; U.S. Commander Berlin; Commander, U.S. Army Berlin". A brigadier general served as the "Commander, Berlin Brigade (Infantry); Deputy Commander, U.S. Army Berlin and Community Commander".

The shoulder sleeve insignia adopted by USAB was the same as the patch used by the Berlin Brigade – the USAREUR patch with a Berlin tab. By the mid-1960s, the Berlin tab was incorporated into the patch.

Its headquarters were located at the Clay Headquarters Compound on Clayallee in Berlin's Zehlendorf district.

== Units locations ==
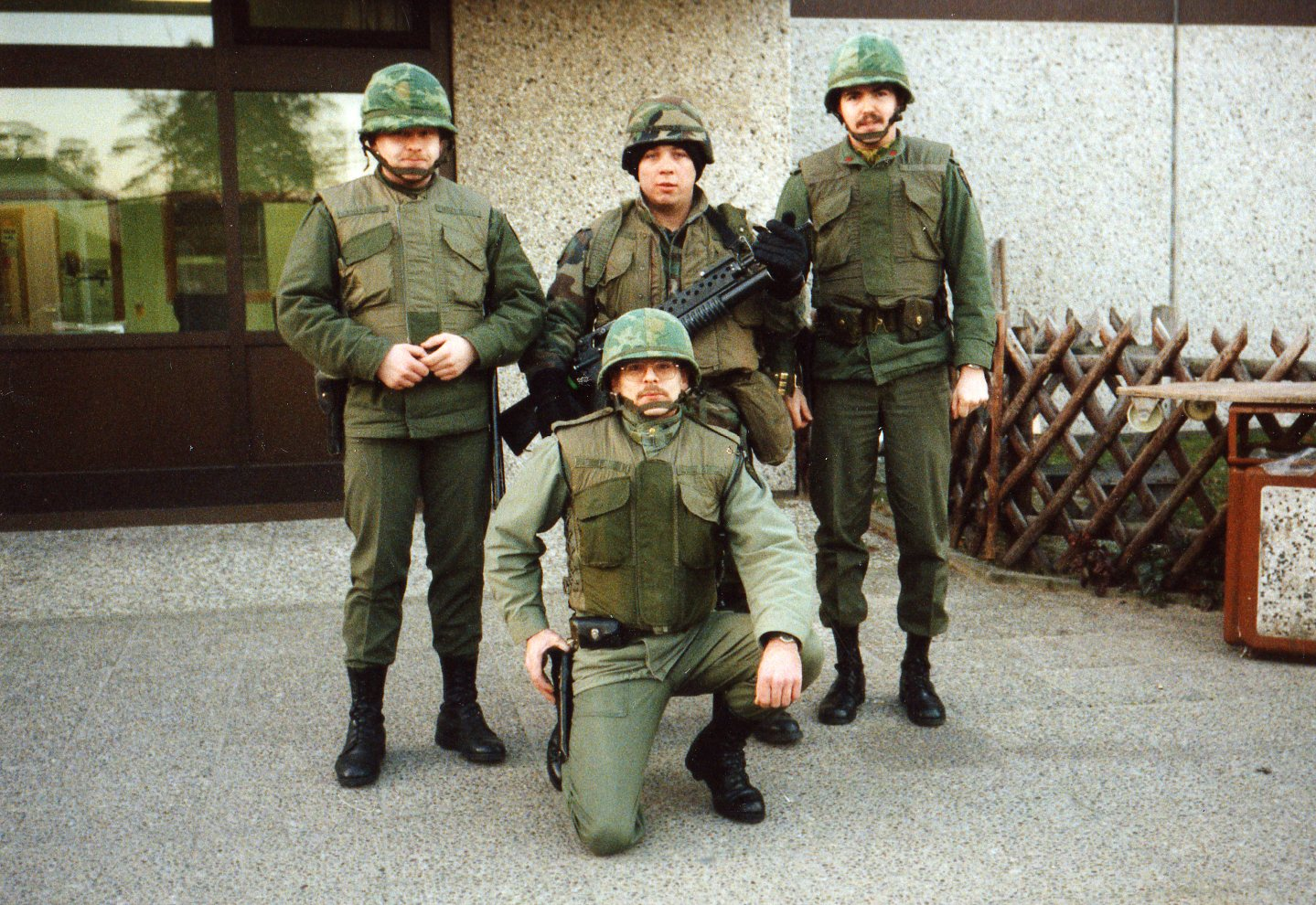
Military of 6941st Guard Battalion, Truman Plaza.

Units under the command of USAB included the Berlin Brigade, the Medical and Dental Activities, Tempelhof Central Airport (United States Air Force base), Armed Forces Network (radio and television affiliate AFN Berlin), the U.S. Military Liaison Mission and the United States Army Field Station Berlin.

Troops assigned to USAB were housed at several kasernes (German: Kasernen, "barracks complexes") in Zehlendorf and Steglitz, including Andrews Barracks, McNair Barracks and Turner Barracks. Families lived in the housing areas near the Clay Compound, and in the Düppel, Dahlem and Lichterfelde neighborhoods. Truman Plaza, located across Clayallee from the Clay Headquarters Compound, held: the post exchange, commissary, Army Post Office (APO), American Express bank, Stars & Stripes book store, barber, florist, Deutsche Bundespost and the Major Arthur D. Nicholson Memorial Library. Schools for the children of service members, Thomas A. Roberts Berlin American Elementary School (TAR) and Berlin-American High School (BAHS), were located close to Truman Plaza.

== History ==
After the reunification of Germany on 3 October 1990, the presence of U.S. military forces in Berlin was no longer necessary, but was retained (along with the British and French forces), until the Russian military withdrew from eastern Germany. USAB was inactivated on 12 July 1994 with President Bill Clinton participating in the casing of the colors ceremony. Since then, USAB housing areas, schools and the Army Hospital have reverted to civilian use, some for German citizens and others being taken over by the U.S. Embassy. Truman Plaza was razed in 1996, in anticipation of new housing for employees of the German federal government relocating from the former capital Bonn, which began in 2009/2010. Across the street from Truman Plaza was the Berlin Brigade headquarters, part of which serves as an annex of the Embassy of the United States in Berlin. The nearby library and adjoining Outpost Theater have been converted into the Allied Museum, which documents the American, British and French presence in Berlin during the Cold War.

== Troop units assigned to USCOB/USAB ==
Command organization in the late 1980s –

- Headquarters, Berlin Brigade
  - 4th Battalion, 502nd Infantry
  - 5th Battalion, 502nd Infantry
  - 6th Battalion, 502nd Infantry
- Combat Support Battalion
  - Headquarters & Service Company
  - A Company (Provisional)
  - C Battery 94th Artillery (redesignated E Bty, 320th FAR in 1986)
  - 43rd Chemical Detachment
  - 42nd Postal Branch (Note: The 42nd Postal Branch had the distinction of being the very last unit to be withdrawn from Berlin.)
  - 42nd Engineer Company (Note: The 42nd Engineer Company (now known as 42nd Clearance Company) was reactivated on 12 May 2010 A.D. at Warner Barracks, in the German city of Bamberg, under the 18th Engineer Brigade. On 31 July 2013, the 42nd cased its colors in Bamberg and uncased its colors on 14 November 2013 at Ft. Knox, Kentucky.)
  - E-320th Field Artillery Battery
  - Company "F", 40th Armor Regiment
  - Helmstedt Support Detachment
- US Military Community Activity (USMCA)
  - 298th Army Band (Note: It has the distinction of being the longest continuously assigned units in Berlin. Both units arrived to Berlin in a 37-vehicle convoy, on 2 July 1945. The commanders of both units were high school buddies. Dr. Merle Farris, first commander of the 168th Med Det (VS), and his wife, Myrna, attended the joint MEDDAC, DENTAC, 168th MED DET(VS) deactivation ceremony on 10 May 1994. 4. February 2008, the 287th MP was reactivated under the 97th MP Battalion at Fort Riley, Kansas. In September 2024 the 97th MP Bn inactivated along with three companies, which included the 287th.)
  - Signal Support Company
  - 287th Military Police Company
- Aviation Detachment
- 6941st Guard Battalion Labor Service
- U.S. Army Field Station Berlin
- U.S. Military Liaison Mission to the Commander-in-Chief, Group of Soviet Forces in Germany
- United States Army Europe Technical Intelligence Center, Field Team #3 w/duty station Berlin (UTIC Fld TM #3)
- Joint Allied Refugee Operations Center (J-ROC)
- Allied Control Authority
- Allied Kommandatura
- Berlin MEDDAC
- Berlin DENTAC
- 168th Medical Detachment (Veterinary Services)
- Tempelhof Central Airport
- 766th MI Det, 66th MI Grp, Intel & Scrty
- Naval Advisor
- U.S. Army Special Security Det (Berlin)
- U.S. Army EOD detachment
- U.S. Army Physical Security Support Element - Berlin
