= McNair Barracks =

US Army installation in Lichterfelde, Germany

Coordinates: 52°25′14.2″N 13°17′1.7″E

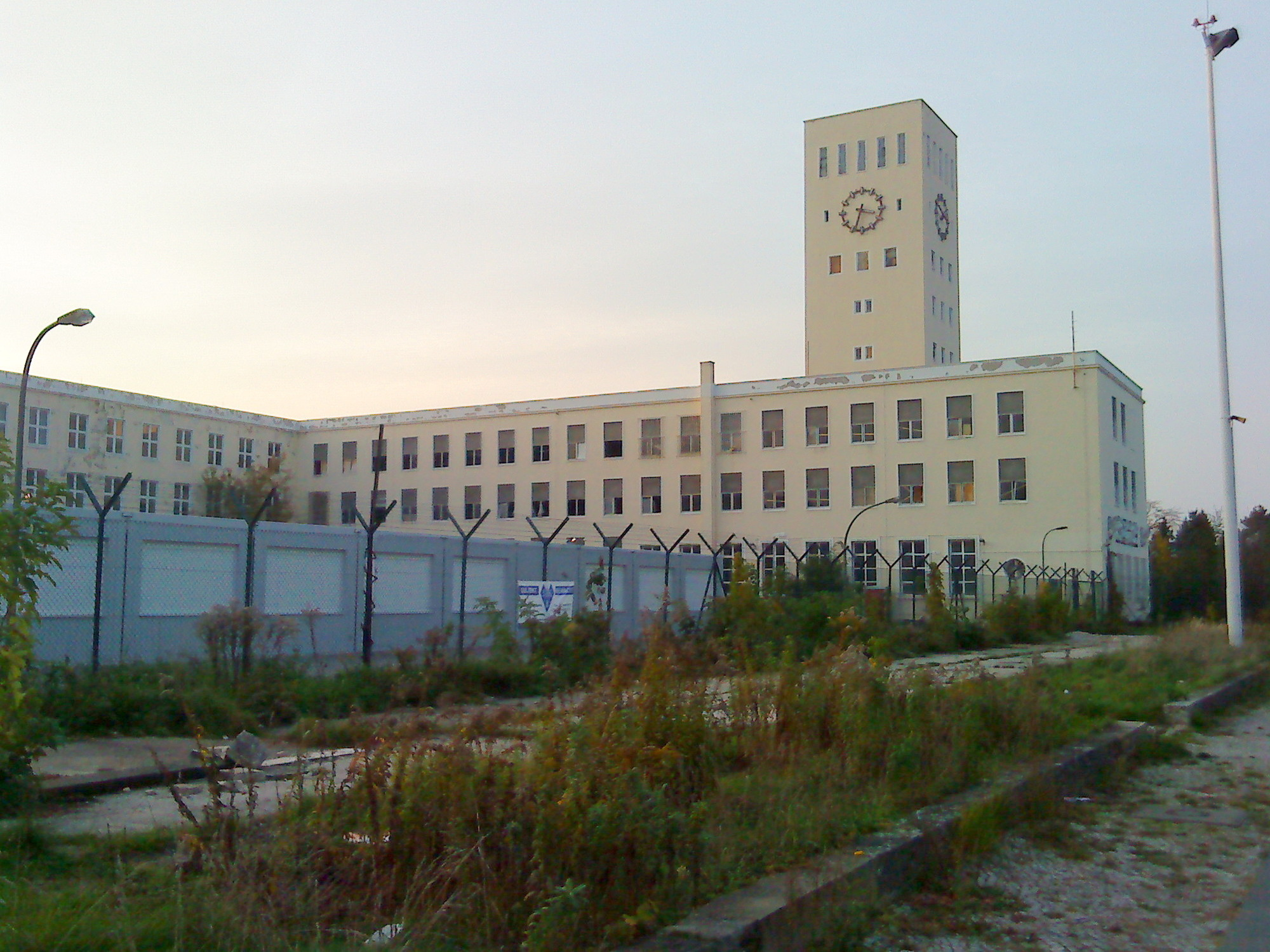
The McNair Barracks in Berlin Lichterfelde, October 2008

The McNair Barracks was a US Army installation in Lichterfelde, a locality in southwest Berlin, Germany. The barracks were named after Lieutenant General Lesley J. McNair, an American Army officer who served in World War I and World War II and was killed in an infamous friendly fire incident on 25 July 1944 in the Battle of Normandy. The barracks housed the Infantry and Artillery units of the U.S. Army Berlin Brigade.

== History ==
Built in the 1930s, the structure originally housed the Telefunken headquarters and factory, until 1941 a joint venture of Siemens & Halske (S & H) and Allgemeine Elektricitäts-Gesellschaft. During the years of National Socialism, the buildings were mainly used for development and production of military equipment, and the radar-guided flak system was perfected there. In 1945 the Telefunken plant was converted into barracks for occupation soldiers, for which the German government paid the owners of the site a yearly rent for its use as an army barracks.

== Use as barracks ==
The US Army maintained four large military installations in Steglitz-Zehlendorf, Berlin: McNair, Andrews, Roosevelt and Turner. Members of the Berlin Brigade were stationed there from 1945 until 1994, including more than 100,000 male and female GIs. In addition to three infantry battalions, these installations accommodated several other smaller units, such as an Artillery Battery, motor pools, stockade, snack bar, theater, a church and a few other places. Many veterans from the Berlin Brigade view the McNair Barracks as the “nicest barracks” with spacious living quarters and public spaces.

In addition to housing for soldiers, the McNair Barracks had a church, barber shop, movie theater, service club, and a restaurant for soldiers' use. The barracks' mess hall walls had murals depicting military scenes and regimental insignia. American soldiers remembered eating at tables which the civilian waitresses had decorated with flowers. A former veteran of the Berlin Brigade commented that it as one of the "nicest" mess halls; "there were white walls and painted on them were the most beautiful murals I ever saw."

=== Closure ===
In the early 1990s, the Berlin Command “drew down” its presence in the city. Over the succeeding four years, elements of the Berlin Brigade were either reassigned or deactivated. In the four years between the inactivation of the air group at Berlin Tempelhof Airport and fall 1994, 31 installations were closed, including the Andrews and McNair barracks, the American military hospital, and the General Lucius D. Clay Headquarters. The 27th "annual" Allied Forces Day Parade, held on 18 June 1994, which had been suspended in 1989, was reinstated for the occasion. That was the last parade of the "protecting powers"—France, the United States, and Great Britain—as the Berliners had called them.

On 12 July 1994, United States President Bill Clinton visited Berlin; after a speech at the Brandenburg Gate he attended a ceremony at the Barracks, where the 4,000 troops of the Berlin Brigade paraded and the Color Guard furled the Brigade colors, prior to closing the installation.

== Repurposing ==
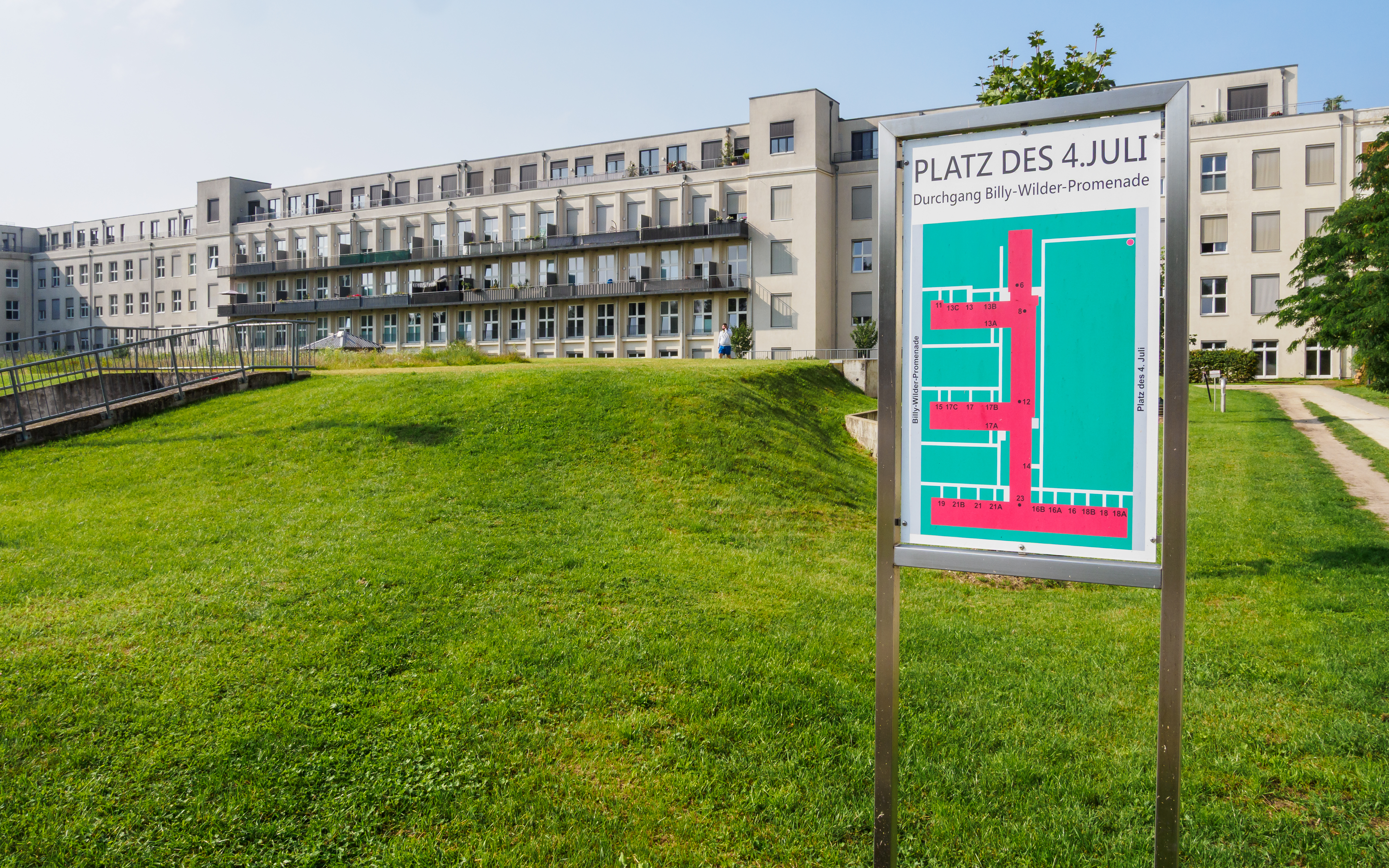
Platz des 4. Juli (in 2025)

Beginning in 2015, the barracks were being converted into upscale apartments, designed by the Berlin architects firm Tchoban, for eventual sale by S+P Real Estate GmbH, and named after the American movie actress Marilyn Monroe. Upscale flats will range in size from 60 to 260 square meters in size, with designer kitchens, parquet floors, and other quality features. A portion of the complex has been converted into a shopping mall. An additional floor was added to the original buildings.

Another section of the McNair Barracks has been converted into a museum, featuring soldiers' uniforms and signs from the borders of the different sectors of divided Berlin. The museum which was privately operated closed up approximately in 2007-2008 and items stored. Reunions for American veterans who served in Berlin are held every 4 July at the McNair Barracks.

== Legacy ==
From telecommunications factory to testing center to barracks to condominiums, the building has seen many uses. Within the context of Germany's 20th century, of all the buildings in Berlin, possibly this one reflects Berlin's many identities, the longest one being the western European city surrounded by the Eastern bloc, and occupied by foreign armies. The men and women who lived there were entitled to the Army of Occupation Medal with Germany clasp; technically, Berlin had remained occupied territory. (See Berlin Brigade.)

== See also ==
- Forces Françaises à Berlin
- British Army of the Rhine

== Bibliography ==
- Berlin Brigade official website, accessed 14 August 2009. here
- From McNair to Monroe: a US Army barracks in Berlin is being converted. expatica.com 29 Nov 2006. Accessed 15 Apr 2008. here
- July 4 Reunions. Accessed 12 August 2009. here.
- Grathwol, Robert P.; et al. (1999). Berlin and the American Military: A Cold War Chronicle. New York: New York University Press. ISBN 0-8147-3133-3.
- Berlin Barracks murals. Accessed 14 August 2009. paintings can be seen here.
- McNair-Barracks, Berlin-Brigade, McNair Barracks floor plan
- The Story of Berlin Brigade, Pamphlet 870-2, US Command, Berlin and US Army, Berlin, 1981.
