= Lichterfelde West =

- Neighborhood of Berlin
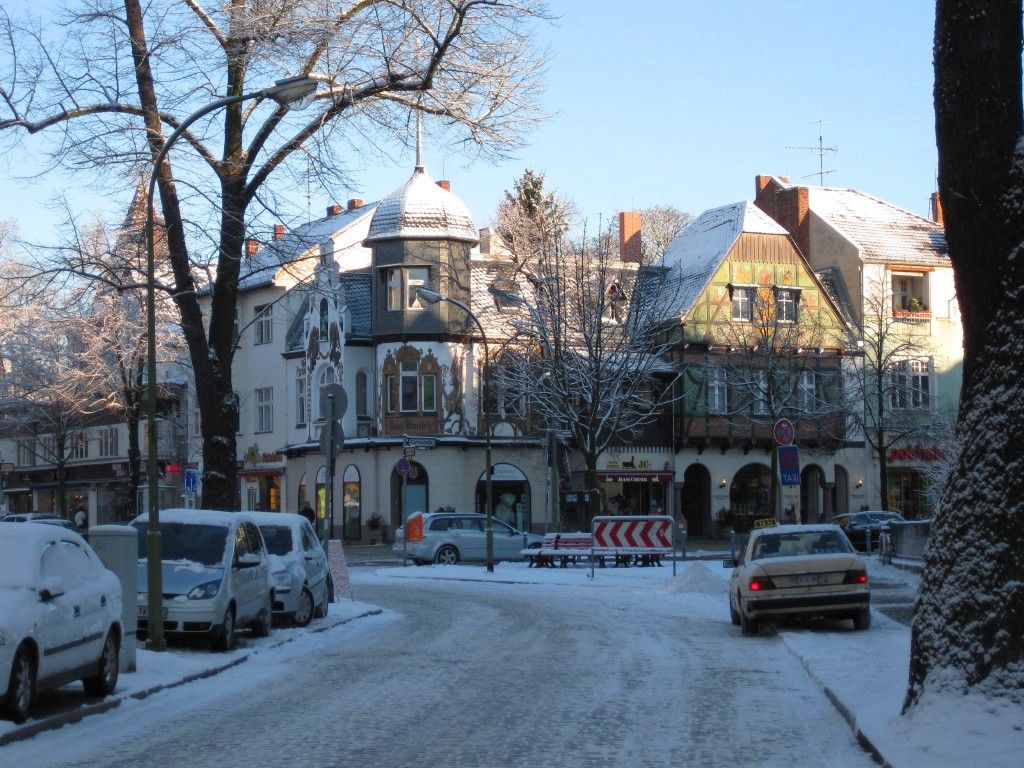
- Historic center of Lichterfelde West

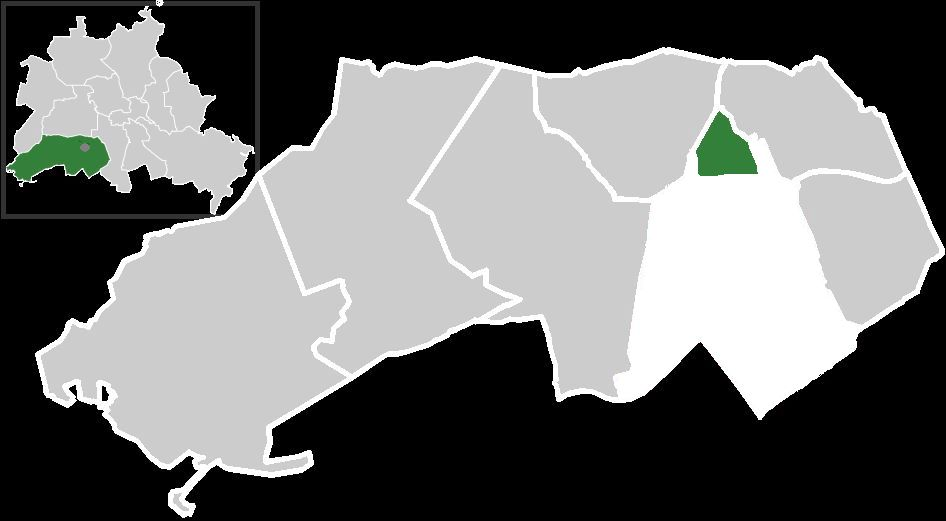
- Location of Lichterfelde West in Steglitz-Zehlendorf and Berlin
- Interactive map of Lichterfelde West
- Location within Germany Location within Berlin
- Coordinates: 52°26′09″N 13°17′43″E
- Country: Germany
- State: Berlin
- City: Berlin
- Borough: Steglitz-Zehlendorf
- Time zone: UTC+01:00 (CET)
  - Summer (DST): UTC+02:00 (CEST)
- Postal codes: 12203, 12205, 14167

Lichterfelde West is part of Lichterfelde in the Steglitz-Zehlendorf borough of Berlin. It is known for its historic mansions, tree-lined streets and green squares.

Next to Dahlem and Grunewald, Lichterfelde West is one of the German capital's wealthiest and most sought-after residential areas. Since the German government's move to Berlin in 2000, it has seen the highest rises in real-estate prices of any area in former West-Berlin. Today, many mansions in Lichterfelde West are used by diplomats for representative purposes.

Lichterfelde West is home to the Berlin Botanical Garden and Museum, the Schlosspark Lichterfelde manor and park, as well as the Charité university hospital's Benjamin Franklin Campus. The former Prussian Main Cadet School is home to the German Federal Archives, while the German Federal Intelligence Service (BND) operates from a historic building in Lichterfelde West. A new "Business and Innovation Center" of nearby Free University of Berlin is being developed close to the Botanical Garden.

== Mansions of Lichterfelde West (Villenkolonie Lichterfelde) ==
Lichterfelde West is best known for the 19th-century Villenkolonie Lichterfelde, which was developed from 1860 to 1900 by the wealthy businessman Johann von Carstenn and is a remarkable example of 19th-century Villenkolonie, a German concept of settlements completely made up of mansion houses or villas. While some houses were destroyed in World War II, Lichterfelde West has kept its 19th-century charm and boasts a large assortment of villas in an often extravagant mix of architectural styles. The architect Gustav Lilienthal built a number of Tudor-Revival style homes in Lichterfelde West, also known as "Carstenn-Castles".

It still features its original tree-lined and cobbled streets, small squares and working gas lights. The Prussian Main Cadet School, which contributed to Lichterfelde West's reputation of being home to many German aristocrats, was disbanded in 1920 by the Treaty of Versailles.

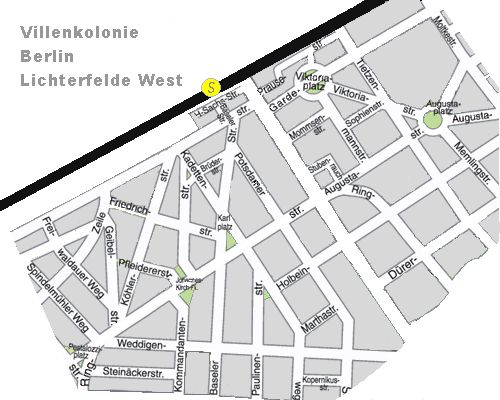
Map of the mansion colony

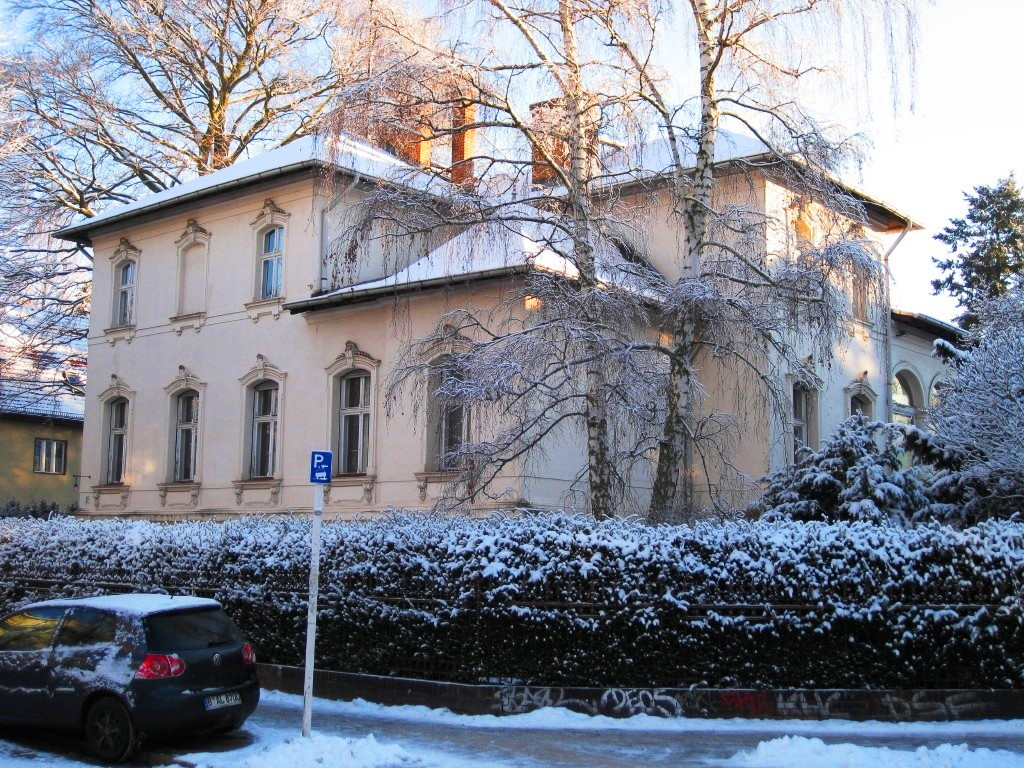
Villa on Baseler Straße

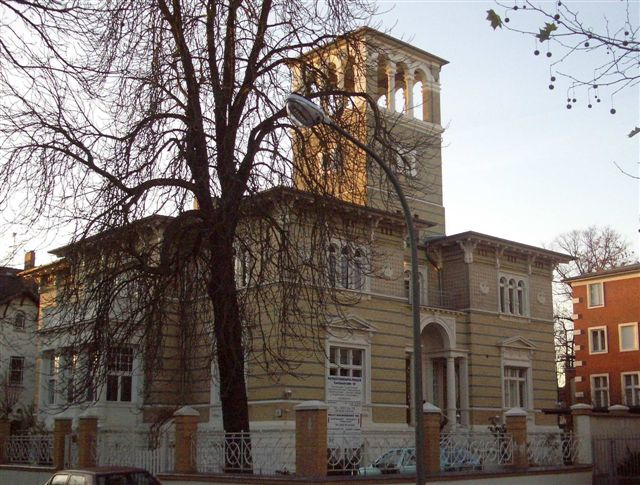
Villa on Curtiusstraße

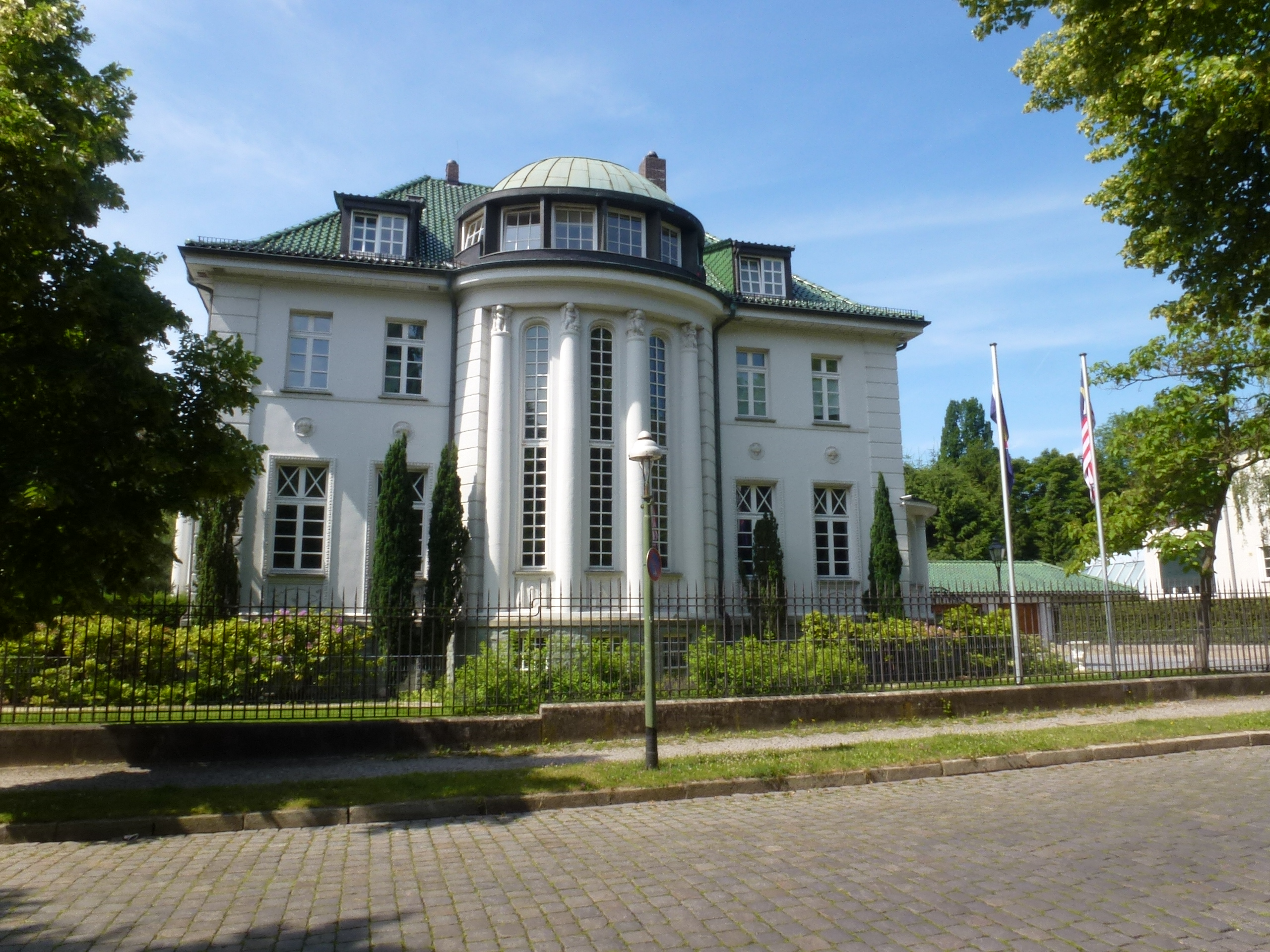
Villa on Willdenowstraße

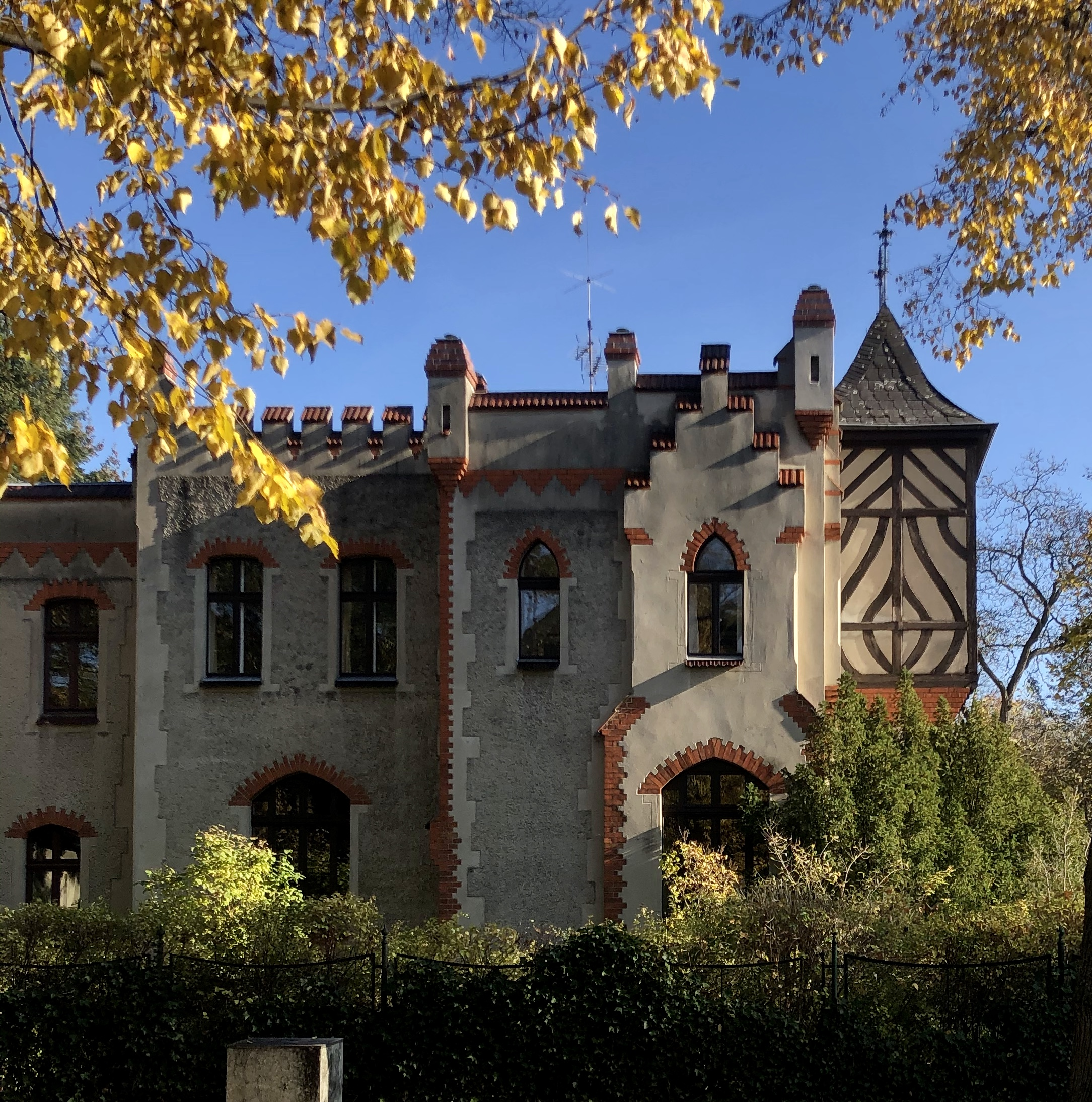
Villa on Paulinenstraße

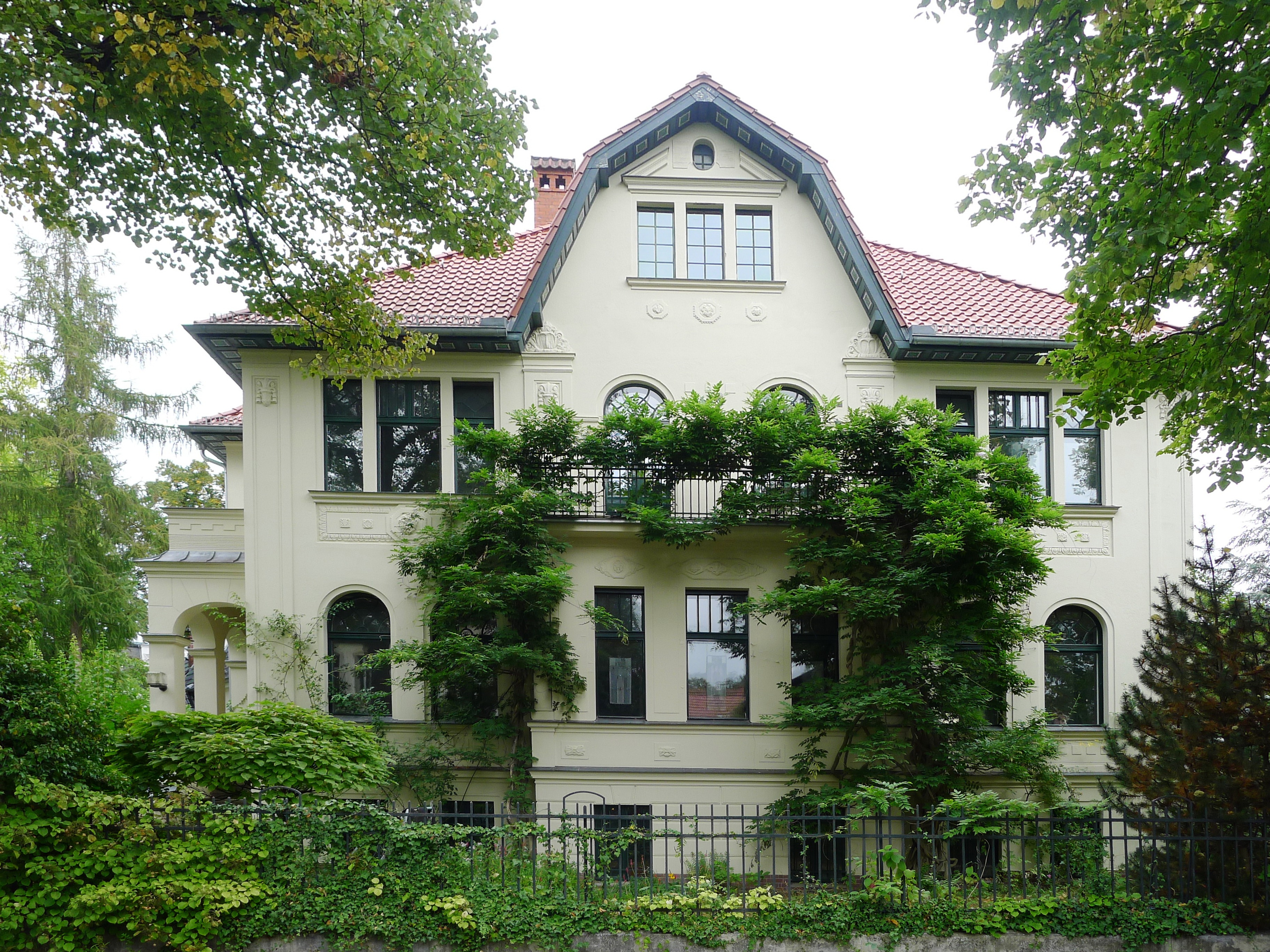
Villa on Kommandantenstraße

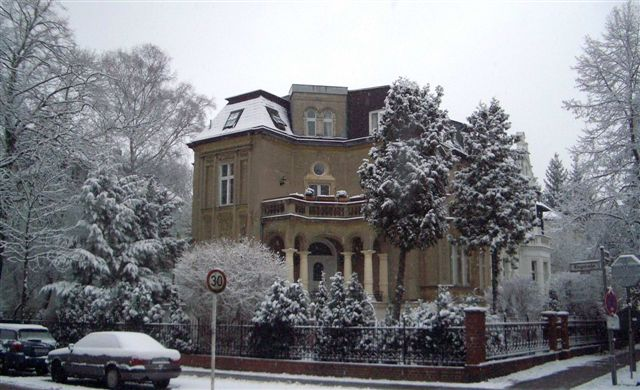
Villa on Kadettenweg

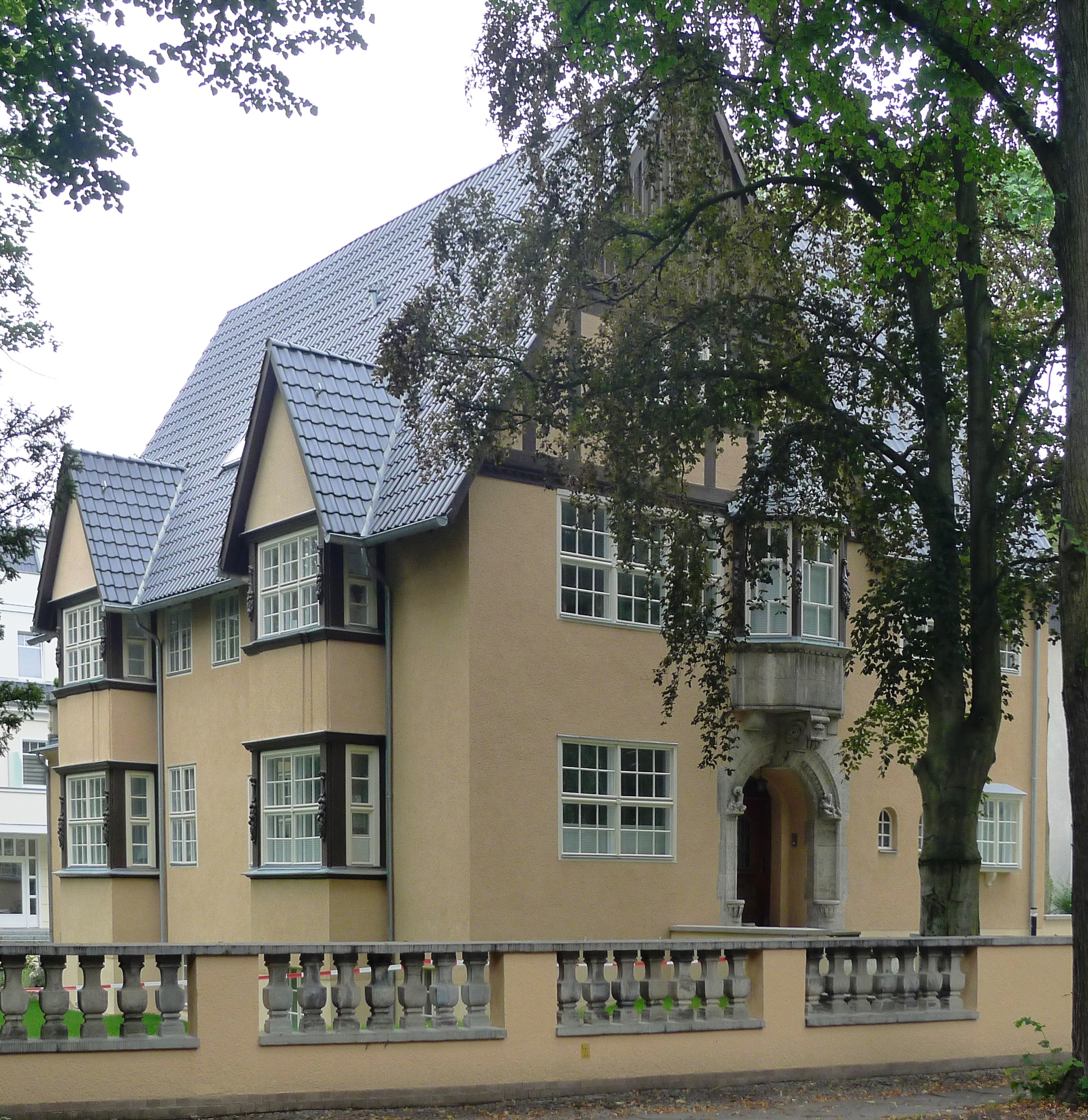
Villa on Ringstraße

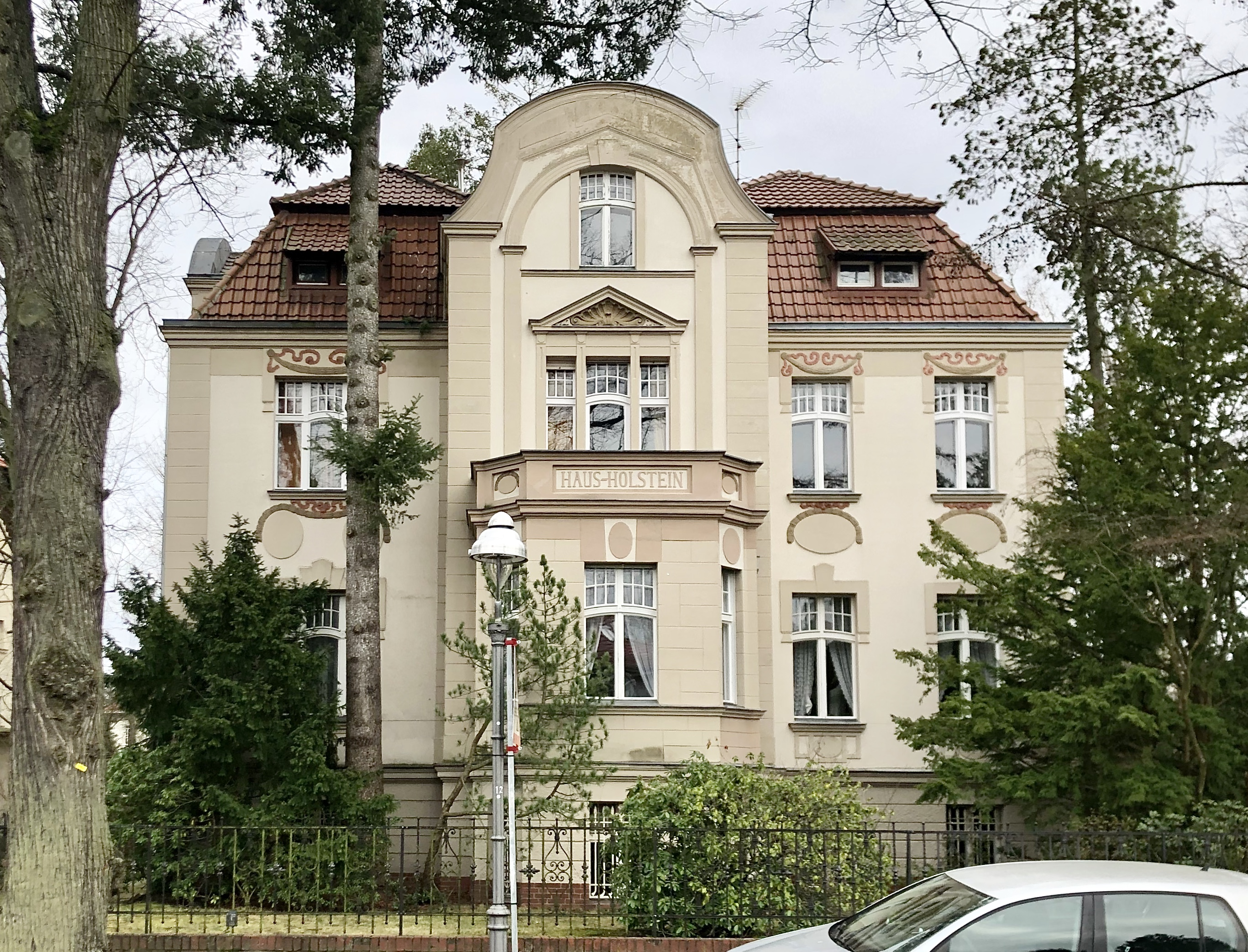
Villa on Kommandantenstraße

== Swiss Quarter ==
Development continued after completion of the mansion colony and more residential buildings were built until the 1930s. At the time, many streets were named after Swiss places and personalities, thus leading to this area of Lichterfelde West to getting referred to as "Schweizer Viertel" (en.: Swiss Quarter). After the fall of the Berlin wall, areas formerly occupied by U.S. Armed Forces were developed into townhouses or converted into loft-style apartments. In 2008, the private, bilingual (English and German) Phorms School opened in the Swiss Quarter of Lichterfelde West.

== Transportation ==
Lichterfelde West is connected to the Berlin S-Bahn commuter rail network by its station on the S1 line. The rail station also serves nearby Free University in bordering Dahlem. From S Lichterfelde West, it takes around 15 minutes to both Berlin-Mitte and Wannsee. Additionally, various bus lines offer public transportation service to Steglitz, Zehlendorf, Dahlem, and Lichterfelde Ost.

== Walks ==
For a twenty-minute stroll leave Lichterfelde West train station direction South, cross Curtiusstrasse into Baselerstrasse. Follow until you reach Karlsplatz, turn left along the square, cross Ringstrasse into Kadettenweg. Follow Kadettenweg, and pass by the Cadet Corps memorial at Paulinenplatz until you reach Weddigenweg. Turn right, after two hundred yards turn right again into Paulinenstrasse for a short stop at the so-called "Carstenn Castles", small villas built in Tudor-castle style. Turn back and turn right again into Weddigenweg, across Baseler Strasse, until you reach Kommandanten Strasse. Turn right, follow Kommandanten Strasse (dir. North), cross Ringstrasse, still follow Kommandantenstrasse, pass by the "Rother Stift", a former retirement home for dowagers, until you reach Kadettenweg (North end). Follow Kadettenweg for a few hundred yards, turn right into Curtiustrasse, pass by the "Litehouse" restaurant and back to the train station.

== Places of interest ==
- Berlin Botanical Garden and Museum
- Lichterfelde Manor with park
- Parkfriedhof Lichterfelde (cemetery known for many notable having been buried here)
- German Federal Archives (located in former Prussian Main Cadet School)
- German Federal Intelligence Service (BND)
- Charité university hospital's Benjamin Franklin Campus
- German Federal Institute for Materials Research and Testing (BAM)

== Notable residents ==
- Hasso von Boehmer, lieutenant colonel and one of the 20 July Plotters
- Herbert von Bose, head of the press division of the Vice Chancellery under Franz von Papen and opponent of the Nazi regime
- Johann Albrecht von Bülow, General of the Infantry under Fredrick the Great
- Bushido, German rapper and producer
- Fritz Elsas, former mayor of Berlin and opponent of Nazi regime
- Peter Fox, German singer and songwriter
- Otto Hahn, OBE, German chemist and pioneer in the fields of radioactivity and radiochemistry
- Theodor Heuss, former president of West Germany
- Günther Jauch, German television host and producer
- Nils Seethaler, cultural anthropologist
- Adolf Wehrmut, former mayor of Berlin
- Arthur Werner, former mayor of Berlin
- Josef Wirmer, German jurist and opponent of the Nazi regime
- Peter Yorck, count of Wartenburg, German jurist and opponent of the Nazi regime
