= Potsdam Medienstadt Babelsberg station =

Railway station in Potsdam, Germany

Potsdam Medienstadt Babelsberg
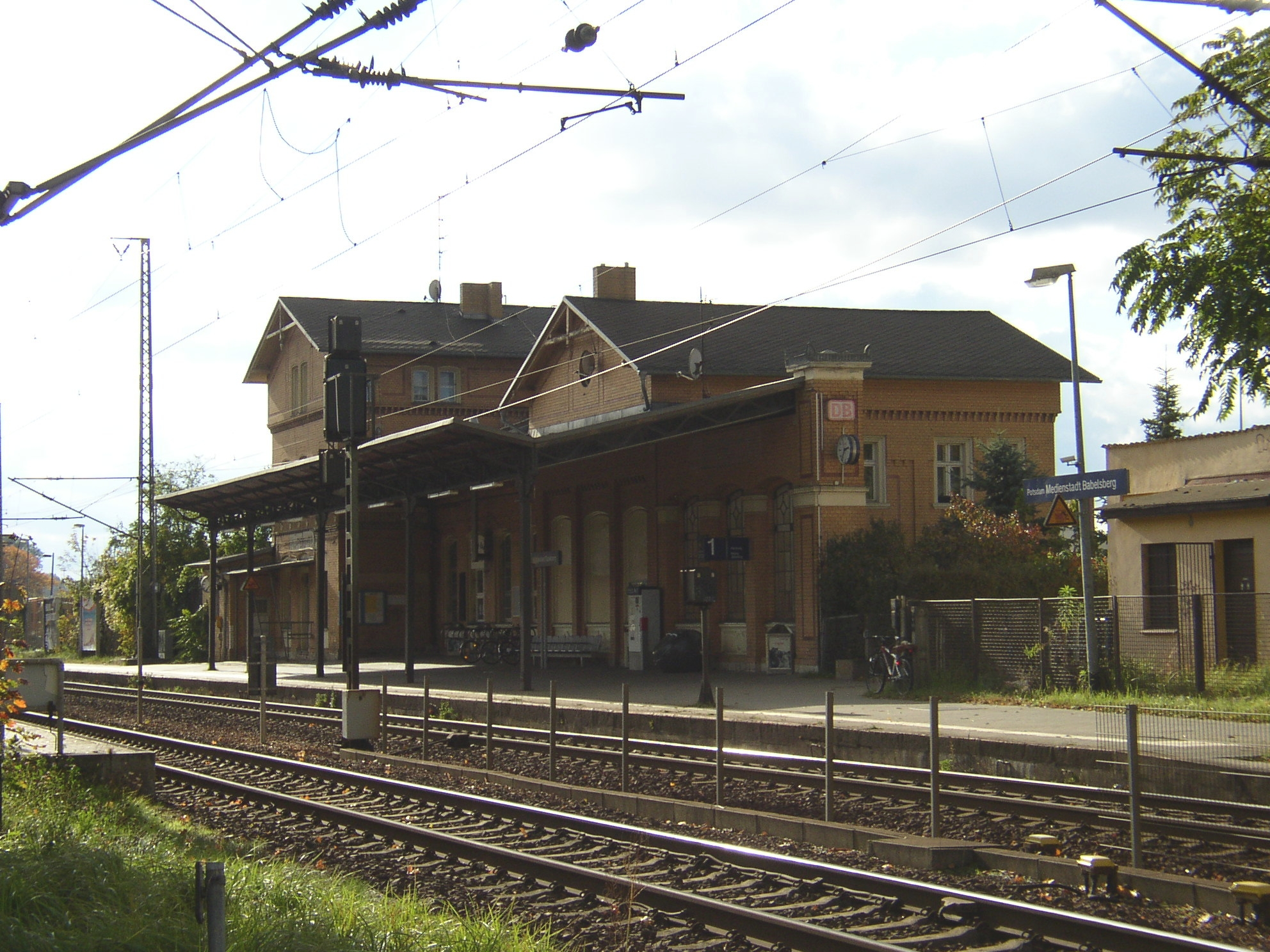
- View of the platform from the level crossing

General information
- Location: Drewitz, Potsdam, Brandenburg; Germany
- Coordinates: 52°22′55″N 13°7′18″E
- Line(s): Berlin–Blankenheim railway (KBS 209.33)
- Platforms: 2

Construction
- Accessible: Yes

Other information
- Station code: 5013
- DS100 code: BDW
- IBNR: 8011430
- Category: 5
- Fare zone: VBB: Berlin C and Potsdam B/5851
- Website: www.bahnhof.de

History
- Opened: 15 May 1879
- Previous names: Drewitz (1879–2000)

Passengers
- < 2,500/day

Services
Preceding station	DB Regio Nordost	Following station
Potsdam-Rehbrücke towards Dessau Hbf	RE 7	Berlin-Wannsee towards Senftenberg
Preceding station	Ostdeutsche Eisenbahn	Following station
Berlin-Wannsee Terminus	RB 37	Potsdam-Rehbrücke towards Beelitz Stadt
Location

Potsdam Medienstadt Babelsberg station is a station on the Berlin–Blankenheim railway located in the east of the Potsdam district of Drewitz near Babelsberg, the historic center of the German film industry, and the former West Berlin exclave of Steinstücken. The station's DS-100 code is BDW and its station's numerical code is 5013. It is classified by Deutsche Bahn as a category 5 station.

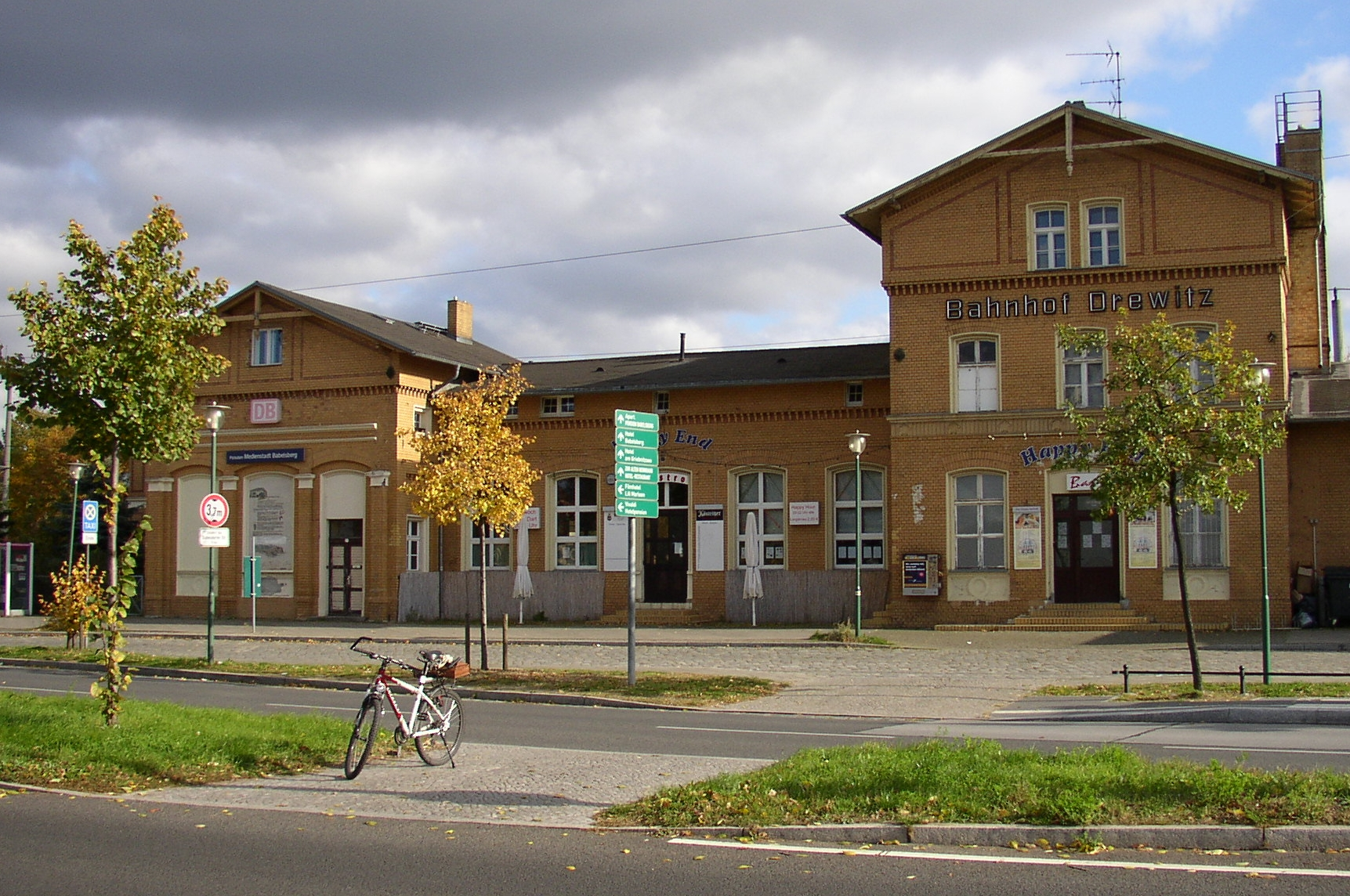
Station building in October 2007, still displaying the old name

The station was opened on 15 May 1879 with the name of Drewitz. It was a freight border crossing point from East Germany to West Berlin from 1949 to 1990. Numerous safety devices were installed for this purpose such as special points that would prevent an unauthorized movement of a locomotive towards Berlin-Wannsee in the American sector of Berlin. This meant that some sets of points would cause trains making unauthorized movements to derail.

After the reunification of Germany, an ICE connecting train ran from Berlin Zoologischer Garten through Drewitz station to Michendorf as electrification had not been completed on any line from the west to Berlin.

On 28 May 2000, the station's name was changed to the current name in order to emphasize its proximity to the Babelsberg Media City (Medienstadt), including Babelsberg Studio.

The entire building is under heritage protection.

== Rail services ==
The following services stop at the station:

Line	Route
RE 7	Dessau – Bad Belzig – Michendorf – Potsdam Medienstadt Babelsberg – Berlin – BER Airport – Wünsdorf-Waldstadt – Lübbenau – Senftenberg
RB 37	Berlin-Wannsee – Potsdam Medienstadt Babelsberg – Michendorf – Beelitz Stadt
