= Wilhelmshorst station =

Railway station in Germany

Wilhelmshorst
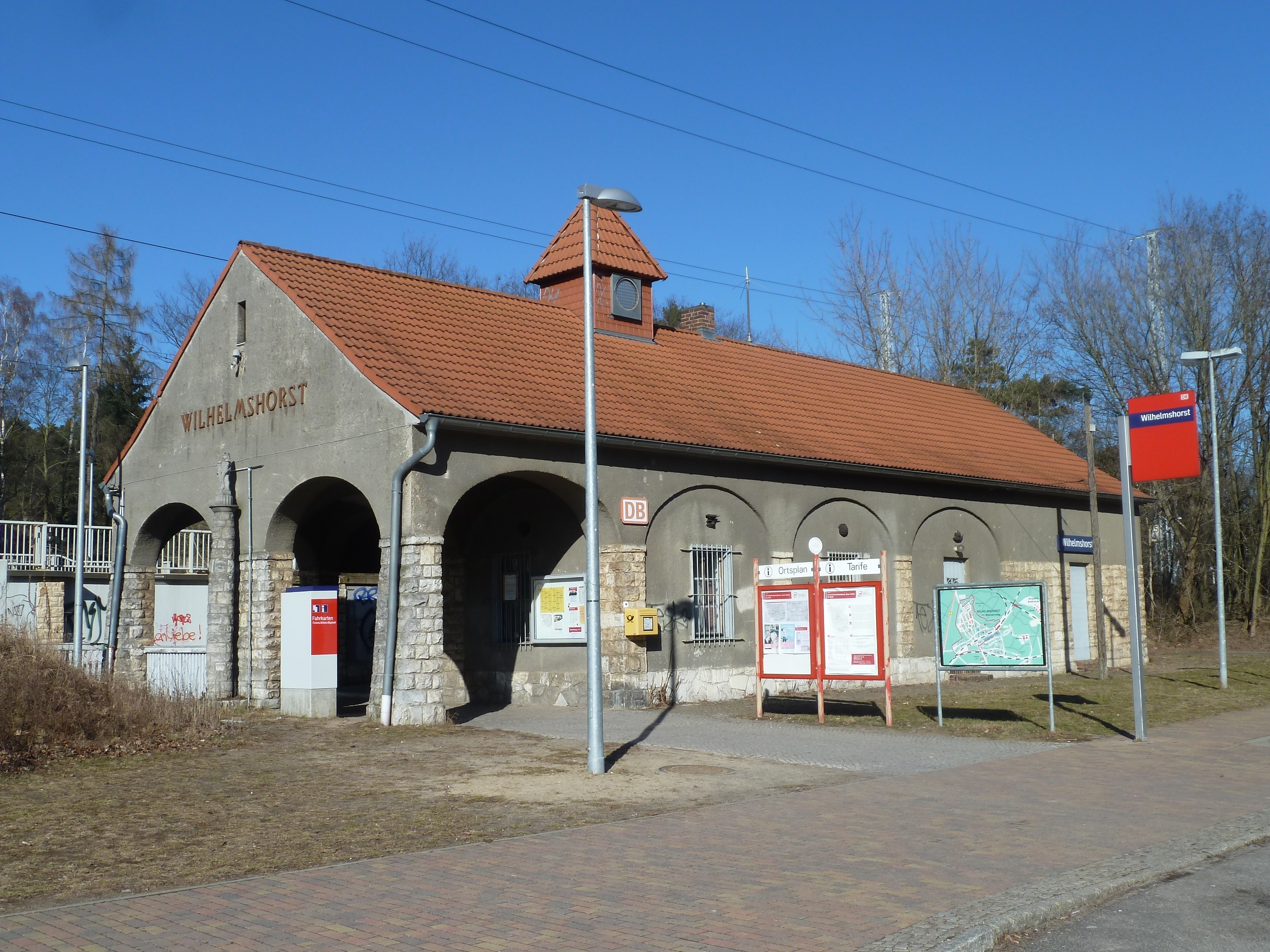
- 2012

General information
- Location: Dr. Albert-Schweitzer-Straße 5; 14552 Wilhelmshorst; Brandenburg; Germany
- Coordinates: 52.331365°N 13.067512°E
- Owner: DB Netz
- Operator: DB Station&Service
- Line: Berlin-Blankenheim railway
- Train operators: DB Regio Nordost; Ostdeutsche Eisenbahn

Other information
- Station code: 6773
- DS100 code: BWHO
- IBNR: 8010378
- Category: 5
- Fare zone: VBB: Berlin C and Potsdam C/5950
- Website: www.bahnhof.de

Services
Preceding station	DB Regio Nordost	Following station
Michendorf towards Dessau Hbf	RE 7	Potsdam-Rehbrücke towards Senftenberg
Preceding station	Ostdeutsche Eisenbahn	Following station
Potsdam-Rehbrücke towards Berlin-Wannsee	RB 37	Michendorf towards Beelitz Stadt
Location
- Location within Brandenburg Location within Germany Location within Europe

Wilhelmshorst station is a railway station in the Wilhelmshorst district of the municipality Michendorf located in the district of Potsdam-Mittelmark, Brandenburg, Germany.

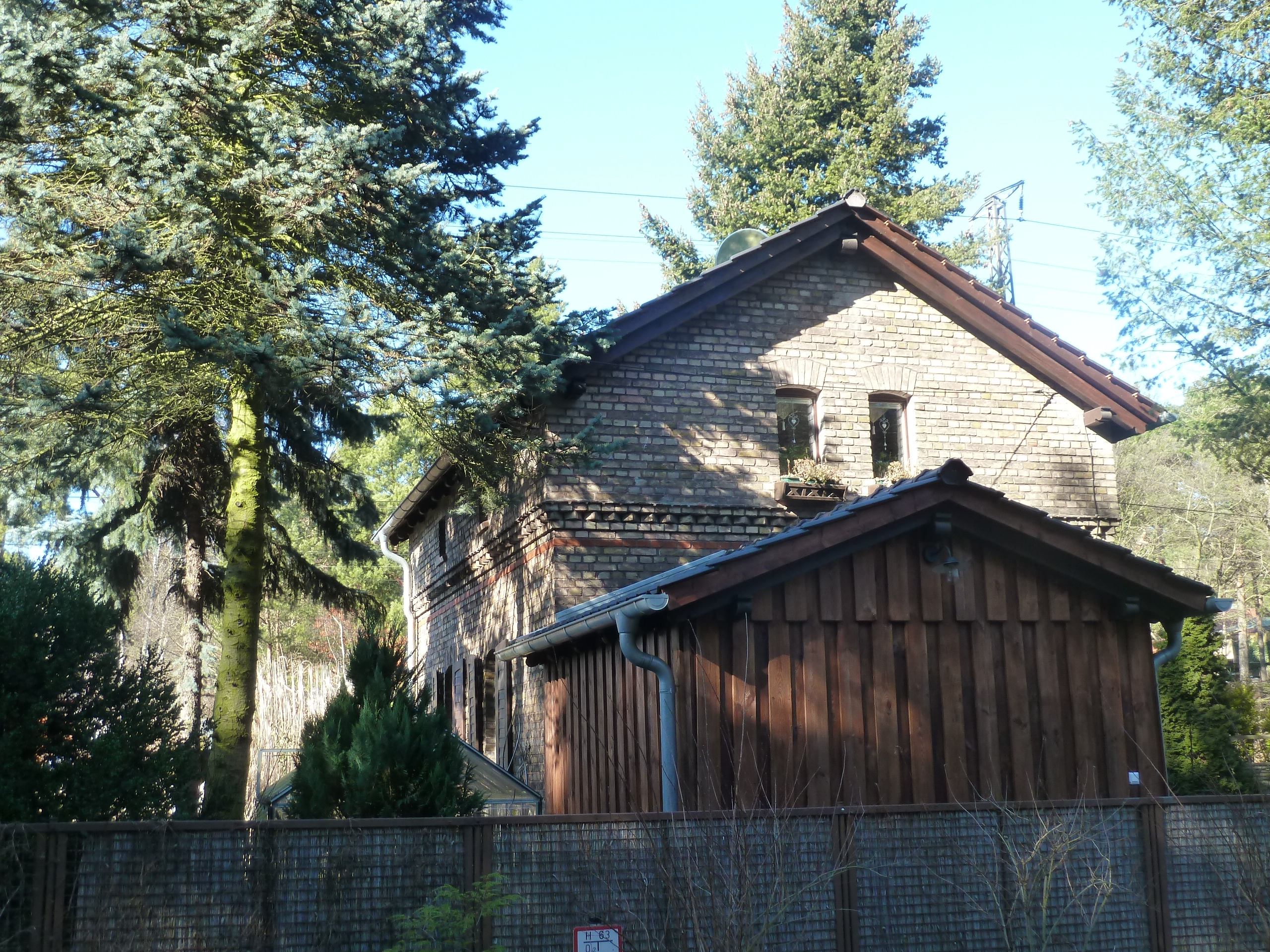
Historic signalman's house (2012).
