= Trams in Potsdam =

Tram system in Germany

Potsdam tramway network
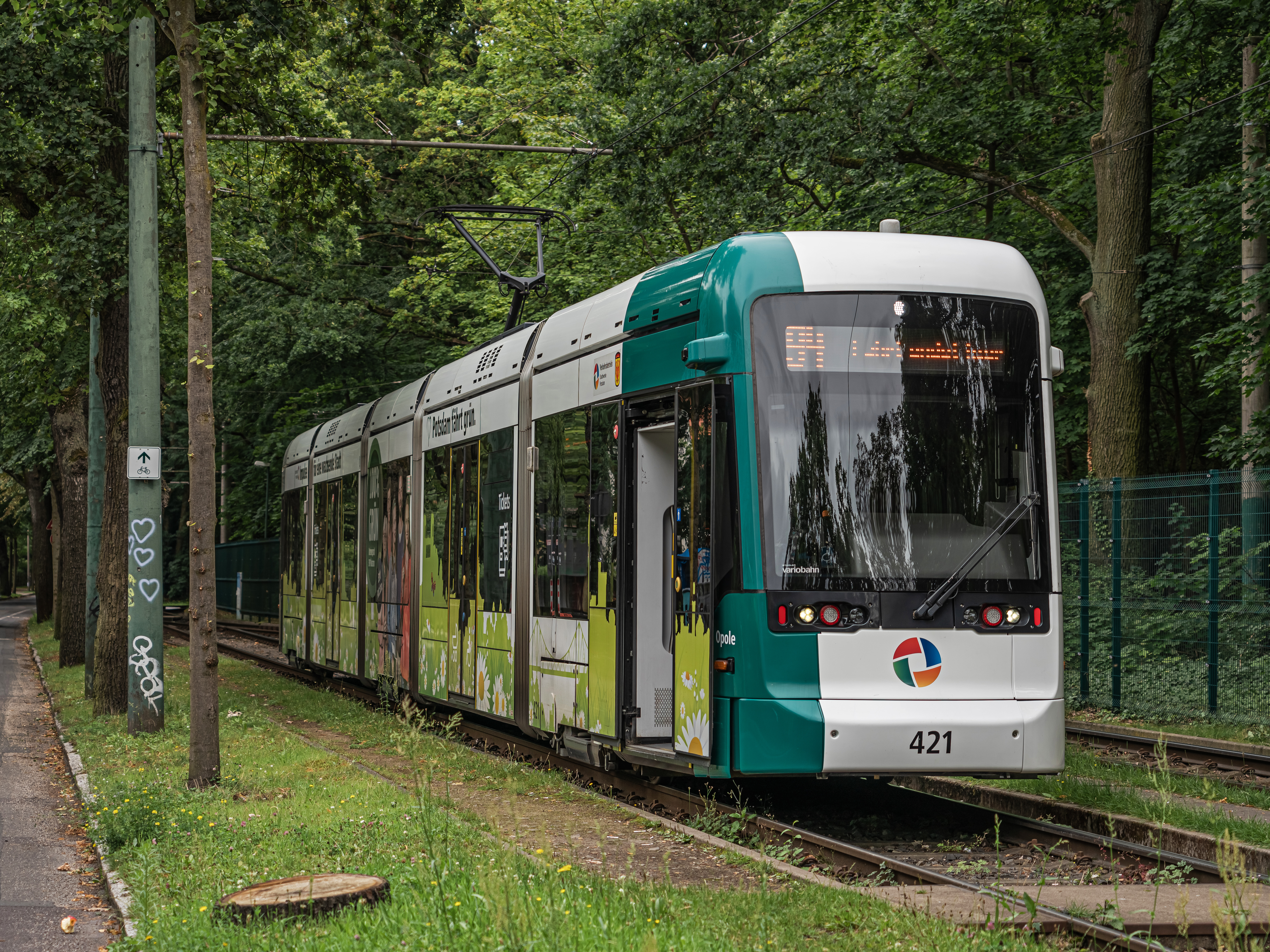

Operation
- Locale: Potsdam, Brandenburg, Germany

Statistics
Horsecar era: 1880–1907
- Status: Converted to electricity
- Track gauge: 1,435 mm (4 ft 8 1/2 in) (standard gauge)
- Propulsion system: Horses
Electric tram era: since 1907
- Status: Operational
- Lines: 7
- Operator: Verkehrsbetrieb Potsdam(ViP) (since 1990)
- Track gauge: 1,435 mm (4 ft 8 1/2 in) ((standard gauge)
- Propulsion system: Electricity
- Electrification: 600 V DC overhead
- Stock: 17 Combino; 18 Tatra KT4DC; 18 Variobahn
- Route length: 28.9 km (18 mi)
- Stops: 63
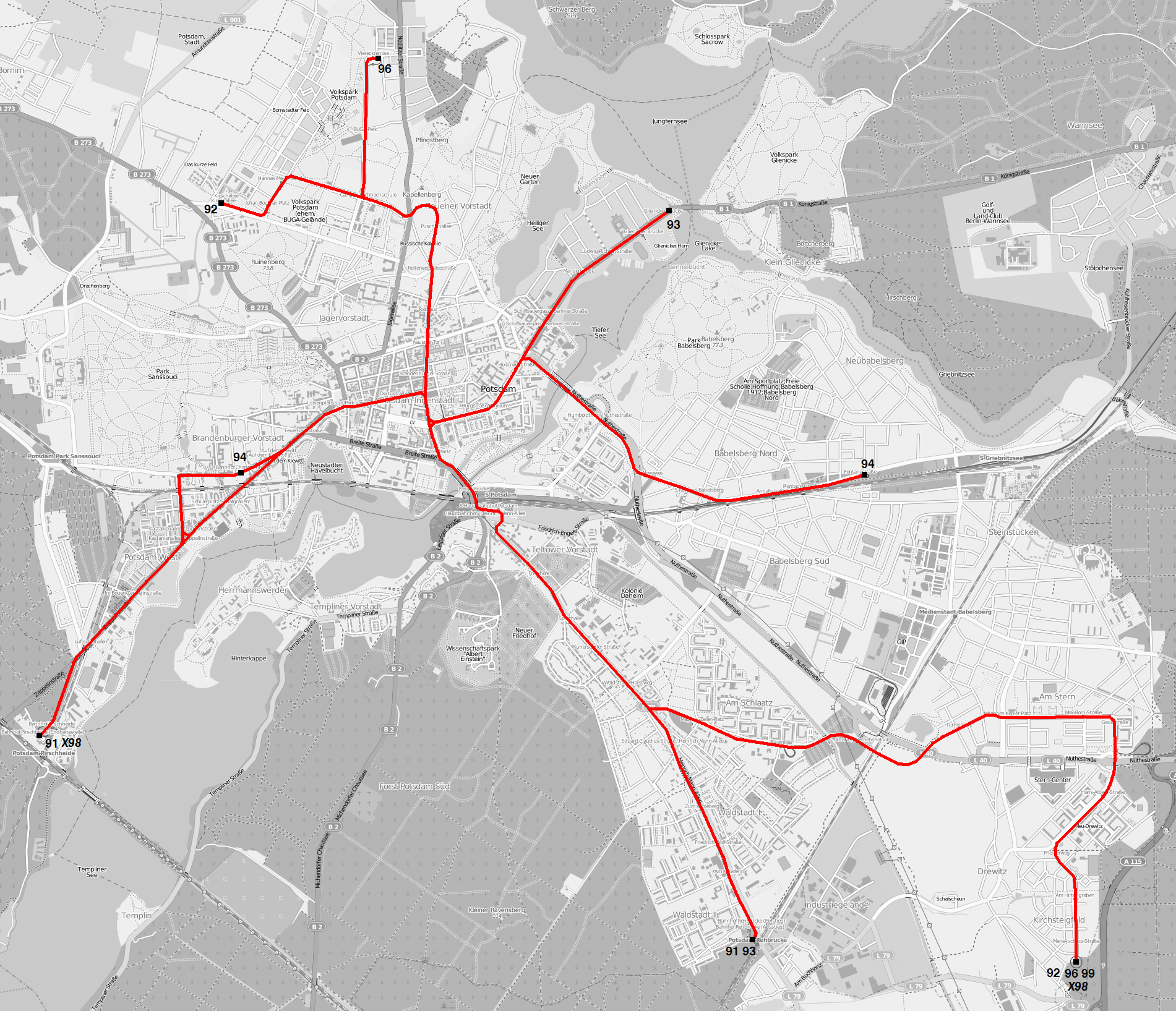
- Map of the network, 2009
- Website: http://www.swp-potsdam.de/swp/de/stadtwerke-potsdam/home.php Stadtwerke (and Verkehrsbetrieb) Potsdam (in German)

The Potsdam tramway network (German: Straßenbahnnetz Potsdam) is a network of tramways forming part of the public transport system in Potsdam, the capital city of the federal state of Brandenburg, Germany.

The network is owned and operated by the public citizen company Verkehrsbetrieb Potsdam(ViP), and included in the "Berlin C" fare zone (Tarifbereich Berlin C) of the Verkehrsverbund Berlin-Brandenburg.

== History ==
The network opened on 12 May 1880: It was a horsecar system owned by the society Reymer & Masch, named Potsdamer Straßenbahn-Gesellschaft and consisted of a pair of lines. 1907 saw the introduction of electric trams which ran on a new line of 8 km (5.0 mi). In 1908 the network consisted of 4 lines (named from A to D) and in 1949 of 5 lines (named from 1 to 5).

At the end of the 1950s, new streetcar models were introduced (typical during the DDR era), the Gothawagen (T57, G4-61, G4-65 and T2-62), produced in the Thuringian town of Gotha by the Gothaer Waggonfabrik.

In the 1980s, a pair of new routes were built: in 1984 through the new residential center in Babelsberg and in 1988 from Am Stern stop to the new south-eastern residential area in Drewitz. The Czech trams Tatra KT4 were introduced in 1993, and the modern Combino and Variotram in the 2000s. Some of the Tatra KT4D were given to Ploiești, an industrial city in Romania. Delivery of the Stadler Tramlink started in 2025.

== Network ==
Line network, 2024

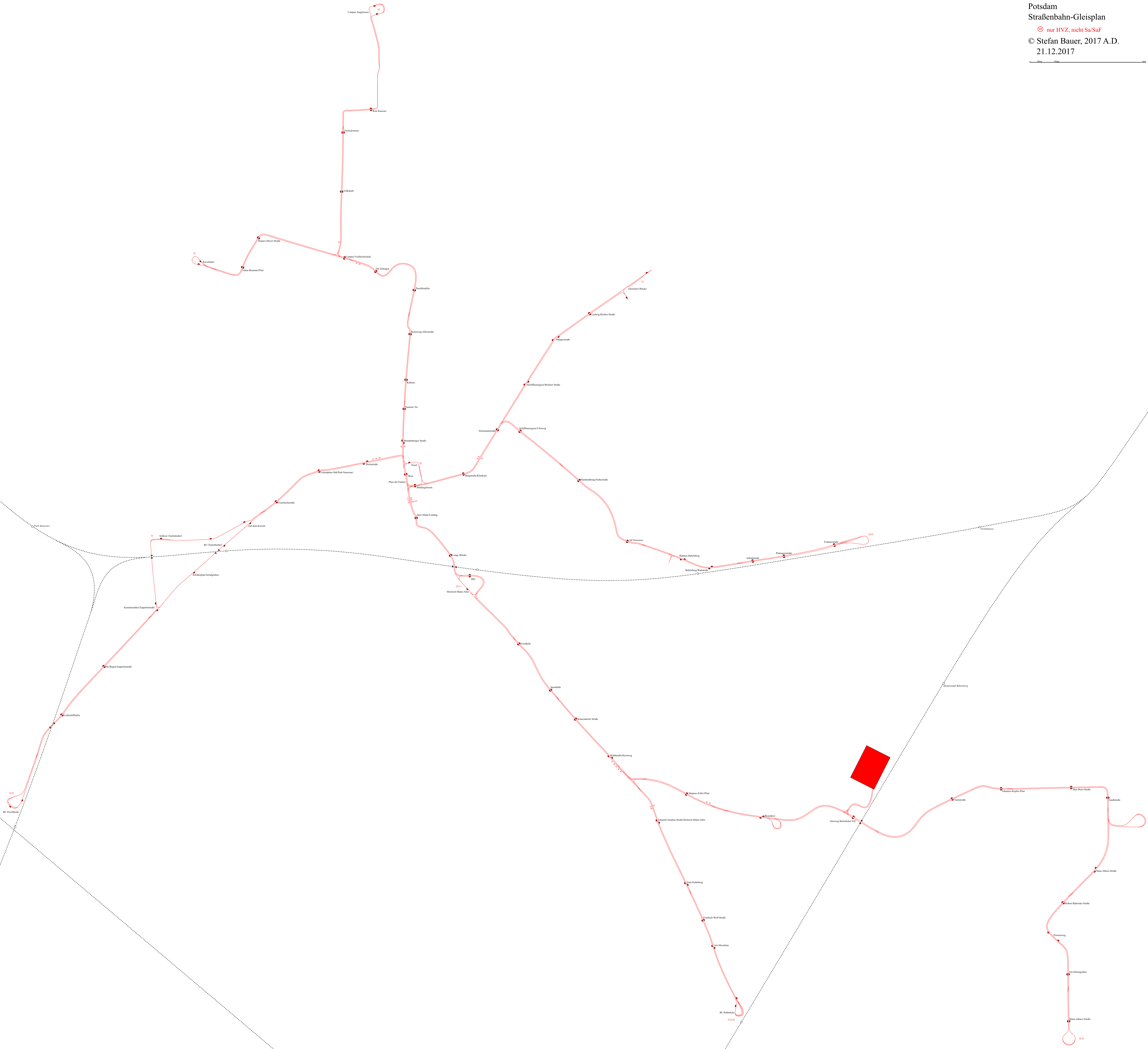
Track plan, 2017

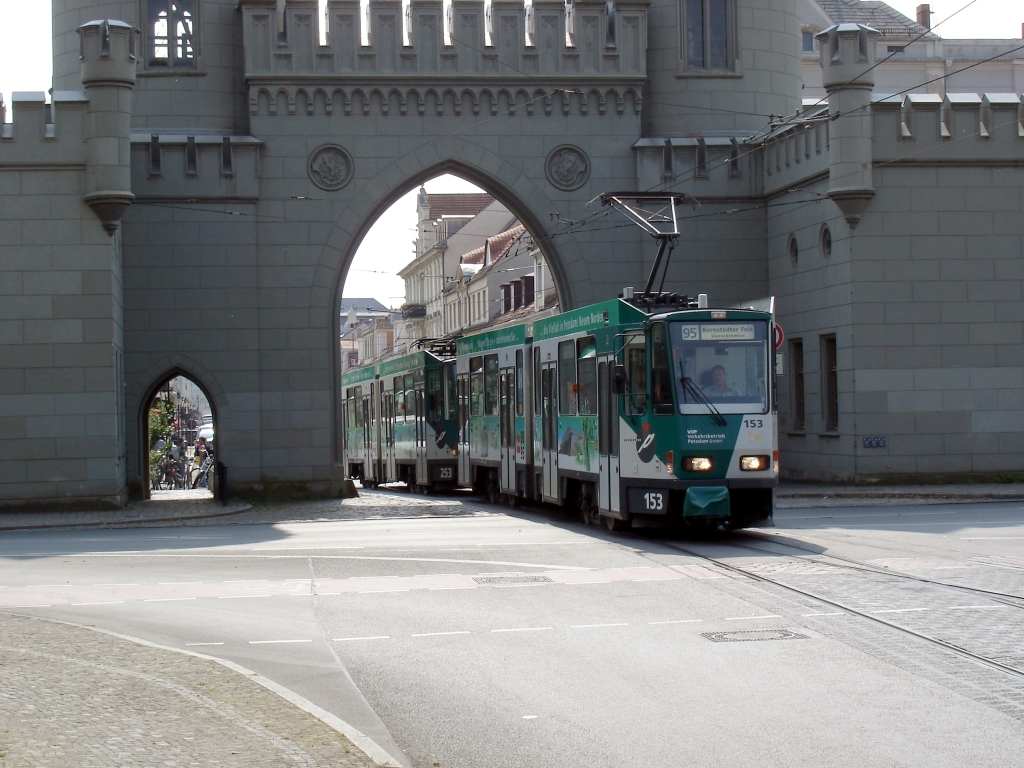
KT4Dm-cars 153/253 at Nauener Tor

The Potsdam route network is a standard-gauge railway. It is 28.9 kilometres (18.0 mi) long and has 63 stops. The track length is 59.6 kilometres (37.0 mi). It is served by five main and two amplifier lines. It is almost continuously double tracked, only the Nauener Tor is crossed by means of a gauntlet track.

The network consists, as of June 2022, of 7 lines:

91	Bhf. Pirschheide ↔ Bhf. Rehbrücke
92	Bornstedt, Kirschallee ↔ Schlaatz, Bisamkiez (↔ Kirchsteigfeld, Marie-Juchacz-Straße) to Kirchsteigfeld only Saturday and Sunday
93	Glienicker Brücke ↔ Bhf. Rehbrücke
94	(Bhf. Pirschheide ↔) Schloss Charlottenhof ↔ Babelsberg, Fontanestraße
96	Campus Jungfernsee ↔ Kirchsteigfeld, Marie-Juchacz-Straße
98	(Schloss Charlottenhof ↔ Bhf. Rehbrücke, Bisamkiez) only Monday to Friday in the rush hour and not in the school holidays
99	Babelsberg, Fontanestraße ↔ S Hauptbahnhof (↔ Schlaatz, Bisamkiez) from Bisamkiez only in the morning, to Bisamkiez only in the evening

The tram lines 91 to 96 operate on all days according to a uniform timetable scheme. The basic scheme of the tram lines is a 20-minute-cyclic schedule. The timetable of the tram lines are coordinated at the interchange points Potsdam Hauptbahnhof and Babelsberg station with the Berlin S-Bahn.

Lines 98 is a peak-only line, which operates on school days. On Line 92, extra rides are offered throughout the route in the rush hour. As a result, lines 92 (with 2 courses) and 96 (with one course) run at 6/7/7-minute intervals, which in turn means that line 91 and 92 as well as 96 and 93 serve the transit network at intervals shorter than 10 minutes.

The network is navigated with uni-directional vehicles. There are turning loops at all terminal stops. Exceptions are Glienicker Brücke, which is crossed by a triangular junction, as well as Schloss Charlottenhof, where the tramcars are turned around by a block bypass.

== Photogallery ==
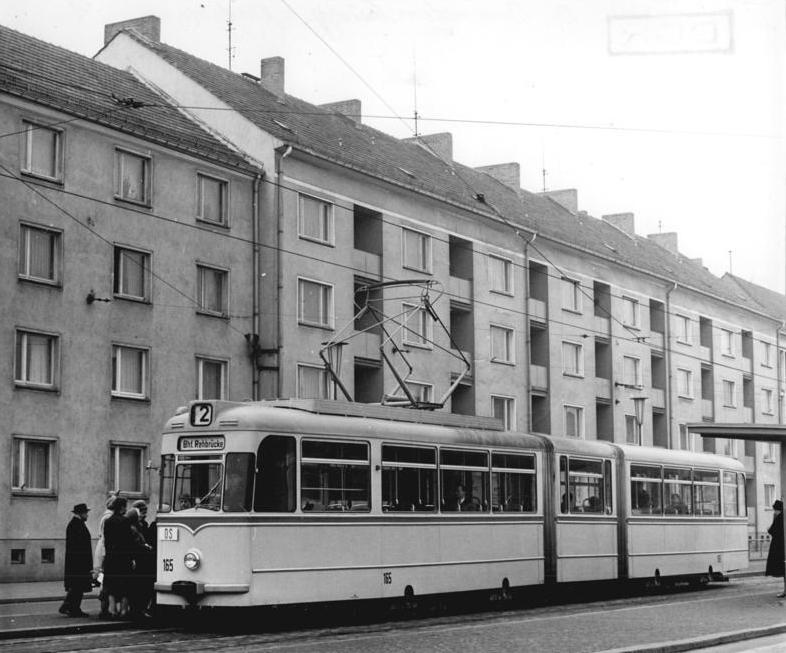
A "Gothawagen" at Platz der Einheit in 1965

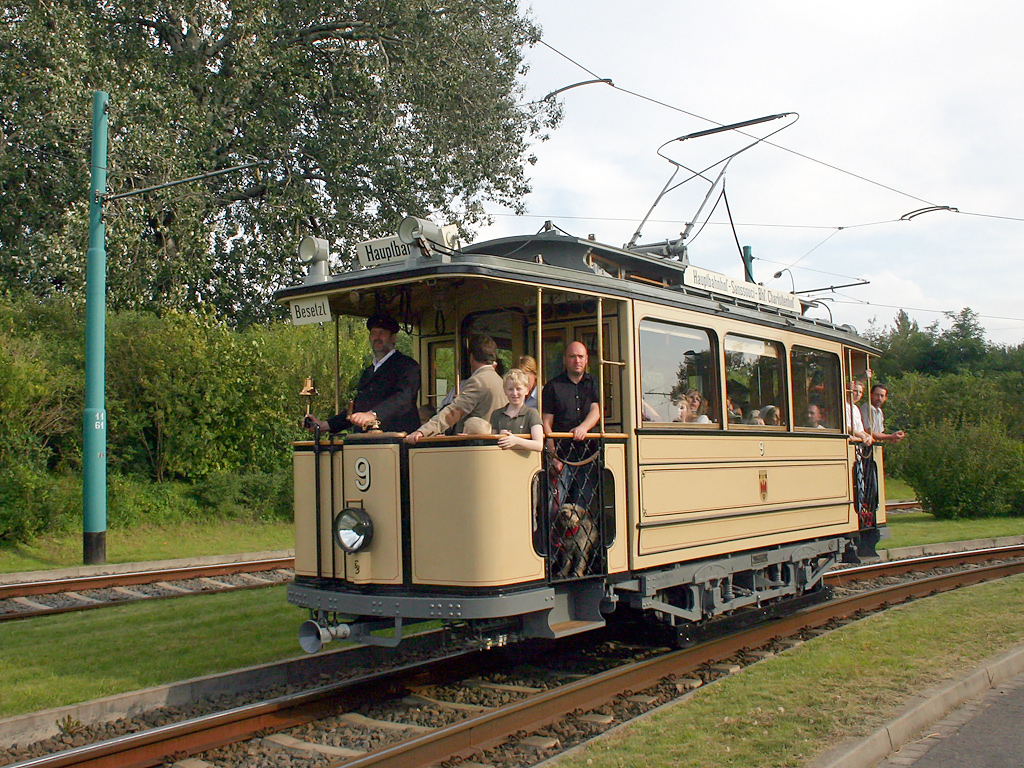
Historical 1907 Triebwagen Nr. 9 in 2006
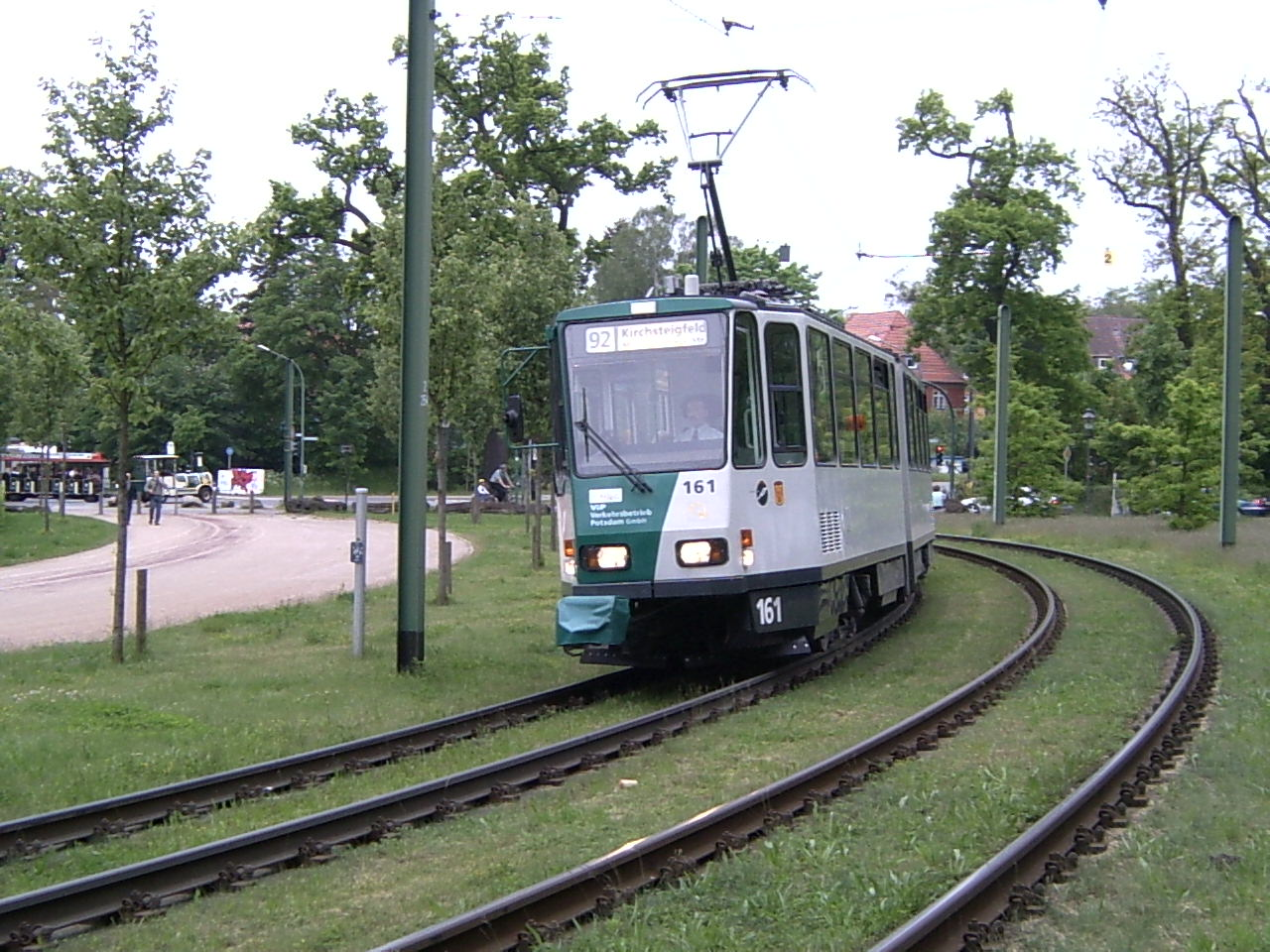
A "Tatra KT4" at Schragen

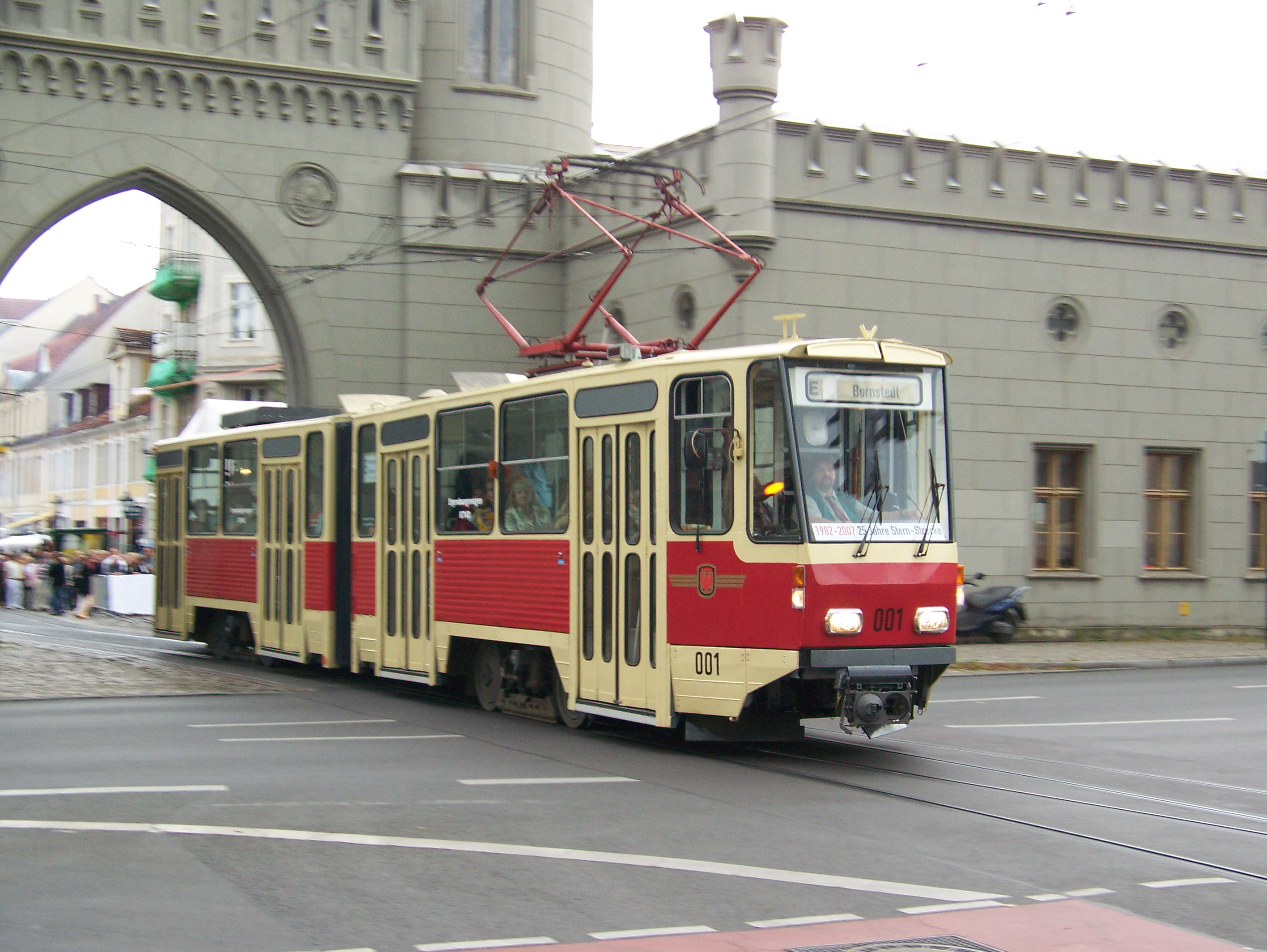
A "Tatra KT4" at Nauener Tor

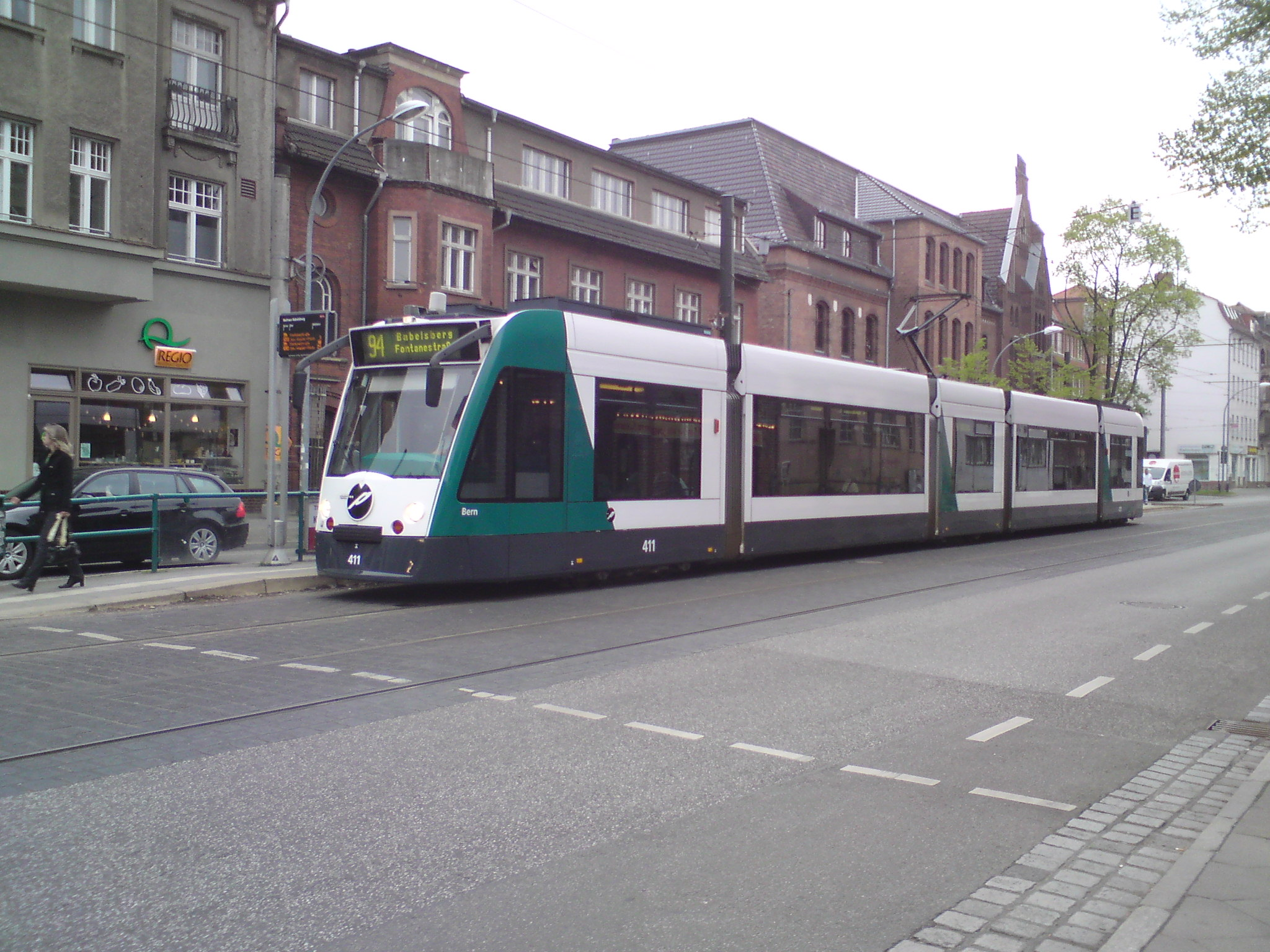
A "Combino" at Rathaus Babelsberg

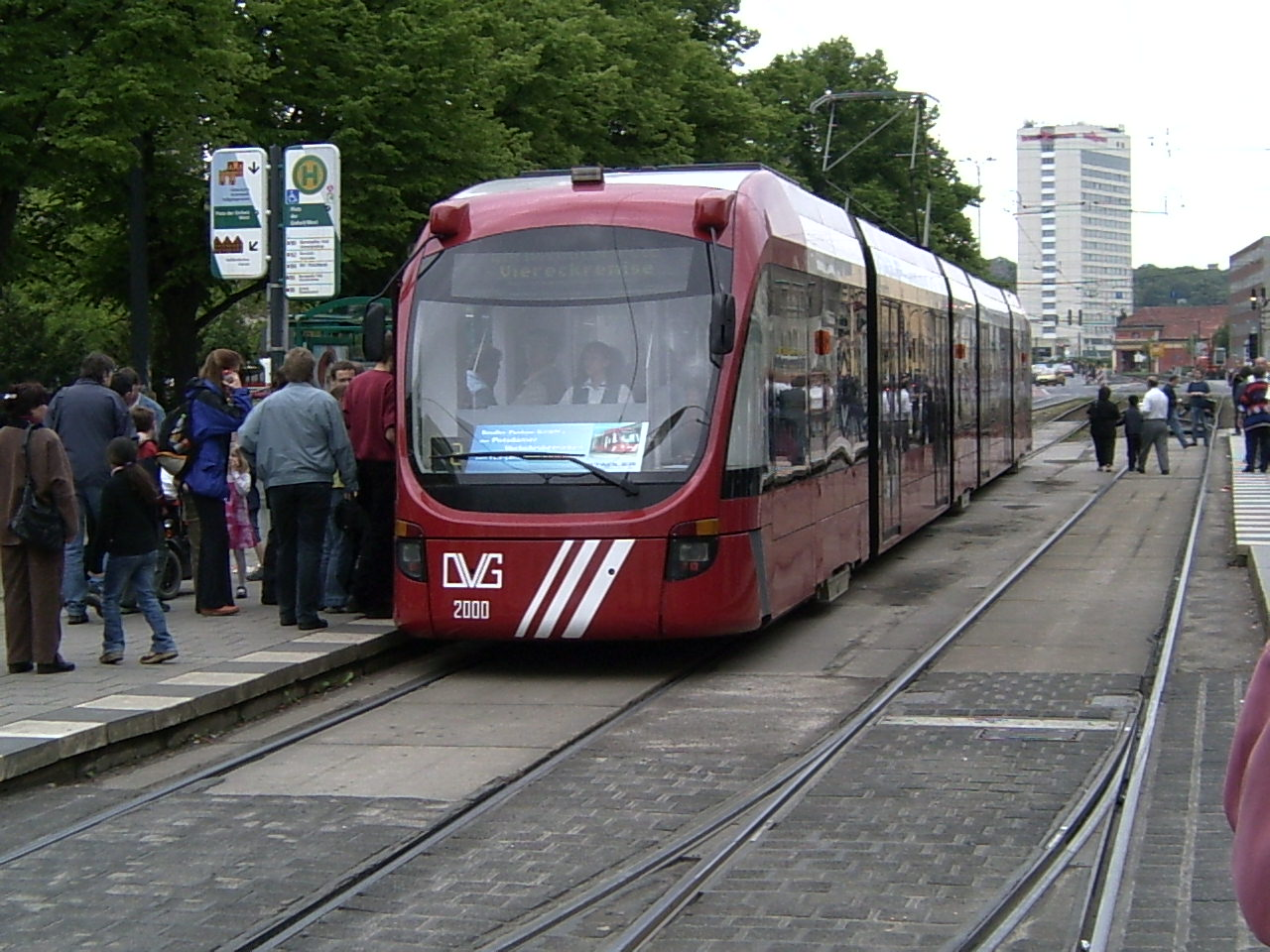
A "Variotram" used in Duisburg at Platz der Einheit

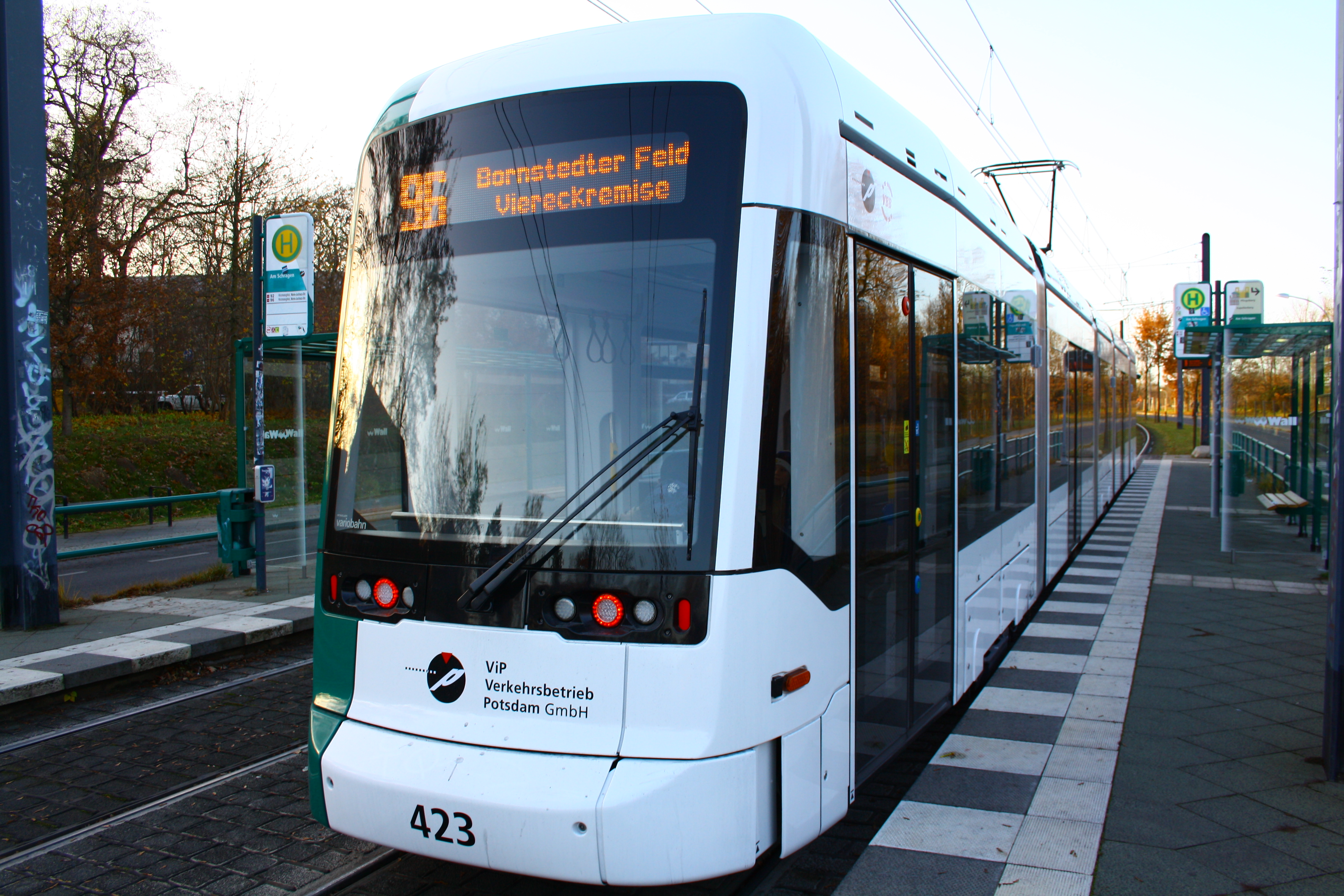
The final Potsdam version of the new "Variotram"

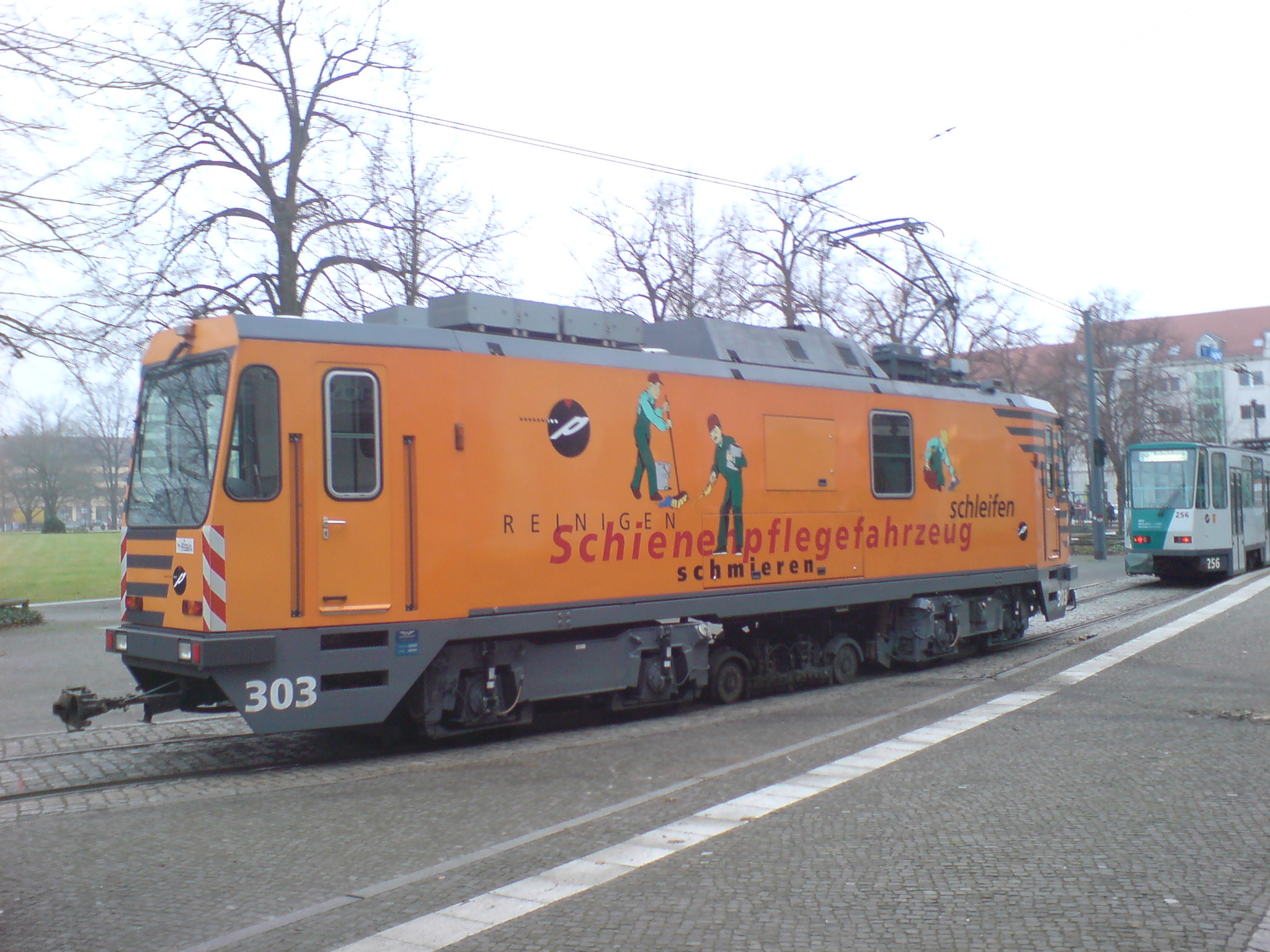
A rail maintenance vehicle at Platz der Einheit

== See also ==
- Berlin Tramway
- Kiewitt Ferry
