= Berlin-Nikolassee station =

Railway station in Berlin, Germany

Coordinates: 52°25′54″N 13°11′36″E

Nikolassee
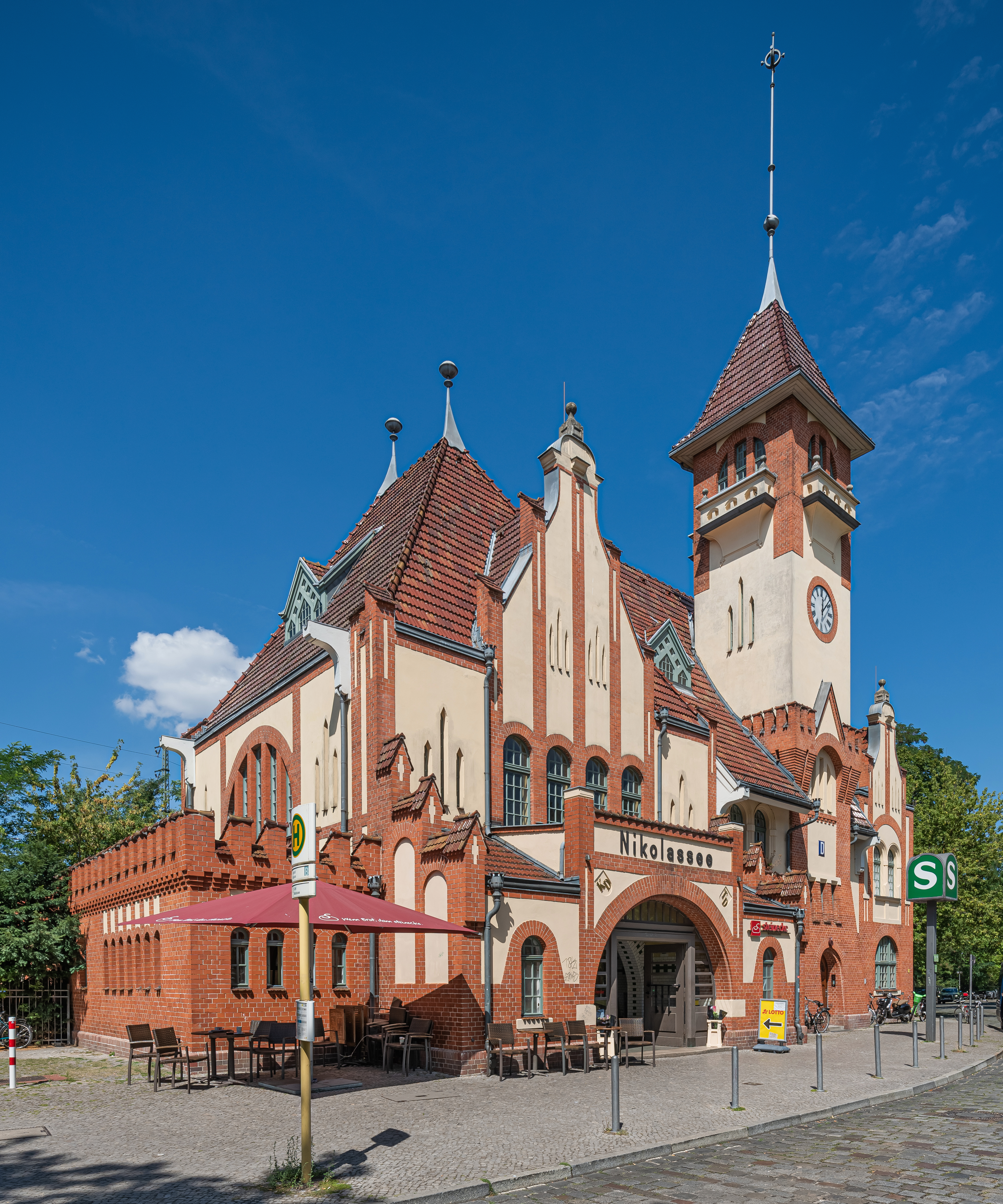

General information
- Location: Hohenzollernplatz 6, Nikolassee; Steglitz-Zehlendorf, Berlin, Berlin; Germany
- Line: Wannsee Railway

Other information
- Station code: 4557
- DS100 code: BNI
- Category: 4
- Fare zone: : Berlin B/5656

Services
Preceding station	Berlin S-Bahn	Following station
Schlachtensee towards Oranienburg	S1	Wannsee Terminus
Wannsee towards Potsdam Hbf	S7	Grunewald towards Ahrensfelde
Location

Berlin-Nikolassee station (German: Bahnhof Berlin-Nikolassee) is a railway station in the Nikolassee area of Berlin, Germany. It is served by trains of the Berlin S-Bahn, and is notable for its prominent Neo-Gothic entrance building.

== Overview ==
S-Bahn line S1 operates to and from central Berlin via the Nord-Süd-Tunnel and terminates one station down the line at Wannsee. Line S7 operates to and from central Berlin via the Stadtbahn, and passes through Wannsee on its route to Potsdam Hbf.

The two S-Bahn lines are served by separate island platforms on different alignments, with the S1 platform at a lower level than the S7 platform. A pair of main line tracks run parallel to the S7, but trains on these lines do not stop at Nikolassee, and no platforms are provided. The two platforms are linked to each other, and to the station building, by walkways.

A flying junction to the west of the station keeps the main line segregated from the S-Bahn lines. The same flying junction brings the two S-Bahn lines together, with the S1 lines between the S7 lines so as to allow cross-platform interchange at Wannsee.

The entire station complex is a listed building.
