= Berlin-Wannsee station =

Railway station in Berlin, Germany

Berlin-Wannsee
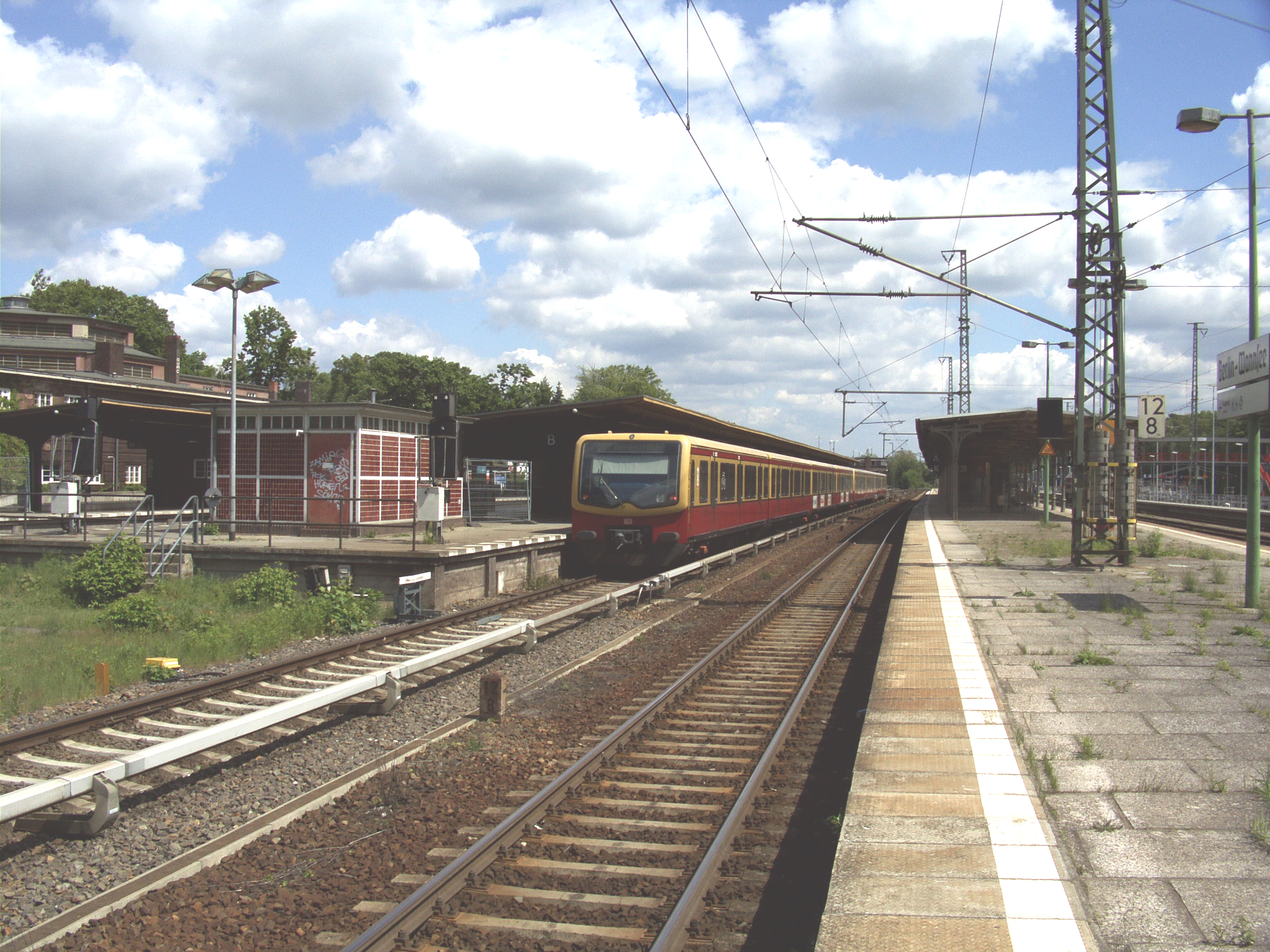
- S-Bahn train at Berlin-Wannsee station

General information
- Location: Steglitz-Zehlendorf, Berlin, Berlin; Germany
- Coordinates: 52°25′17″N 13°10′45″E
- Owner: DB Netz
- Operator: DB Station&Service
- Lines: Wannsee Railway; Berlin-Blankenheim railway
- Platforms: 4 suburban 3 long-distance

Construction
- Accessible: Yes (except platform 8)
- Architect: Richard Brademann

Other information
- Station code: 566
- DS100 code: BWS
- Category: 2
- Fare zone: : Berlin B/5656
- Website: www.bahnhof.de

History
- Opened: 1 June 1874

Services
Preceding station	DB Fernverkehr	Following station
Potsdam Hbf towards Köln Hbf	ICE 10	Berlin Hbf towards Berlin Ostbahnhof
Potsdam Hbf towards Rostock Hbf	IC 17	Berlin Hbf towards Ostseebad Binz
Potsdam Hbf towards Norddeich Mole	IC 56	Berlin Zoologischer Garten towards Cottbus Hbf
Preceding station	DB Regio Nordost	Following station
Potsdam Medienstadt Babelsberg towards Dessau Hbf	RE 7	Berlin-Charlottenburg towards Senftenberg
Potsdam Griebnitzsee towards Golm	RB 23	Berlin Charlottenburg towards Berlin Ostbahnhof
Preceding station	Abellio Rail Mitteldeutschland	Following station
Potsdam Hbf towards Thale Hbf or Goslar	Harz-Berlin-Express	Berlin Zoologischer Garten towards Berlin Ostbahnhof
Preceding station	Ostdeutsche Eisenbahn	Following station
Potsdam Hbf towards Brandenburg Hbf or Magdeburg Hbf	RE 1	Berlin-Charlottenburg towards Cottbus Hbf or Frankfurt (Oder)
Terminus	RB 37	Potsdam Medienstadt Babelsberg towards Beelitz Stadt
Preceding station	Berlin S-Bahn	Following station
Nikolassee towards Oranienburg	S1	Terminus
Potsdam Griebnitzsee towards Potsdam Hbf	S7	Nikolassee towards Ahrensfelde
Location

Berlin-Wannsee station (in German Bahnhof Berlin-Wannsee) is a railway station opened in 1874 which lies in the Wannsee district of Berlin, the capital city of Germany. It is an important traffic junction in south-west Berlin that is served by the RegionalExpress and RegionalBahn trains of the Deutsche Bahn, the Harz-Berlin-Express of Veolia Verkehr and by the Berlin S-Bahn. In summer, Wannsee serves as the Berlin terminal for DB AutoZug car carrying trains to and from southern Europe.

== History ==
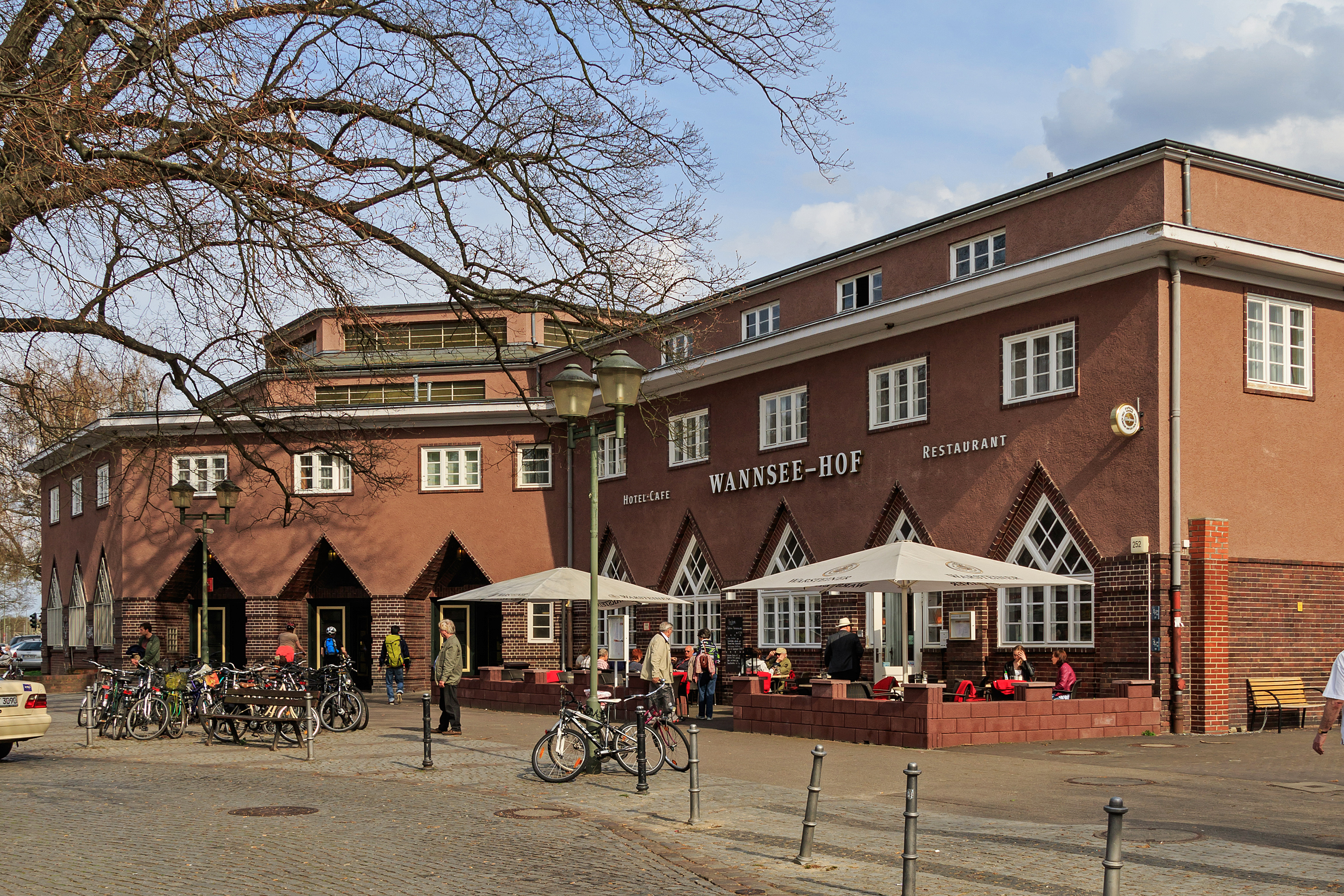
Terminal building

On 13 August 1961, with the construction of Berlin Wall, S-Bahn traffic from Stahnsdorf and Potsdam was discontinued. The only occurrence is that there is only Potsdam-Griebnitzsee shuttle until it was discontinued in 1962. Residents commuted only to East Berlin via the longer Berlin outer ring from Potsdam through regional express trains, and the only trains running on the Berlin–Magdeburg railway was transit traffic from the West Berlin via the GDR to West Germany and other countries.

Later on, after the fall of the Berlin Wall, the line was re-connected to Potsdam again. Reconstruction began in April 1991 and was completed on 1 April 1992. Between the fall of Berlin Wall and 1 April 1992, Potsdam was connected through the fastest way via Griebnitzsee to interchange at Wannsee, besides transit traffic. S1 was temporarily extended from Wannsee to Potsdam Stadt from 2003 to 2006.

S-Bahn line S1 terminates at Wannsee, and operates to and from central Berlin via the Nord-Süd-Tunnel. Line S7 passes through Wannsee on its route to Potsdam Hbf, and operates to and from central Berlin via the Stadtbahn. The two routes to central Berlin diverge by way a flying junction between Wannsee and Nikolassee stations.

The station entrance building lies to the north of the station, and is linked to the platforms by a subway. To the south of the entrance are two island platforms used by the S-Bahn services, and then a single longer island platform used by Deutsche Bahn and Veolia trains. The AutoZug terminal is to the south of the station.

== Train services ==
In the 2026 timetable the following lines stop at the station:

=== Long distance ===
Line	Route		Interval
ICE 10	Cologne – Düsseldorf – Düsseldorf Airport – Duisburg – Essen – Dortmund – Hanover – Magdeburg – Berlin-Wannsee – Berlin Hbf – Berlin Ostbahnhof		One train pair
IC 56	Cottbus – Lübben – Berlin Ostbahnhof –	Berlin – Wannsee – Brandenburg – Magdeburg (– Hannover – Bremen – Oldenburg – Emden – Emden Außenhafen/Norddeich Mole)	Two train pairs
IC 56	Rostock – Neustrelitz – Oranienburg –	Berlin – Wannsee – Brandenburg – Magdeburg (– Hannover – Bremen – Oldenburg – Emden – Emden Außenhafen/Norddeich Mole)	Two train pairs

=== Regional ===
Line	Route	Interval
RE 1	Magdeburg – Brandenburg – Potsdam – Wannsee – Berlin Hbf – Berlin Ostbahnhof – Erkner – Fürstenwalde (Spree) – Frankfurt (Oder) (– Cottbus)	30 min
RE 7	Dessau – Bad Belzig – Michendorf – Wannsee – Berlin Hbf – Berlin Ostbahnhof – Königs Wusterhausen – Lübben (Spreewald) – Senftenberg	30 min
RB 23	Golm – Potsdam – Potsdam Griebnitzsee – Wannsee – Berlin Alexanderplatz – Berlin Ostbahnhof	Some trains in peak
RB 37	Wannsee – Potsdam Medienstadt Babelsberg – Potsdam-Rehbrücke – Wilhelmshorst – Michendorf – Beelitz Stadt	60 min
HBX	Harz-Berlin-Express; Berlin Ostbahnhof – Berlin Hbf – Berlin Wannsee – Potsdam – Magdeburg – Halberstadt (train split) – Quedlinburg – Thale / Wernigerode – Goslar	Individual services Sa + Su

=== Rapid Transit ===
Line	Route	Interval
S1	Wannsee – Steglitz – Schöneberg – Potsdamer Platz – Friedrichstraße – Gesundbrunnen – Wittenau – Oranienburg	10 min
S7	Potsdam – Wannsee – Westkreuz – Hauptbahnhof – Alexanderplatz – Ostbahnhof – Lichtenberg – Ahrensfelde	10 min

== Bus and ferry services ==
The station is served by a number of bus routes which stop at a bus interchange in front of the station. These include Berlin routes 114 (to Krankenhaus Heckeshorn), 118 (to Rathaus Zehlendorf and Steinstücken), 218 (to Theodor-Heuss-Platz U-Bahn station and the Pfaueninsel), 316 (to the Glienicker Brücke in Potsdam) and 318 (to the Hahn-Meitner-Institut). Additionally Havelbus route 620 operates to Teltow.

Berlin ferry line F10 departs from a terminal some 200 metres (660 ft) from the station entrance, providing a crossing to Alt-Kladow on the other side of the Großer Wannsee lake.
