= Potsdam-Rehbrücke station =

Railway station in Germany

Potsdam Rehbrücke
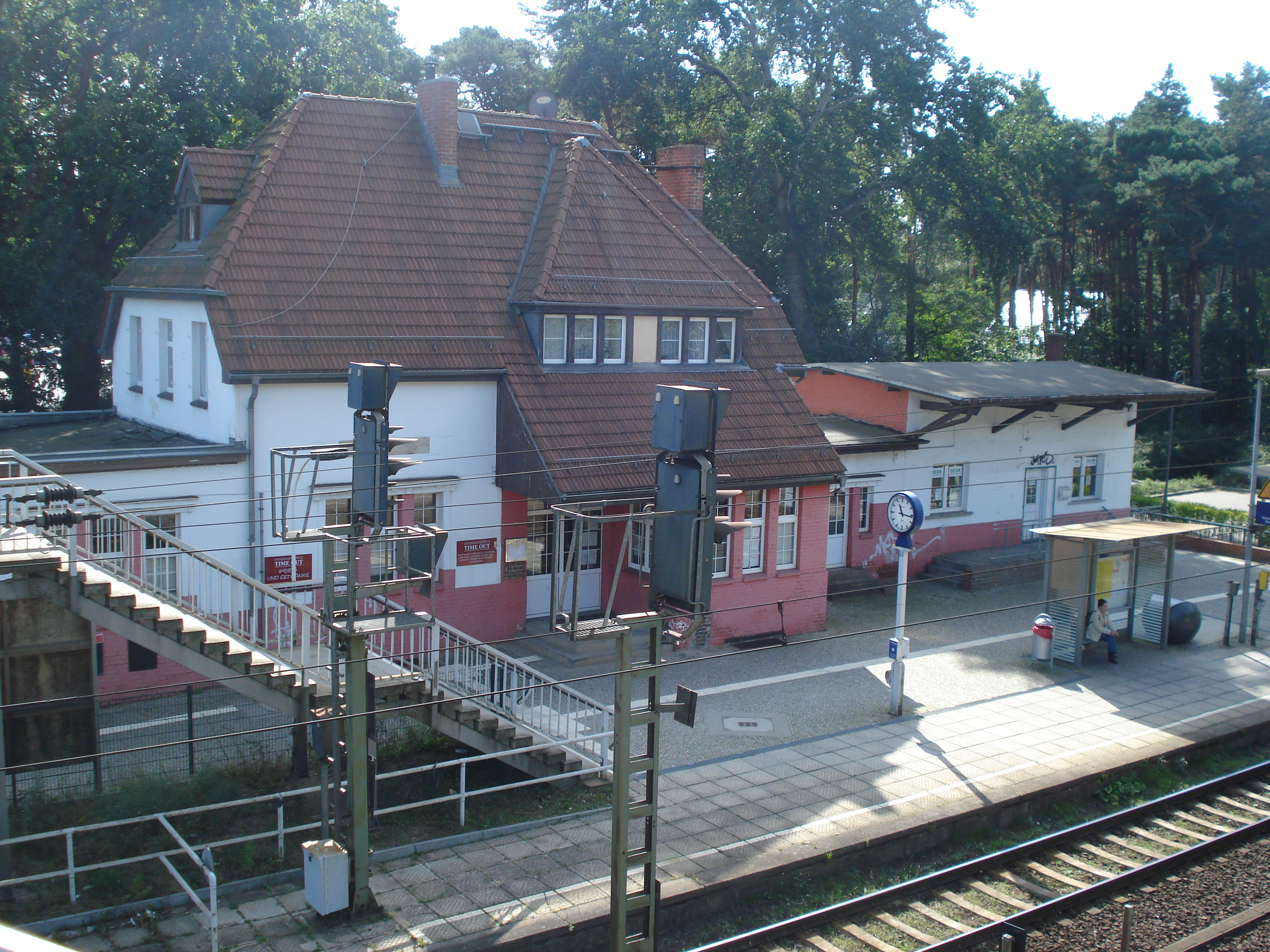
- 2009

General information
- Location: Arthur-Scheunert-Allee; 14558 Nuthetal; Brandenburg; Germany
- Coordinates: 52.358269°N 13.097996°E
- Owner: DB Netz
- Operator: DB Station&Service
- Line: Berlin-Blankenheim railway
- Train operators: DB Regio Nordost; Ostdeutsche Eisenbahn

Other information
- Station code: 5014
- DS100 code: BRC
- IBNR: 8012733
- Category: 6
- Fare zone: VBB: Berlin C and Potsdam B/5851
- Website: www.bahnhof.de

Services
Preceding station	DB Regio Nordost	Following station
Wilhelmshorst towards Dessau Hbf	RE 7	Potsdam Medienstadt Babelsberg towards Senftenberg
Preceding station	Ostdeutsche Eisenbahn	Following station
Potsdam Medienstadt Babelsberg towards Berlin-Wannsee	RB 37	Wilhelmshorst towards Beelitz Stadt
Location

Potsdam-Rehbrücke station is a railway station in the Bergholz-Rehbrücke district of the municipality Nuthetal located in the district of Potsdam-Mittelmark, Brandenburg, Germany.

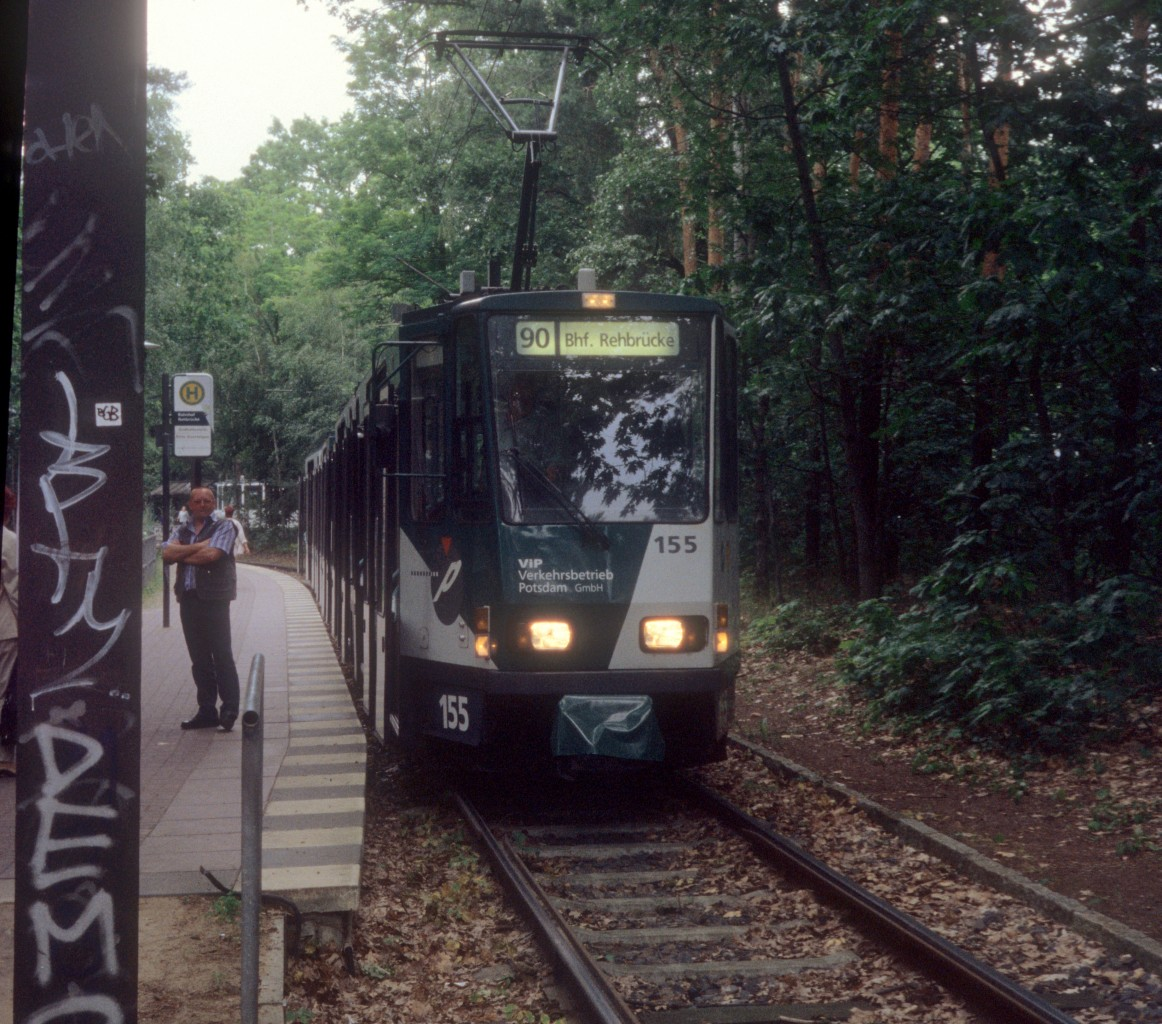
Tram line 90 of Verkehrsbetrieb Potsdam at Potsdam-Rehbrücke station (2004).
