= Johann Gottfried Büring =

German master builder and architect

Johann Gottfried Büring (1723 – after 1788) was a German master builder and architect of the late Baroque period. He was born either in Berlin or Hamburg, but mainly worked in Potsdam, supervising the construction of the Sanssouci Picture Gallery and designing the Nauener Tor and New Palace there. He also designed the Luisenstädtische Kirche in Berlin.
