= Nauener Tor =

City gate in Potsdam, Germany

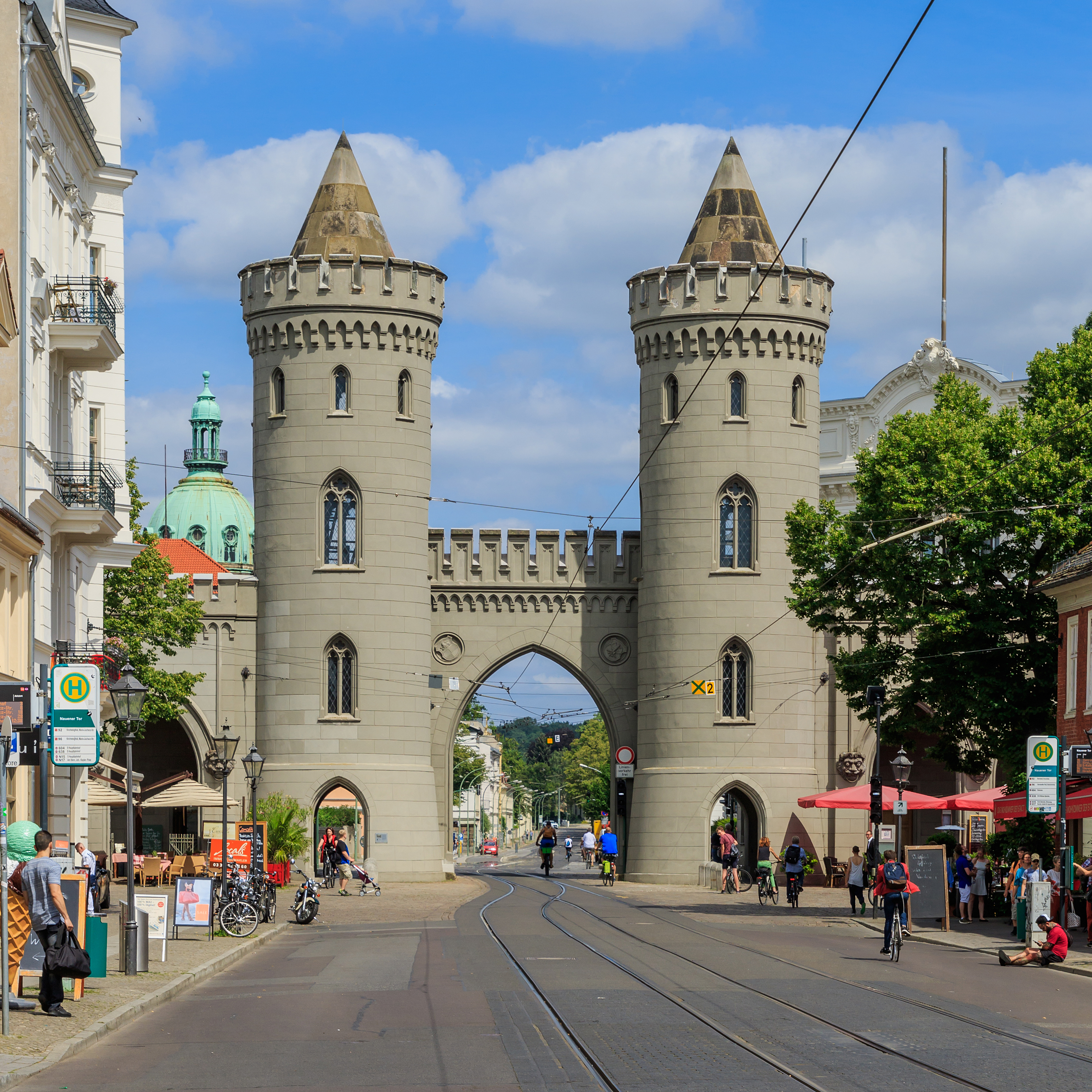
- Interactive map of the Nauener Tor area

General information
- Type: Gate
- Architectural style: Gothic Revival
- Location: Potsdam, Germany
- Coordinates: 52.403°N 13.058°E
- Completed: 1755

Design and construction
- Architect: Johann Gottfried Büring

Nauener Tor (Nauen Gate) is one of the three preserved gates of Potsdam, Germany. It was built in 1755 and is the first example of the influence of English Gothic Revival architecture in Continental Europe.

== History ==
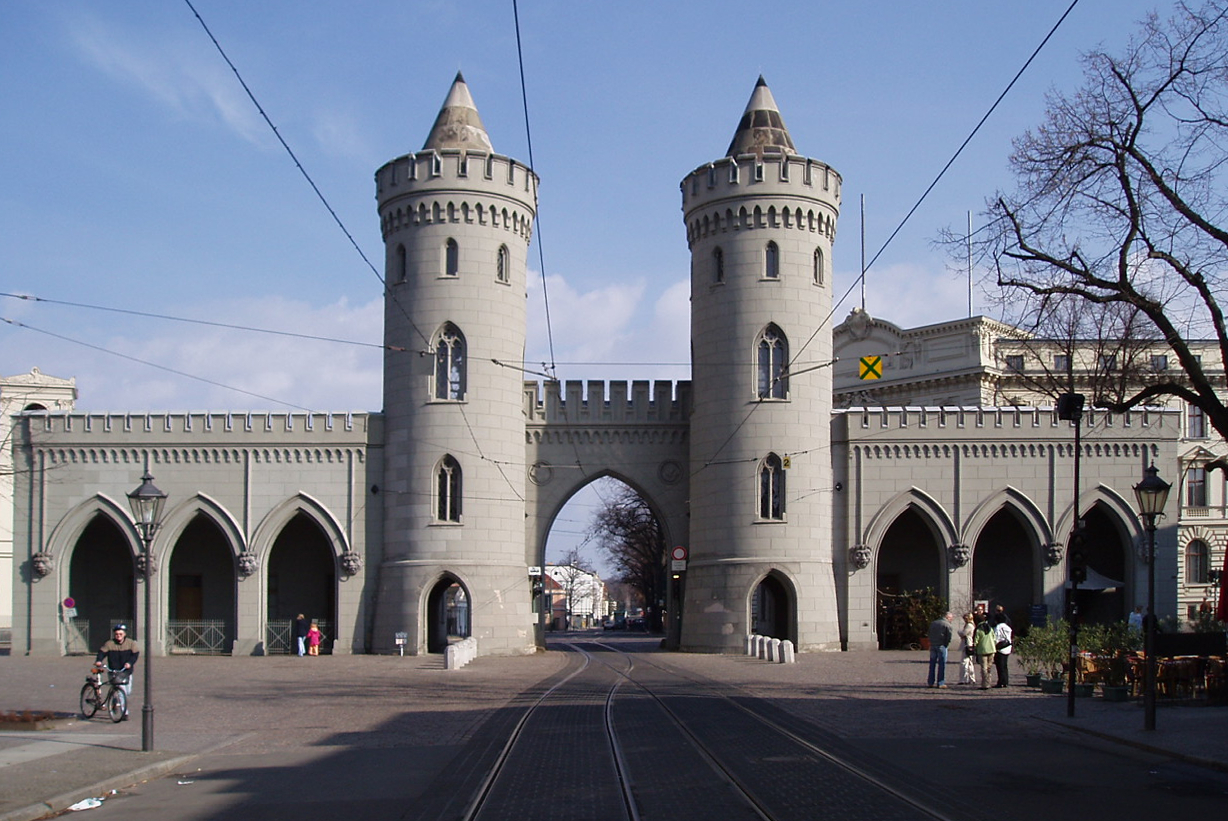
City side

The first Nauener Tor was built around 1720 about 400 metres away from the current site. The second gate was built in 1733 at the current site. In 1755 the gate was rebuilt in its current form by the architect Johann Gottfried Büring based on a sketch by Frederick II. Originally there was a city wall connecting the Nauen gate with the other two gates, the Jägertor and the "small" Brandenburg Gate.

Today the three Potsdam gates are connected by a promenade, instead of a city wall. Nauener Tor is located in close proximity to the Dutch Quarter. Its users were the military and merchants, craftsmen and administrations. Today the square in front of the Nauener Tor has a high density of cafes, restaurants and bars is a popular meeting point of people in Potsdam and their guests. Tram tracks lead directly through Nauener Tor.

== Literature ==
- Paul Sigel, Silke Dähmlow, Frank Seehausen, Lucas Elmenhorst: Architekturführer Potsdam - Dietrich Reimer Verlag, Berlin 2006, ISBN 3-496-01325-7
