= Michendorf station =

Railway station in Michendorf, Germany

Michendorf
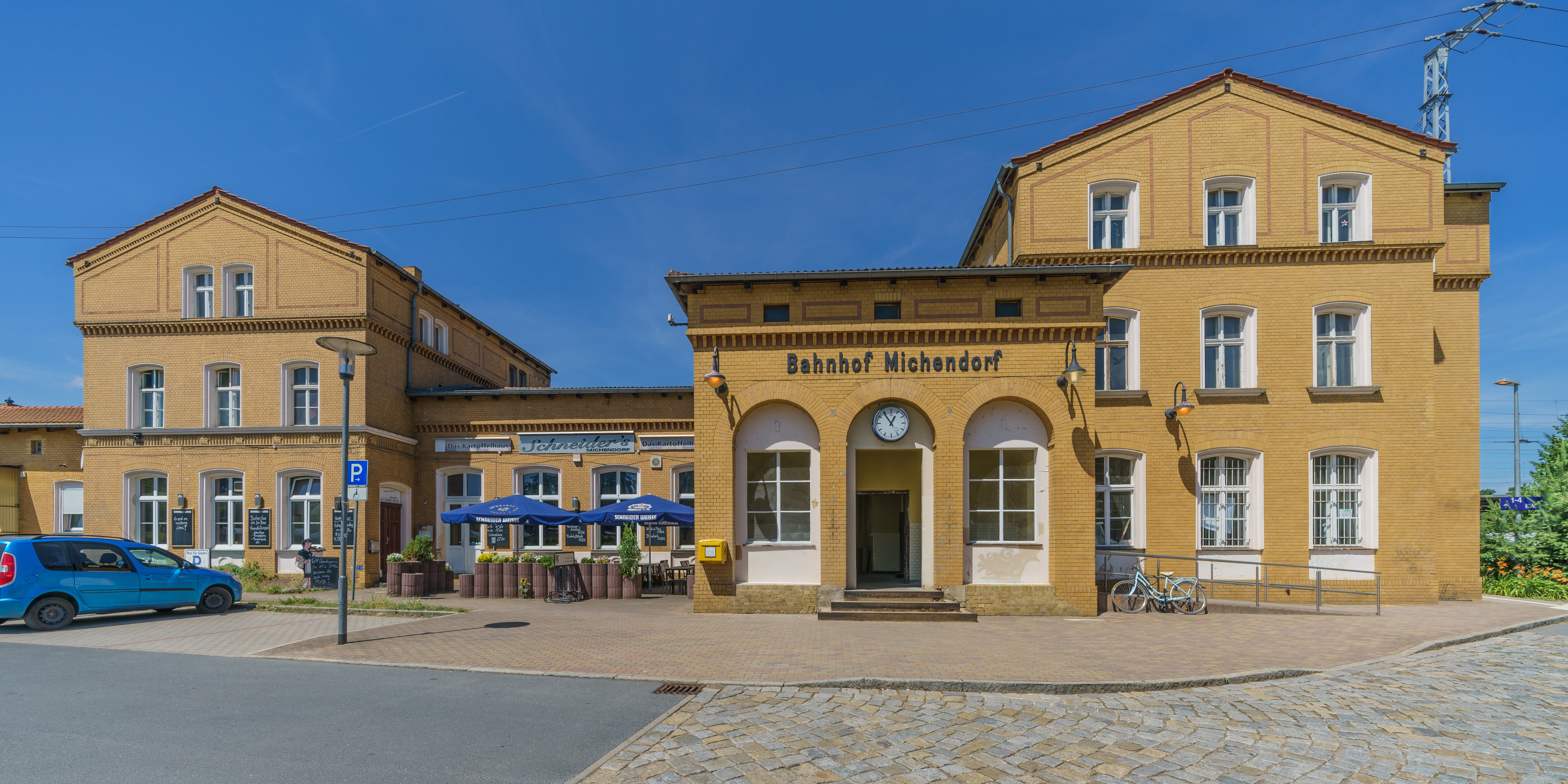
- 2018

General information
- Location: Am Bahnhof 1; 14552 Michendorf; Brandenburg; Germany
- Coordinates: 52.3164°N 13.0312°E
- Owner: DB Netz
- Operator: DB Station&Service
- Lines: Berlin-Blankenheim railway Michendorf–Großbeeren railway
- Train operators: DB Regio Nordost; Ostdeutsche Eisenbahn

Other information
- Station code: 4099
- DS100 code: BMIP
- IBNR: 8010233
- Category: 4
- Fare zone: VBB: Berlin C and Potsdam C/5950
- Website: www.bahnhof.de

History
- Opened: 15 May 1879; 147 years ago

Services
Preceding station	DB Regio Nordost	Following station
Seddin towards Dessau Hbf	RE 7	Wilhelmshorst towards Senftenberg
Preceding station	Ostdeutsche Eisenbahn	Following station
Wilhelmshorst towards Berlin-Wannsee	RB 37	Beelitz Stadt Terminus
Location
- Location within Brandenburg Location within Germany Location within Europe

Michendorf station is a railway station in the municipality of Michendorf, located in the Potsdam-Mittelmark district of Brandenburg, Germany.

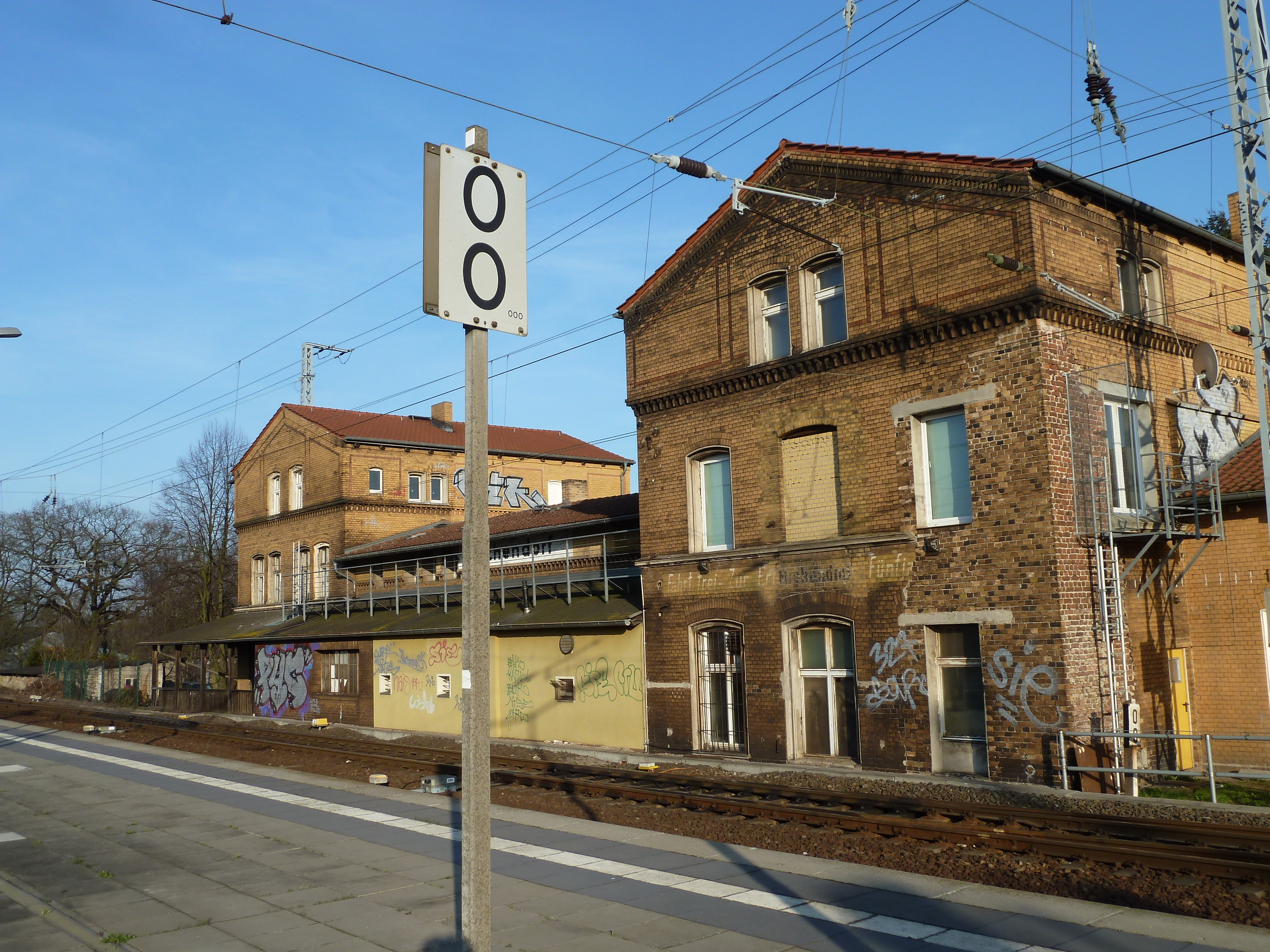
Beginning of the Michendorf–Großbeeren railway line in Michendorf station (2012).

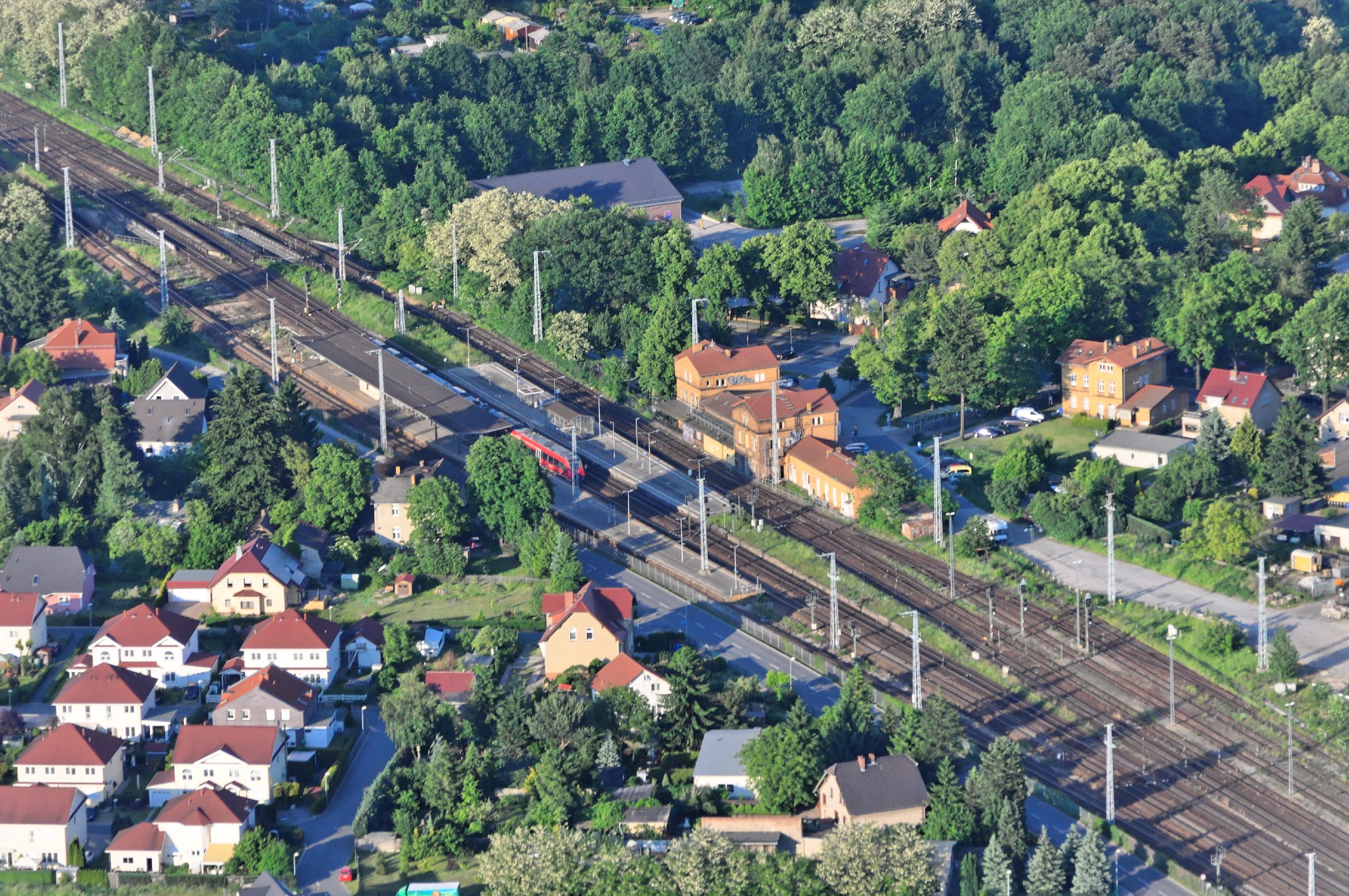
Michendorf station from the air (2013).
