= Bernhard Seeger =

German author

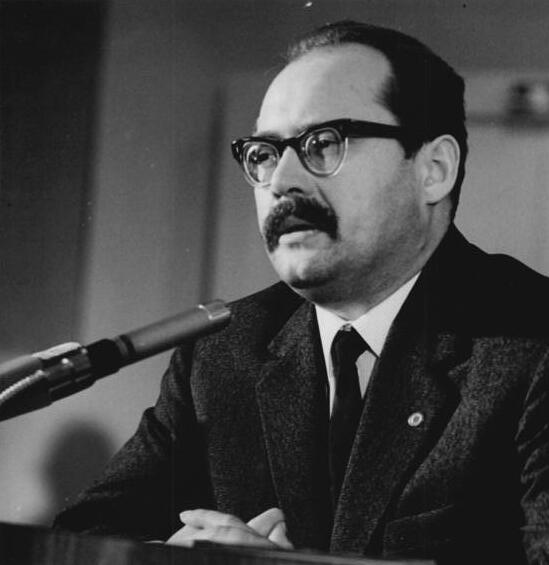
Bernhard Seeger (1966).

Bernhard Seeger (October 6, 1927 – March 14, 1999) was a German author.

== Life ==
Bernhard Seeger was born to a locksmith in Roßlau. He attended the gymnasium and then a teaching education school in Köthen. In 1944, he joined the Nazi Party. After doing his Reichsarbeitsdienst in Zerbst, he participated in World War II as a soldier in the Wehrmacht in 1944/45. He was imprisoned in a Soviet prisoner of war camp from May through December 1945.

After his return from the prison, Seeger completed a course for New Teachers. In 1946, he joined the SED and the Freie Deutsche Jugend. Between 1946 and 1952, he worked as a teacher in a village school. He was a literary editor at the Verlag Neues Leben in 1952/53 then a freelance writer in Stücken district of Michendorf near Potsdam. In 1954/55, he was a reporter in Vietnam then he was department manager to the secretary of the Schriftstellerverband of East Germany. He became a writer again in 1957.

In 1967, Seeger was incapable of writing for a long time because of a difficult accident. Since he already belonged to the SED's Bezirk of Potsdam leadership since 1964, he was a member of the SED's Central Committee from 1967. Between 1953 and 1972, he was an unofficial informer of the East German Stasi.

Bernhard Seeger wrote reportages, narratives, novels and poems though best known for his radio and televised dramas. Seeger's party politic works dealt with the prominent problems of the building phase of the East German society, that of the East German critic highly praised work"Herbstrauch" about the collective farming of the East German agriculture in 1959/60 had strong influence of Sholokhov's "New Land under the Plough".

Bernhard Seeger belonged to the Schriftstellerverband of East Germany since 1952 and the Academy of Arts, Berlin between 1969 and 1991. He won the following awards: the 1956 Theodor Fontane Prize of the Bezirk Potsdam, the 1960 Erich Weinert Medal, the 1962 Heinrich Mann Prize and Literature Prize of the Free German Trade Union Federation (FDGB), the 1963 and 1967 National Prize of East Germany, the 1968 Johannes R. Becher Medal, the 1969 Order of the Banner of Labor, the 1981 and 1983 Art Prize of the FDGB, the 1983 Vaterländischer Verdienstorden of East Germany as well as the 1987 Order of Karl Marx.

== Works ==
- Eisenhüttenkombinat Ost, Berlin 1952
- Millionenreich und Hellerstück, Berlin 1956
- Sturm aus Bambushütten, Berlin 1956
- Wo der Habicht schießt, Halle (Saale) 1957
- Wie Jasgulla zu seinem Recht kam, Leipzig 1960
- Herbstrauch, Halle (Saale) 1961
- Hannes Trostberg. Die Erben des Manifests, Halle (Saale) 1968
- Vater Batti singt wieder, Halle (S.) 1972
- Menschenwege, Halle (Saale)
  - 1 (1974)
  - 2 (1987)
- Der Harmonikaspieler, Halle [u.a.] 1981
- Frühe Wege, Leipzig 1987
