= Michendorf =

- Municipality
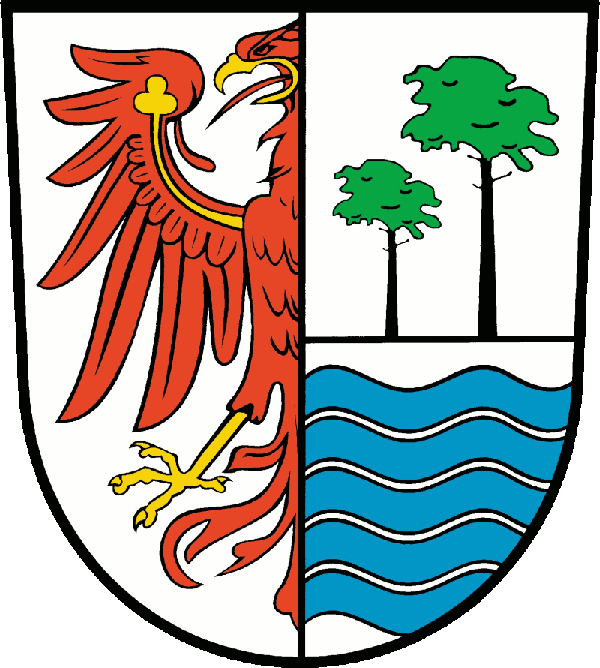
- Coat of arms

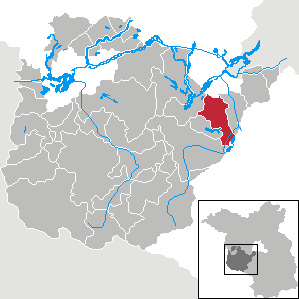
- Location of Michendorf within Potsdam-Mittelmark district
- Interactive map of Michendorf
- Location within Germany Location within Brandenburg
- Coordinates: 52°18′N 13°01′E
- Country: Germany
- State: Brandenburg
- District: Potsdam-Mittelmark
- Subdivisions: 6 Ortsteile

Government
  - Mayor (2019–27): Claudia Nowka

Area
  - Total: 68.51 km^{2} (26.45 sq mi)
- Elevation: 45 m (148 ft)

Population (2025-12-31)
  - Total: 13,769
  - Density: 201.0/km^{2} (520.5/sq mi)
- Time zone: UTC+01:00 (CET)
  - Summer (DST): UTC+02:00 (CEST)
- Postal codes: 14552
- Dialling codes: 033205
- Vehicle registration: PM
- Website: www.michendorf.de

Michendorf is a municipality in the Potsdam-Mittelmark district, in Brandenburg, Germany.

== Geography ==
Michendorf lies in a vast wooded area about nine kilometers south of Potsdam. The civil parishes ("Ortsteile") Fresdorf, Stücken and Wildenbruch lie in the Nature-Park Nuthe-Nieplitz. In the south the town adjacent to the Great Seddiner Lake and to the west by the Lienewitzer lakes.

The municipality is composed by Michendorf itself and fivecivil parishes. Population statistics are as of December 31, 2011:

- Fresdorf (293)
- Langerwisch (1,823)
- Michendorf (4,237)
- Stücken (492)
- Wildenbruch (1,845)
- Wilhelmshorst (3,103)

== Demography ==
Development of population since 1875 within the current Boundaries (Blue Line: Population; Dotted Line: Comparison to Population development in Brandenburg state; Grey Background: Time of Nazi Germany; Red Background: Time of communist East Germany)

Recent Population Development and Projections (Population Development before Census 2011 (blue line); Recent Population Development according to the Census in Germany in 2011 (blue bordered line); Official projections for 2005-2030 (yellow line); for 2017-2030 (scarlet line); for 2020-2030 (green line)

Michendorf: Population development
within the current boundaries (2020)

Year	Pop.	±% p.a.
1875	1,766	—
1890	2,039	+0.96%
1910	2,739	+1.49%
1925	3,720	+2.06%
1939	7,104	+4.73%
1950	8,572	+1.72%
1964	8,313	−0.22%

Year	Pop.	±% p.a.
1971	8,372	+0.10%
1981	7,742	−0.78%
1985	7,598	−0.47%
1990	7,419	−0.48%
1995	7,751	+0.88%
2000	10,233	+5.71%
2005	11,163	+1.75%

Year	Pop.	±% p.a.
2010	11,805	+1.12%
2015	12,178	+0.62%
2016	12,271	+0.76%
2017	12,437	+1.35%
2018	12,726	+2.32%
2019	13,134	+3.21%
2020	13,278	+1.10%

== History ==
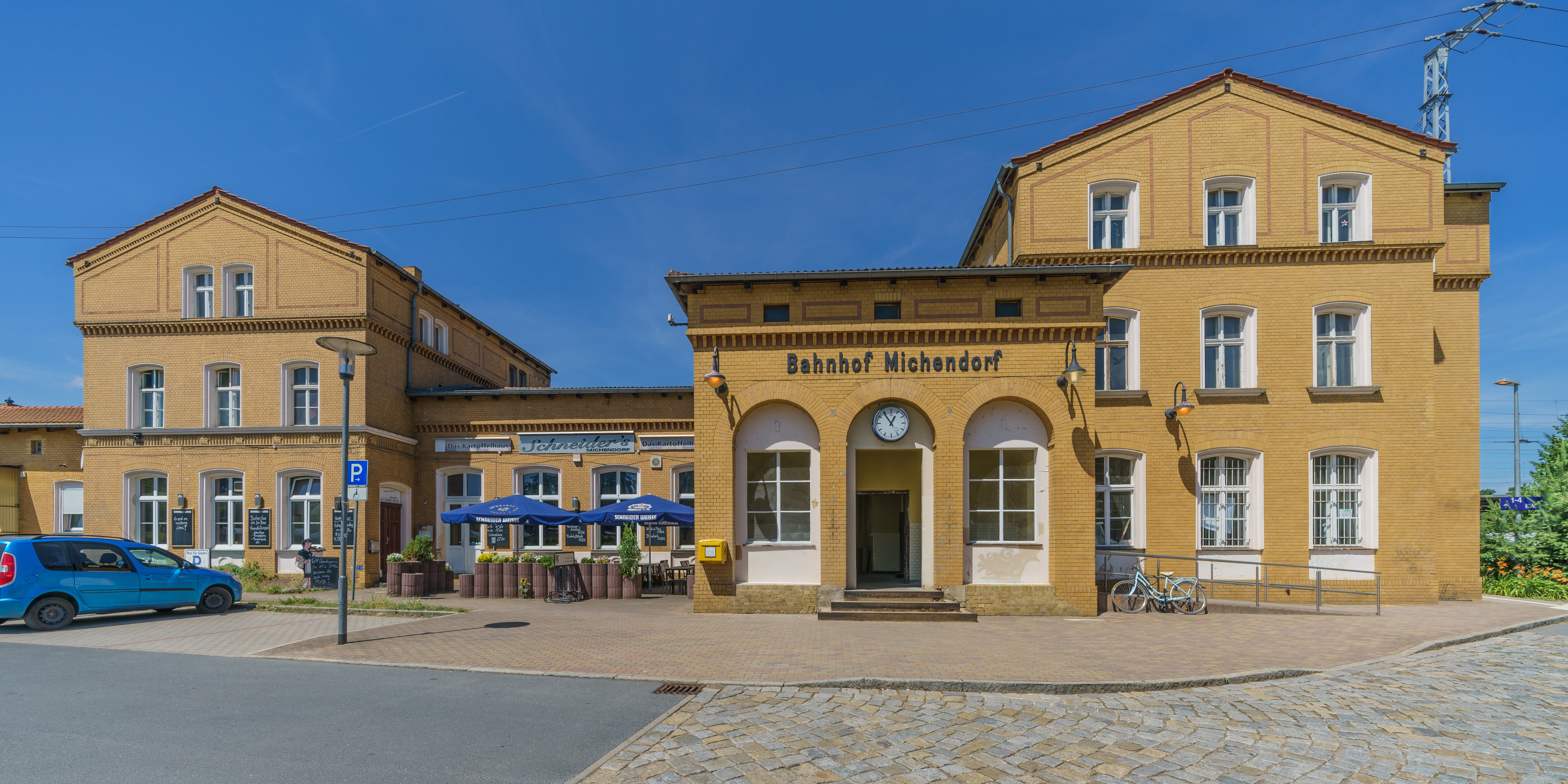
Michendorf railway station, probably opened in 1879

During the Division of Germany (1945–90), Michendorf was in East Germany, although only a few kilometers from West Berlin. The Michendorf rest stop was the last stop in East Germany for travelers driving into West Berlin, and a popular spot for East and West Germans to meet up with friends and family who lived on the other side of the Berlin Wall. Despite efforts by the Michendorf historical society, the rest stop was demolished in 2008.

== Notable residents ==
- Otto Böckel (1859–1923), politician notorious for exploiting anti-Semitism as a political issue, died in Michendorf.
- Karin Hübner (1936–2006), actress who grew up in Michendorf.
- Gerit Kling (born 1965), actress who grew up in Michendorf.
- Kurt Kreuger (1916–2006), actor, was born in Michendorf, although he grew up in Switzerland.
- Bernhard Seeger (1927–1999), author, lived and worked in Michendorf.

== See also ==
- Michendorf–Großbeeren railway
