= Beelitz Stadt station =

Train station in Potsdam-Mittelmark, Brandenburg, Germany

Beelitz Stadt
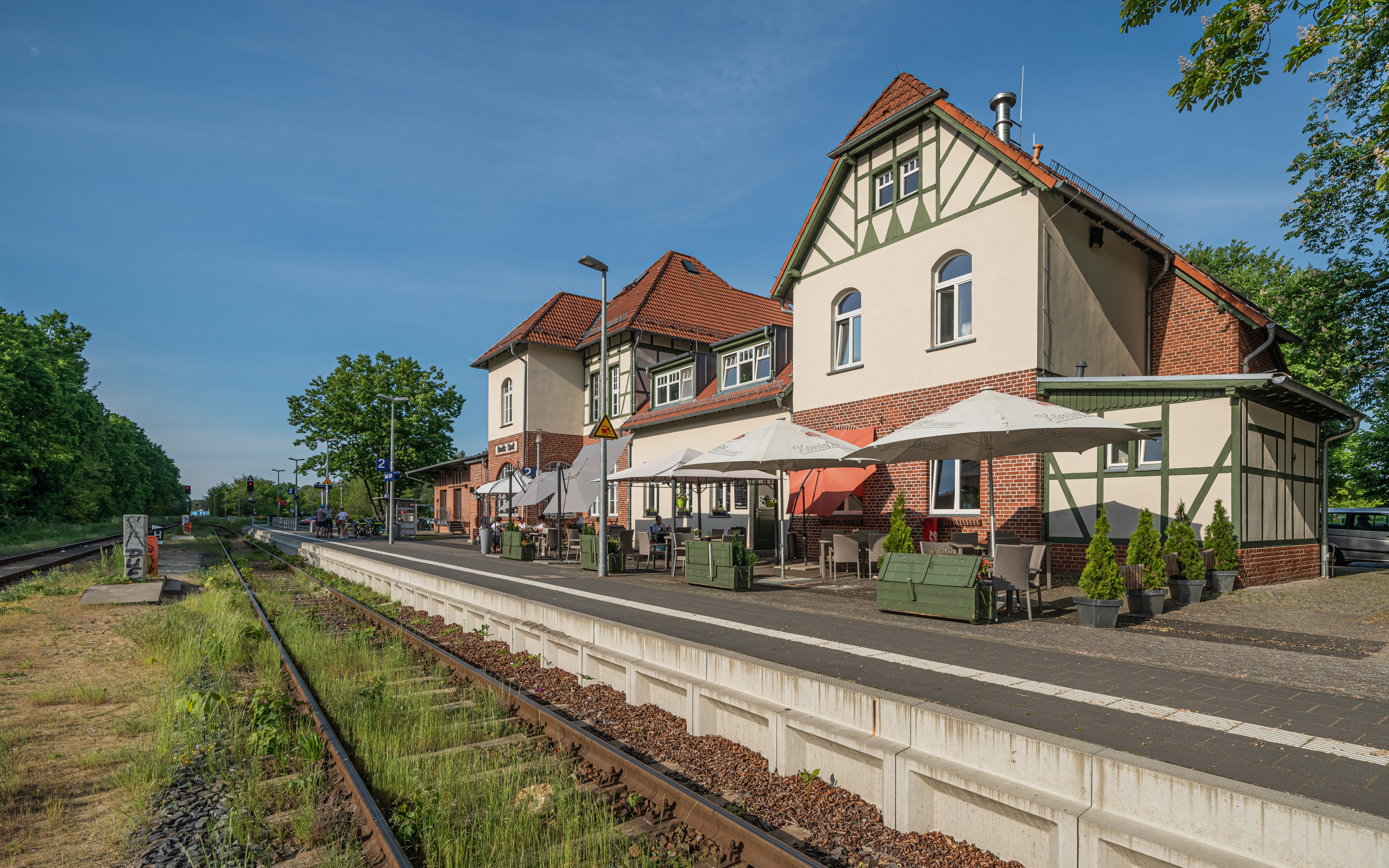
- 2021

General information
- Location: Bahnhofstraße 9; 14547 Beelitz; Brandenburg; Germany
- Coordinates: 52°14′25″N 12°58′02″E
- Owner: DB Netz
- Operator: DB Station&Service
- Line: Jüterbog–Nauen railway
- Train operators: Ostdeutsche Eisenbahn

Other information
- Station code: 451
- DS100 code: BBZS
- IBNR: 8013468
- Category: 6
- Fare zone: : 6149
- Website: www.bahnhof.de

History
- Opened: 1 October 1904; 121 years ago

Services
Preceding station	Ostdeutsche Eisenbahn	Following station
Ferch-Lienewitz towards Potsdam Hbf	RB 33	Terminus
Michendorf towards Berlin-Wannsee	RB 37	Elsholz towards Jüterbog
Location
- Location within Brandenburg

Beelitz Stadt station is a railway station in the town of Beelitz located in the district of Potsdam-Mittelmark, Brandenburg, Germany.

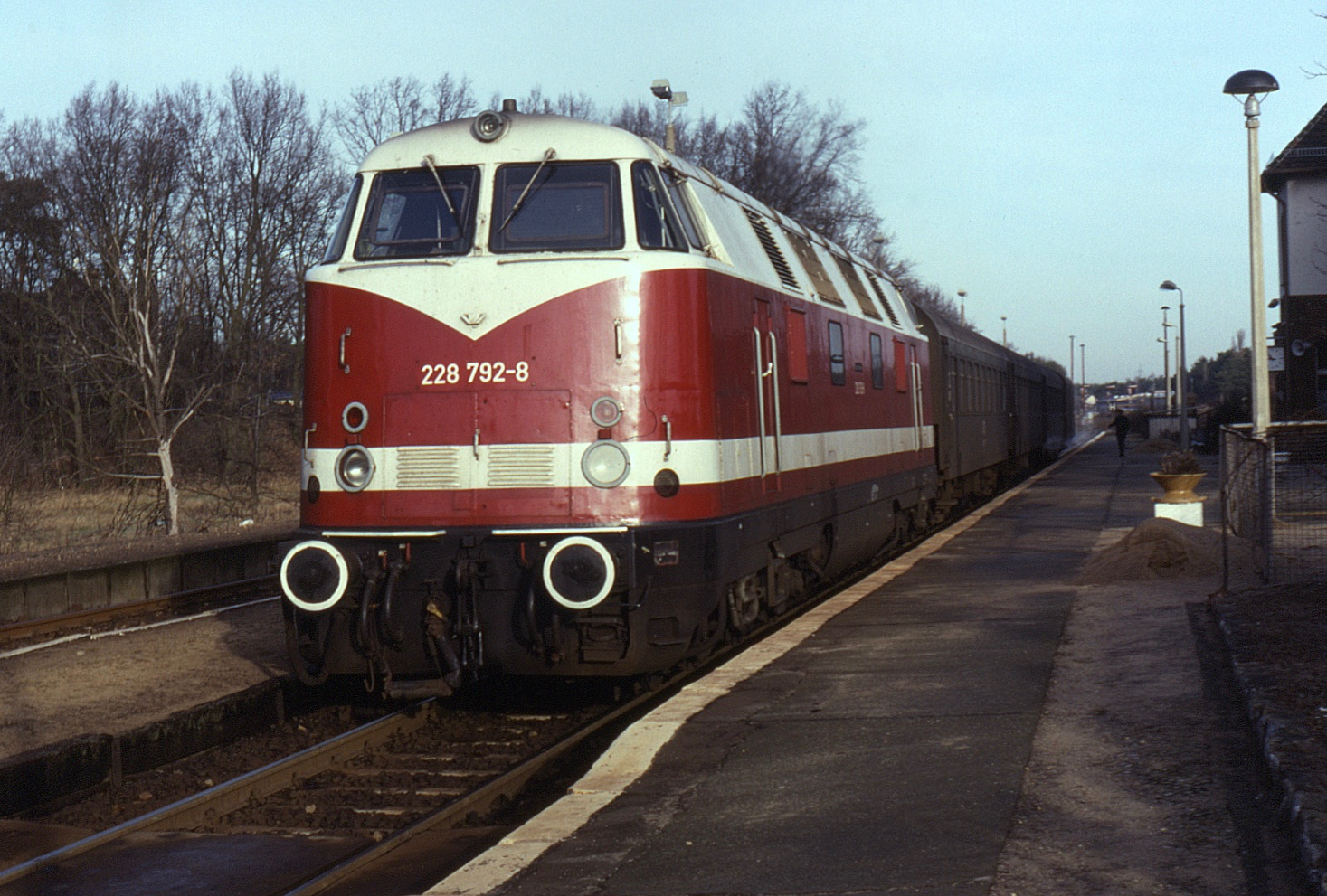
Beelitz Stadt station in January 1993.
