= Dormitory =

Residential student building

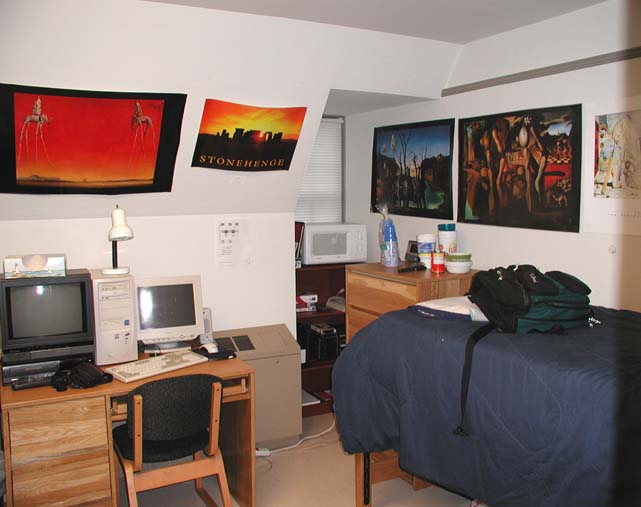
An American college dormitory room in 2002

A dormitory (originated from the Latin word dormitorium, often abbreviated to dorm,) is a room that sleeps multiple people. It may also refer (in the United States) to a building primarily providing sleeping and residential quarters for large numbers of people such as student accommodation for university or college students, or, with reference to military personnel, a barracks.

A building providing sleeping and residential quarters for large numbers of people may also be called a house (members of a religious community or pupils at a boarding school), or a hostel (students, workers or travelers).

== Types of dormitory ==
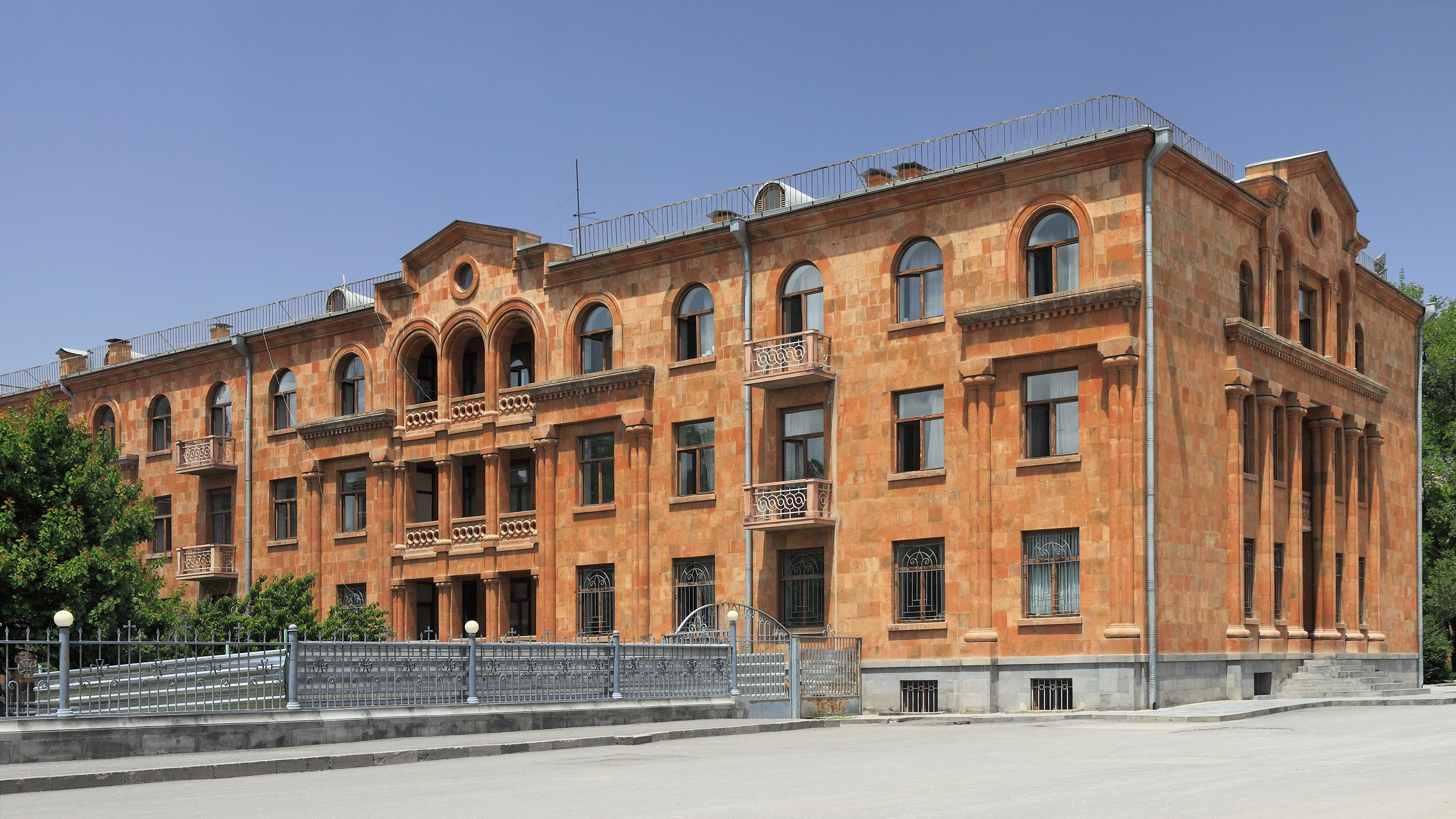
A seminary dormitory in Vagharshapat, Armavir Province, Armenia

=== Barracks ===
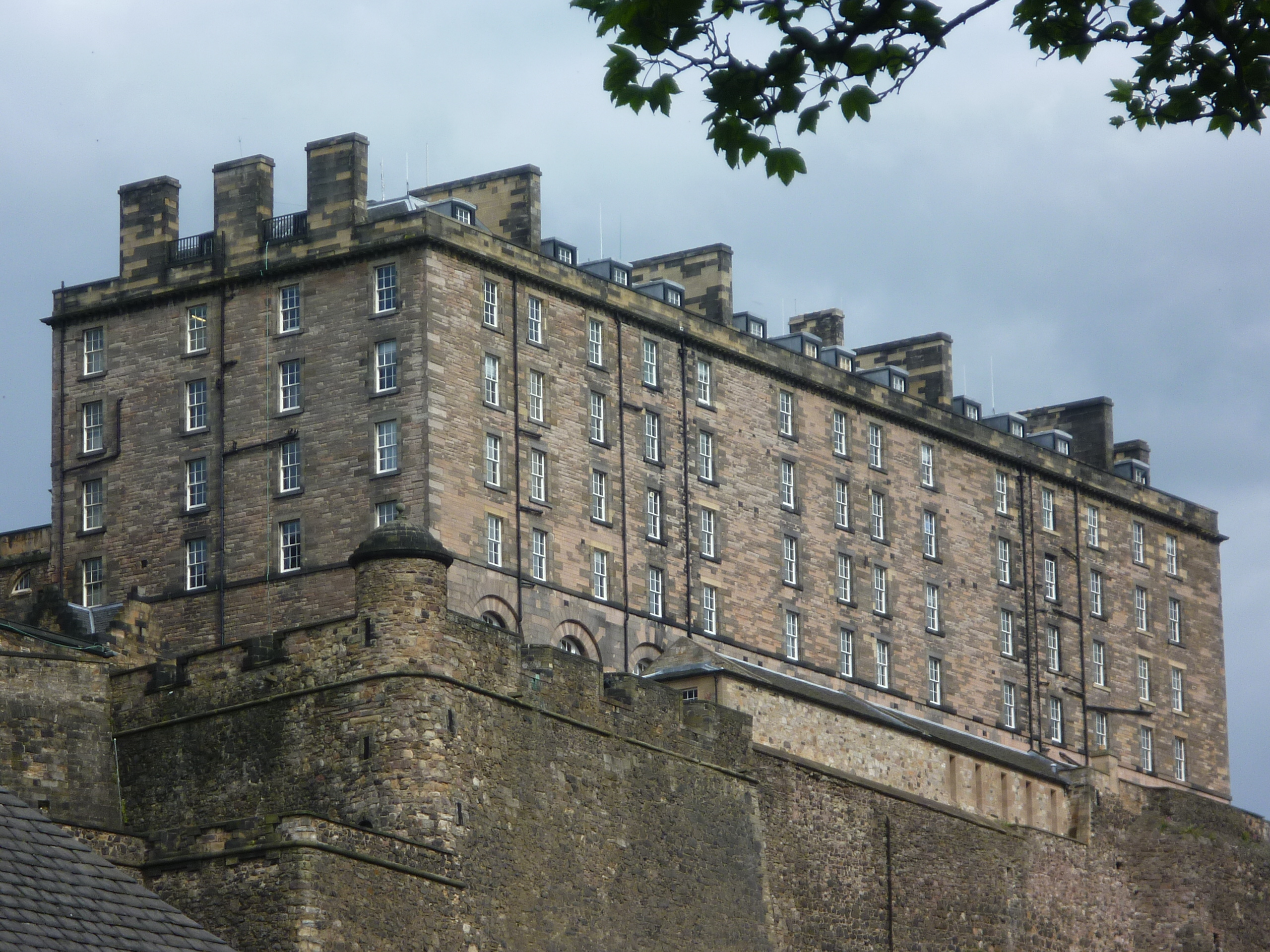
Late 18th century barracks from the reign of George III, Edinburgh Castle, Scotland

Barracks are buildings used to accommodate military personnel and quasi-military personnel such as police. The English word originates from the 17th century via French and Italian from an old Spanish word barraca 'soldier's tent', but today barracks are usually permanent buildings. The word may apply to separate housing blocks or to complete complexes, and the plural form often refers to a single structure and may be singular in construction.

The main objective of barracks is to separate soldiers from the civilian population and reinforce discipline, training, and esprit de corps. They have been called "discipline factories for soldiers". Like industrial factories, some are considered to be shoddy or dull buildings, although others are known for their magnificent architecture such as Collins Barracks in Dublin and others in Paris, Berlin, Madrid, Vienna, or London. From the rough barracks of 19th-century conscript armies, filled with hazing and illness and barely differentiated from the livestock pens that housed the draft animals, to the clean and Internet-connected barracks of modern all-volunteer militaries, the word can have a variety of connotations.

=== Boarding school dormitories ===
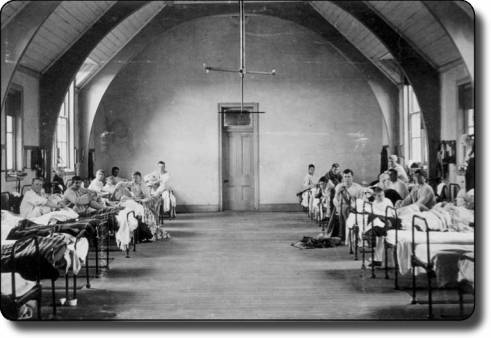
Dormitory at The Armidale School, New South Wales, 1898

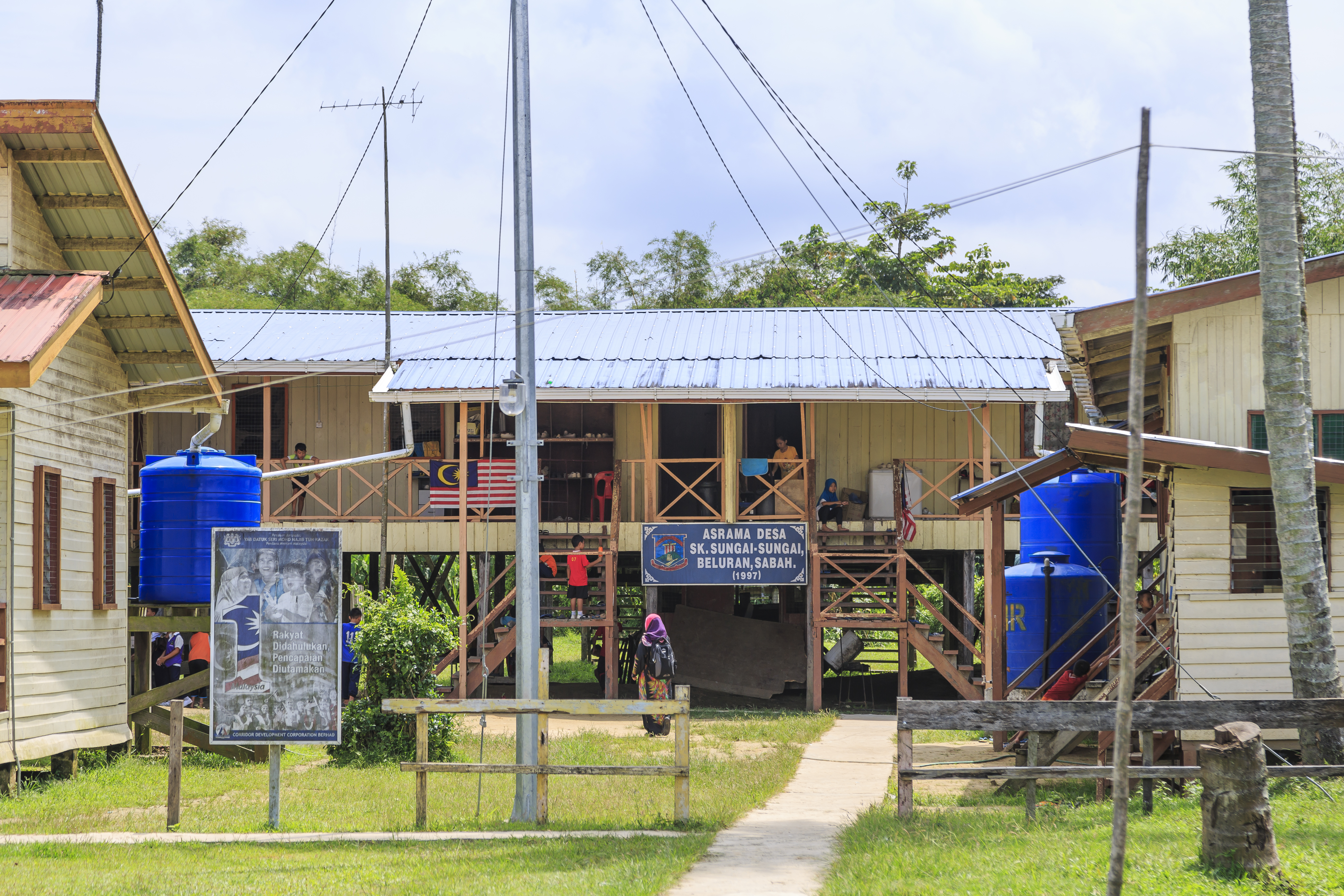
High school dormitory in Sabah, Malaysia

Boarding schools generally have dormitories (in the sense of a shared room for multiple people) for at least junior or younger children around age 4 to 9 years of age. In classic British boarding schools these typically have bunk beds that have traditionally come to be associated with boarding schools. The Department for Children, Schools and Families, in conjunction with the Department of Health of the United Kingdom, has prescribed guidelines for dormitories in boarding schools. These regulations come under what is called as the National Boarding Standards.

The National Boarding Standards in the UK have prescribed a minimum floor area or living space required for each student and other aspects of basic facilities. The minimum floor area of a dormitory accommodating two or more students is defined as the number of students sleeping in the dormitory multiplied by 4.2 m^{2}, plus 1.2 m^{2}. A minimum distance of 0.9 m should also be maintained between any two beds in a dormitory, bedroom or cubicle. If students have individual sleeping cubicles, each student must be provided with a window and a minimum floor area of 5.0 m^{2}. A bedroom for a single student should have a floor area of at least 6.0 m^{2} and have a window. Sleeping accommodation should be separated by age group and gender. Dormitories should also provide a shower or bath for each ten students and a toilet or urinal for each five students.

=== Cold-air dormitories ===
Cold-air dormitories (CADs) are found in multi-level rooming houses such as fraternities, sororities, and cooperative houses. In CADs and in hostels, the room typically has very few furnishings except for beds. Such rooms can contain anywhere from three to 50 beds (though such very large dormitories are rare except perhaps as military barracks). Such rooms provide little or no privacy for the residents, and very limited storage for personal items in or near the beds. Cold-air dorms get their names from the common practice of keeping the windows open year-round, even in winter. The practice emerged based on the theory that circulation and cold air minimizes the spread of disease. Some communal bedrooms keep the name cold-air dorms or cold dorms despite having modern heating or cooling.

=== Dormitory ship ===
A dormitory ship is a vessel whose primary function is to serve as floating living quarters. Such craft serve as conventional land-based dormitories in all respects except that the living quarters are aboard a floating vessel, most often moored in place near its host facility. It may be seaworthy or not.

=== Prison dormitories ===
Housing units in prisons that house multiple inmates in a single large room are referred to as "dormitories". This style of housing is generally used in the US at low security federal prisons. These rooms normally house 50 to 100 prisoners in bunk beds.

=== Student accommodation ===
Student accommodation is a building or buildings used to house students, particularly in higher education. These are known by different names around the world, such as halls of residence, residence halls, accommodation blocks (particularly within residential colleges) or student hostels. Student accommodation may be managed by educational institutions, religious bodies or other charities, student associations, private companies, or agencies of local or national governments.

== See also ==
- Barracks
- Hostel
- List of dormitory buildings
- Public housing
- Residential college
- Student Village (disambiguation)
