= Student Village =

Student Village is a term often used by colleges and universities to describe residential areas on campus and may refer to:

- Student Village (Victoria University)
- John Hancock Student Village at Boston University
- Turku Student Village in Finland
- Cheney Student Village at Oxford Brookes University
- Manchester Student Village in Manchester, England
- Hendrefoilan Student Village in Swansea, Wales
- Schlachtensee Student Village in Berlin
- Studentendorf Adlershof in Berlin
- Student Village (Minsk), Belarusian State University
