= Studentendorf Schlachtensee =

Schlachtensee Student Village Studentendorf Schlachtensee
- Student village
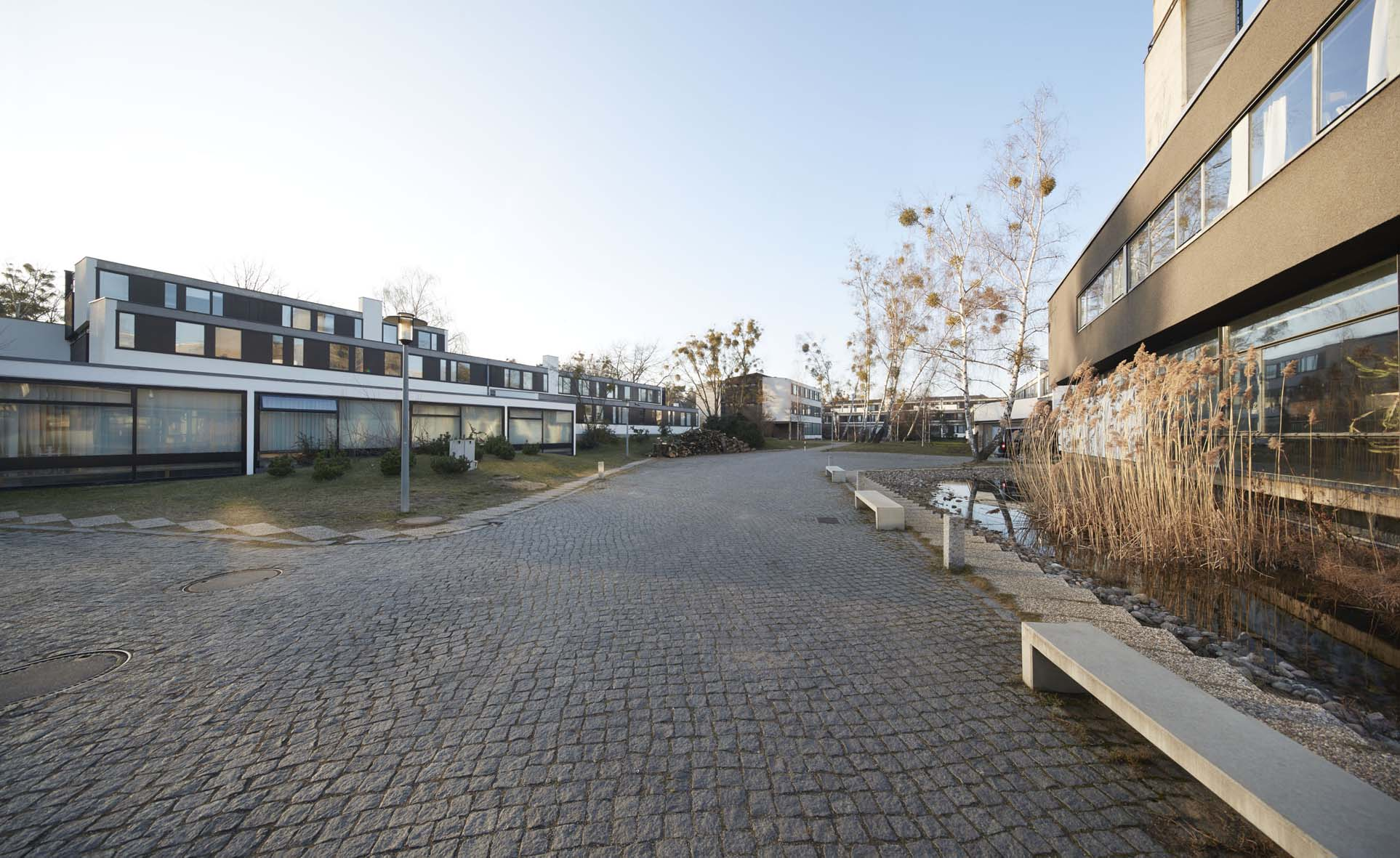
- Interactive map of Schlachtensee Student Village
- Coordinates: 52°25′44″N 13°12′56″E
- Country: Germany
- State: Berlin
- Established: 1959
- Founder: Freie Universität Berlin
- Named for: Schlachtensee (lake)

Population
  - Estimate: appr. 900
- Website: www.studentendorf.berlin

The Studentendorf (student village) Schlachtensee is a heritage listed building complex of residential and community buildings in Berlin, Germany. It was built in the 1950s and was planned as a residence for students of the Free University of Berlin. Based on the model of the Studentendorf Schlachtensee, the Studentendorf Adlershof opened in October 2014 on the campus of Humboldt University in Berlin's Adlershof district.

== Location ==
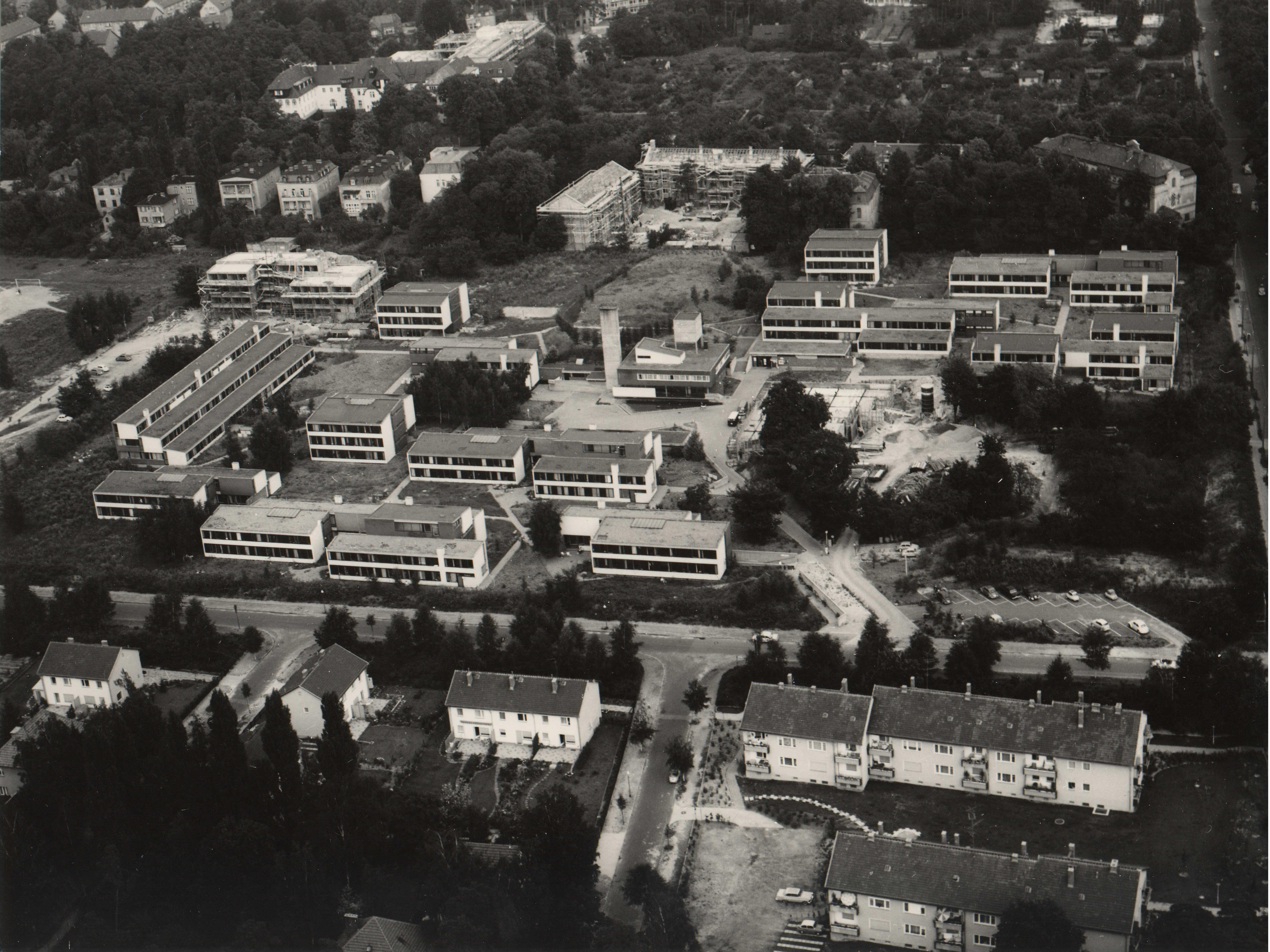
Aerial picture Studentendorf Schlachtensee, 1963

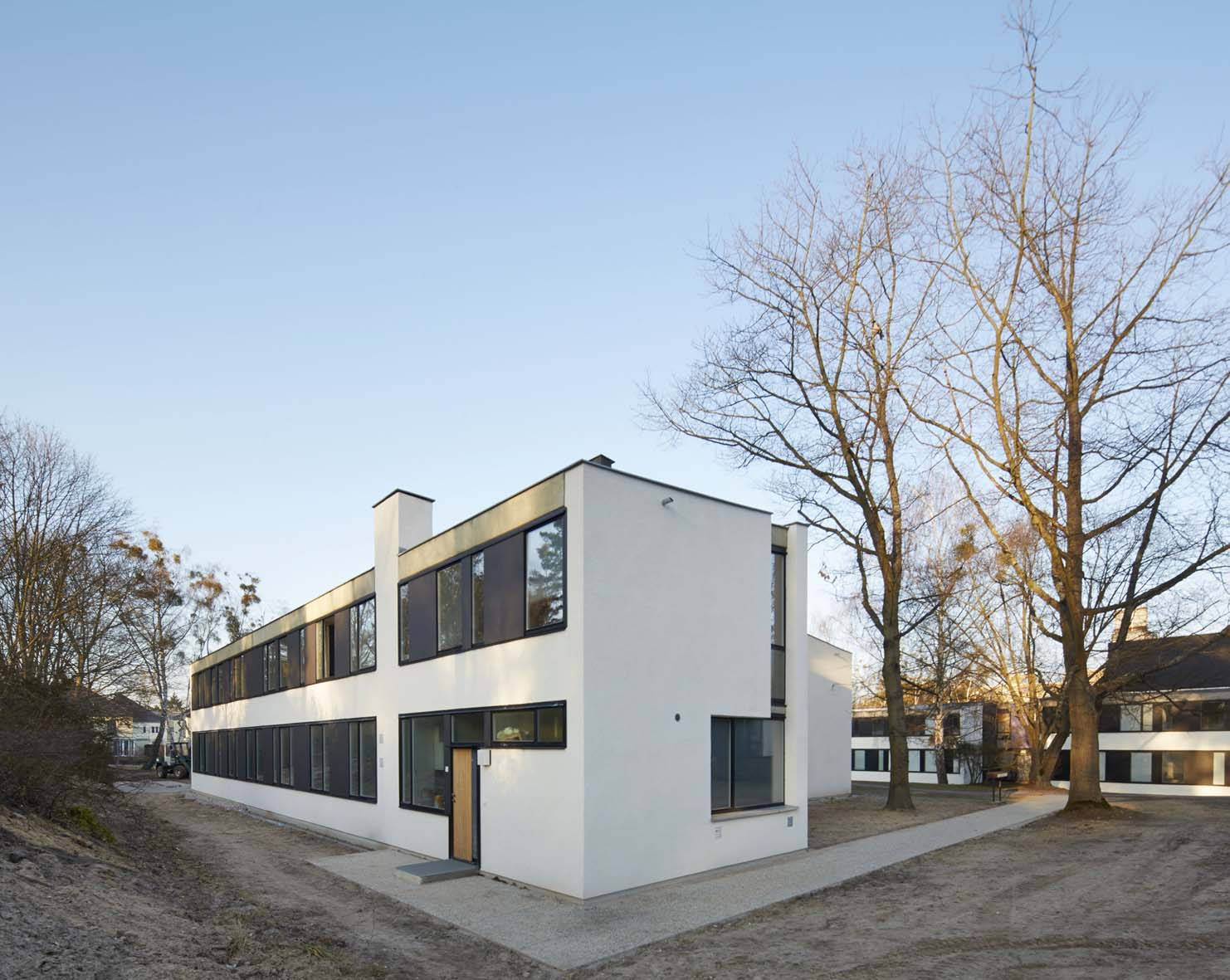
Studentendorf Schlachtensee, Berlin, House 5

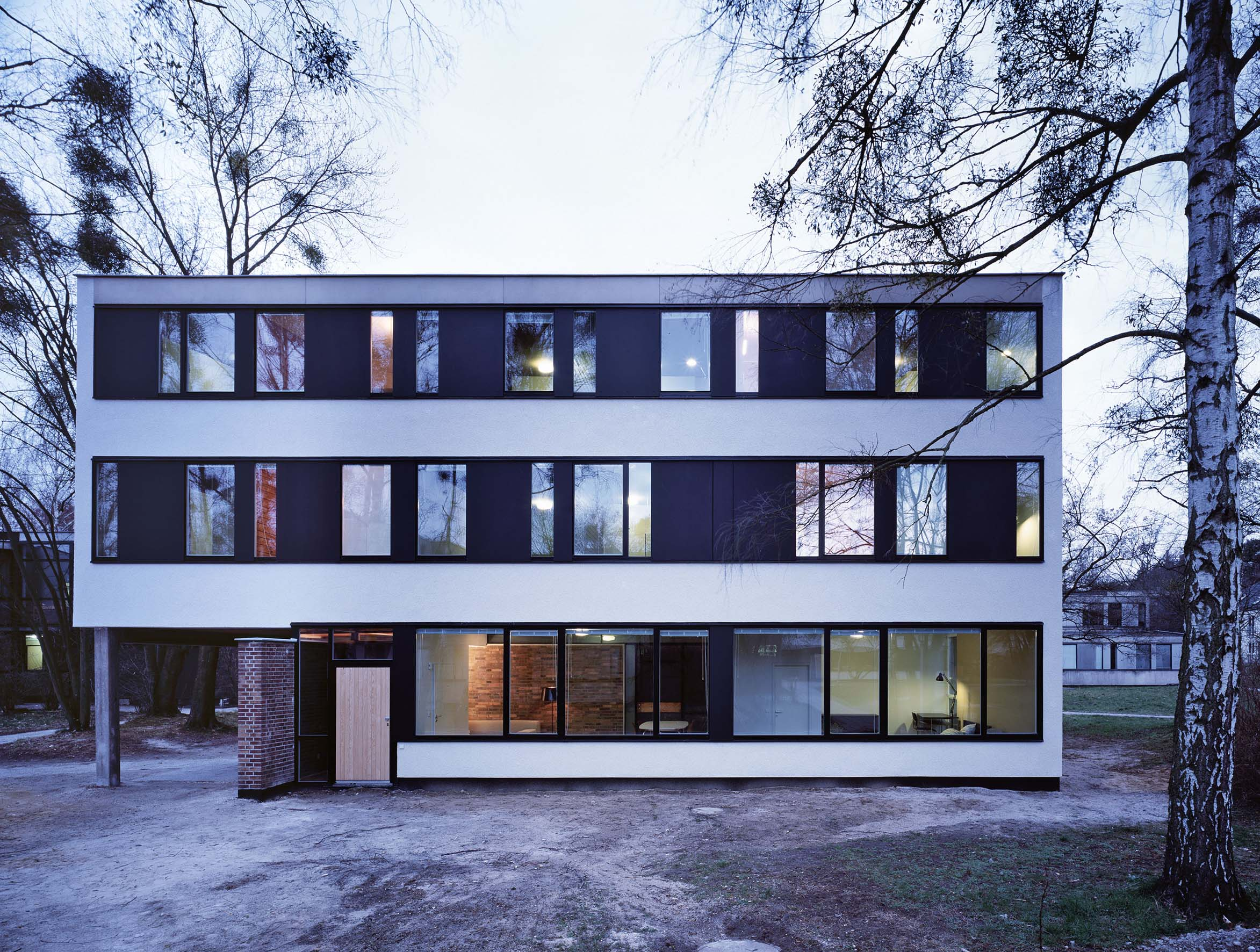
Studentendorf Schlachtensee, Berlin, House 4

The Studentendorf Schlachtensee is located in the southwest of Berlin, in Steglitz-Zehlendorf, in the neighbourhood of [Nikolassee]. The heritage listed part of the student village was built between 1959 and 1964, and financed by a donation from the Government of the United States of America. The Student Village Schlachtensee was the first newly built academic residential complex of post-war Berlin.

== History ==
The Studentendorf Schlachtensee is one of the most important architectural contributions of the Americans to the re-education of the Germans after losing World War II. The aim was to support the education of young people and transform them into citizens of a democratic Germany. The architecture itself was also intended to support the process of overcoming totalitarianism. It was envisaged that the future academic elite of the Federal Republic of Germany would find a home as well as political and democratic education in Schlachtensee. The architecture and many institutions, such as the tutoring program, the village council, working groups established in the village library and other cultural institutions, were born out of this idea and were financed with the generous help of the US State Department. The monumental complex is considered the most important student village not only in Berlin, but European-wide.

== Architecture ==
The Studentendorf of the Freie Universität Berlin, which was its original name, is an ensemble of 28 loosely arranged houses composed as an urban landscape across 5 hectares. The Berlin-based architectural office Hermann Fehling, Daniel Gogel and Peter Pfankuch designed the buildings of the first and second building phase of the Studentenndorf. During the first phase, 1957-1959, 12 houses for men and six for women, the mayor's office, a shop, and the library were built. The second phase, 1962-1964, included the semi-detached house, the community centre and the no longer existing residence of the Academic Director.

All residential buildings – with the exception of the double house 12/13 – are one to three storeys and were created for residential groups of up to 30 students. The heritage-listed site of the first and second phases has been preserved almost entirely including the furniture. Between 1976 and 1978, four five-storey residential community houses were added by the architects Krämer, Pfennig, Sieverts & Partner in a third section.

All houses are grouped around a village square and form a unique ensemble of post-war modernism. At the village square the central buildings and the community center with an auditorium and cafeteria, now the Club A18, are found. The mayor's office with the technical centre is nowadays used as "town hall". The former shop is used as a kindergarten, and the former library, now used as a learning lounge, are located on the village square. The gym has moved into house 14. The Studentendorf is designed for community living: the rooms are rather small, but the light halls and stairways and large kitchens in the residential buildings offer space for encounters and meetings. With the extensions undertaken in 1977, the village can now accommodate more than 900 students.

In order to avoid monotony, the architects chose a mixture of housing types for the student accommodation: multi-storey cube-shaped houses, z-shaped houses, houses composed of angles and stand-alone houses. At the southern end, the architects placed the community house, whose expressive design makes it standing out from the other buildings.

== Architectural historical significance ==
The 18 residential buildings of the first phase of the Studentendorf can be divided into four basic types, A, B, C and N, as designated by the architects. The types are classified based on their organising principle on the inside. All houses consist of a hall in the center of the building – functioning as the communication center of the house – and individual residential areas. The size of the student rooms and furnishings are standardized across the campus. Each Bude (student room) is about ten square meters and is always equipped with a built-in wardrobe, a bed, a wall-mounted desk and a wall shelf which is connected to the outer Eternit panel. In most rooms, the walls are constructed out of wood. The colour scheme of the walls and ceilings as well as the arrangement of furnishings varies between rooms: a total of 36 furnishing variations were designed by the architects.

The individualised western-style community is expressed through the asymmetrical facades as well as the individualised colour and furnishing concepts. Therefore, while no resident has more space than another, their living area is clearly distinguished from the others. The idea of an individualised, self-conscious and non-conformist community is also supported by the architecture. Against this background, the Studentendorf Schlachtensee can be considered a built democracy.

On the outside, the residential buildings are characterised by a strict colour scheme, yet completely asymmetrical facade. In addition to the narrow steel window profiles and anthracite Eternit panels, the two-toned plaster structure is striking. The facades consist of a solid-coloured plaster, with white indicating the individual living areas and the black indicating the common areas. Rooms, halls, kitchens and corridors are fully glazed. The floor to ceiling glazing hallway support the principle of flowing spaces. In addition to the residential buildings of the first phase and the mayor's office, two small one-storey pavilions were built for communal facilities on the central village square. Glazed on three sides, a library was built opposite the mayor’s office. On the southern edge a shop was built. The students` initiative converted both buildings: the shop was turned into a kindergarten, and the library was transformed into a gym

The community center on the village square was realised in the second phase. In 1959 Fehling + Gogel replanned this building. The formerly cube-like construction was given a very expressive form with an overhanging roof and white plaster facade. This is vaguely reminiscent of the Berlin Philharmonie, for which the architect trio won the second prize after Hans Scharoun. The house initially contained a cafeteria and an auditorium for three hundred people. In the 1970s, Eternit panels were added to the facade for cosmetic reasons. As a full-time restaurant the cafeteria was not profitable, because the students used their small kitchens on the residential floor or had lunch at the university cafeteria. Since 1974, the Club A18 has been located on the premises of the former cafeteria.

The avant-garde aim of the Studentendorf Schlachtensee does not end with its buildings. The urban environment and landscaping are also incorporated into the design concept. The landscaped garden was designed by Hermann Mattern, who may well be considered one of the most important garden designers of the mid-20th century. In seemingly no particular order, the houses are grouped around the low-lying village square, which is the Agora of the Studentendorf, following the Greek model. Diagonal paths connect the houses to the central square, which is connected by a diagonal path to the neighbourhood. The village square is framed by central community buildings. The space sequences are not hierarchical, but seemingly randomly designed. Two original birch groves were integrated into the landscape garden and connect the place to its history.

The old fruit trees, which Fehling wanted to keep in his planning, were lost. Mattern’s design concept for Studentendorf Schlachtensee is no doubt based on Scharoun's model of the urban landscape. According to the art historian Andreas Butter, this is the "identification of a free, cooperative coexistence of people". According to Butter, in Schlachtensee the naturalistic and non-axial interior design developed by Scharoun has been implemented in an exemplary manner in line with the landscaping of the Enlightenment. "The English park is created, its paths guide so that the visitor has the freedom of choosing how to walk in it." At that time, this concept was primarily used in Sweden and was something entirely new for German landscape design; although the residents of the student village were not only enthusiastic about Mattern`s concept. The strong influence of Sharoun in interior design, but also in the architecture of the community house are not surprising to Butter "since all involved architects were strongly connected to him."

== Planned demolition and rescue of the monument ==
Despite having been recognised and listed as a historical monument since 1991, the Berlin Senate authorised the demolition of the Studentendorf in 2001. Only five of the original buildings were to remain and the land was to be sold. With the expected sale proceeds, a new building for the Berlinische Galerie was to be financed. Initiated by the Local Government and led by the architect Hardt-Walt Hämer a resistance developed among the current and former inhabitants. They founded an initiative that fought for the preservation of the site. With the decision in 2013 to sell the Student Village to the cooperative Studentendorf Schlachtensee eG, the demolition has been successfully averted. On June 16, 2004 the Berlin House of Representatives agreed after long negotiations on the sale. Since then, the cooperative has operated the Student Village and renovated one house after the other. Since 2005, the art association Künstlerhaus 19 has rented house 19.

In February 2006, the Federal Republic of Germany classified the Studentendorf Schlachtensee a "cultural monument of national importance" and promoted its structural renewal. Partners and sponsors of the renovation include the Deutsche Stiftung Denkmalschutz, the Becksche Stiftung, Berlin and Free University Berlin.

== Sale of the land ==
In June 2010, the cooperative sold the property to the Swiss pension fund CoOpera Sammelstiftung PUK and signed a rental agreement for a period of 99 years.

== Renewal of monument ==
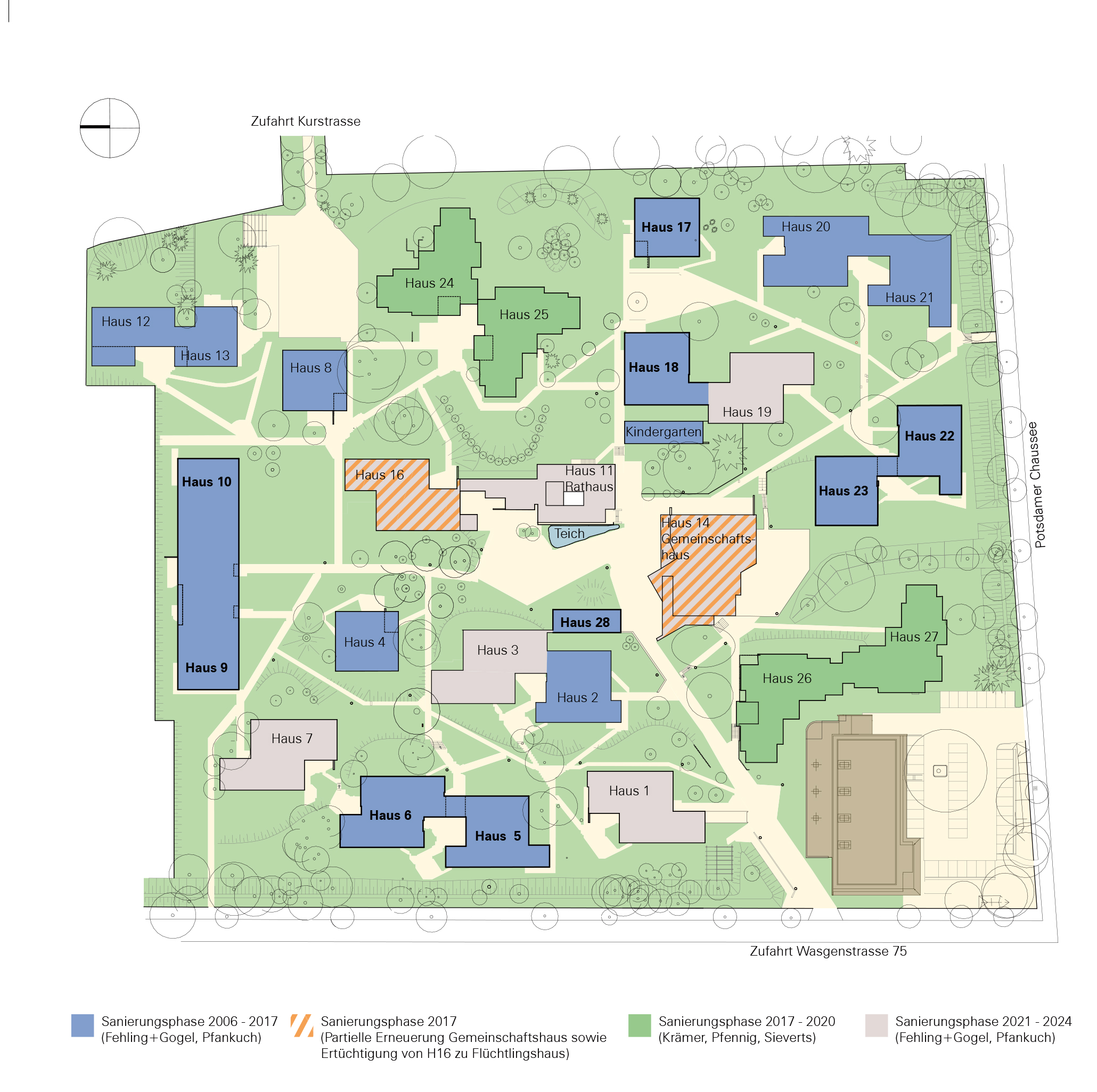
Renewal Plan Studentendorf Schlachtensee

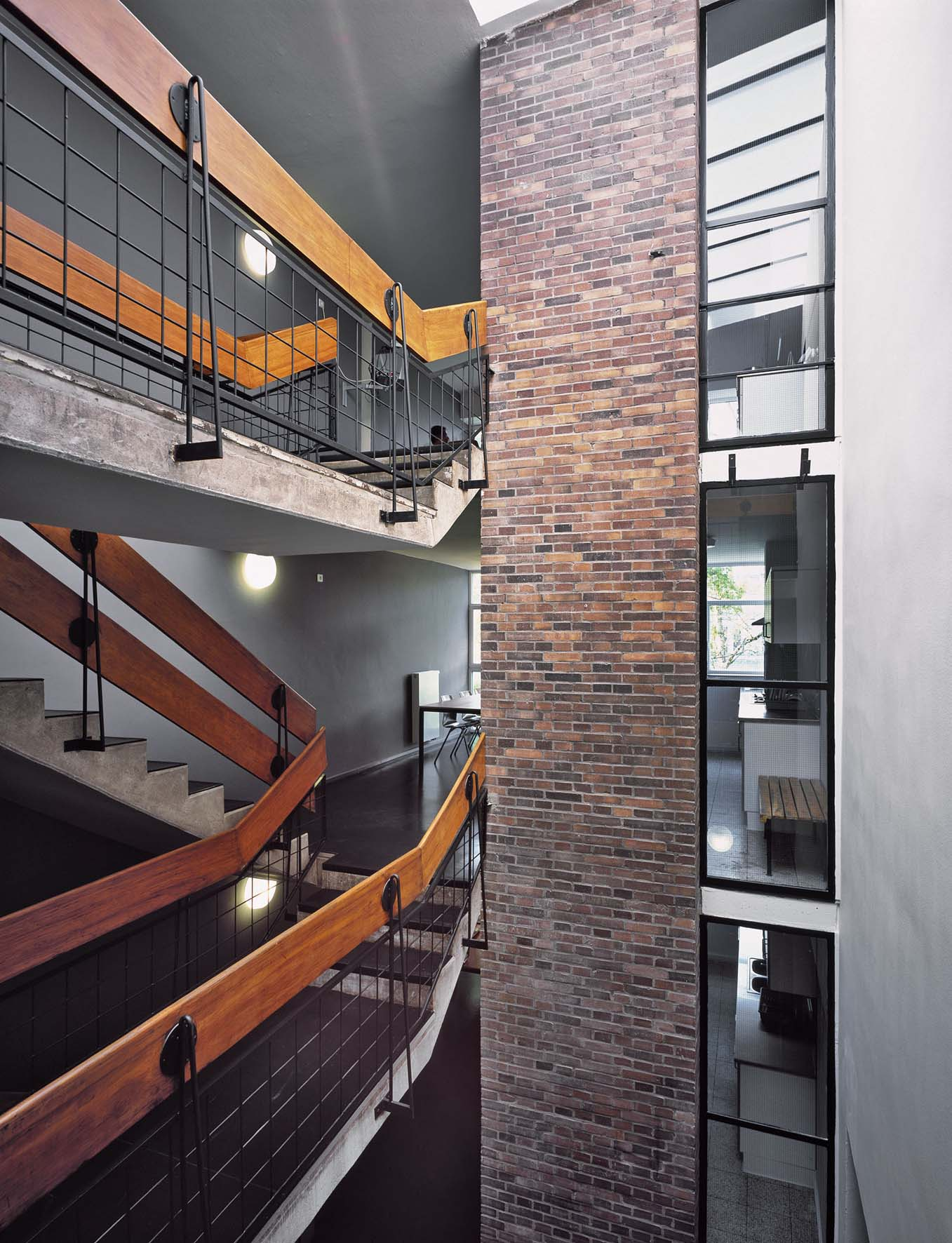
Studentendorf Schlachtensee, Berlin, House 4

In 2006 the renovation of the buildings began. The renovation of houses 4 and 8 was completed in 2009, and on 19 March 2009, the buildings were returned to the students of the Free University Berlin. The rooms were enlarged, bathrooms were installed and the houses made more energy efficient. Between 2010 and 2011 the renovation of the houses 20 and 21 and the kindergarten in house 15 were carried out. From 2012 to 2013, houses 5, 18 and 6 were renewed by the architects Brenne. In 2014, the renovation of the houses 9, 10, 22 and 23 began, its completion was finished in October 2015. The former library on the village square was renewed in 2014.

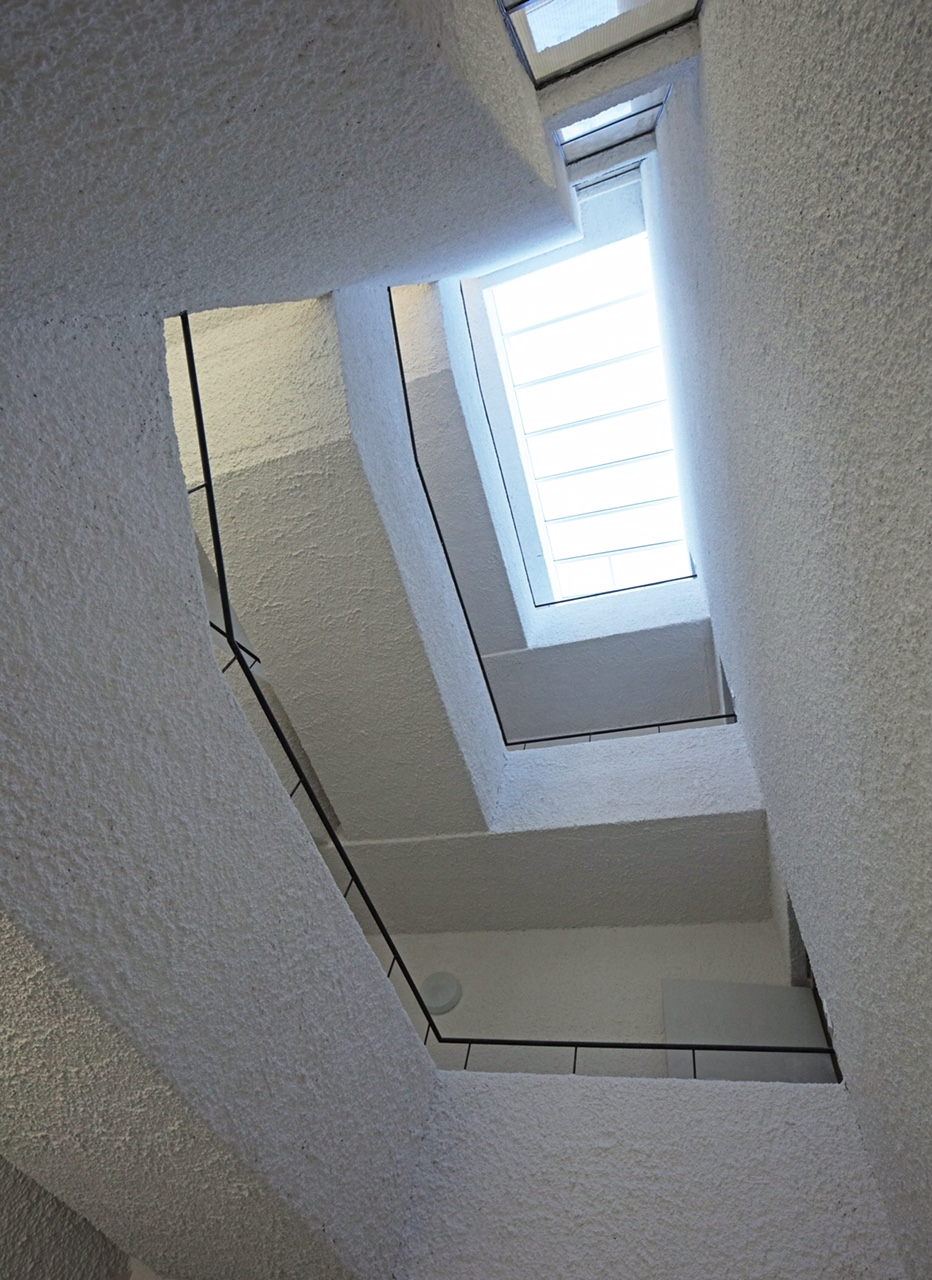
Staircase House 12 after renovation

In 2016, the houses 2 und 17 have been festively reopened after their renovation, followed by the re-inauguration of the houses 12 and 13 from the second phase of construction in March 2017. Also, plans to refurbish the community houses have been started in 2017, the construction works regarding these four buildings will be completed in 2020.

Financing partner in the ongoing renovations is the Umweltbank. After completion of all work in 2024, the Student Village will offer places for around 900 residents.

== The student village in literature ==
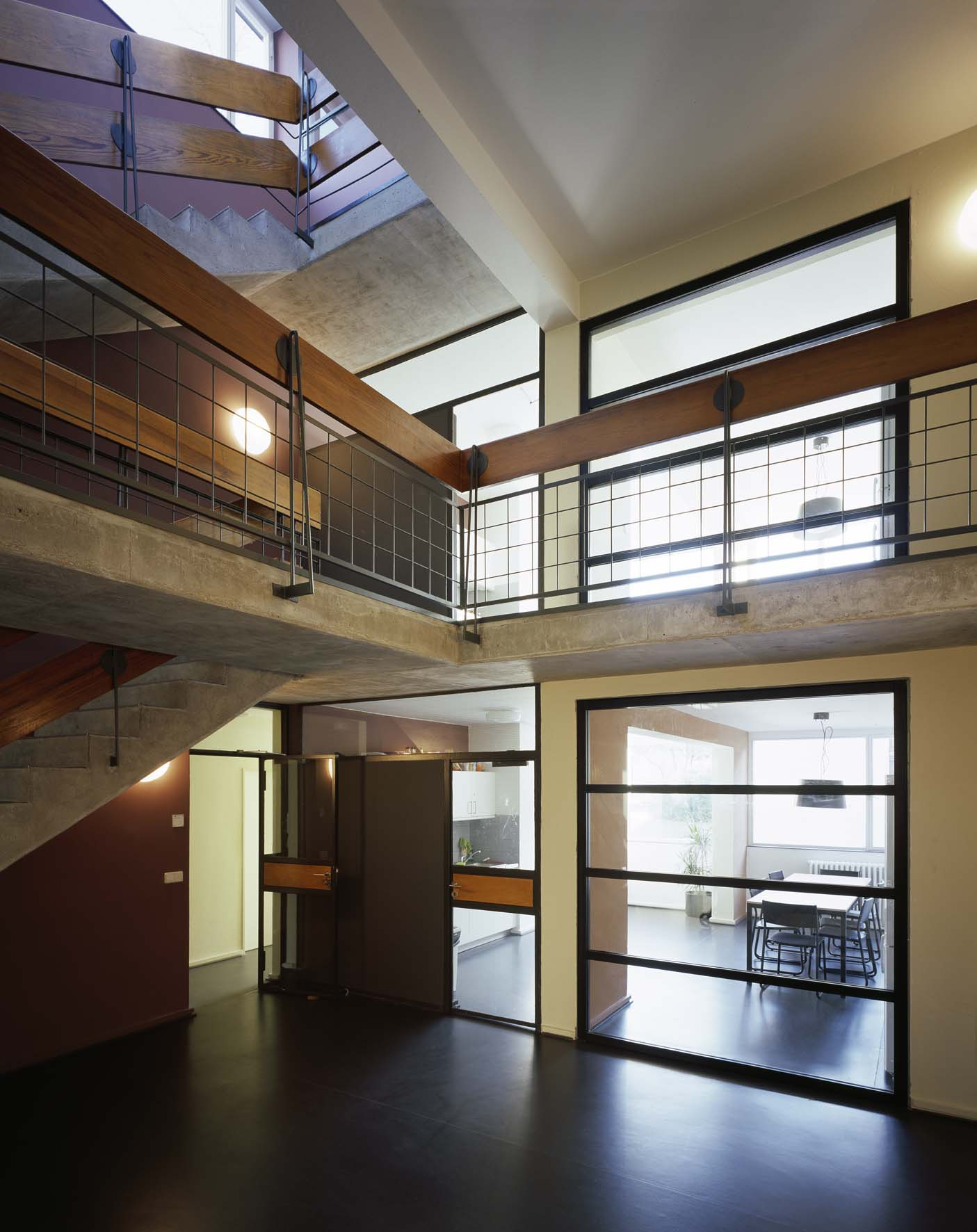
Studentendorf Schlachtensee, Berlin, House 18

The student village Schlachtensee is one of the venues of the novel "The Beautiful Phoenix" by Jochen Schimmang, which is set at the time of the [student movement]. One of the chapters of the novel is entitled "The Cave of Schlachtensee".

== The student village in film ==
Some scenes of the movie "The Reader" by Stephen Daldry based on the novel by Bernhard Schlink were filmed in House 2 in the Student Village. Even scenes of the 1993 movie "Aliens" by Florian Gärtner were shot in Schlachtensee.

== Literature ==
Monographs

- Architekten- und Ingenieurverein zu Berlin (ed.): Berlin und seine Bauten. Teil VII, Band B Sozialbauten. Berlin 2003.
- Guido Brendgens, Norbert König: Berlin Architektur. Architekturführer. Berlin 2003.
- Adrian von Buttlar, Gabi Dolff-Bonekämper, Kerstin Wittmann-Englert: Die Baukunst der Nachkriegsmoderne. Architekturführer Berlin 1949–1979. Berlin 2013.
- Yorck Förster, Christina Gräwe, Peter Cachola Schmal (Hrsg.): Deutsches Architektur Jahrbuch 2017. Berlin 2017.
- Peter Gruss, Gunnar Klack, Matthias Seidel (ed.): Fehling+Gogel. Die Max-Planck-Gesellschaft als Bauherr der Architekten Hermann Fehling und Daniel Gogel. Berlin 2009.
- Konstantin von Freytag-Loringhoven: Erziehung im Kollegienhaus. Reformbestrebungen an den deutschen Universitäten der amerikanischen Besatzungszone 1945–1960, Stuttgart 2012, 485–498.
- Jürgen Häner: 20 Jahre Studentendorf Schlachtensee. Berlin 1979.
- Vroni Heinrich: Hermann Mattern. Gärten – Landschaften – Bauten – Lehre. Leben und Werk. Berlin 2012.
- Florian Heilmeyer: Schaustelle Nachkriegsmoderne Berlin. Die Neuen Architekturführer Nr. 107. Berlin 2007.
- Kai Kappel, Mattias Müller (ed.): Geschichtsbilder und Erinnerungskultur in der Architektur des 20. und 21. Jahrhunderts. Regensburg 2014.
- Landesdenkmalamt Berlin (ed.): Denkmale in Berlin. Bezirk Steglitz-Zehlendorf, Ortsteil Nikolassee. Denkmaltopographie der Bundesrepublik Deutschland. Petersberg 2013.
- Rolf Rave, Hans-Joachim Knöfel: Bauen seit 1900 in Berlin. Berlin 1968.
- Martina Schilling (ed.): Freie Universität Berlin. Ein Architekturführer zu den Hochschulbauten. Berlin 2011.
- Jochen Schimmang: Der schöne Vogel Phönix, hier das Kapitel Die Höhlen von Schlachtensee. In: Suhrkamp, 1979
- Senatsverwaltung für Stadtentwicklung und Umwelt (ed.): DenkMal energetisch – weniger ist mehr. Begleitmappe zur gleichnamigen Wanderausstellung. Berlin 2012.
- Senatsverwaltung für Stadtentwicklung und Umwelt (ed.): Selfmade City Berlin. Stadtgestaltung und Wohnprojekte in Eigeninitiative. Berlin 2013.
- Otto Stammer (ed.): Studenten über Wohnheime. Ergebnisse einer empirisch-soziologischen Untersuchung an der Freien Universität Berlin. Durchgeführt im Institut für Soziologie an der Freien Universität Berlin. Berlin 1959.
- Martin Wörner, Karl-Heinz Sigel, Paul Hüter, Doris Mollenschott: Architekturführer Berlin. Berlin 2013.
- Wüstenrot Stiftung (Hrsg.): Denkmalpflege der Moderne. Konzepte für ein junges Architekturerbe. Stuttgart, Zürich 2011.
- Ralf Zünder: Studentendorf Schlachtensee 1959 bis 1989. Eine Dokumentation. Berlin 1989.

Essays and unpublished manuscripts

- Andreas Barz: Was bleibt von den Ideen der Re-Education nach dem Ende des Kalten Krieges? Anmerkungen zur Rettung des Studentendorfes Schlachtensee. In: Kai Kappel, Mattias Müller (ed.): Geschichtsbilder und Erinnerungskultur in der Architektur des 20. und 21. Jahrhunderts. Regensburg (2014), 111–128.
- Andreas Butter: Das Studentendorf Berlin-Schlachtensee. Anmerkungen zur Architektur- und Sozialgeschichte. (unpublished manuscript and appendix of the survey of Landesdenkmalamt Berlin.) Berlin 2005.
- Marina Döring: Studentenwohnheime. In: Architekten- und Ingenieurverein zu Berlin (ed.): Berlin und seine Bauten. Teil VII, Band B Sozialbauten. Berlin (2003), 206–244.
- Dorothea Külbel: Demokratie sanieren. In: Bauwelt, Heft 35 (2012), 20–27.
- Peter Rumpf: Sanierung des Studentendorfes Berlin-Schlachtensee. In: Baumeister, Heft B6 (2008), 86–91.
- Studentendorf Berlin-Zehlendorf. In: Bauwelt, Heft 51/52 (1959), 1448–1497.
- Christoph Tempel: Studentendorf Schlachtensee ist Nationales Kulturdenkmal. In: Bauwelt, Heft 20 (2006), 4.
- Studentendorf der Freien Universität Berlin, Berlin-Schlachtensee. In: Werk – Schweizer Monatsschrift für Architektur, Kunst, Künstlerisches Gewerbe. Heft 9, (1961), 128–131.
- Mathias Remmele: ... in die Jahre gekommen. Studentendorf Schlachtensee. In: "Deutsche Bauzeitung", 3, 2015, 58–63.
