= List of dormitory buildings =

This is a list of notable dormitory buildings.

== Historic buildings in the US ==
The following ones have been individually listed on the U.S. National Register of Historic Places and hence are individually notable.

- Ranger's Dormitory, Grand Canyon, Arizona
- Miss Orton's Classical School for Girls (Dormitory), Pasadena, California
- Cabin Creek Ranger Residence and Dormitory, Wilsonia, California, a rustic dormitory in a remote location
- Yulee-Mallory-Reid Dormitory Complex, Gainesville, Florida
- State Teachers and Agricultural College for Negroes Women's Dormitory and Teachers' Cottage, Forsyth, Georgia
- Dorchester Academy Boys' Dormitory, Midway, Georgia
- Lemhi Boarding School Girls Dormitory, Lemhi, Idaho
- Idaho State Industrial School Women's Dormitory, St. Anthony, Idaho
- St. John's Lutheran College Girls Dormitory, Winfield, Kansas
- West Dormitory-St. John's College, Winfield, Kansas
- Marvin College Boys Dormitory, Clinton, Kentucky
- Tangipahoa Parish Training School Dormitory, Kentwood, Louisiana
- Indian Dormitory, Mackinac Island, Michigan
- Morris Industrial School for Indians Dormitory, Morris, Minnesota
- Administration Building-Girls' Dormitory, Minnesota School for the Deaf, Faribault, Minnesota
- Fergus County Improvement Corporation Dormitory, Lewistown, Montana
- Employees' New Dormitory and Club, Albuquerque, New Mexico
- Allison Dormitory, Santa Fe, New Mexico
- North Carolina School for the Blind and Deaf Dormitory, Raleigh, North Carolina
- Zaneis School Teacher's Dormitory, Healdton, Oklahoma
- Lutheran Theological Seminary Building: Beam Dormitory, Columbia, South Carolina
- Settlement School Dormitories and Dwellings Historic District, Gatlinburg, Tennessee
- Scottish Rite Dormitory, Austin, Texas
- St. Edward's University Main Building and Holy Cross Dormitory, Austin, Texas
- Utah School for the Deaf and Blind Boys' Dormitory, Ogden, Utah
- White River Mess Hall and Dormitory, White River Entrance, Washington

Other dormitory buildings are listed on the NRHP as contributing buildings in historic districts.

== Other ==
There are other notable dormitory buildings:

- Mather House (Harvard University), where Facebook started

== See also ==
- List of YMCA buildings
- List of YWCA buildings
