= Studentendorf Schlachtensee eG =

Student housing cooperative in Germany

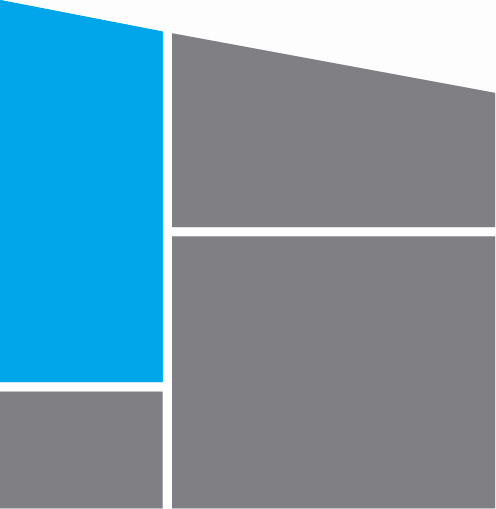
- Company type: eG (Registered cooperative)
- Industry: Real estate, Student housing
- Founded: May 15, 2002; 24 years ago
- Headquarters: Berlin, Germany
- Key people: Andreas Barz (CEO); Jens-Uwe Köhler (Board Member); Christa Markl-Vieto (Chair of the Supervisory Board)
- Revenue: ▲€5.1 million (2022)
- Number of employees: ▲ approx. 50 (As of 2023)
- Website: www.studentendorf.berlin

The Studentendorf Schlachtensee eG is a housing cooperative founded in 2002 in Berlin. It manages over 1,300 residential units for students and academics at three locations: Studentendorf Schlachtensee, Studentendorf Adlershof, and the International Center for Scholars (IBZ Berlin). The cooperative's headquarters is located at its namesake site in Schlachtensee.

The cooperative's business strategy focuses on managing apartments and shared flats for the academic housing market, serving both domestic and international students and scholars. According to its statutes, the cooperative aims to promote "the intercultural, dialogue-oriented, and democratically constituted cohabitation of students and young academics from all over the world." A core part of its identity is the preservation and monument-compliant renovation of the Studentendorf Schlachtensee as a national cultural monument and an international meeting place.

== History of the Architectural Monument ==
The Studentendorf Schlachtensee (Schlachtensee Student Village) is a significant example of post-war modernist architecture and a symbol of the democratic new beginning in West Berlin during the 1950s.

=== Founding as a "Harvard on the Wannsee" ===
Following the end of World War II and the Berlin Blockade, the United States promoted the democratization of Germany as part of its re-education program. The Free University of Berlin was founded as a democratic counterpoint to the socialist-influenced Humboldt University of Berlin in East Berlin. To offer students not just a place of study but also a living environment shaped by the values of freedom, community, and international understanding, the creation of the Studentendorf was initiated. The project was primarily funded by the American government (through the Marshall Plan) and the Ford Foundation.

The design was created by the architects Hermann Fehling, Daniel Gogel, and Peter Pfankuch. Their concept was a radical departure from the traditional German tenement blocks (Mietskasernen). Instead, they designed a campus-like layout with loosely arranged buildings, abundant green spaces, and community facilities intended to foster social interaction. The first 13 houses were built between 1959 and 1964. The declared goal was to create a "Harvard on the Wannsee"—a place of cosmopolitan academic life.

=== Center of the Student Movement ===
In the 1960s, the Studentendorf evolved into a major social and political hub of the West Berlin student movement. Its open, discursive atmosphere and the high concentration of politically engaged students from around the world made it a fertile ground for the Außerparlamentarische Opposition (APO, "Extra-Parliamentary Opposition"). Many residents were active in the Protests of 1968. The unique architecture and communal living environment encouraged critical engagement with society and politics, making the village a key location in the history of West Berlin.

== Decline, Rescue, and Founding of the Cooperative ==
=== Threat of Demolition ===
After the fall of the Berlin Wall, the Studentendorf lost its political significance for the Senate of Berlin. The buildings were in need of renovation, and their upkeep was expensive. In the late 1990s, the Senate planned to sell the area through its real estate agency, the Liegenschaftsfonds Berlin. This would likely have led to the demolition of the heritage-listed buildings and their replacement with luxury housing. Many houses were vacated and left to decay.

=== Citizens' Initiative and Founding ===
Massive resistance to these plans formed among residents, the student self-administration (Studentische Selbstverwaltung, SV), former residents, architects, and conservationists. A campaign called "Rettet das Studentendorf!" ("Save the Student Village!") generated considerable public and political pressure. Out of this movement, the Studentendorf Schlachtensee eG was founded on May 15, 2002. Its goal was to acquire the entire complex, renovate it in accordance with its monument status, and return it to its original purpose.

After intensive negotiations with the Liegenschaftsfonds Berlin, which began in the founding year, the young cooperative succeeded in purchasing the property in 2003. It immediately began to bring the vacant houses back into use.

== Development of the Cooperative since 2003 ==
The monument-compliant renovation of the Studentendorf began in 2006. To finance the high costs, the cooperative sold the land to the Swiss pension fund CoOpera Sammelstiftung PUK in 2009, while simultaneously securing a 99-year ground lease (Erbbaurecht). This model secured the long-term funding for the renovation while allowing the cooperative to retain full control over the operations and the shaping of student life.

The cooperative subsequently focused on operations, renovations, and the creation of additional student housing. Also in 2009, it took over the management of the International Center for Scholars (IBZ) in Berlin-Wilmersdorf under a management contract. In October 2014, the Studentendorf Adlershof opened on the campus of Humboldt University of Berlin, designed based on the communal model of Schlachtensee.

For the fiscal year 2014, the cooperative reported revenue of €2.7 million with 36 employees at year-end.

== The Cooperative Today ==
=== Structure and Organization ===
The Studentendorf Schlachtensee eG is a service cooperative whose members (tenants, employees, and supporters) purchase shares to become co-owners. The highest governing body is the general assembly of its members. The assembly elects the supervisory board, which in turn appoints and oversees the executive board. This democratic structure ensures that the cooperative's policies remain aligned with the interests of its members and its statutory purpose.

=== Cultural and Social Program ===
In keeping with the founding idea of the Studentendorf, the cooperative places great emphasis on a rich cultural and social life. A tutor program regularly organizes events, workshops, excursions, and festivals to promote intercultural exchange and a sense of community at all its locations. This is considered an essential part of the cooperative's identity and unique selling proposition.
