= Umweltbank =

German direct bank

Coordinates: 49.453859°N 11.087435°E

Umweltbank AG
- Type: Corporation
- Industry: Direct bank
- Founded: 22 July 1994
- Headquarters: Nuremberg, Germany
- Total assets: €3.7 billion (2018)
- Number of employees: 172 (2018)
- Website: umweltbank.de

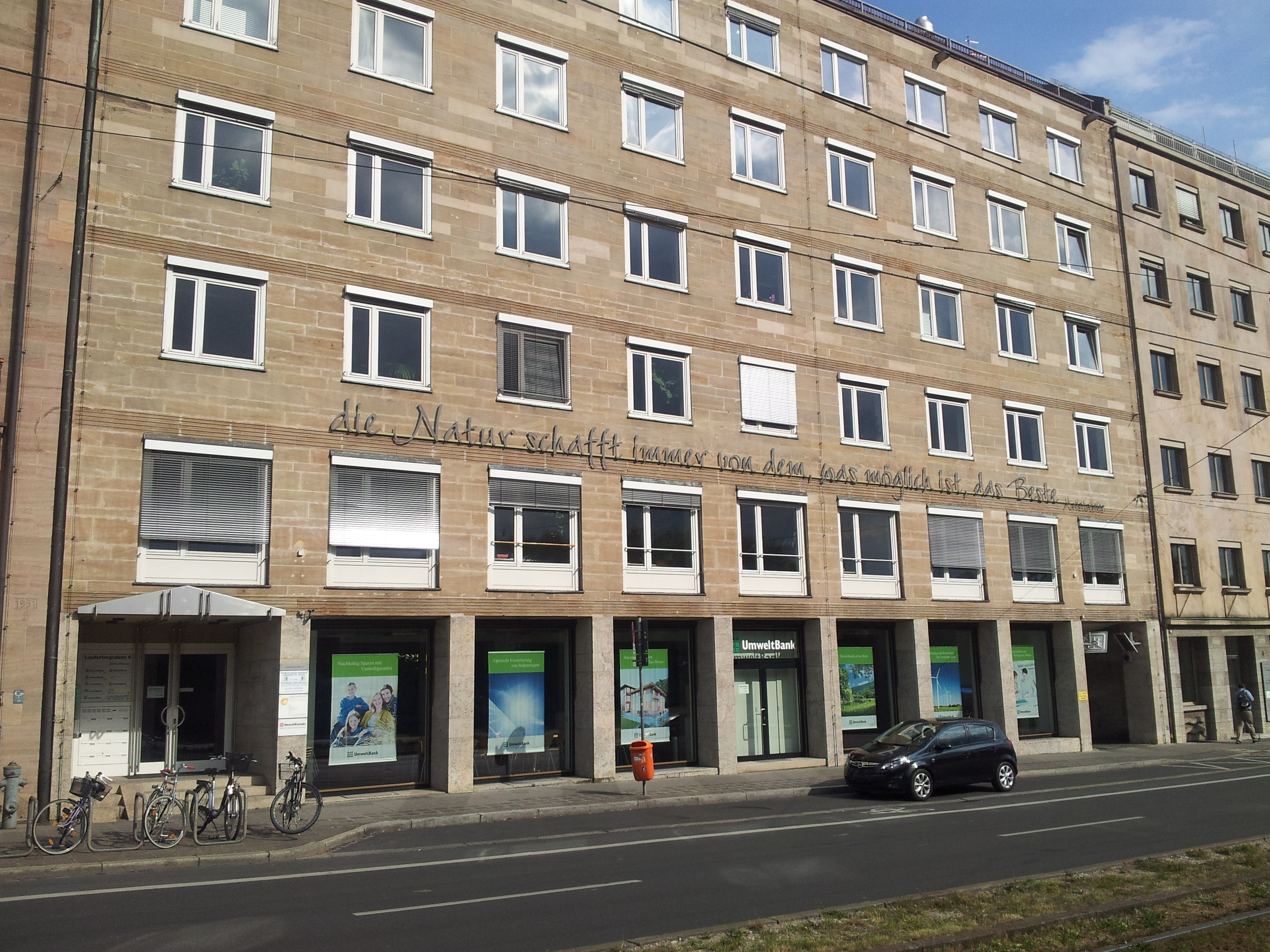
Company headquarters at Laufertorgraben

The Umweltbank AG is a German direct bank that exclusively finances ecological loan projects with its customer deposits.

== Corporate philosophy ==
The Umweltbank has the objective of contributing to the protection of the environment through its business activities in every respect anchored in its statutes.

=== Business model ===
With its customer deposits, the bank exclusively finances ecological lending projects in the fields of solar, ecological mortgages, wind and hydropower projects, biomass projects and organic farming. The Umweltbank defines these financing priorities by the following positive and exclusion criteria:

Positive criteria:

- Energy saving measures
- Regenerative energy production
- Decentralized energy production, combined heat and power
- Environmentally friendly construction
- Ecological agriculture and ecological forestry
- Recycling/circular economy
- Pollutant reduction and elimination
- Sustainable business

Exclusion criteria:

- Large power plants (brown coal/hard coal, nuclear energy)
- Weapons or military goods (production/trade)
- Environmentally harmful products or technologies (production/trade)
- Non-compliance with environmental regulations
- Genetic engineering in agriculture
- Unfair business practices, e.g. corruption, human rights violations

=== Bodies ===
Compliance with environmental criteria for lending is controlled by an independent environmental council. As the ecological control body, it advises the Umweltbank on environmental matters and is thus the direct counterpart to the supervisory board. In addition, five expert teams consisting of members of the environmental advisory council and Umweltbank employees assist the management. These develop action recommendations in groups that feed into the further development of the Umweltbank's statutes.

=== Share ===
The shares of the bank are 84.4 percent in free float, mainly held by customers and employees. The remaining 15.6 percent holds the GLS Bank. The subscribed capital amounts to €27,882,405 and is divided into 27,882,405 bearer shares (as of December 2017).

== History and numbers ==
Former logo

The bank was founded in 1994 by Horst P. Popp. In early 1997, it started business operations with the registration of a full banking license in the commercial register. In mid-2001, it went public. Since its foundation, the bank has grown steadily.

Figures:
	1997 (Founding)	2010	2011	2012	2013	2014	2015	2016	2017	2018	Changes compared to 2017 [%]
Customer	7,000	86,116	106,295	111,385	114,408	115,306	114,681	114,661	113,694	113,290	−0.4
Employees	32	142	146	142	138	141	132	139	153	172	+12.4
Business volume [million euro]	52.2	1,939.8	2,273.1	2,566.3	2,737.4	2,855.9	2,985.7	3,416	3,766	4,119	+9.4
Balance sheet total [million euro]	39.5	1,762.9	1,994.0	2,332.7	2,512.8	2,595.4	2,757.7	3,206	3,485	3,699	+6.1
Investment volume [Mio. euro]	15.5	1,179.7	1,338.1	1,554.9	1,720.4	1,808.0	1,938.2	2,056	2,157	2,330	+8.0
Lending volume [million euro]	25.5	1,449.7	1,732.6	1,916.8	2,125.1	2,245.8	2,496.2	2,596	2,710	2,812	+10.1
Net income [million euro]	0	10,004	11,008	12,043	13,447	14,542	15,586	16,154	16,662	16,936	+1.6

The bank publishes a loan portfolio every year, which can be used to see what kind of projects have been financed. The loan portfolio in 2017 was composed as follows: 35.9 percent solar loans, 35.2 percent ecological building financing, 25.2 percent wind and hydro projects, and 3.7 percent biomass projects, organic farming and other projects.

The total volume of the projects funded, which consisted of credit draws and open loan commitments, amounted to €2,710 billion (as of December 2017). The ratio of credit volume to customer deposits (referred to by the bank as the environmental guarantee coverage ratio) was around 114 percent in 2017 (as of December 2017).

Overall, carbon dioxide (CO_{2)} savings were achieved in 2017 from the more than 22,500 subsidized loan projects amounting to 538,827 t CO_{2}.

The bank is a member of the statutory deposit insurance, but does not belong to a deposit guarantee fund; thus deposits up to 100,000 euros are protected in full.

== Public ==
=== Awards ===
Since its founding, the company has received several awards, including the Golden Bull for Sustainability 2009, B.A.U.M. Environmental Award 2010, the German CSR Prize 2013 and was awarded in the competition Office & Environment 2017. In 2017, the Umweltbank was honored by Chip's new customer-hotline-test. Several direct banks were compared with regard to their availability, waiting time, service and transparency. The Umweltbank made second place. In the customer survey of the German Institute for Service Quality on behalf of n-tv, the Umweltbank was awarded the quality rating very good. Customer satisfaction was assessed in terms of service, conditions, transparency, security, image and reputation of the bank and product range. In addition, customer anger and readiness to recommend flowed into the overall result.

=== Engagement ===
The company supports various environmental organizations and conservation organizations through donations and membership fees. It is a member of various interest groups and associations that promote the preservation of the environment and an ecological way of life or promote the development of renewable energies. The Umweltbank is an official bearer of the Fair Company seal. In 2017, it introduced an environmental management system that is validated according to the guidelines of the Eco-Management and Audit Scheme. In addition, the Umweltbank has also published the Declaration of Compliance with the German Sustainability Code. This makes it one of around 200 companies that use the standard drafted by the German Council for Sustainable Development for their non-financial reporting. The signing of the Diversity Charter advocates recognition and appreciation of all people in their corporate culture.

=== Criticism ===
The magazine Finanztest reported that some investors were disappointed with the banking house. The bank had offered and sold them risky investments in wind farms with false advertising statements. Furthermore, it was reported that long-term investments in wind farms were recommended as secure retirement provision. The losses sustained by investors in numerous closed-end funds distributed by the Umweltbank have led to allegations that the Umweltbank has deliberately misled investors about the risks of wind funds. The magazine Der Spiegel reported in early 2014 that many wind power projects, which attracted savers with the promise of high returns, were running poorly. One example was the report of a wind farm participation, which the Umweltbank had advertised as an ideal supplementary pension, but in which after a short time the prospective remittances did not occur. After a lawsuit filed by the Verbraucherzentrale Bundesverband against the Umweltbank, the bank was defeated at the Nuremberg Higher Regional Court. The verdict was final. In the opinion of the court, the bank was not allowed to point out the advantages (high profit participation interest) without also presenting the risks accordingly.

At the beginning of 2015, the Umweltbank was criticized for failing to inform on its homepage that the board had no budget discharge for 2013.

According to a report by Die Tageszeitung from Berlin, the Umweltbank is said to have refused a paid student his leave and continued salary in the event of sickness. The Umweltbank violated thereby valid employment law. According to the board, the bank has failed to do so due to an inappropriate administrative burden, which arises as part of a flexible working model. A student should have been dismissed without warning or a reason due to a submitted vacation request. However, according to the CEO Horst Popp this model is no longer offered for reasons of legal certainty. A judicial dispute between the bank and the student is pending.

After persistent criticism, the founder of the bank and CEO Popp resigned as a member of the executive board on April 30, 2015. According to a report by the Handelsblatt he was accused of violating the German Stock Corporation Act during the discharge of the Management Board for the 2013 financial year and of insufficiently pointing at the existing risks in the distribution of wind farm funds and profit participation certificates. At the annual general meeting on 15 June 2015, the Umweltbank was heavily criticized by investor representatives for a lack of transparency and decisions in an autocratic manner. Due to a computer error, the meeting had to be closed without result.

== See also ==
- List of banks in Germany
