= Studentendorf Adlershof =

University and college residential building

Coordinates: 52°25′59″N 13°31′36″E

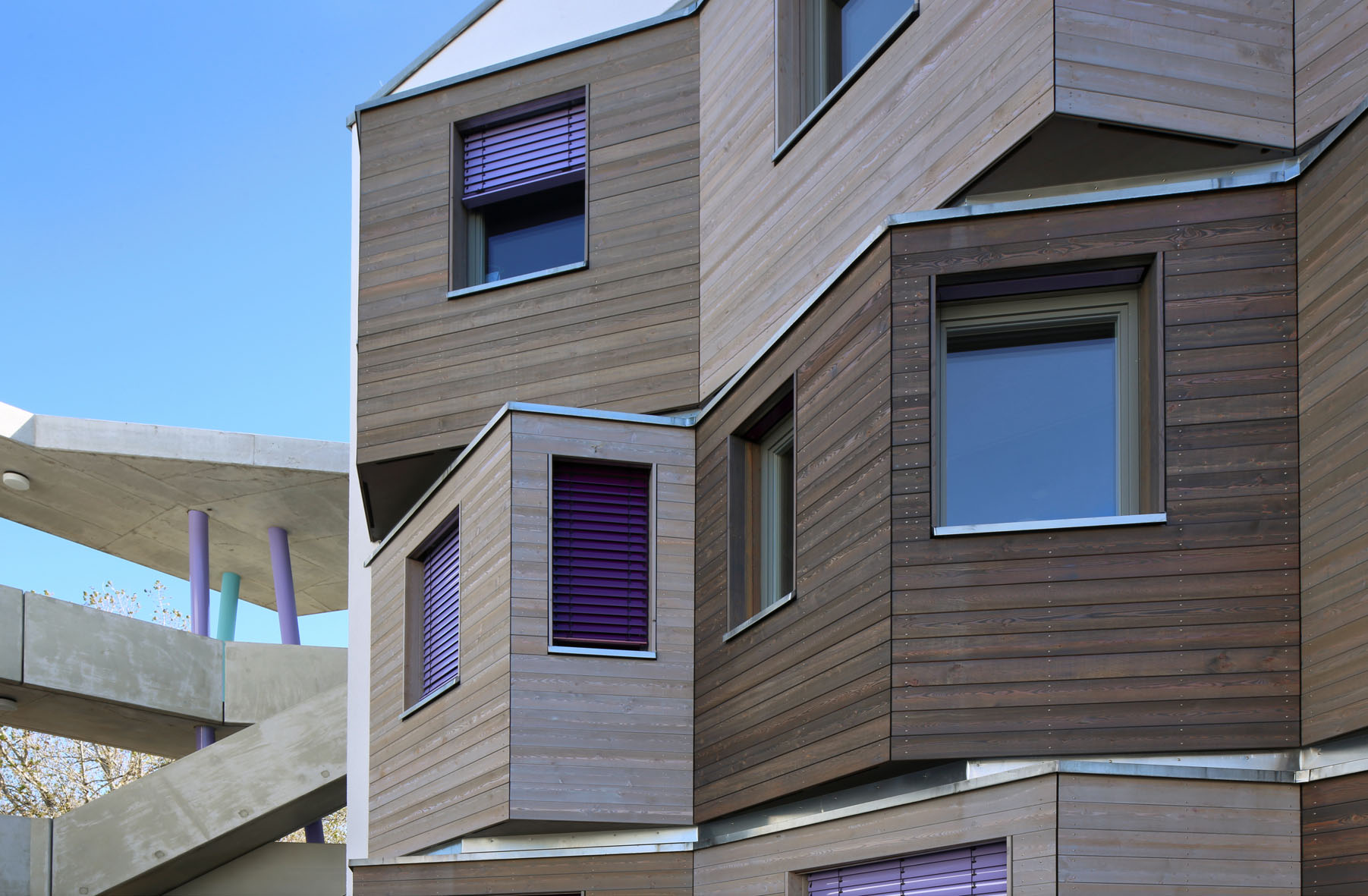
Studentendorf Adlershof

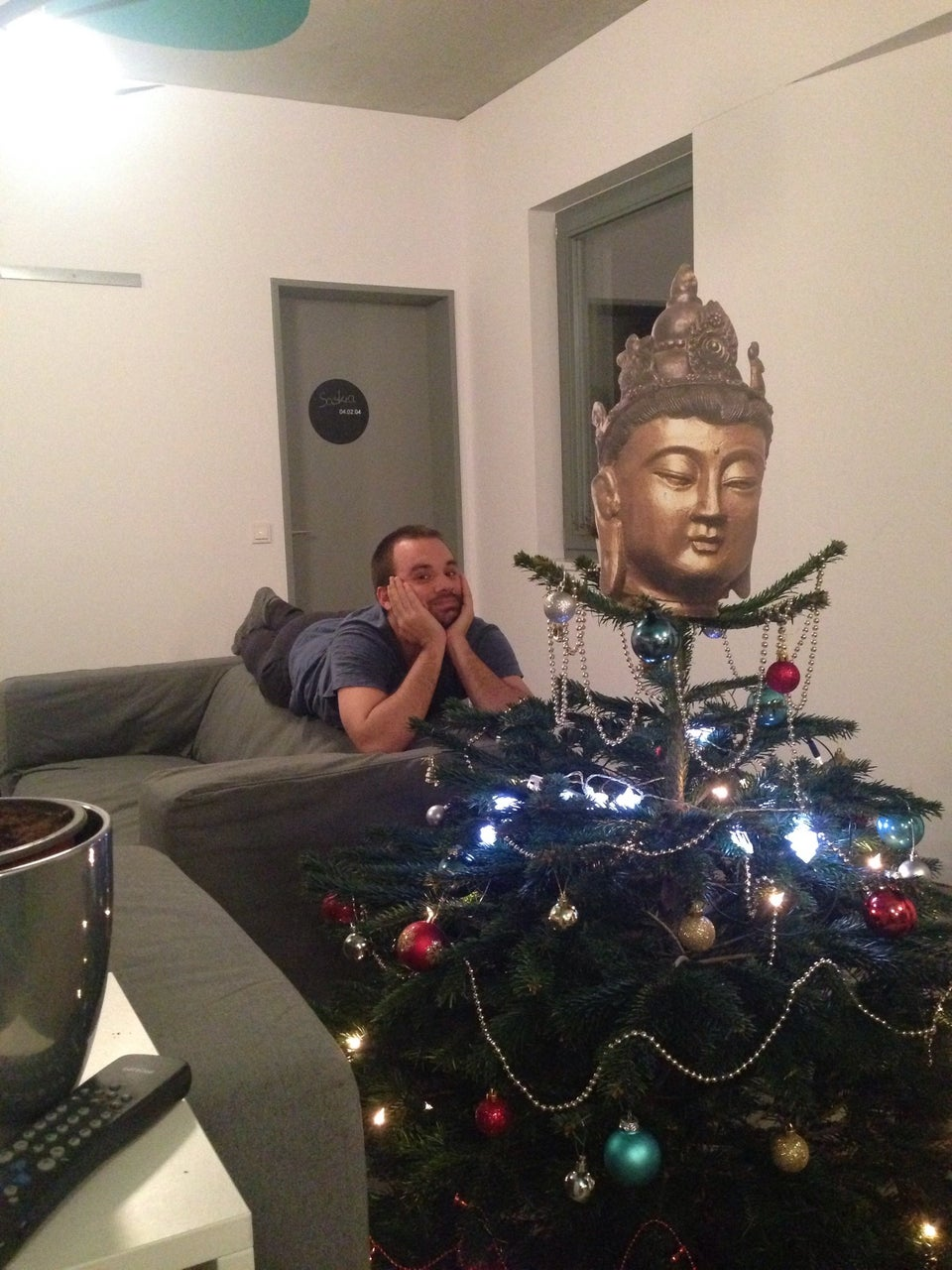
Christmas in Adlershof

The Studentendorf Adlershof is a building complex inaugurated in 2014 for student accommodation in Berlin.

== Location ==
The Studentendorf Adlershof is located in the south-east of Berlin, in Adlershof in the district of Treptow-Köpenick. The complex is close to the Campus Adlershof of the Humboldt University with its scientific institutes as well as to the WISTA. It was opened on 21 October 2014. The Studentendorf Adlershof is part of the efforts to establish residential living in Adlershof next to the existing Scientific Park.

On an 11,000 sqm area, ten buildings as well as a garden designed by Locodrom form the Studentendorf Adlershof. In total 288 students live in the eight three-story buildings. On each floor, 13 residents share a communal area with kitchen, dining room and lounge area. The individual rooms for the residents have en-suite bathrooms and are arranged around the living space. The two four-storey buildings along the Abram-Joffe-Street offer single and double apartments. In total 386 students can live at Studentendorf Adlershof.

== Architecture ==
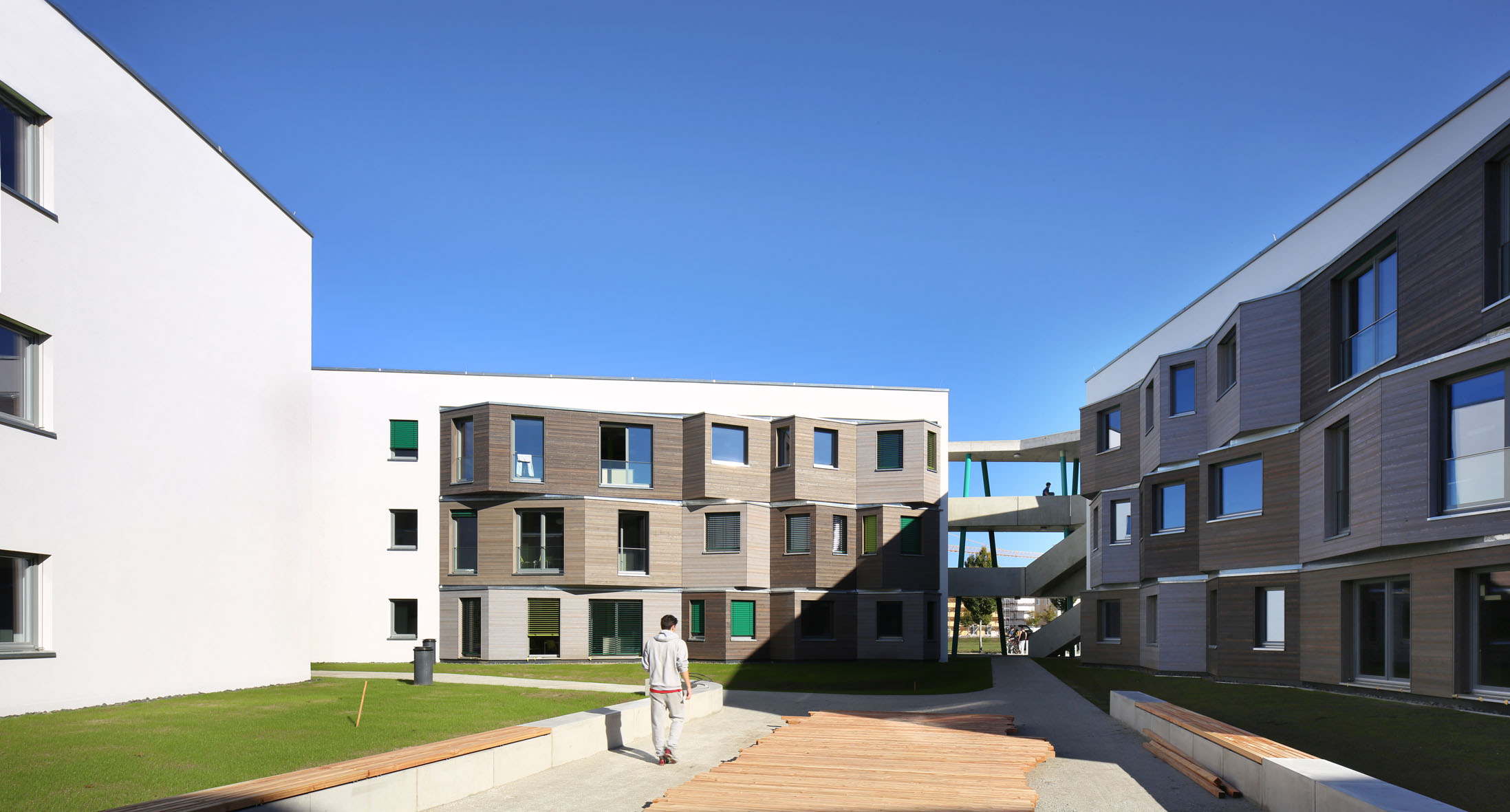
Studentendorf Adlershof, View of the courtyard

The architecture of the Studentendorf Adlershof is dominated by the so-called thinker-bays (Denker-Erker), which characterise each residential unit. The Denker-Erker is simultaneously a place of retreat as well as a viewpoint. Through the different orientation of the Denker-Erker, the orientation of the windows, the shades of grey of the wood panel and the coloured sunshades the pre-fabricated facade is softened. These variations make each building unique.

The model for the residential and architectural concept is Germany's unique and heritage listed Studentendorf Schlachtensee in Berlin's south-west. This can be seen especially with regard to the urban character as a student village and for the community-oriented residential buildings.

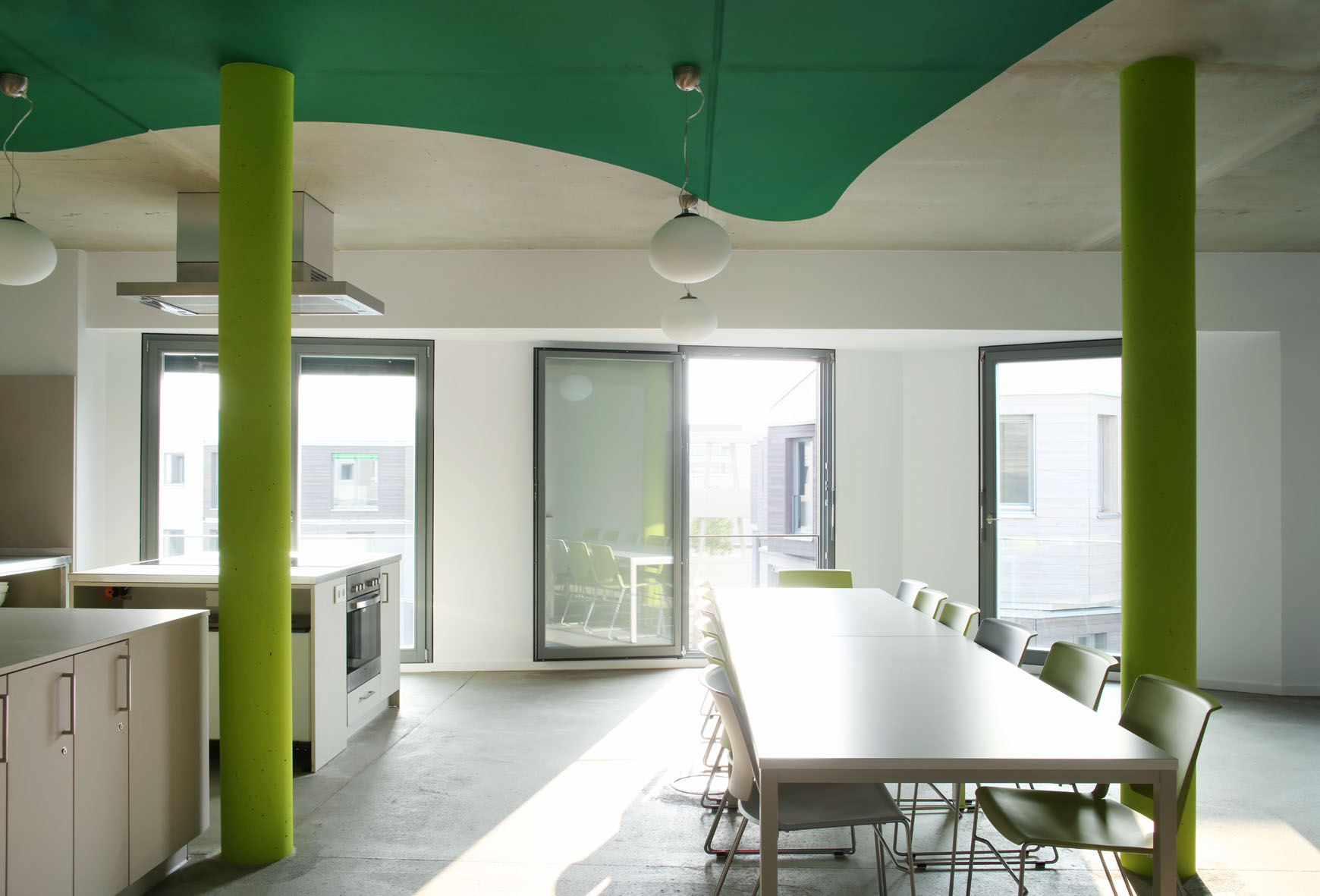
Studentendorf Adlershof, View of a shared space

As in Schlachtensee, all communal buildings are located around a village square. At the village square the club, the rental office, the kindergarten, the gym as well as the laundrette are located.

Two additional courtyards complete the landscape concept. The courtyards are play and adventure areas for the residents and are designed so that communication is possible even between the houses through the large windows in the living landscapes (living rooms).

The Berlin-based architectural office die Zusammenarbeiter were responsible for the design. The starting point was in October 2010 when the project won the tender for the development of the area under the urban development project "Wohnen am Campus".

== Financing and management ==
Financing partner for the Studentendorf Adlershof was the Swiss CoOpera Sammelstiftung PUK. The residential complex is administrated by the cooperative Studentendorf Schlachtensee eG.

== Literature ==
- "Bauen für Studierende als Beitrag zur Wohnungsbaupolitik". Bauwelt (in German). 21 September 2022.
- "Erker für Denker – Studentendorf in Berlin-Adlershof eröffnet". BauNetz (in German). 21 October 2014.
