= Großer Wannsee =

Lake near Berlin

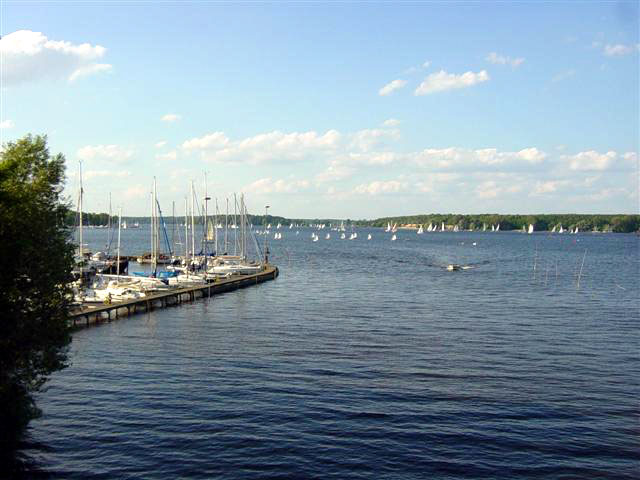

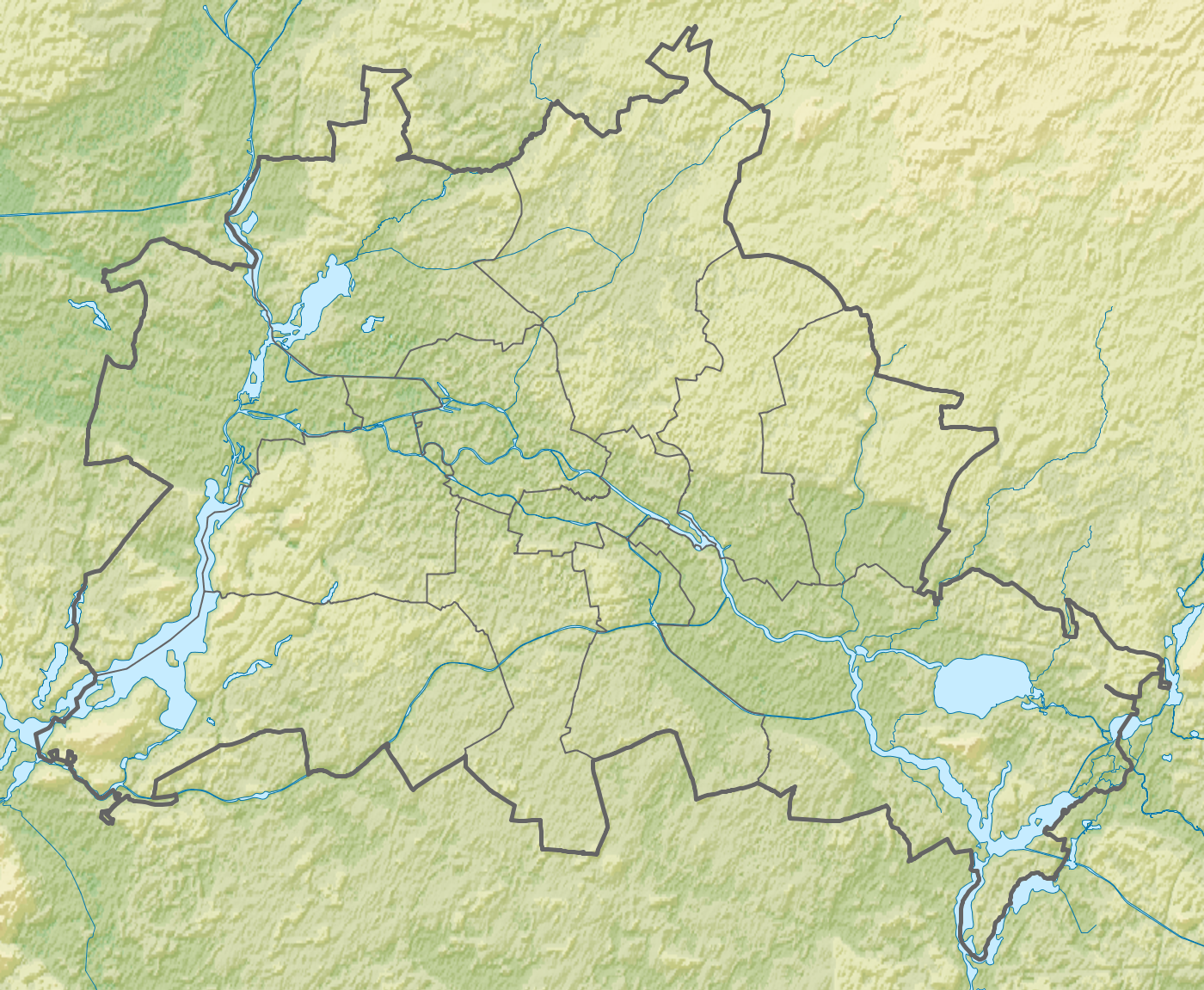
- Location within Berlin

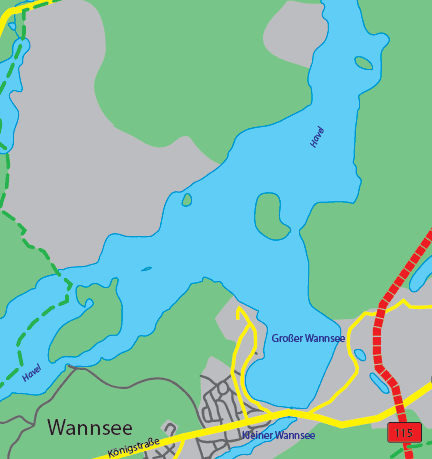
- map
- Location: Berlin
- Coordinates: 52°26′36″N 13°9′41″E
- Primary inflows: Havel
- Primary outflows: Havel
- Basin countries: Germany
- Surface area: 2.732 km^{2} (1.055 mi^{2})
- Max. depth: 9 m (30 ft)
- Surface elevation: 32 m (105 ft)
- Settlements: Berlin-Wannsee

The Großer Wannsee (German: [ˈɡʁoːsɐ ˈvanˌzeː], "Greater Wannsee", "See" means lake) is a bay of the Havel river near the locality of Wannsee and Nikolassee (in the borough of Steglitz-Zehlendorf), a south-western suburb of the German capital Berlin not far from Potsdam. Between the river itself and the Wannsee lies the Breite, or Grosse Breite (Broad, or Great Broad). To the north lies the island of Schwanenwerder and, opposite from the Greater Wannsee on the other side of the Havel, is the locality of Kladow (in Spandau).

== Overview ==
The Wannsee lake is well known as the number-one bathing and recreation spot for western Berlin, especially from a 1951 Schlager hit by teen idol Cornelia Froboess. The Strandbad Wannsee, an open-air lido with one of the longest inland beaches in Europe and a popular nudist area, was built in 1920–30 after a concept by architect Richard Ermisch. Situated on the eastern shore of the lake it is officially part of the Nikolassee locality.

== Photogallery ==
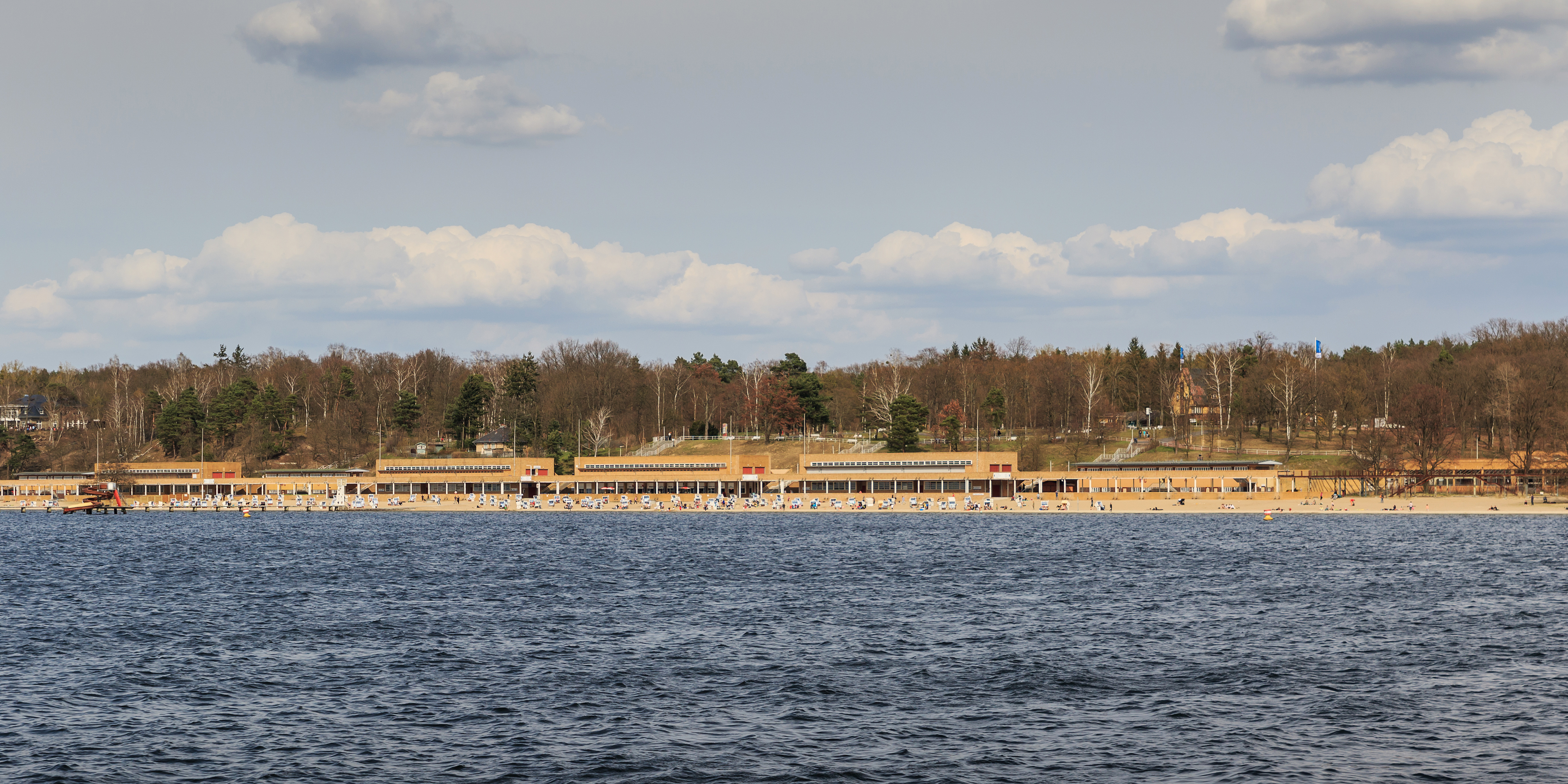
Strandbad Wannsee

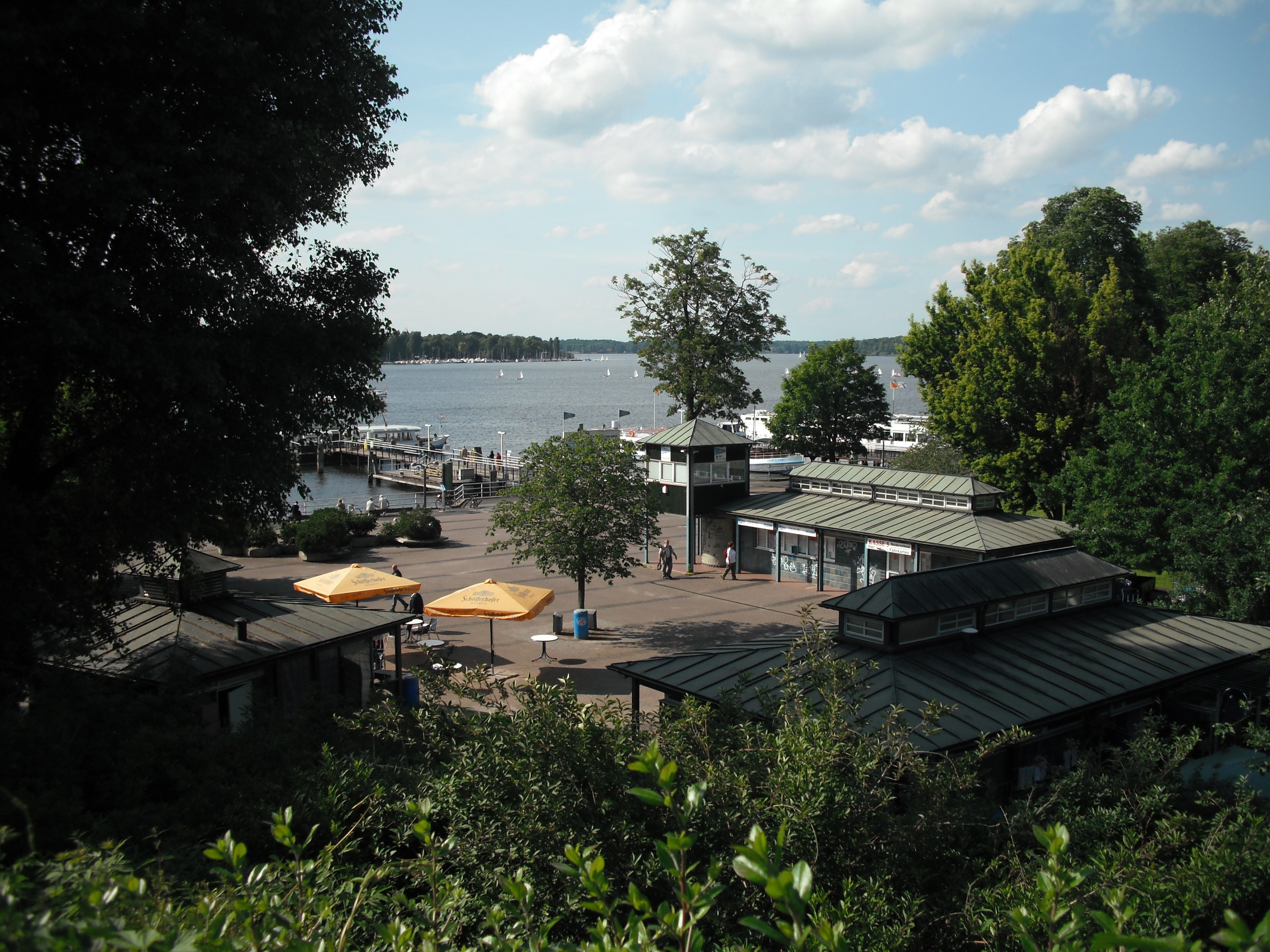
View of the lake from Wannsee railway station

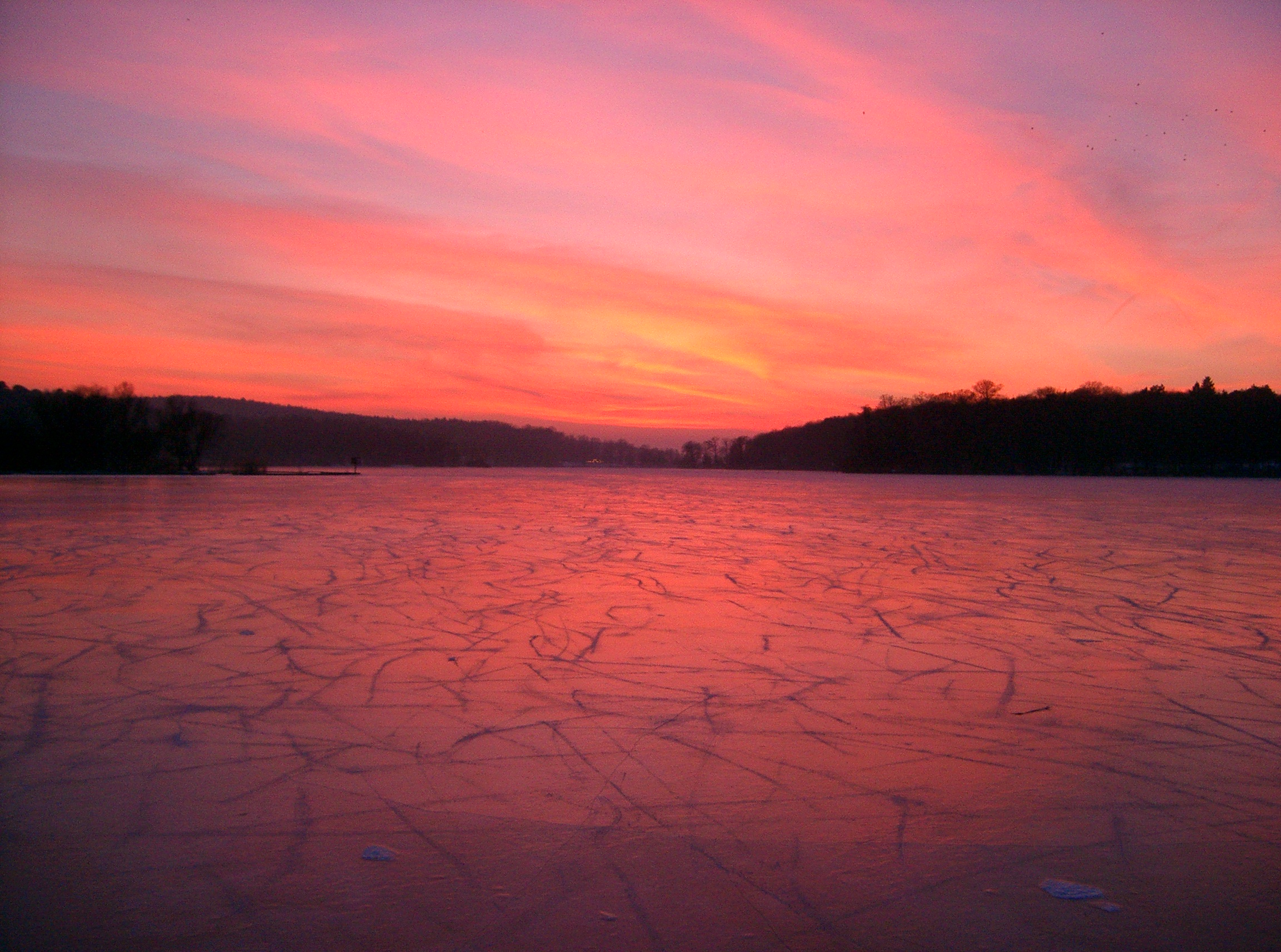
Sunset on the lake

The excursion boat MS Moby Dick on the Berlin Wannsee in July of 1990

Sailboats on the Berlin Wannsee took this photo while sailing a boat I rented from the American Yacht harbor on the Berlin Wannsee in May of 1991 This shows more than forty other sailboats in the distance

I took this photo while sailing a boat I rented from the American Yacht harbor on the Berlin Wannsee in May of 1991

The excursion boat MS Rheinland on the Berlin Wannsee in May of 1990

Sailboats on the Berlin Wannsee in May of 1991

== See also ==
- Kleiner Wannsee (Little Wannsee)
- Pfaueninsel
- Griebnitzsee
- Wannsee Conference, which took place at a villa on the banks of the Grosse Wannsee
