= Griebnitz Canal =

German Canal

Coordinates: 52.410273°N 13.145657°E

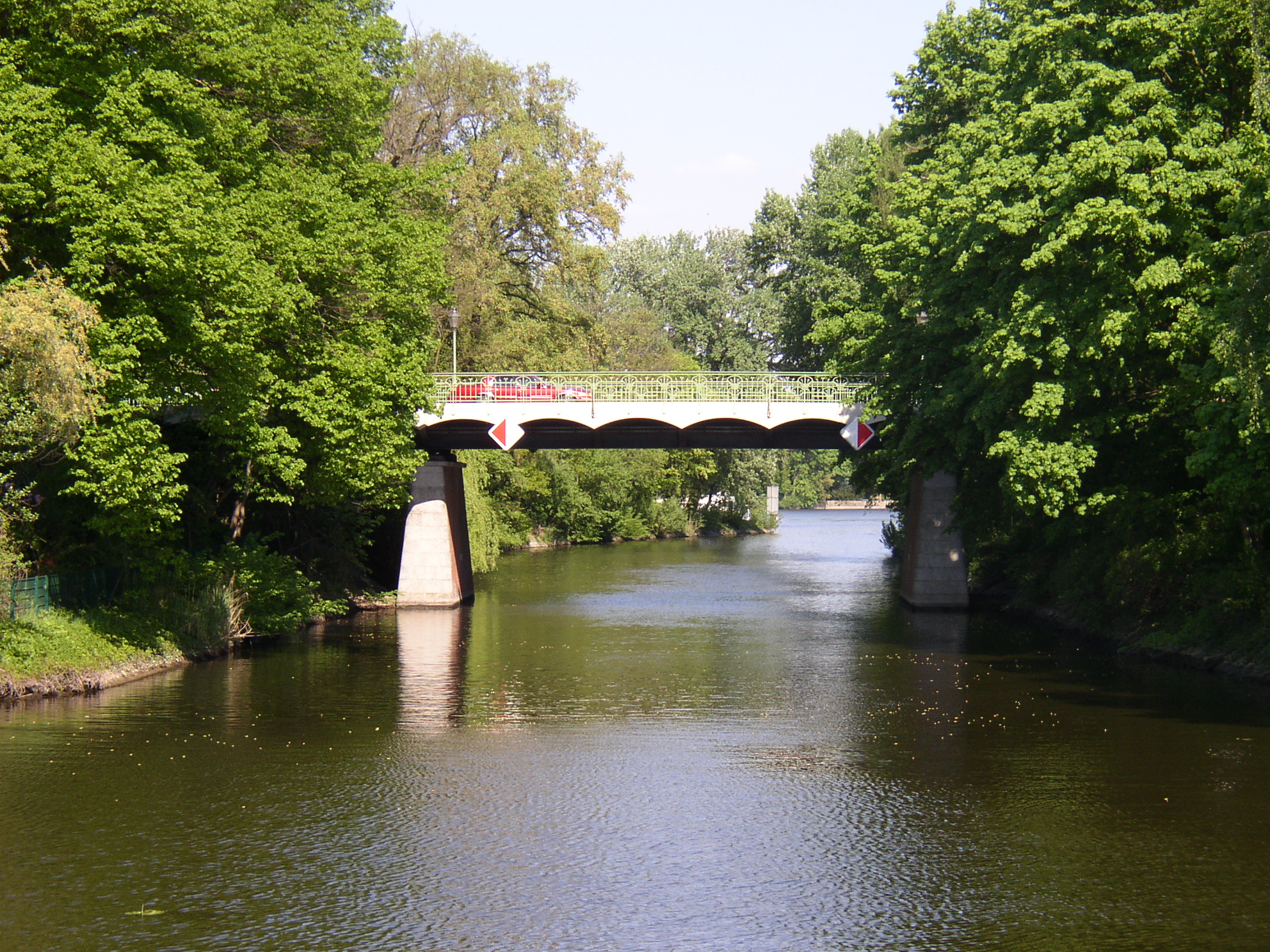
- The Alsen bridge on the Griebnitz Canal

Specifications
- Length: 3.9 km (2.4 miles)
- Minimum boat draft: 1.3 metres (4.3 ft)
- Minimum boat air draft: 5 metres (16 ft)

Geography
- Start point: Griebnitzsee
- End point: Großer Wannsee

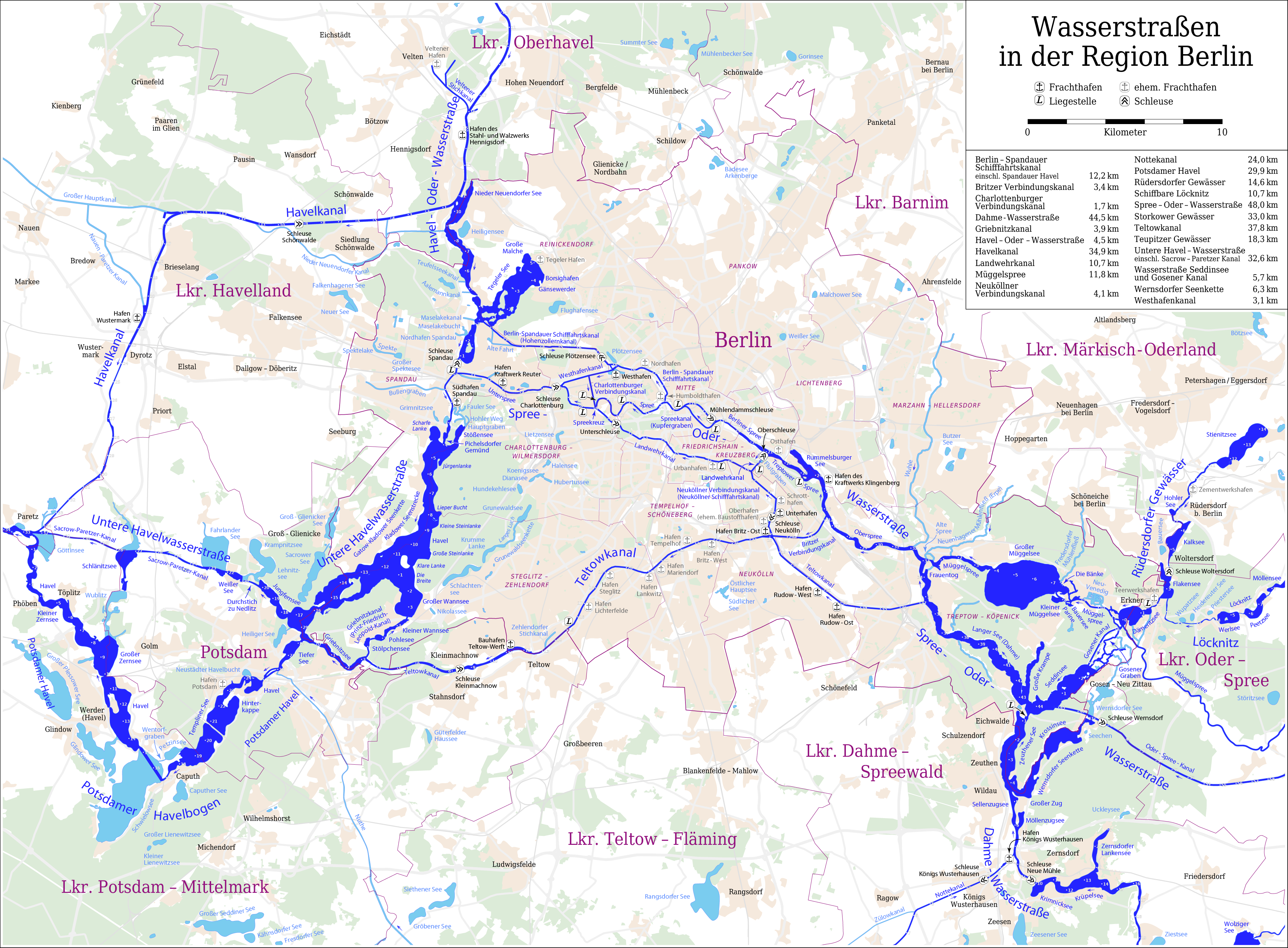
Map of waterways in the Berlin region

The Griebnitz Canal (German: Griebnitzkanal, pronounced [ˈɡʁiːpnɪts.kaˌnaːl]), formerly known as the Prinz-Friedrich-Leopold-Kanal, is a canal in the western suburbs of Berlin, the capital city of Germany. It consists of a chain of small lakes: the Stölpchensee (German: [ˈʃtœlpçn̩ˌzeː]), Pohlesee (IPA: [ˈpoːləˌzeː]), and Kleiner Wannsee (IPA: [ˈklaɪnɐ ˈvanˌzeː]), together with artificial channels linking them together.

The canal connects the Griebnitzsee, a lake on the course of the Teltow Canal, with the Großer Wannsee, a lake on the course of the River Havel. Including the three intermediate lakes, it has a length of 3.9 kilometres (2.4 mi) and is navigable by boats with a draught of up to 1.3 metres (4 ft 3 in). It has no locks, but is crossed by three bridges, with a maximum clearance of 5 metres (16 ft).
