= Griebnitzsee =

Lake in Babelsberg, Berlin, Germany

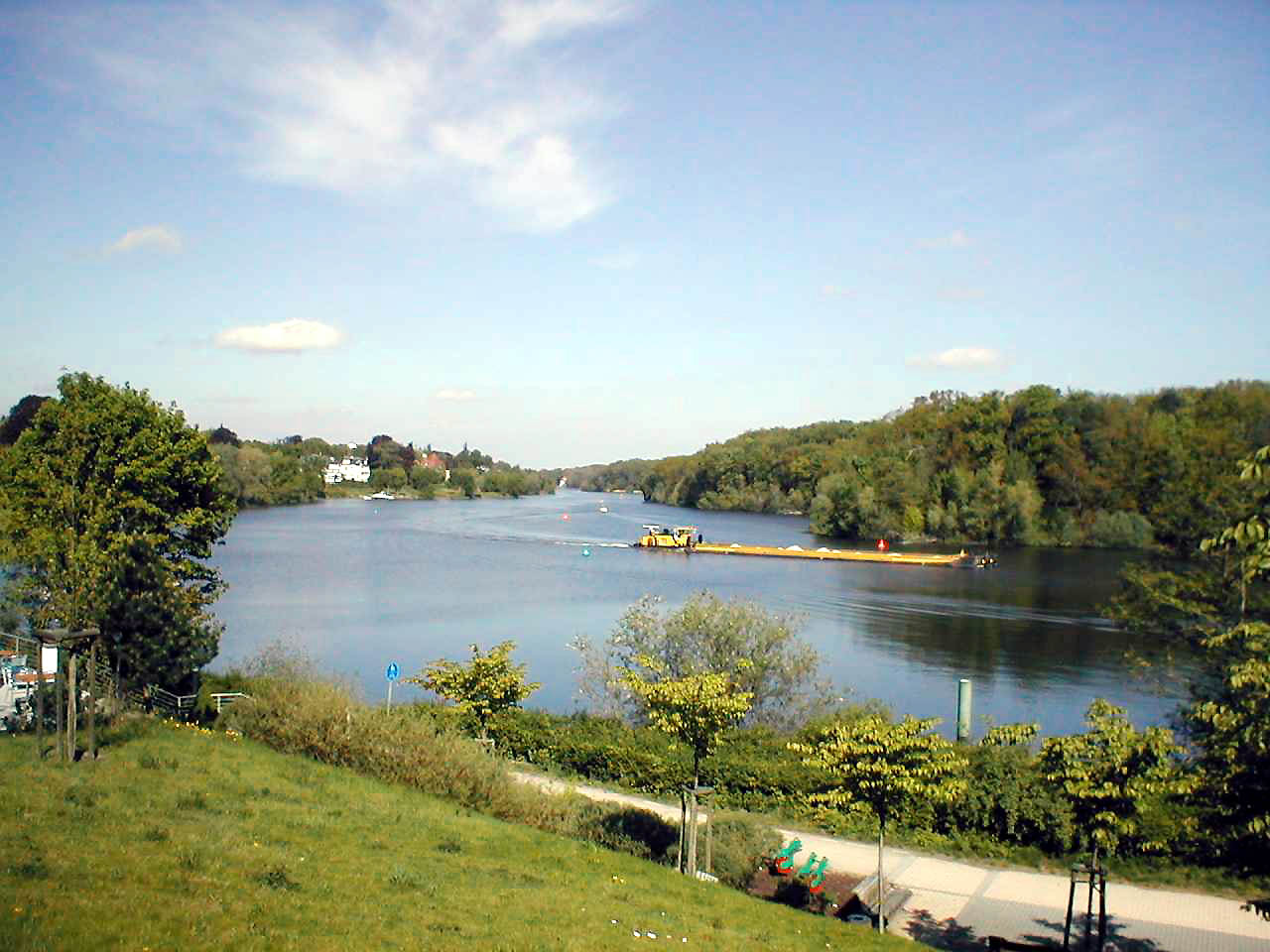
- View of Griebnitzsee

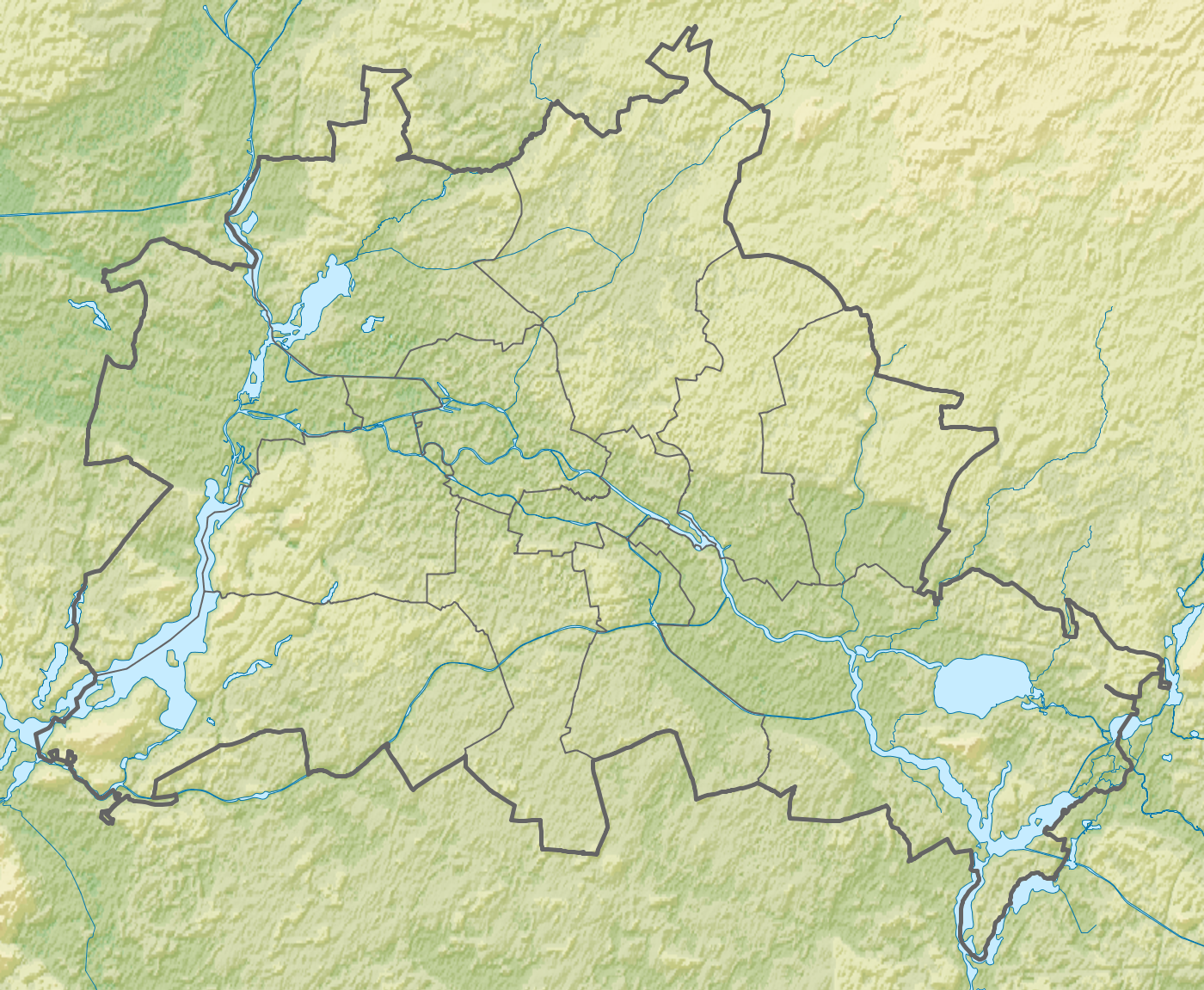
- Location within Berlin
- Location: Berlin, Brandenburg
- Coordinates: 52°23′55″N 13°7′55″E
- Primary inflows: Teltow Canal
- Basin countries: Germany
- Max. length: 3.1 km (1.9 mi)
- Max. width: 265 m (869 ft)
- Surface area: ca. 59.2 ha (146 acres)
- Surface elevation: 29.4 m (96 ft)
- Settlements: Berlin, Potsdam

Griebnitzsee (German: [ˈɡʁiːpnɪtsˌzeː], from the Slavic Grib, Mushroom) is a lake at the south-western outskirts of Berlin, the capital city of Germany. At an elevation of 29.4 m, its surface area is ca. 0.592 km². The lake forms the border between the German states of Berlin and Brandenburg. It is bordered in the north by the Wannsee district of Berlin, and in the south and west by the Babelsberg district of Potsdam in Brandenburg.

== Overview ==
At its eastern end, near Kohlhasenbrück in Berlin, the Griebnitzsee receives water from the Teltow Canal. One third of this water flows into the adjacent Griebnitz Canal and through a chain of lakes towards the Großer Wannsee. The remaining water flows through the Griebnitzsee to its western end, where it flows into the River Havel near Potsdam.

The length of the Griebnitzsee is navigable, and forms part of the Teltow Canal route, which links the River Havel with the River Spree and the Oder-Spree Canal, bypassing the reach of the River Spree through central Berlin. The navigable Griebnitz Canal provides an alternative link from the Griebnitzsee to the River Havel via the Großer Wannsee.

During the time of the Berlin Wall, the border between Berlin and East Germany ran down the middle of the lake. A patrol path existed for border guards along the southern and western shore. After German reunification, this path became a public lakeside promenade. In 2009, however, many new owners of lakeside properties began blocking public access by fencing off their properties down to the water's edge.
