= Strandbad Wannsee =

Outdoor pool in Berlin, Germany

Coordinates: 52°26′20″N 13°10′38″E

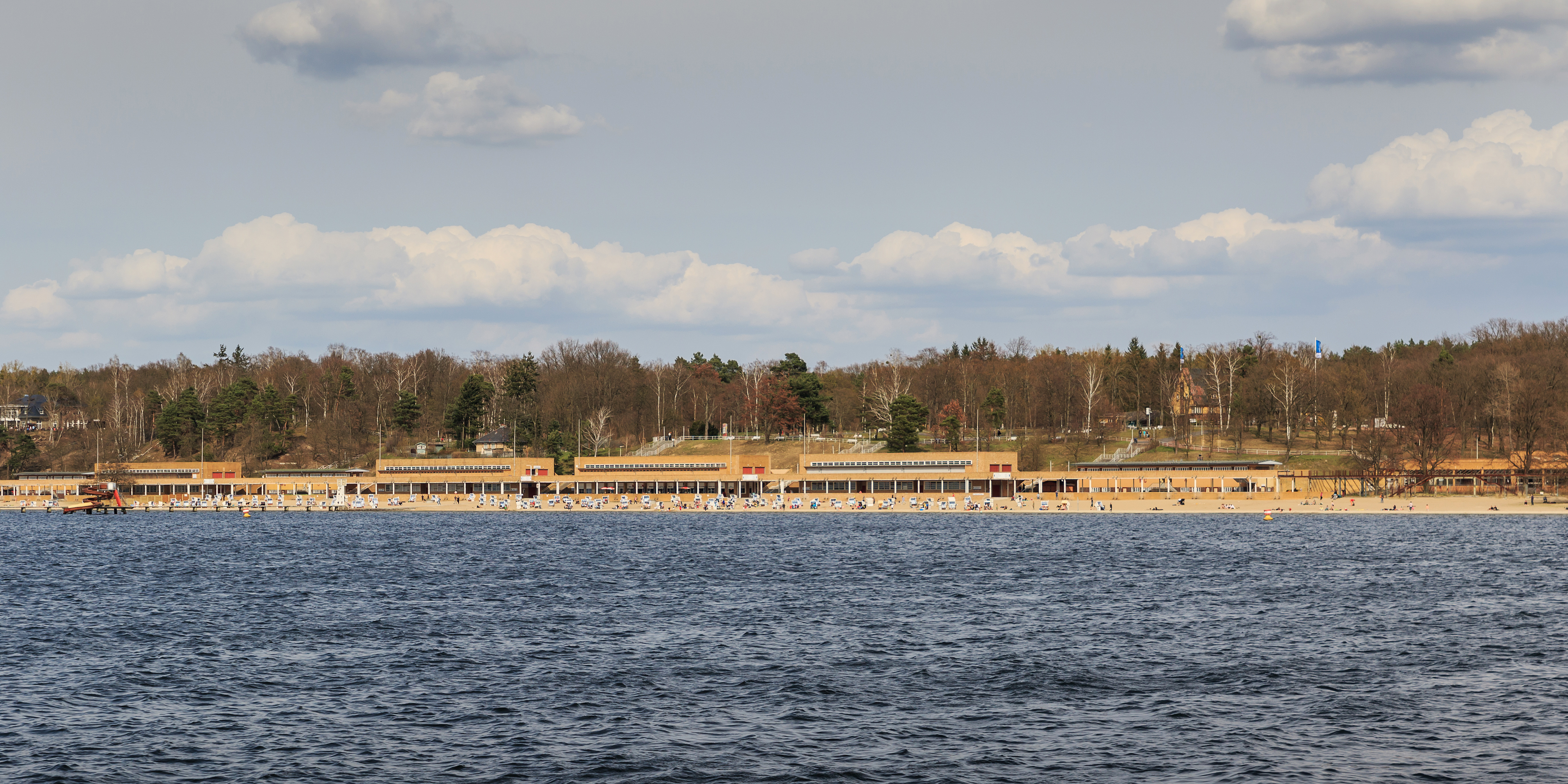
A view from the Havel river

The Strandbad Wannsee is an open-air lido on the eastern shore of Großer Wannsee lake, a large bay of the Havel river in Berlin, Germany. Opened in 1907, it is one of the largest inland lidos in Europe, with a beach that is 1,275 metres (4,183 ft) long and 80 metres (260 ft) wide, replenished with sand from the Baltic coast. The entire ensemble of long, low buildings that appear to grow out of the underlying sandhills were designed by Richard Ermisch and fellow architect Martin Wagner in 1929–1930; it is today placed under monumental protection.

== Location ==
The area is part of the Nikolassee locality (not of Wannsee), in the Steglitz-Zehlendorf borough, in southwestern Berlin. The lido stretches along the northern section of the lake's east bank, at the eastern end of the Breite, the broad stretch of the Havel between Kladow and Wannsee, close to Schwanenwerder island.

Strandbad Wannsee is run as a municipal swimming bath by the City of Berlin. The premises cover about 355,000 m^{2}, 130,000 of which is water, and 60,000m² are for sunbathing, and a park. The facilities laid out for about 12,000 bathers provide a beach, including a separate nudist-section, strandkorbs and deckchairs, a slide at the end of the shallower water area as well as playground, park and a promenade that was a prominent part of the historical plans for the establishment.

== History ==
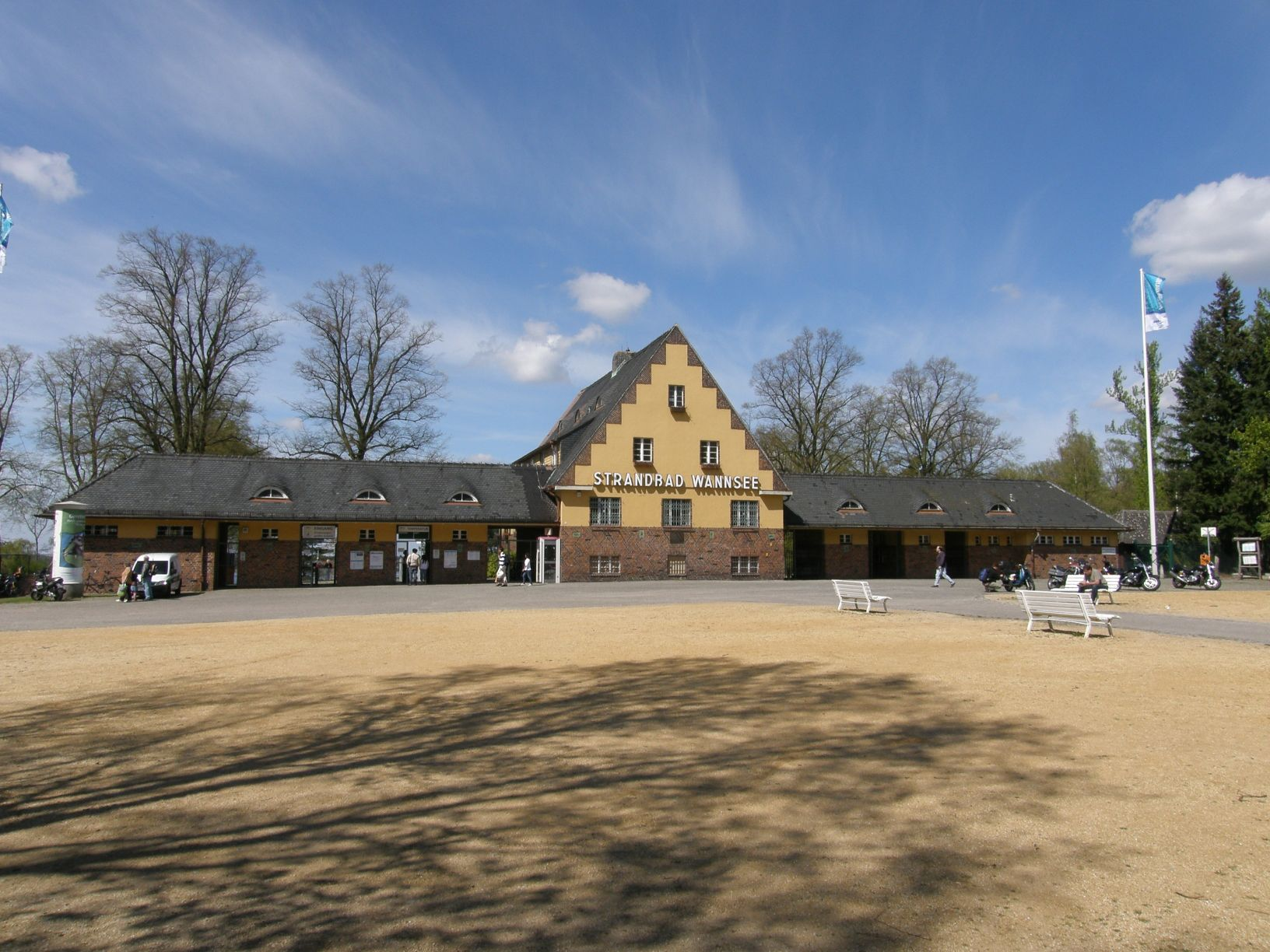
The entrance building

Origins of the lido date back to the early 1900s. The City of Berlin, German capital since the unification of 1871, experienced immense growth, both in population and in building. Large housing projects were planned and realized, cramping the working population close together in small flats, with little light and less fresh air. Consequently, people tried to escape when their life allowed. Preferred places of escape for those who could not afford to go on vacation to the Baltic Sea were the lakes in the vicinity. Especially suitable was the Greater Wannsee, with its broad and shallow, sandy eastern shore.

Owing to the moral standards of the time, public bathing, especially with women and men in plain sight of each other, was illegal. In 1907, the administration of the Brandenburg Teltow district, southwest of Berlin, then the cognisant authority over the area, gave in to public pressure and officially allowed bathing on a 200-metre stretch of beach. Conduct was strictly regulated, down to details of dress laid down by police regulation.

Construction works began in May 1907. In 1909, a lease was signed between the royal government and a local merchant Frankenthal from Nikolassee. The Freibad Wannsee, as it was named, then consisted of one beach each for men and women, both 65 metres in length, separated by the family section that offered 350 metres of beach. The sections were separated with wooden fences. Tents, erected at the foot of the steeper incline towards the forest served as changing facilities, according to sections, and booths and mobile vendors provided services. The whole area was surrounded by fences to discourage those merely wanting to watch the proceedings. With the signing of the lease, use of the facilities required paying of a fee.

After the First World War, the importance of the lido at the Wannsee increased, not only among the people of Berlin, but also in surrounding communities. After the lease ended, the municipality of Berlin took over, and the business became part of the municipal forest service, due to the location in the Grunewald. In the same year, 1924, the tents were replaced by thatched pavillons, and the sanitary facilities, lacking up until then, were improved. The area was expanded to 800 metres and was open year-round, making the facilities available to winter bathers and skaters. Attendance increased, especially after the S-Bahn from nearby Potsdam to Erkner was opened. One year counted 900.000 visitors.

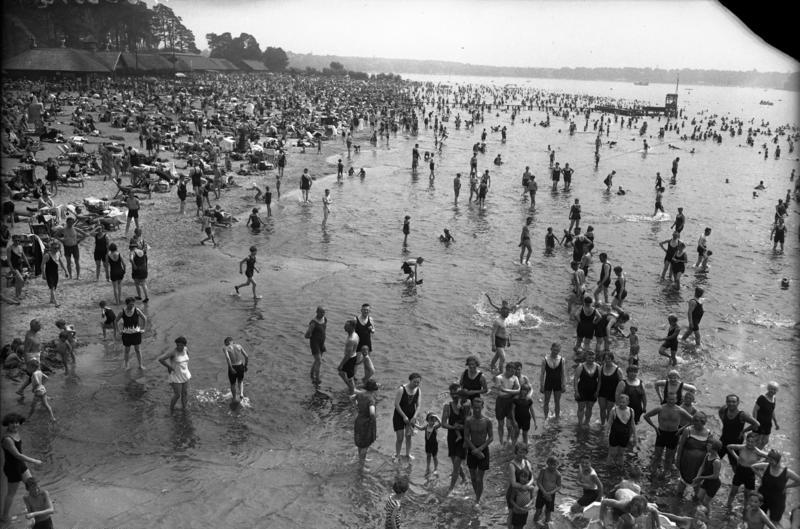
The beach in 1926

Nearby stations Nikolassee and Wannsee eased access to the beach, and the existing facilities were no longer sufficient. Plans to erect a permanent building at the site had come up as early as 1910, by Martin Wagner, later municipal construction director, but had been delayed due to the First World War. Now, the municipality of Berlin tasked the same Martin Wagner and colleague Richard Ermisch, both employees of the city and experienced in public building, with planning a large scale improvement project. While Wagner was responsible for the whole ensemble and its arrangement, Ermisch took care of the architecture. Construction commenced in 1929. The new buildings opened in 1930.

The Great Depression compromised the execution of the plans Wagner and Ermisch had come up with. Initially, the budget had been a sum of 5 million ℛ︁ℳ︁ that was supposed to have been spent on an additional five of the two-storeyed halls, as well as a large, circular main restaurant, a pier with a café on it, a marina and an open-air theater. A medicinal bath, a kindergarten and a pension were included. Of all that, only the existing four-structure complex was realized, and only after the maior visited the site to see that most of the reduced project had already been built and would not require much further work. In the end, about 2 million Reichsmark were spent.

In the years that followed, attendances reached record highs, as Berliners wanted to see their new public bath. On the other hand, with Nazism growing, fights between various political groups, as well as the staff, damaged the reputation of the lido as well as that of the director, Hermann Clajus, who had been in this position since 1926 and was responsible for the continued development of the site. The Nazis especially disliked the "un-german" architecture. A sign forbidding Jews to access the premises disappeared during the Olympics in 1936, but from 1938 on, Jews were by law prohibited to enter. The non-nazi staff was replaced by party members, and entertainment was provided by bands of the Wehrmacht and the SA. In 1935, the communal corporation that had conducted business since 1926 was disbanded, and management of the business first went into responsibility of borough of Wilmersdorf, then, after an administrative reform in 1937, that of Zehlendorf.

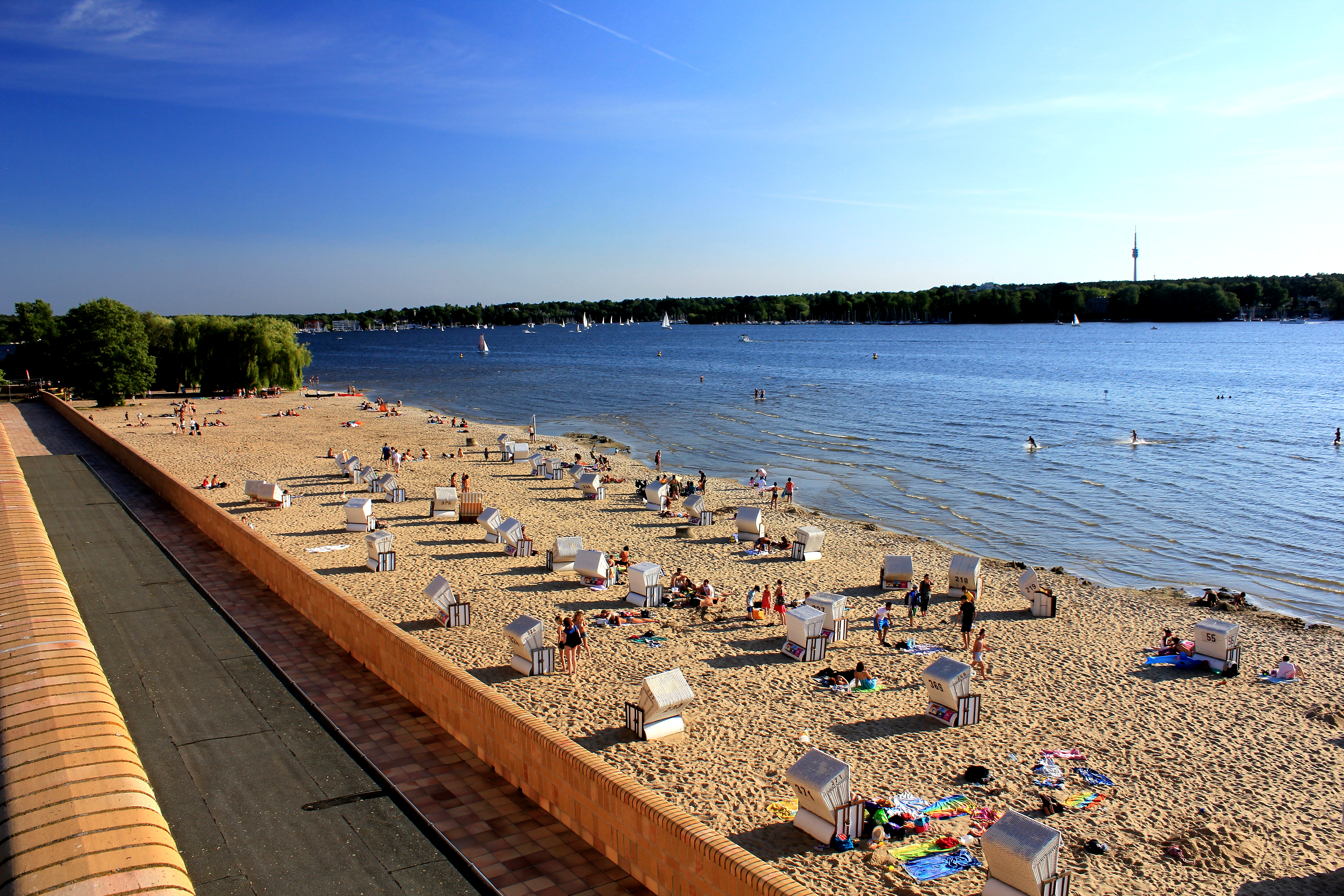
Beach life

During the Second World War, the lido provided welcome relief during dark times to the Berlin population that was still allowed to use it. Attendance still reached 425,000 in 1944. Luckily, the buildings were not destroyed during the war. After the war it provided an escape from devastation and debris. In 1947, again 615,000 people pay their fee, and in 1951, Conny Froboess sang Pack die Badehose ein (literally 'Pack your swimming trunks), one of the great hits of that time.

Rarely during its existence had the lido to close. Some closures occurred during the Berlin Blockade, when due to power outages the waste pumps had to shut off and the waste would have soiled the lake. Later, in 1952, the danger presented by live gunfire from a nearby US-forces shooting range caused another closure.

In later years, attendance dropped. New public baths competed for attention, the buildings deteriorated, increasing wealth allowed citizens to travel further than just to the Wannsee, and finally public transport by bus ceased, forcing people to walk from Nikolassee station or to compete for a lot in the limited parking area. In 2004, under the management of the Stiftung Denkmalschutz Berlin, restoration of the buildings and infrastructure began with the declared goal of restoring conditions to the original as accurately as possible and updating the antiquated equipment. The restoration included the recreation of the forecourt in front of the entrance to the lido. As the whole ensemble is listed, and not just the building, maintenance requires not only care for the construction, but also for the surrounding open and forest areas. Due to financial restraints, not all of the buildings have been fully restored: notably the former restaurant, aptly named "Lido", is still in its old derelict state.

== Buildings ==
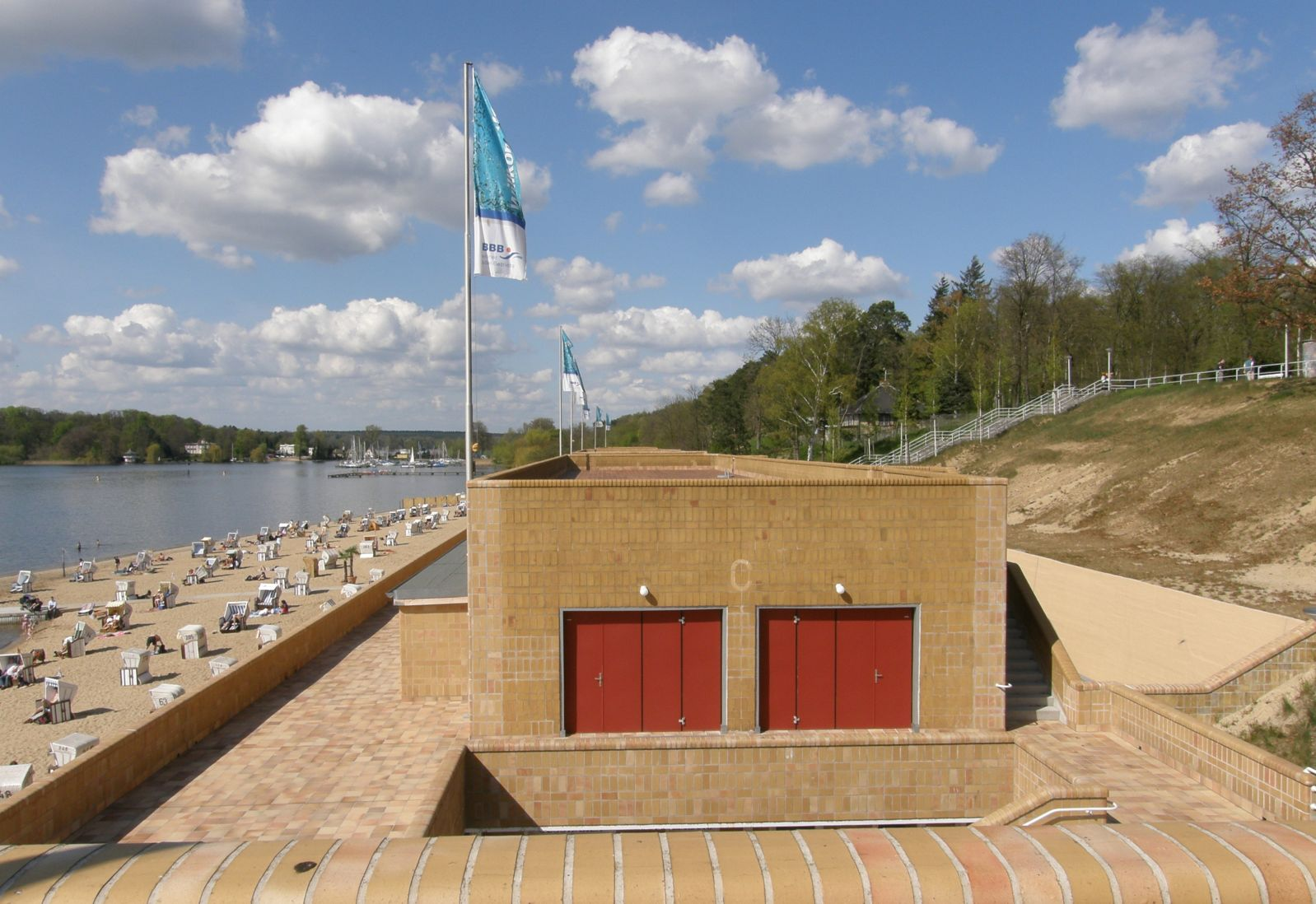
Cabin section

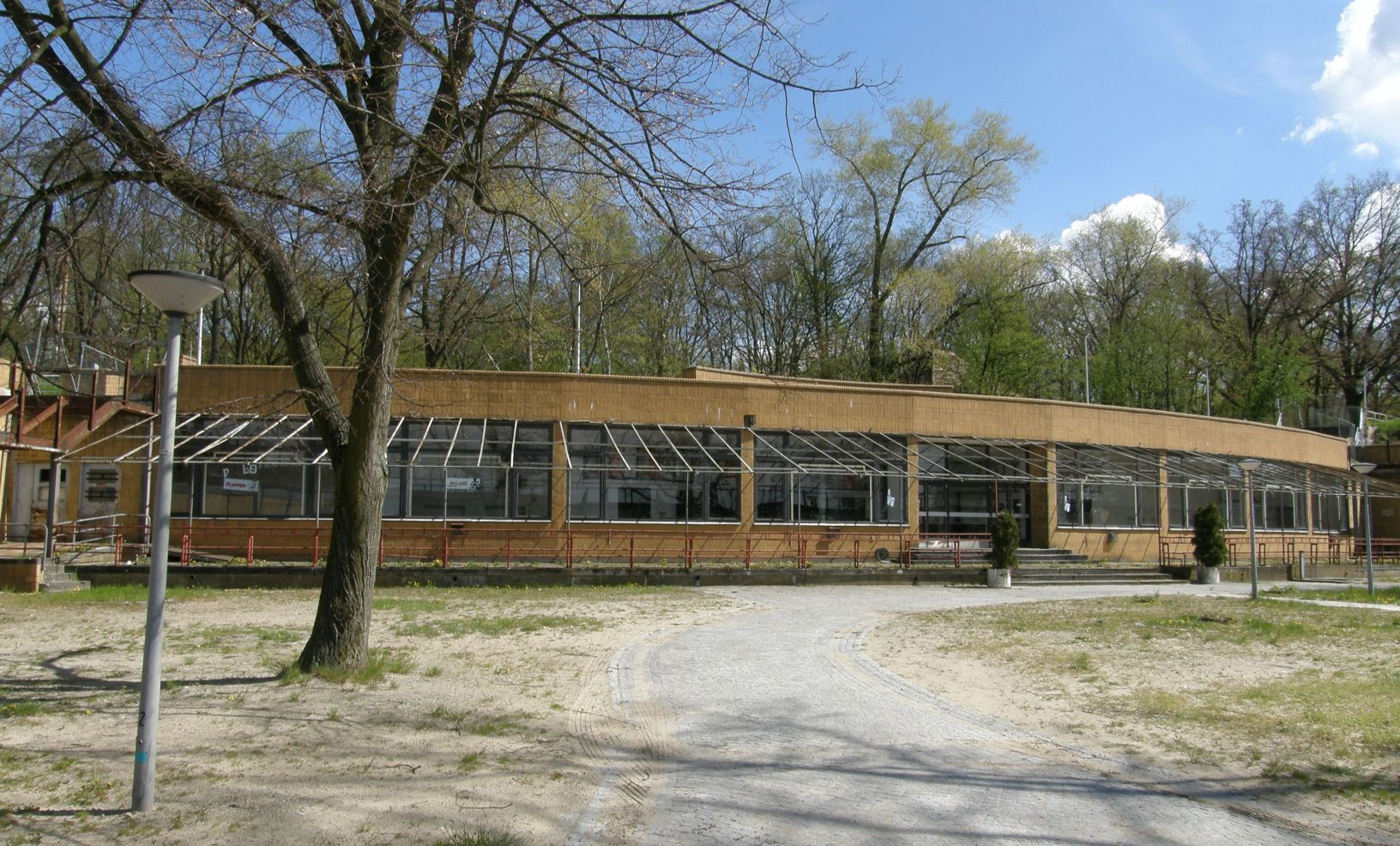
Former beach front café

The buildings that R. Ermisch planned in the late 1920s were built in the style of New Objectivity. This called for simple, functional and unadorned structures and aesthetics deriving from the materials that were used rather than ornaments. For the Strandbad Wannsee, preferred material for facades is yellow clinker, the bricks lending the complex its characteristic hue.

The complex consists of four large two-storeyed buildings, arranged in a row along and close to the hill flank parallel to the beach line. Construction is steel framework filled with clinker. The row of uniform structures is articulated by staircases between the individual buildings. They are connected by a closed-roof colonnade in front of them, providing a view of the lake and river. The roofs could be used as sun terraces. From a small balcony on that colonnade, lost children were announced before the invention of public address systems. Originally, the showers were located on the roof of the colonnade as well.

In the 1930s, a restaurant on the premises, called "Wannseeterrassen" (Wannsee terraces) was erected in a manner that intentionally contrasted the modern designs by Ermisch with a more traditionally styled structure.
