= Richard Ermisch =

German painter

Georg Friedrich Richard Ermisch
- Born: 17 June 1885; Halle, Saxony-Anhalt, Germany
- Died: 7 December 1960 (aged 75); Berlin, Germany
- Occupation: Architect
- Buildings: Messe Berlin, Berlin. Strandbad Wannsee

Richard Ermisch (full name: Georg Friedrich Richard Ermisch) (17 June 1885, Halle an der Saale, Saxony-Anhalt – 7 December 1960, Berlin) was a German architect, painter and graphic designer. From 1903 to 1906, he attended the 'Königliche Preußische Baugewerkschule' at Erfurt. For a short time, he worked with Karl Doflein in Berlin, and from 1907 to 1922 at the municipal building control office in Charlottenburg, which was an independent city until 1920. Afterwards, he was employed at the municipal construction office of Berlin until he retired in 1950. In between, he became Baurat (building control office surveyor) in 1921, Oberbaurat in 1929, later Magistratsbaurat and finally Stadtbaudirektor, head of the Berlin municipal building office.

His most notable buildings are the main building with the entry hall at the Berlin fairgrounds in 1936 and the Strandbad Wannsee, with fellow architect Martin Wagner, in 1929–1930, where he developed a row of long, low buildings that appear to grow out of the underlying sandhills. Further buildings include several housing projects in Spandau and the Tiergarten city hall in 1935–1936. After World War II, together with Karl Bonatz he presented a plan for the rebuilding of Berlin.

== Gallery ==
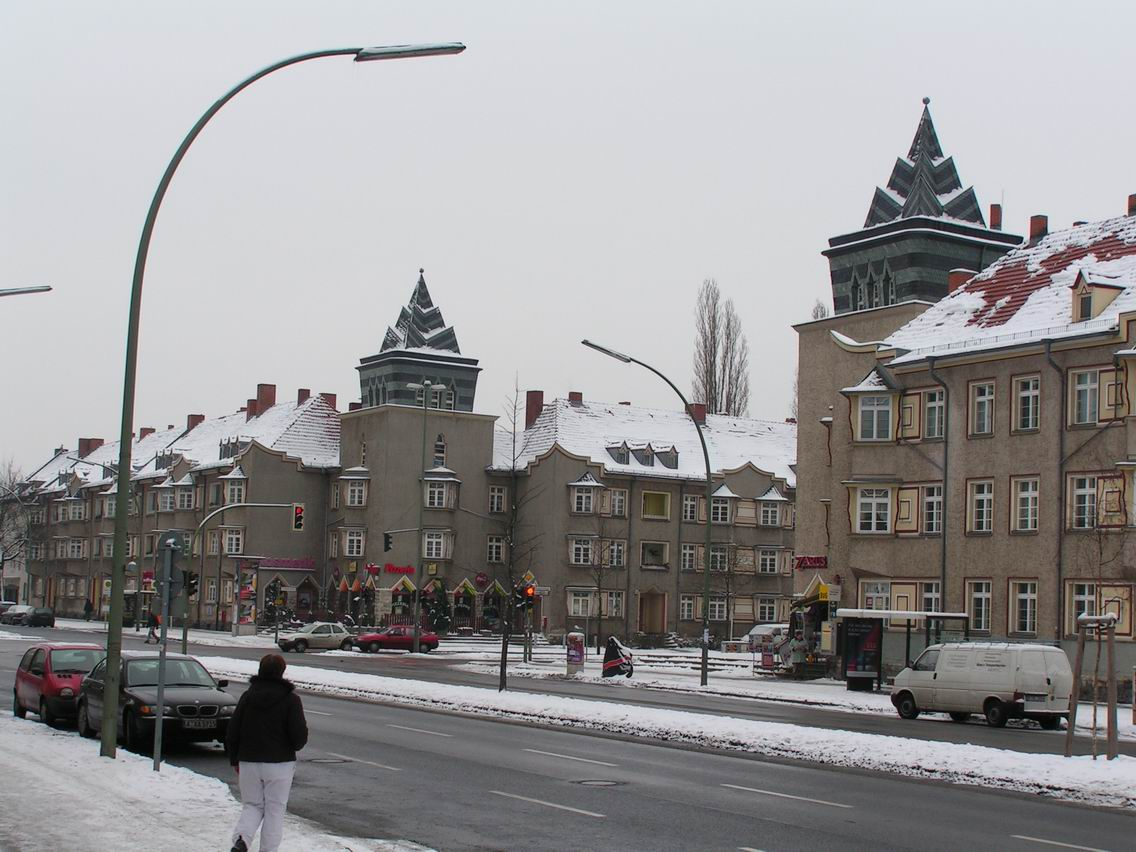
Housing project, Zeppelinstraße, Spandau, 1926/27

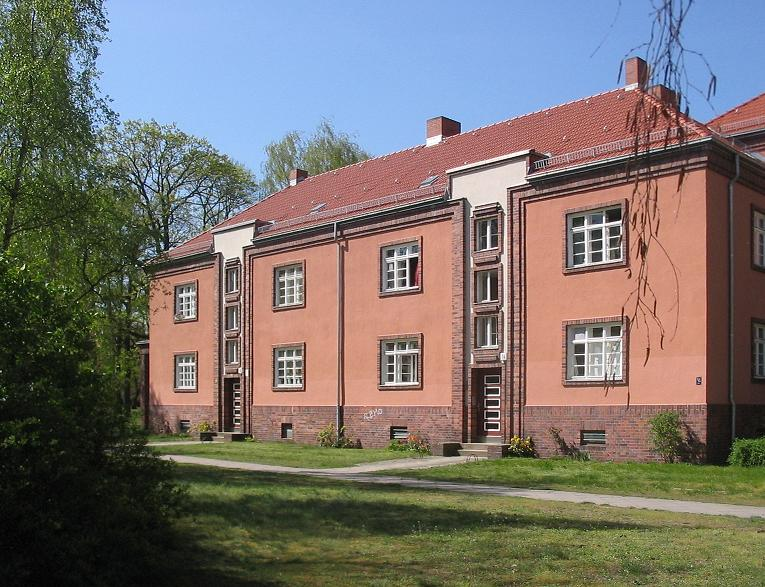
Siedlung Birkenwäldchen, residential area in Berlin-Wilhelmstadt, 1926/28

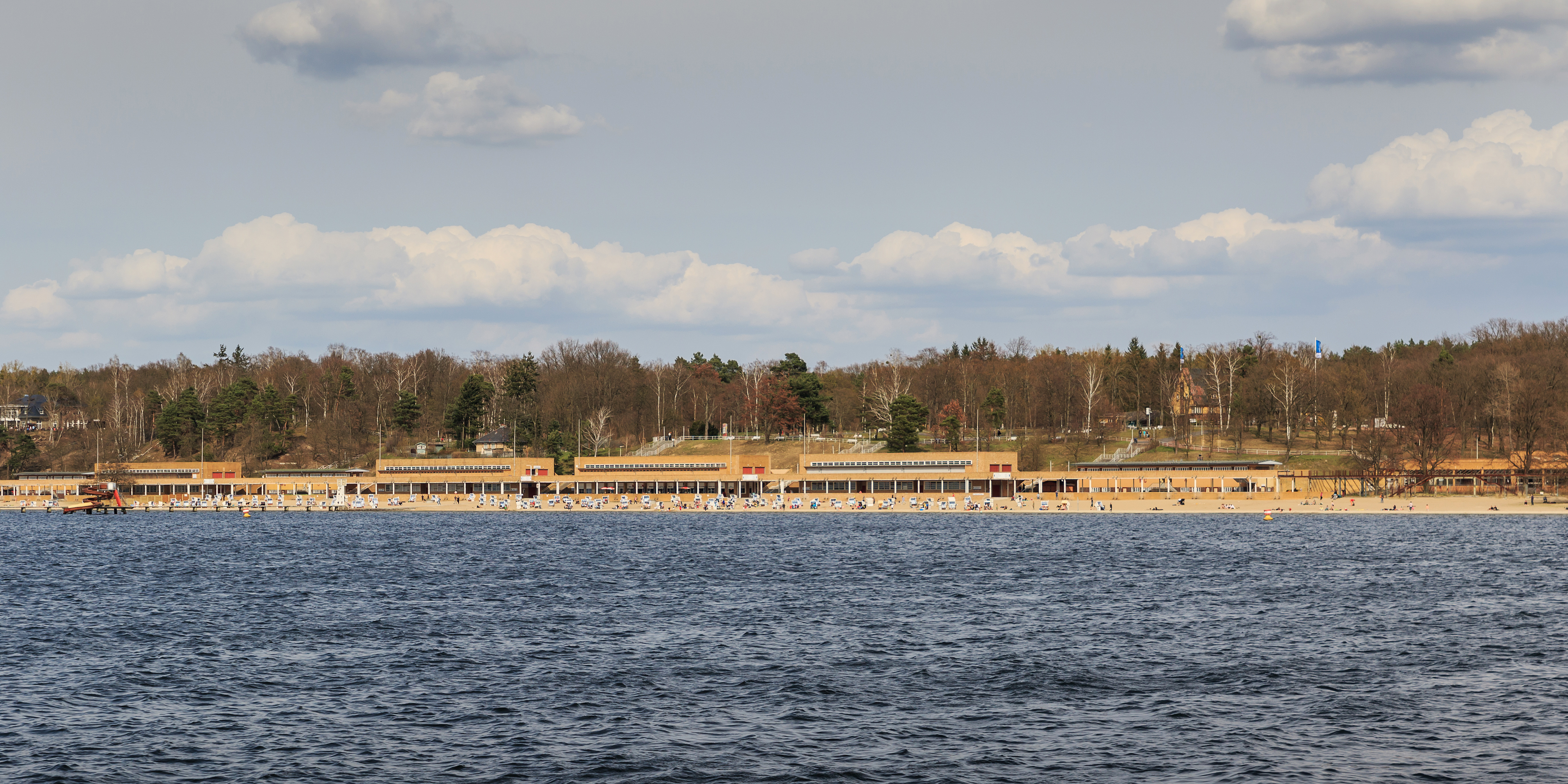
Strandbad Wannsee, 1929/30

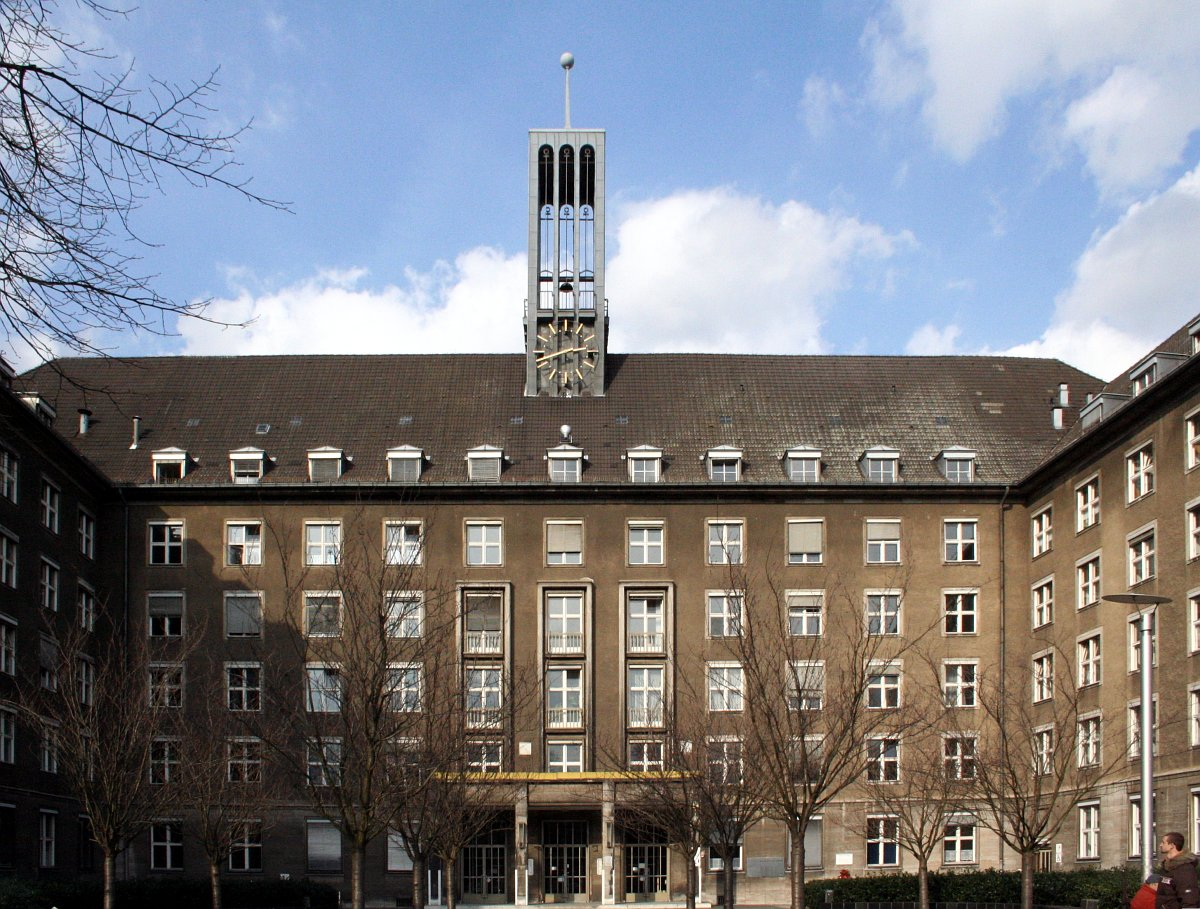
Tiergarten city hall, 1935/36

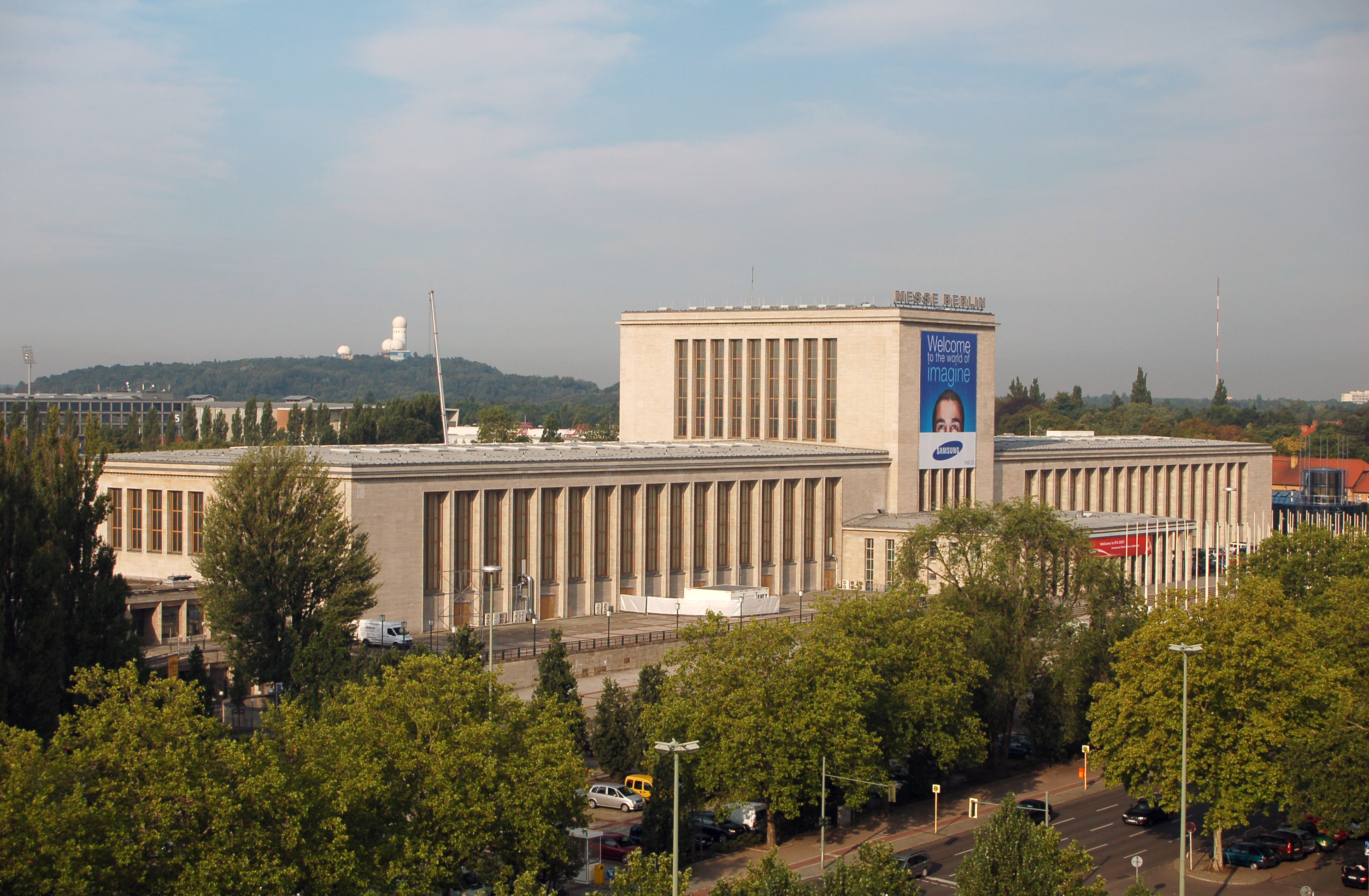
Messe Berlin: Main building with entry hall, 1935/37

== See also ==
- List of German painters
