= St. George's Anglican Church =

St. George's Anglican Church may refer to:

== Australia ==
- St George's Anglican Church, Battery Point, Hobart, Tasmania
- St George's Anglican Church, Beenleigh, Queensland
- St George's Anglican Church, Crows Nest, Queensland
- St George's Anglican Church, Brassall, Queensland
- St George's Anglican Church, Eumundi, Queensland
- St George's Anglican Church, Linville, Queensland
- St George's Anglican Church, Queenscliff, Victoria
- St George's Anglican Church, Bluff Point, Western Australia
- St George's Cathedral, Perth, Western Australia

== Canada ==
- Saint George's Anglican Church (Moncton), New Brunswick
- St. George's Anglican Church, Sibbald Point, Ontario
- St. George's Anglican Church, St. Catharines, Ontario
- St George's Anglican Church, WIllowdale, Toronto, Ontario
- St. George's Anglican Church, Sutton West, Ontario
- St. George's Memorial Church (Oshawa), Ontario
- St. George's Church (Georgetown, Ontario), an Anglican church in Ontario
- St. George' s Anglican Church, Brigus, Newfoundland and Labrador, Canada
- St. George's Anglican Church, Bathurst, New Brunswick
- St. George's Anglican Church (Parrsboro, Nova Scotia)
- St. George's (Round) Church (Halifax, Nova Scotia), an Anglican church
- St. George's Anglican Church (Montreal), Quebec

== Spain ==
- St George's Anglican Church, Barcelona, Spain
- St George's Anglican Church, Madrid
- St George’s Anglican Church, Málaga
- St George's Anglican Church, British Embassy in Madrid

== United Kingdom ==
- St George's Church, Everton, Merseyside, England
- St George's Church, Gravesend, an Anglican church in Kent, England
- St George's Anglican Church, Hanover Square, Westminster, London, England
- St George's Anglican Church, Whatley, Somerset, England
- St George's Anglican Church, Kendal, Cumbria, England
- St George's Anglican Church, Georgeham, Devon, England

== United States ==
- St. George's Anglican Church, Ventura, California
- St. George's Anglican Church, Colorado Springs, Colorado
- St. George's Anglican Church, Helmetta, New Jersey

== Other ==
- St. George's Anglican Church, Knokke, Belgium
- St. George's Church, Vernet-les-Bains, an Anglican church in Pyrénées-Orientales, France
- St. George's Anglican Church, Berlin, Germany
- St. George's Anglican Church, Grenada
- St. George's Cathedral, Georgetown, Guyana
- St. George's Anglican Church, Chennai, India
- St. George's Cathedral, Jerusalem, an Anglican cathedral in Jerusalem
- St George's Church, Venice, an Anglican church in Italy
- St. George's Church, Penang, an Anglican church in Penang, Malaysia
- St. George's Anglican Church, Lisbon, the English-speaking Anglican congregation in Lisbon, Portugal
- St. George's Anglican Church (Basseterre), Saint Kitts and Nevis
- St. George's Cathedral, Cape Town, South Africa

== See also ==
- St George's Church (disambiguation)
- St. Mary & St. George Anglican Church, Alberta, Canada
