= Monbijou Palace =

Castle in Berlin, Germany

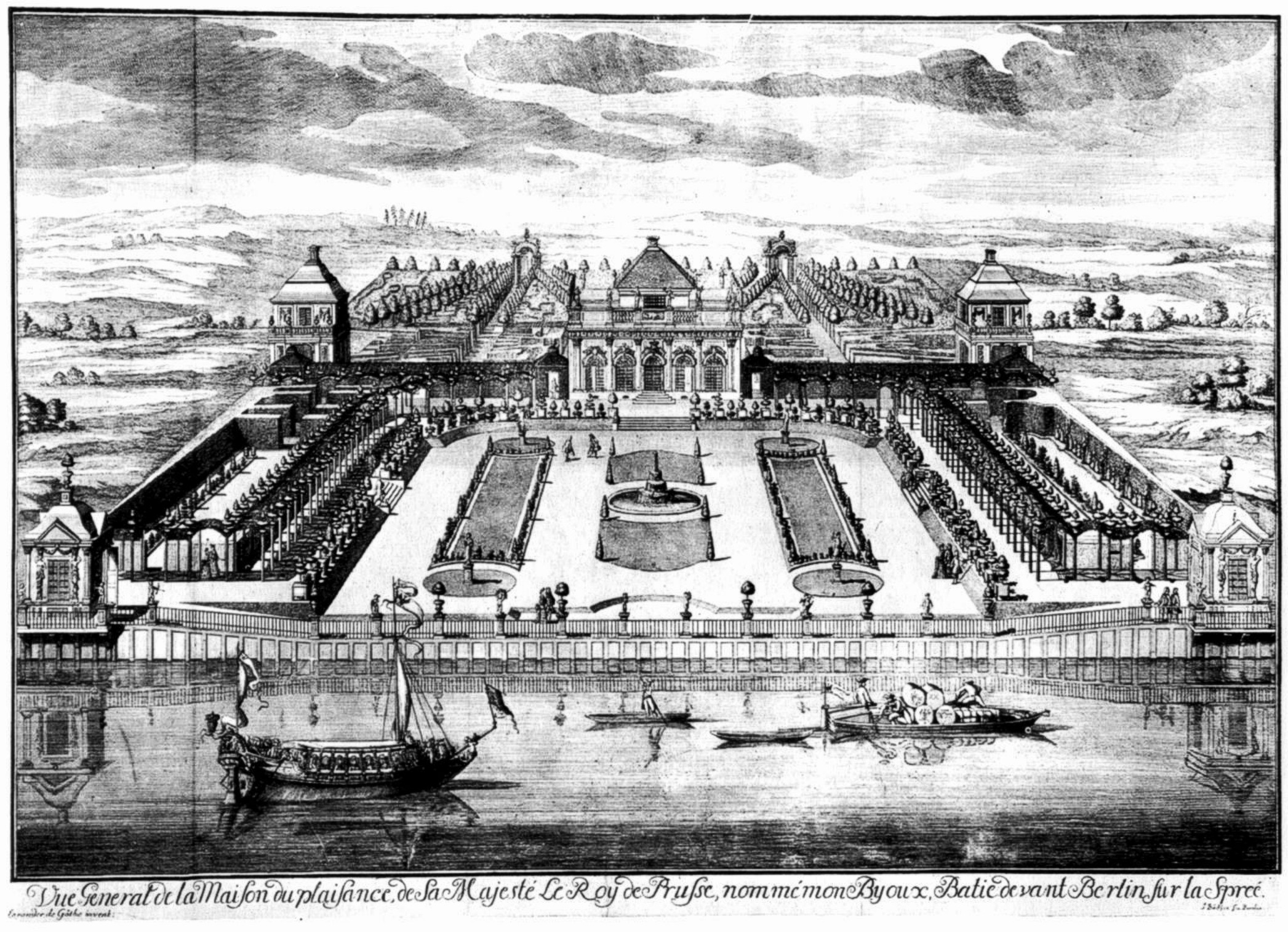
- Engraving of Monbijou Palace (1703) by Johann Christoph Böcklin

- Location within Berlin Monbijou Palace (Germany)
- Alternative names: Hohenzollern Stadtschloss, Monbijou Castle, Schloss Monbijou

General information
- Architectural style: Rococo, late-Baroque
- Coordinates: 52°31′23″N 13°23′49″E
- Completed: 1706
- Demolished: 1959

Design and construction
- Architect: Eosander von Göthe

Monbijou Palace was a Rococo palace in central Berlin located in the present-day Monbijou Park on the north bank of the Spree river across from today's Bode Museum and within sight of the Hohenzollern city palace. Heavily damaged in World War II, the ruins were finally razed by the authorities of East Berlin in 1959. The palace has not been rebuilt.

== Beginnings ==
In the Middle Ages the site was outside the city walls on the road to Spandau and contained a manor farmstead of the prince-elector of Brandenburg. The entire area was devastated in the Thirty Years' War.

In 1649, Frederick William I, Elector of Brandenburg, popularly known as the Great Elector (Der Große Kurfürst) for his military and political skills, ordered the property to be re-cultivated and presented it to his first consort, Countess Louise Henriette of Nassau. With great dedication she established there an exemplary rural estate including crops and dairy farming following the Dutch model. The first potatoes in the Margraviate of Brandenburg were grown there as an ornamental plant and curiosity. After Henriette's death in 1667 the property went to the elector's second wife, Sophia Dorothea of Schleswig-Holstein-Sonderburg-Glücksburg. She added a garden with a small summer house, the nucleus of the future palace and grounds. Frederick I, who became Elector of Brandenburg on the death of his father in 1688 and King in Prussia in 1701, decided to expand the estate.

Count von Wartenberg, his chief minister and favorite, was the developer of a "pleasure house", a small palace of just 400 square meters, erected by the royal architect Eosander von Göthe between 1703 and 1706 in a late Baroque style. Friedrich I presented it to Countess Wartenberg, his mistress.

== Residence of queens ==
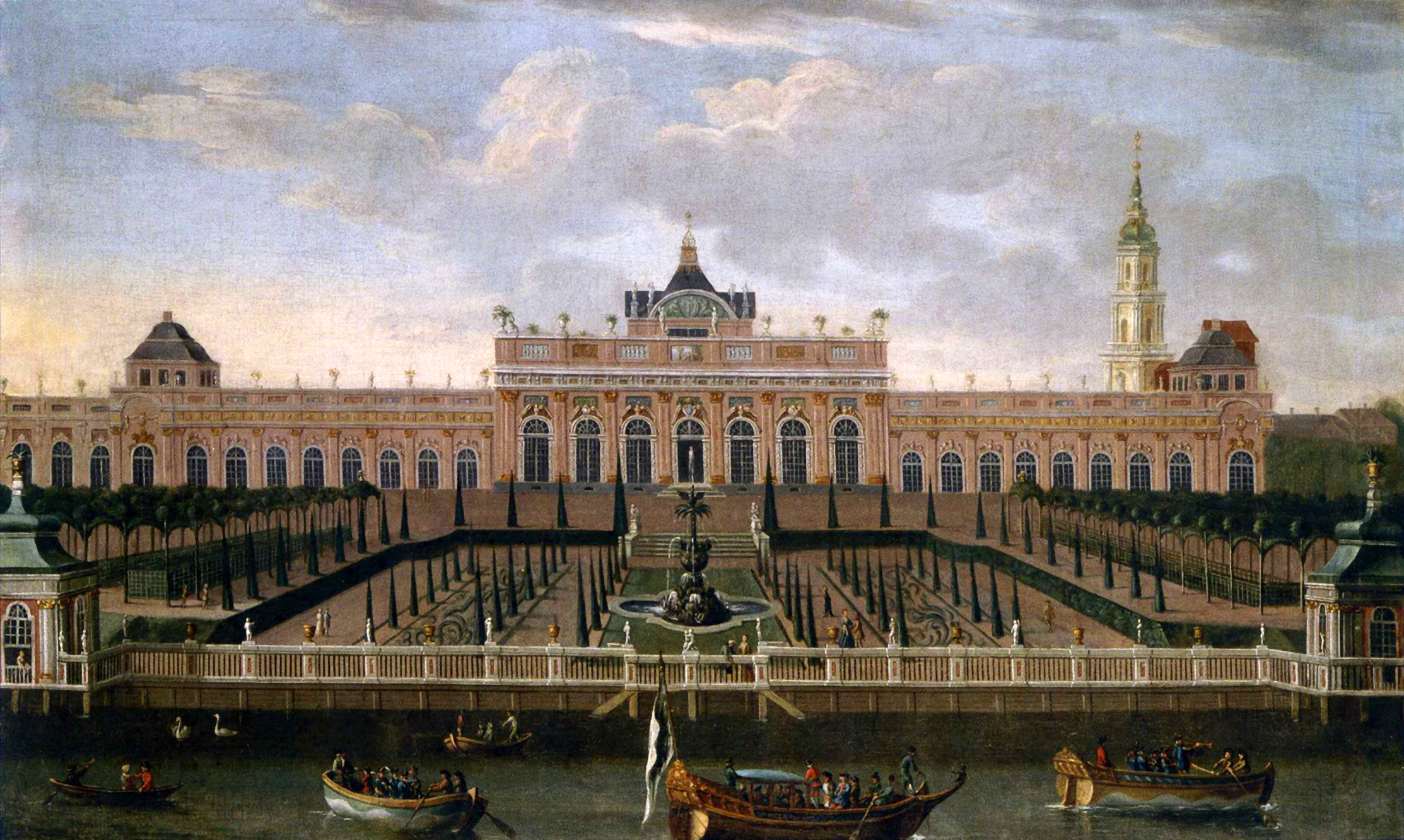
Monbijou Palace, riverside, oil on canvas, about 1739 (with Sophienkirche tower in the background)

From 1712 the little palace served as the summer residence of Sophia Dorothea of Hanover, who in 1706 married Frederick William I of Prussia, the son and successor of Frederick I. Both she and her father-in-law are attributed with naming the palace "Monbijou", from the French mon bijou ("my jewel"). In 1717 tsar Peter the Great of Russia and his court lodged at Monbijou for two days while traveling abroad. According to contemporary reports, the Russian guests left the property in "a complete mess" after their departure. Dorothea's son, Frederick the Great, had the palace modernized and considerably enlarged as soon as he had acceded to the throne. His architect, Georg Wenzeslaus von Knobelsdorff, superintendent of all royal buildings and architect of Sanssouci, had new extensions and outbuildings erected which extended the original size of the grounds by several times on the Spree river side. In 1742 the "Berlinische(n) Nachrichten" reported that the keys had been turned over to the queen mother, which "delighted her immensely". Dorothea spent the summer months at Monbijou, giving formal dinners, masquerade balls and concerts there, pleasures she had long done without under the Spartan reign of Frederick William I. The palace had its own jetty, since the court members often preferred to arrive in comfort via the waterways instead of being jarred over rough roads.

The palace was long uninhabited after the death of Queen Sophie Dorothea in 1757. In 1786 it became the chief residence of Queen Frederika Louisa of Hesse-Darmstadt, who had been humiliated by her husband, King Frederick William II of Prussia (popularly known as "Der Dicke Lüderjahn", "the portly voluptuary") because of his girth and his numerous affairs and two official bigamous morganatic marriages; a monumental gate by Georg Christian Unger was added during this period. The Queen died at Monbijou in 1805. After that, the palace had outlived its usefulness as a residence for members of the court. The Anglican congregation of Berlin began using a gatehouse of Monbijou Palace as the English Chapel from 1855. The chapel soon became too small for the services of the congregation, regularly attended by Princess Royal Victoria, Crown Princess of Prussia and the German Empire. In 1883 Crown Prince Frederick William and Victoria provided a site in the park of Monbijou Palace close to Monbijoustraße and the Domkandidatenstift. Julius Carl Raschdorff, who would later design Berlin's Supreme Parish and Collegiate Church, was commissioned to develop the plans for an Anglican church, completed in 1885 and named St. George's Church.

== Hohenzollern Museum ==
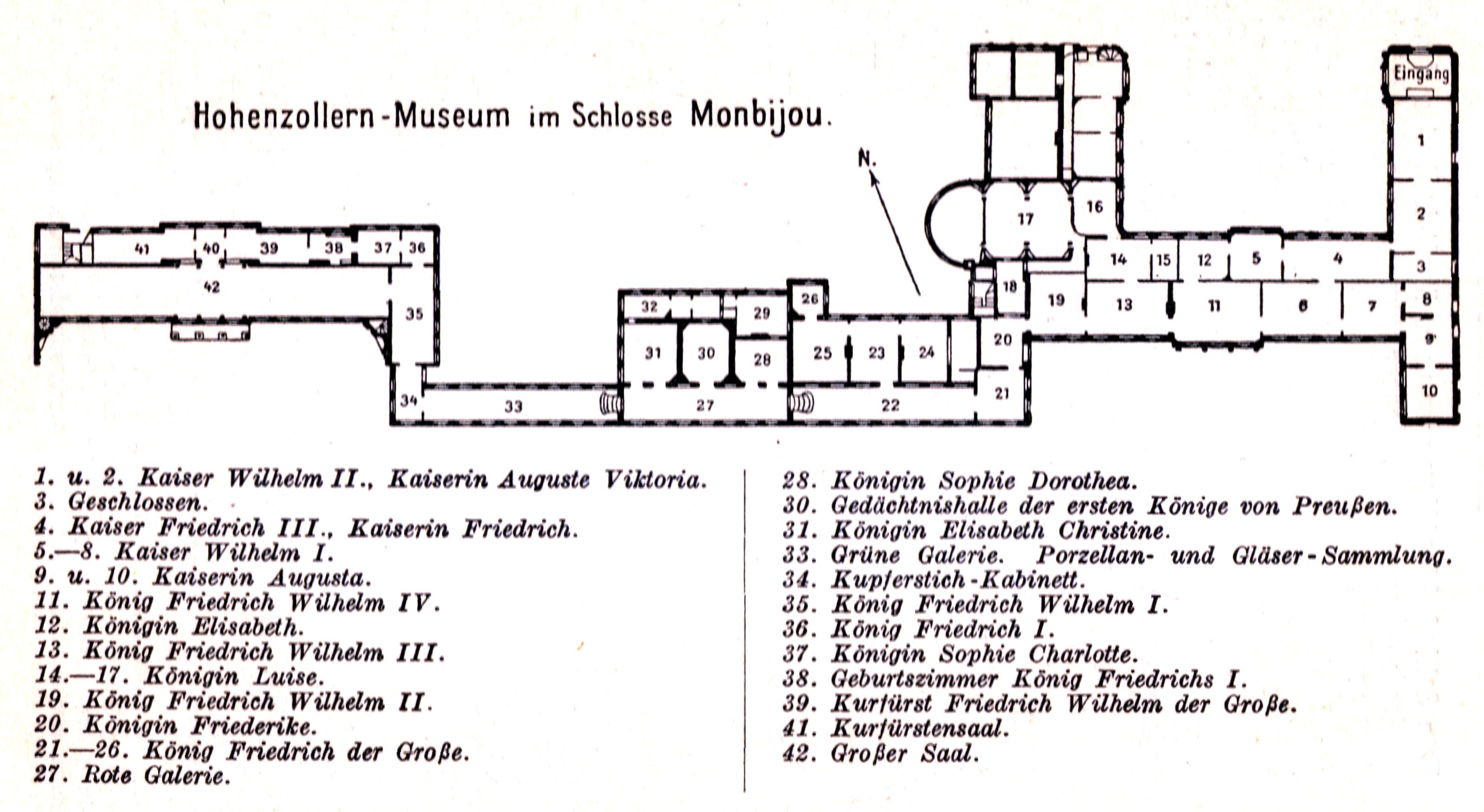
Floor plan of the Hohenzollern Museum, 1904

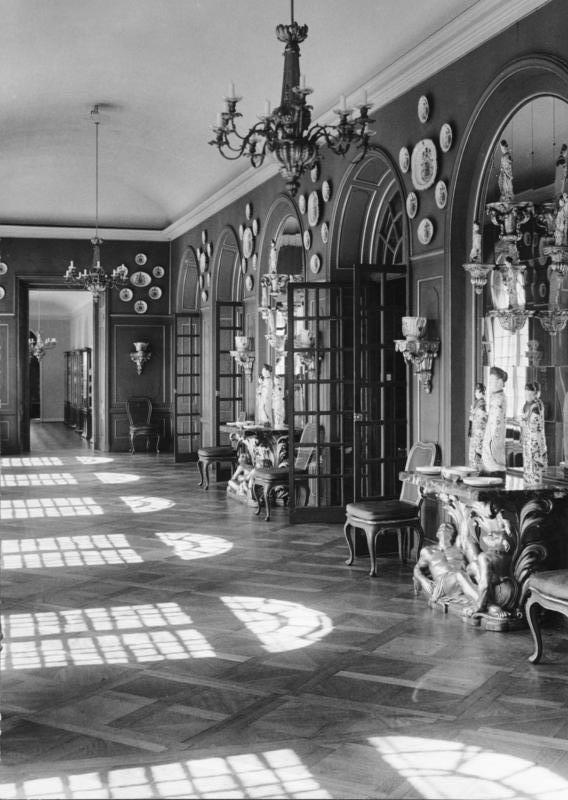
Museum interior view (room 27), undated

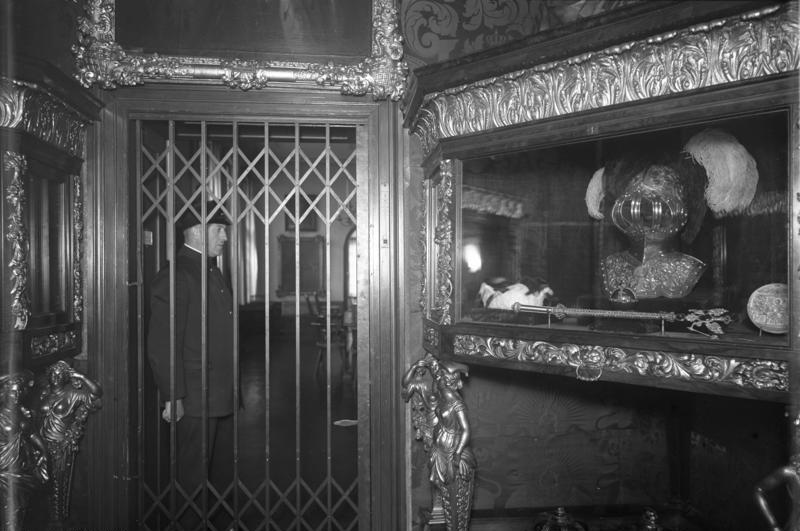
Prussian Crown Jewels in the Hohenzollern Museum, 1932

Around 1820, the so-called "Germanic-Slavic Antiquities" were removed from the royal curiosities cabinet (Kunstkammer) and housed in Monbijou Palace as the Museum for National Antiquities (Museum für Vaterländische Alterthümer). As the collections regularly expanded with the addition of new categories (paintings, jewelry, porcelain), the German emperor Wilhelm I finally made the palace with its 42 rooms accessible to the public as the "Hohenzollern Museum" in 1877. It was considered to be on the one hand an educational institution of cultural history, and on the other hand a place for the Hohenzollern dynasty to celebrate its own history and significance.

The museum survived the abolition of the monarchy in Germany in 1918. Its inventory remained in the possession of the dynasty but it was administered by the state, which made Monbijou Palace available for the purpose and assumed responsibility for maintaining the museum in the traditional way. World War II brought this state of affairs to an end. Large parts of the collections had been evacuated, and after the war were looted and brought to the Soviet Union and other places.

As late as 1940/41 Albert Speer, Adolf Hitler's favored architect, proposed relocating the palace in order to make space for three new museum buildings across from the Museum Island—as part of the planning for the monumental Welthauptstadt Germania ("World Capital Germania") project. Monbijou castle was to be completely pulled down and rebuilt in the park of Charlottenburg Palace between the nearby Spree sluice and the Berlin Ringbahn. The war made these plans irrelevant.

== War damage and demolition ==
As a precaution, all the palace windows had already been bricked up in 1940, but the entire building was gutted during an air raid in November 1943 and almost entirely destroyed. The ruins were left in place until 1959, when the East Berlin Magistrate—against the strenuous objection of museum professionals and parts of the West Berlin public— ordered the final demolition, apparently out of an ideological motivation similar to what prompted the breakup of the likewise heavily damaged Hohenzollern city palace in 1950. Only a few names remain as testimony to the former existence of the palace: On the grounds between Oranienburger Straße and the Spree there is a shady refuge of three hectares with a children's open-air swimming pool, today's Monbijou Park. Nearby there is a Monbijou Square, a Monbijou Street, and a Monbijou Bridge for pedestrians connecting both banks of the Spree at the north end of Museum Island.

== See also ==
- List of castles in Berlin and Brandenburg
