= Monbijou Park =

Park in Berlin, Germany

Monbijoupark
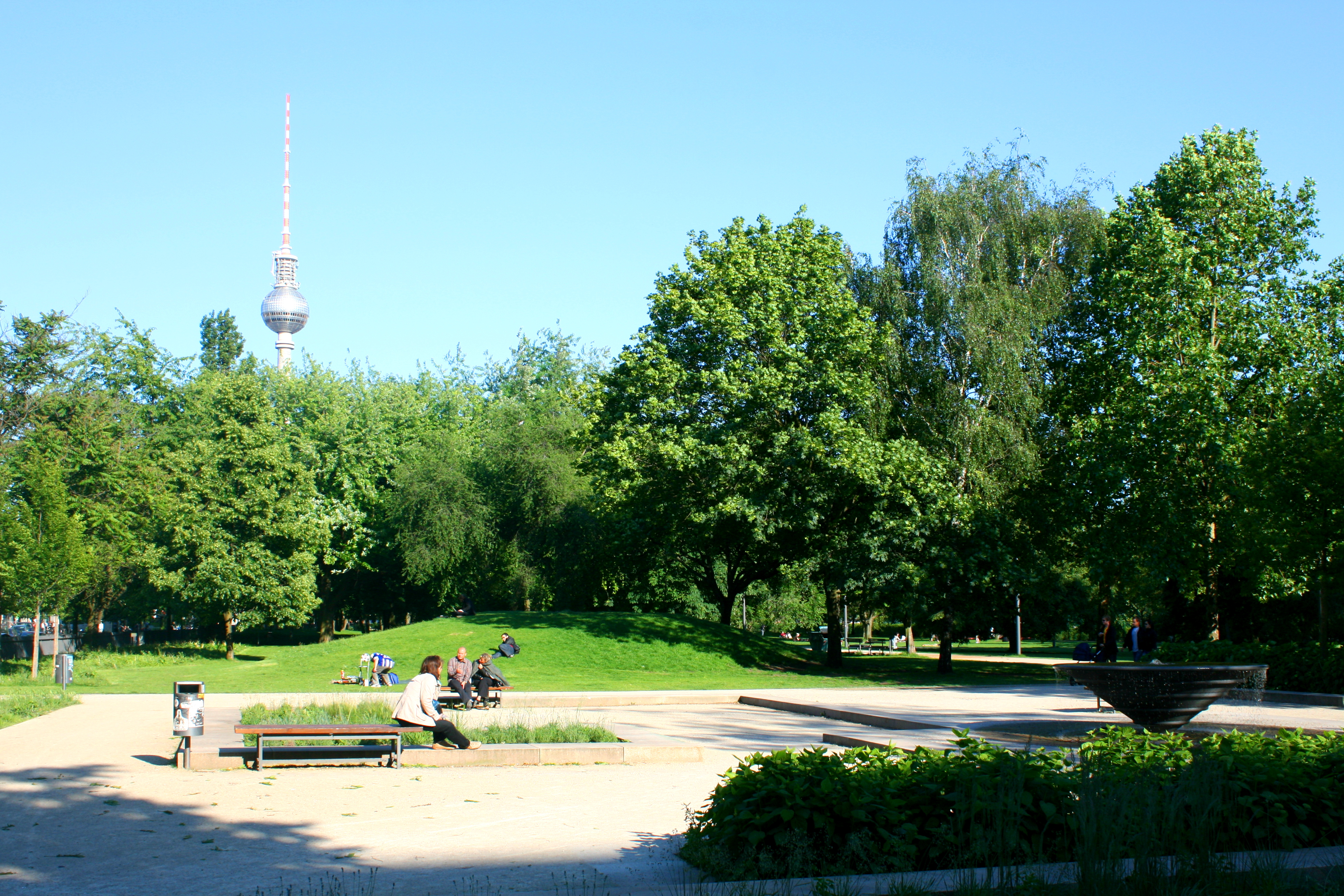
- View into Monbijou Park

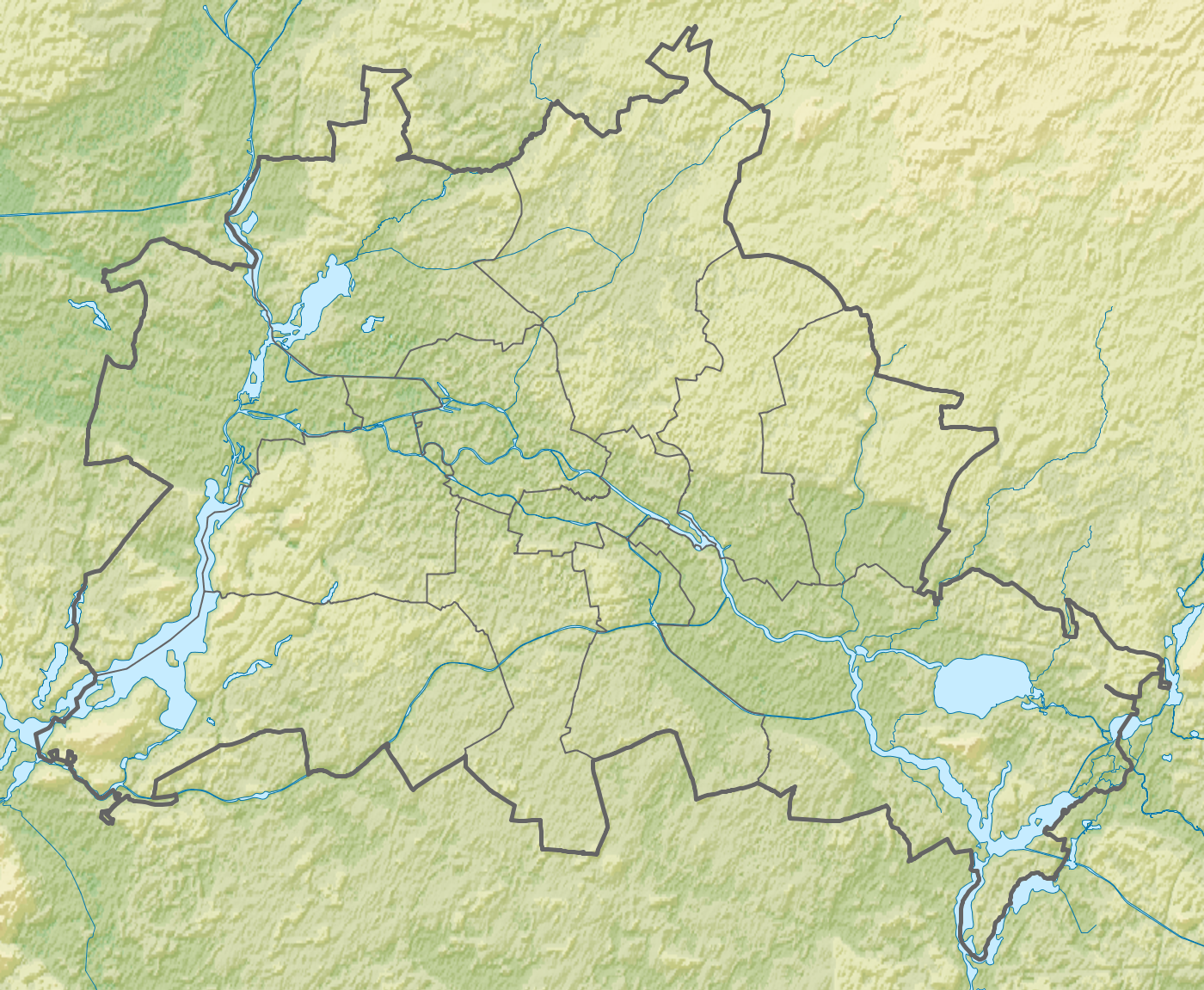
- Location within Central Berlin Location within Berlin Location within Germany
- Type: Urban park
- Location: Mitte, Berlin, Germany
- Coordinates: 52.5231°N 13.3969°E
- Area: 4 hectares (9.9 acres)
- Open: Open year-round

Monbijou Park is a park in Mitte, a district of Berlin, Germany. The park is bounded to the south by the river Spree, to the west by Monbijoustraße, and to the north Oranienburger Straße and Monbijouplatz. It is close to the Friedrichstadt Palast, Neue Synagogue and the Sophienkirche.

== Overview ==
The park has an open-air swimming pool for children. It is a much needed, "shady refuge from the unrelentingly urban landscape of the area". A foot bridge connects the park with the Museuminsel (Museum Island), close to the Bode Museum and Pergamon Museum. There is a bust of poet Adelbert von Chamisso.

== History ==
The park is situated on the former grounds of Monbijou Palace (Monbijouschloss) and the old English Church of St. George, both of which were heavily damaged during World War II and finally razed in 1959 by the East German authorities.

From 2006 to 2007, the park was redesigned according to plans by garden and landscape architects Lützow 7 from Berlin.
