= St. George's Anglican Church, Berlin =

Anglican church

St. George's Church
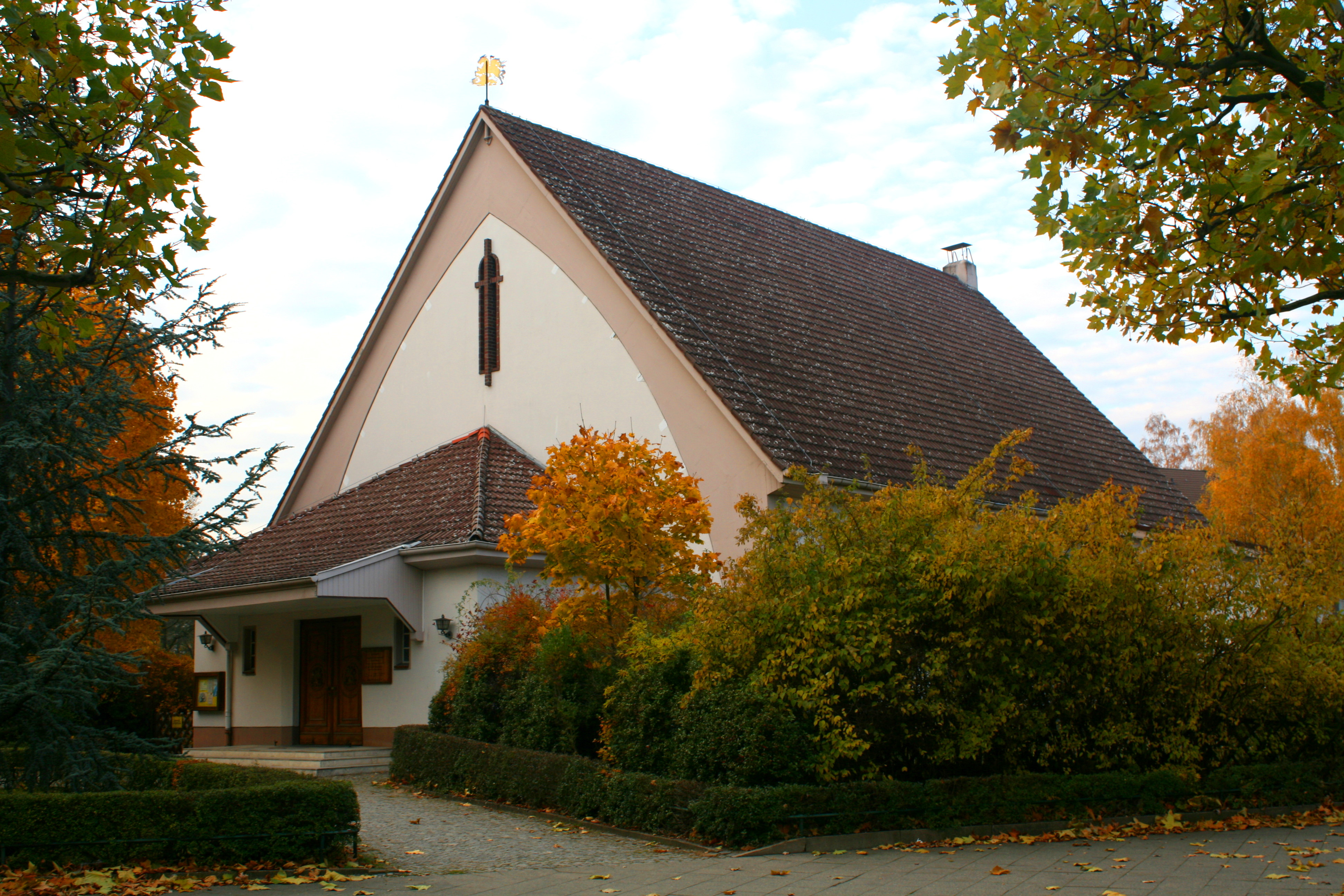
- The new St. George's Church, seen from southeast

Religion
- Affiliation: Anglican
- District: Diocese of Gibraltar in Europe
- Province: Canterbury
- Leadership: Rev. Canon Christopher Jage-Bowler
- Year consecrated: 1885 (1st building); 1950 (2nd building)

Location
- Location: Neu-Westend, a neighbourhood in the Westend locality of Berlin
- Interactive map of St. George's Church
- Coordinates: 52°30′44″N 13°15′31″E

Architecture
- Completed: 1885 (1st building); 1950 (2nd building)
- Construction cost: ℳ 130,000 (1885)
- Materials: Silesian granite and taylored glacial erratics (1885)

Website
- www.stgeorgesberlin.de

St. George's Church (Englische Kirche zu St. Georg between 1885 and 1944) is an Anglican church in Berlin, Germany, a parish of the Diocese in Europe of the Church of England. The original building was erected on Monbijou Park in 1885, but during the Second World War was destroyed in allied bombings. The original site on Oranienburger Straße happened to be in what had become the Soviet sector of Berlin in 1945 and was therefore abandoned and the ruins removed in 1949. In 1950, the congregation built a new church on the corner of Preußenallee and Badenallee in Neu-Westend, part of the Westend locality of Berlin in the British sector. The church served as the garrison church of the British Army during the Allied occupation, and reverted to civilian control in 1994.

== History ==
There had been Anglican worship in Berlin since at least 1830. From 1855 the Anglican congregation used a gatehouse at Monbijou Palace as the English Chapel. The chapel soon became too small for the services of the congregation, regularly attended by Princess Royal Victoria, Crown Princess of Prussia and the German Empire. In 1883 Crown Prince Frederick William and Victoria provided a site in the park of Monbijou Palace close to Monbijoustraße and the Domkandidatenstift. Julius Carl Raschdorff, who would later design Berlin's Supreme Parish and Collegiate Church, was commissioned to develop the plans for a church in close collaboration with Crown Princess Victoria and was sent to England on a study tour.

== Old St. George's Church, 1884–1949 ==
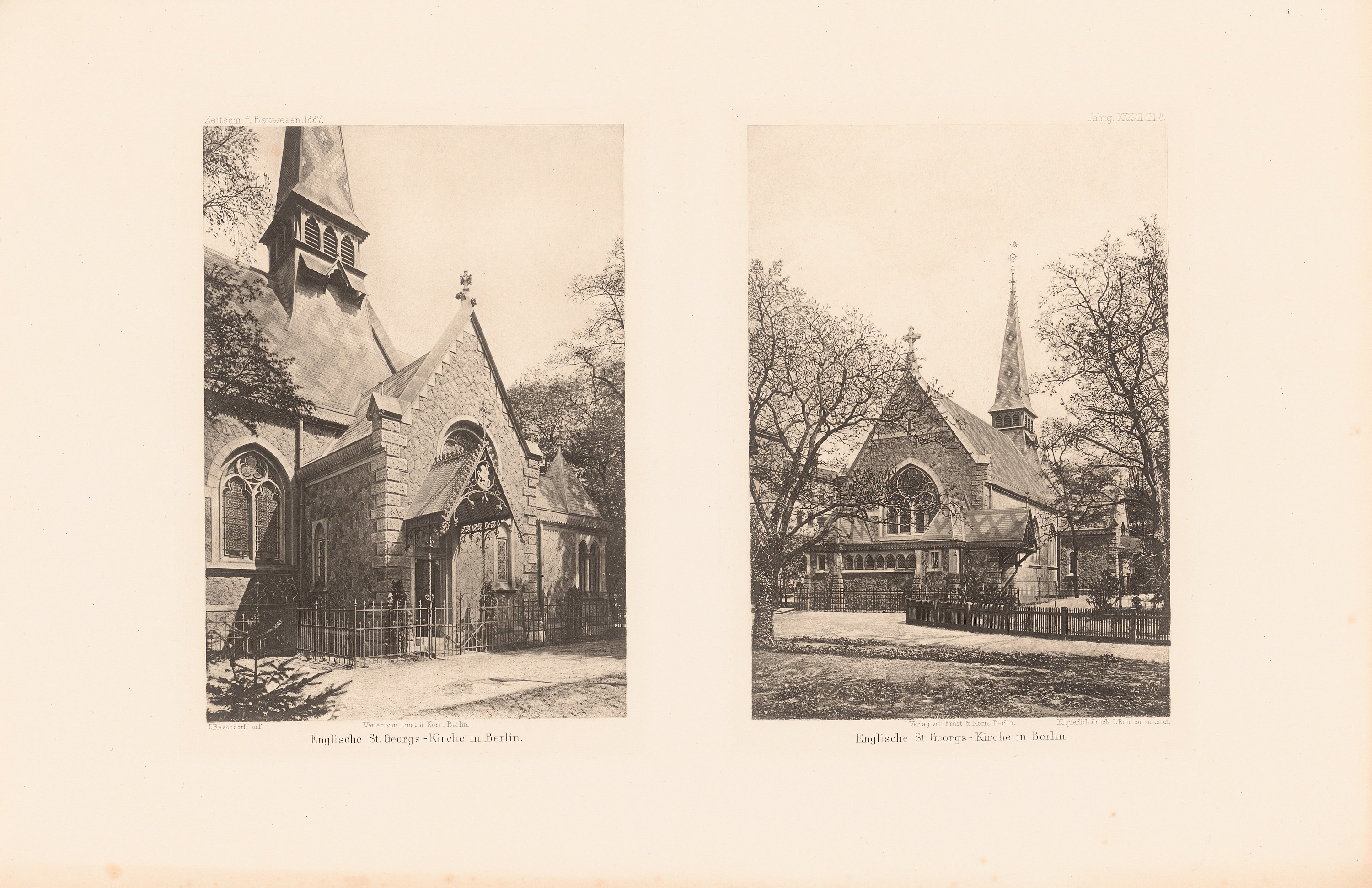
Old St. George’s Anglican Church im Monbijoupark, 1886

The church was built under the patronage of Crown Princess Victoria. The cornerstone was laid on 24 May 1884, Queen Victoria's birthday. The construction was financed through donations to the royal couple on the occasion of their silver wedding, with provision for a minister. The church was built of Silesian granite and glacial erratics, covered with a patterned slate roof cladding. British relatives of the princess donated the stained-glass windows. The church, seating 300, was inaugurated on 19 November 1885. The Kings of Prussia, who were also German Emperors, were the church's patrons. On their visits to Berlin, Queen Victoria and King George V visited the church in 1888 and 1913, respectively. During World War I it was the only Anglican Church in Germany which was allowed to remain open, thanks to William II who was then its patron.

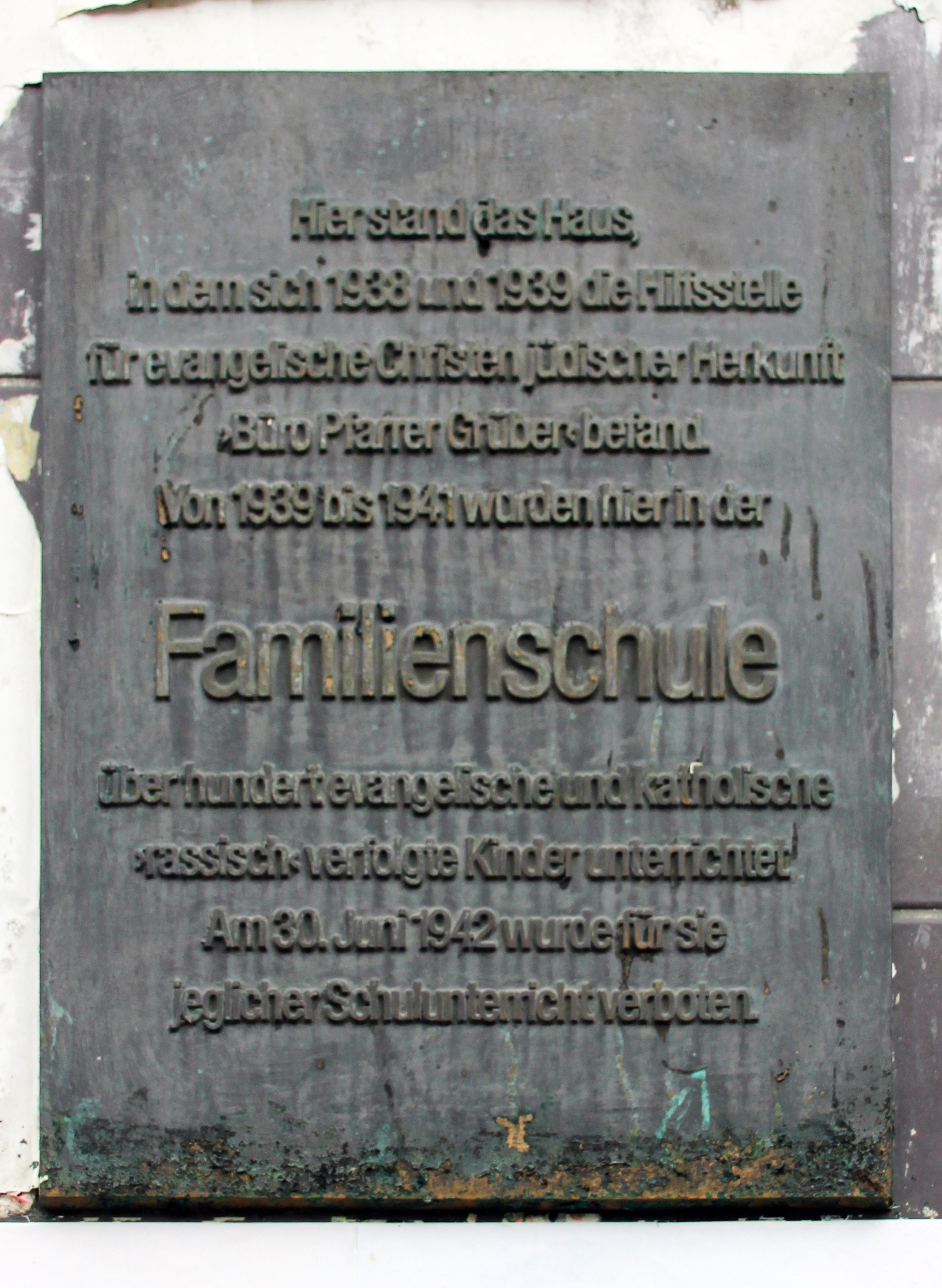
Plaque for the Grüber Bureau and its family school, opened 1939 for pupils expelled from state schools due to their Jewish descent

After the war the congregation developed not only for Britons but also for American, German, Indian, Chinese, Finnish and Russian Christians. In 1921, Charles Andrew Schönberger came to Germany and opened a branch of the Anglican Hebrew Christian Testimony to Israel in Berlin, opposite St. George's on Oranienburger Straße 20/21. A number of proselytes among the Jews of Berlin joined the Anglican congregation. When the Nazi persecution of Jews and even Jewish-born Christians (see Prussian Union of Churches § Protestants of Jewish descent) became more and more unbearable, the Hebrew Christian Testimony to Israel relinquished its premises on Oranienburger Straße to Heinrich Grüber's help organisation, Grüber Bureau, on 7 December 1938. The Grüber Bureau cooperated with Bishop George Bell, who had engaged his sister-in-law Laura Livingstone to run the Berlin office of the International Church Relief Commission for German Refugees. A plaque at the new building on Oranienburger Straße 20 commemorates the joint efforts of the Anglicans and the Confessing Church.

St. George's, which was closed after the outbreak of the Second World War, was hit by allied bombing in 1943 and 1944. The ruins of the church, which after 1945 was in the Soviet Sector of Berlin, were later demolished by the German Democratic Republic (GDR).

== New St. George's Church, 1950–present ==
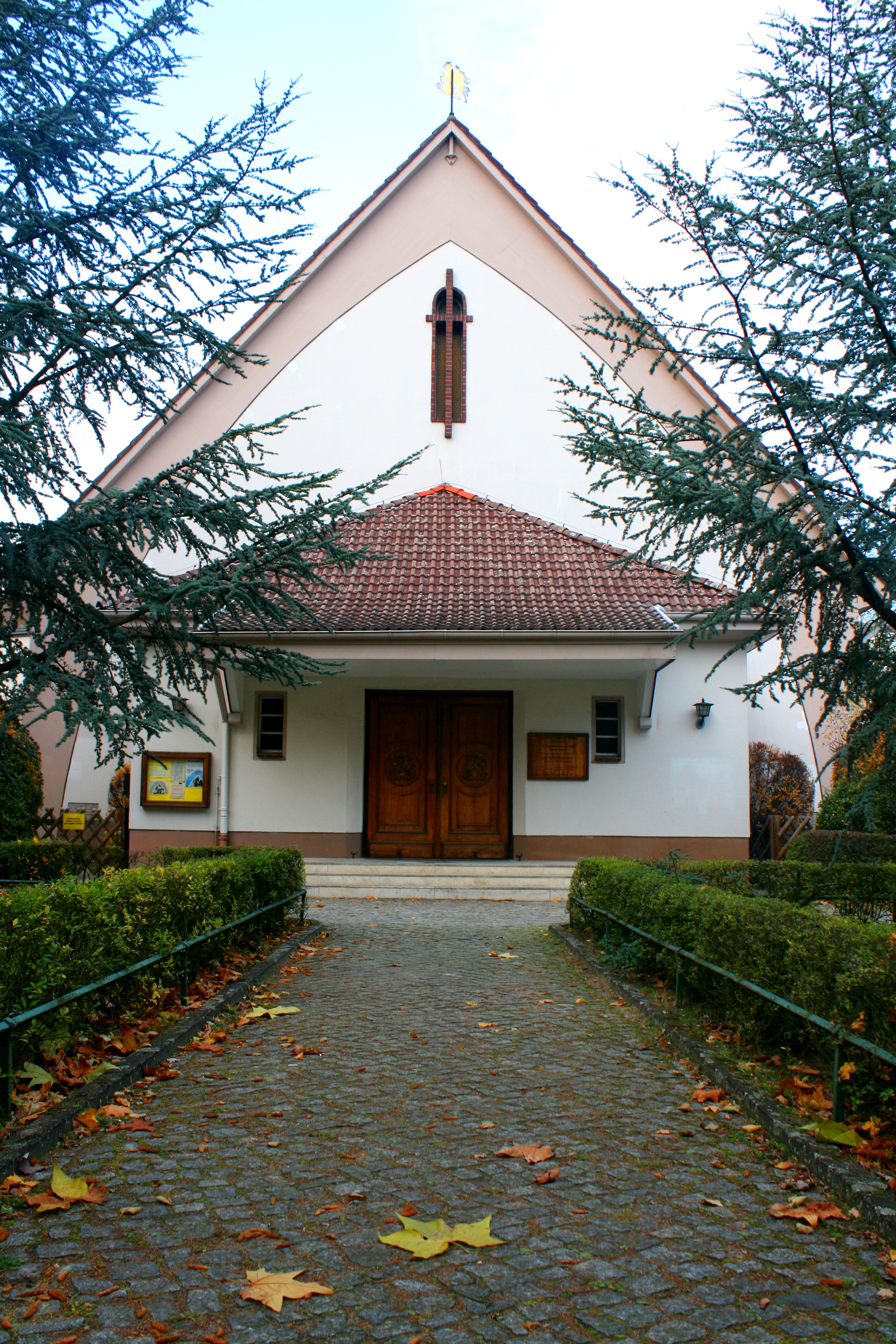
Entrance at the southern gable end of St. George's Church

After the war, the congregation consisted mostly of members of the British forces and administration stationed in Berlin. In 1950, a new St. George's Church was built by Korth and Stevens in the Neu-Westend neighbourhood in the British Sector as the garrison church of the British forces. From 1945 to 1954 the Lutheran congregation of Melanchthon Church on Wilhelmstraße, close to the Smuts Barracks, also hosted the British garrison church community. The pews of St. George's still bear the insignia of the British regiments once garrisoned in Berlin. In 1987 the original church silver, donated by Crown Princess Victoria, was discovered in a city cellar and has since been used for weekly worship. Since the British forces withdrew from Berlin in 1994, the church has been used by civilians.
