= Westend (Berlin) =

- Quarter of Berlin
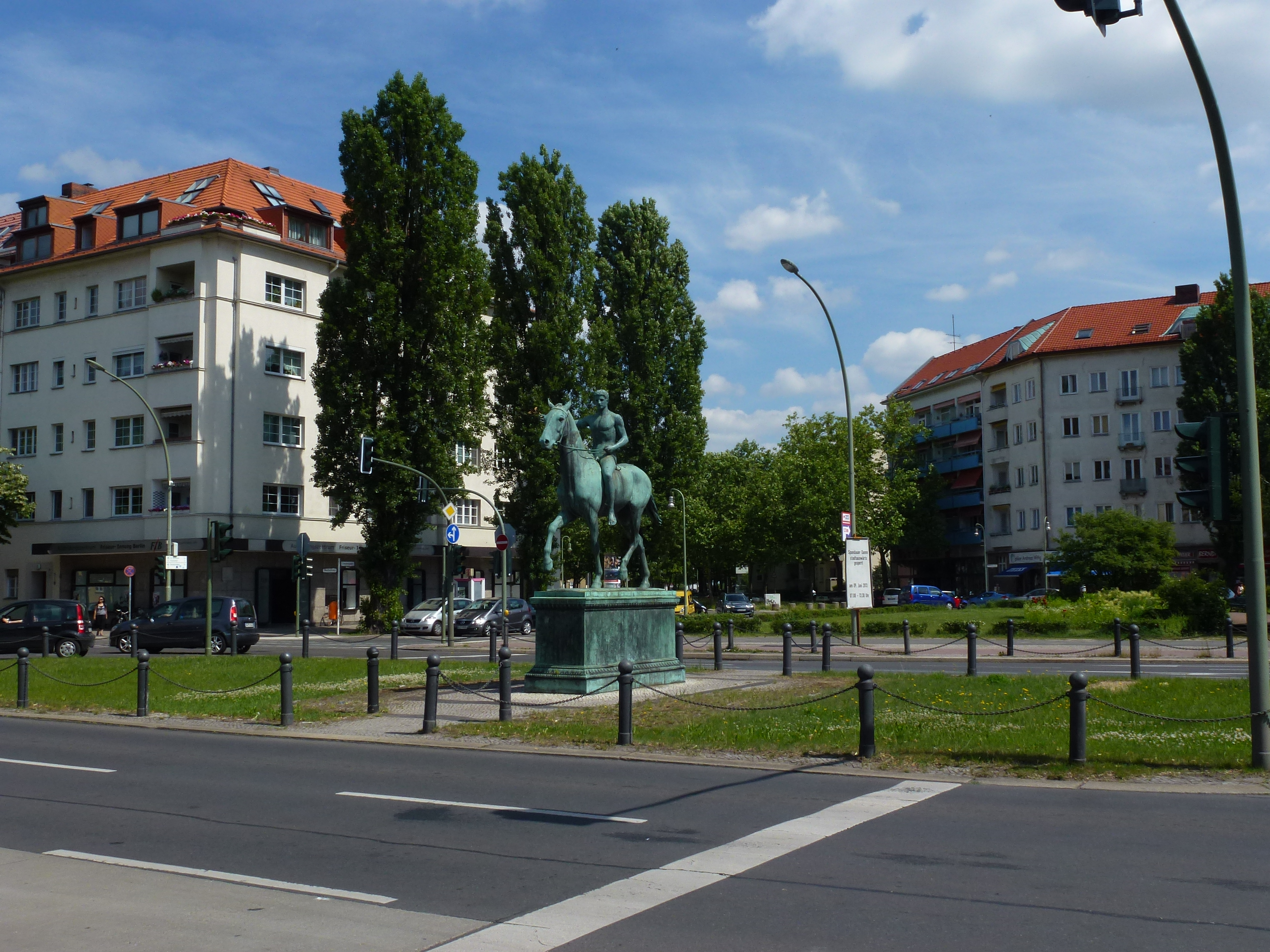
- Steubenplatz with equestrian statue by Louis Tuaillon

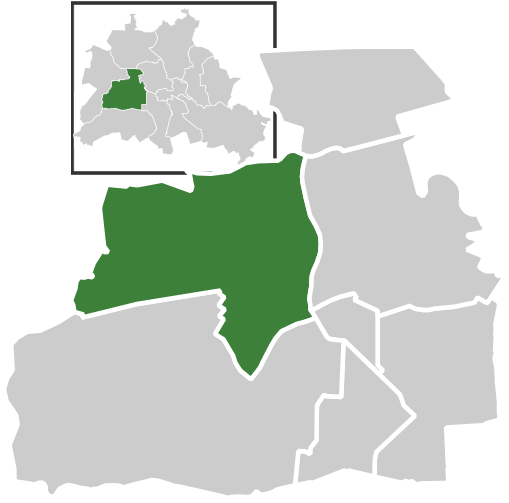
- Location of Westend in Charlottenburg-Wilmersdorf and Berlin
- Interactive map of Westend
- Location within Germany Location within Berlin
- Coordinates: 52°31′00″N 13°17′00″E
- Country: Germany
- State: Berlin
- City: Berlin
- Borough: Charlottenburg-Wilmersdorf
- Founded: 1866

Area
  - Total: 13.5 km^{2} (5.2 sq mi)
- Elevation: 52 m (171 ft)

Population (2024-12-31)
  - Total: 41,046
  - Density: 3,040/km^{2} (7,870/sq mi)
- Time zone: UTC+01:00 (CET)
  - Summer (DST): UTC+02:00 (CEST)
- Postal codes: 14050, 14052, 14053, 14055, 14057, 14059
- Vehicle registration: B

Westend (German: [ˈvɛstʔˈɛnt]) is a locality of the Berlin borough Charlottenburg-Wilmersdorf in Germany. It emerged in the course of Berlin's 2001 administrative reform on the grounds of the former Charlottenburg borough. Originally a mansion colony, it is today a quite densely settled, still affluent territory adjacent to Berlin's inner city in the east.

== Geography ==
Westend is situated west of Berlin's inner city on Spandauer Berg, the northern peak of the sandy Teltow plateau between the river valleys of Spree and Havel. It is centered on Theodor-Heuss-Platz, a large square, from where the Heerstraße arterial road, part of the Bundesstraße 2 and Bundesstraße 5 highways, runs west towards the Berlin city limits. In the west and north, Westend borders on the Berlin Spandau borough.

The locality also includes the neighbourhoods of Neu-Westend and Ruhleben, a suburban housing area of the 1920s. The site of the former Ruhleben internment camp, a World War I detention camp for civilians, today is part of the adjacent Spandau district. Furthermore, the areas of Pichelsberg, Heerstraße and Eichkamp at the northern rim of the Grunewald forest belong to Westend. It is also home of the Messe Berlin exhibition grounds (where the International Green Week and the Internationale Funkausstellung are held) and of the Olympiastadion built for the 1936 Summer Olympics.

== History ==
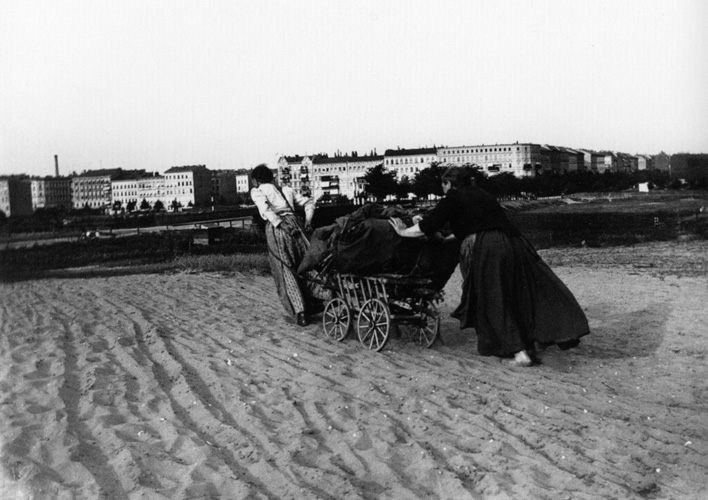
View from Spandauer Berg to Charlottenburg, photographed by Heinrich Zille about 1900

When upon the 1806 Battle of Jena–Auerstedt victorious Napoleon moved into Berlin, he had a military camp set up on Spandauer Berg, though he himself chose nearby Charlottenburg Palace for accommodation. In May 1808 General Claude Victor-Perrin, French governor of Berlin, pitched the large Camp Napoleonbourg here, however, he folded up his tents already in November and wasteland was left behind. On the road from Charlottenburg to Spandau, the Spandauer Bock brewery was established in 1840, together with a popular pub catering though of doubtful reputation.

The Villenkolonie Westend was developed from 1866 on as a residential area for the wealthy bourgeoisie of Berlin and named after the West End of London. The beginnings, overshadowed by the Austro-Prussian War, were quite modest and the first land settlement company around the Stettin merchant Johannes Quistorp and architect Martin Gropius collapsed in the Panic of 1873. Nevertheless, the development was boosted by Berlin's population pressure after the unification of Germany and similar to other mansion colonies such as Lichterfelde West or Grunewald, most of the premises were overbuilt by the end of the century.

The area was connected to the Berlin Ringbahn with the inauguration of Westend station in 1877. In 1889 a harness racing track opened, which was relocated to Ruhleben in 1908. Westend again became a garrison town, when in the 1890s the 3rd Brigade regiment No. 3 (Königin Elisabeth) barracks of the German 2nd Guards Infantry Division were erected on the eastern Spandauer Berg slope. On 8 June 1913, the Deutsches Stadion was inaugurated in the northern Grunewald forest, designated as venue of the 1916 Summer Olympics that were never held due to World War I and later rebuilt as Olympiastation.

One of the most prominent sports clubs based in Westend is the football club Hertha BSC. The club was one of the founding members of the Bundesliga in 1963 and they have played their home matches at the Olympiastadion since that year, with the exception of a period between 1986 and 1988. During the 2025–26 season, Hertha BSC recorded an average home attendance of 48,291 spectators, the second-highest in the 2. Bundesliga.

== Sights ==
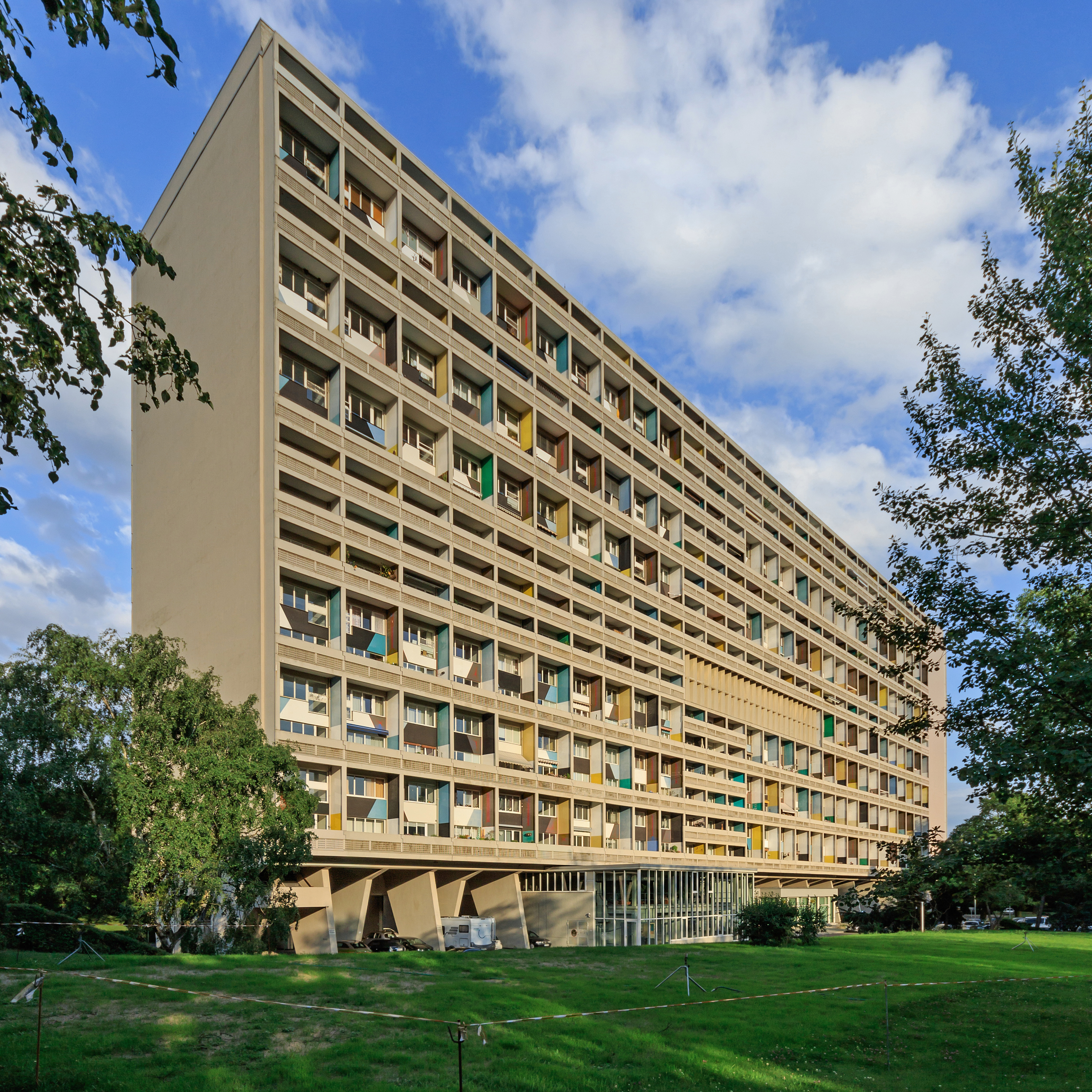
Unité d'habitation

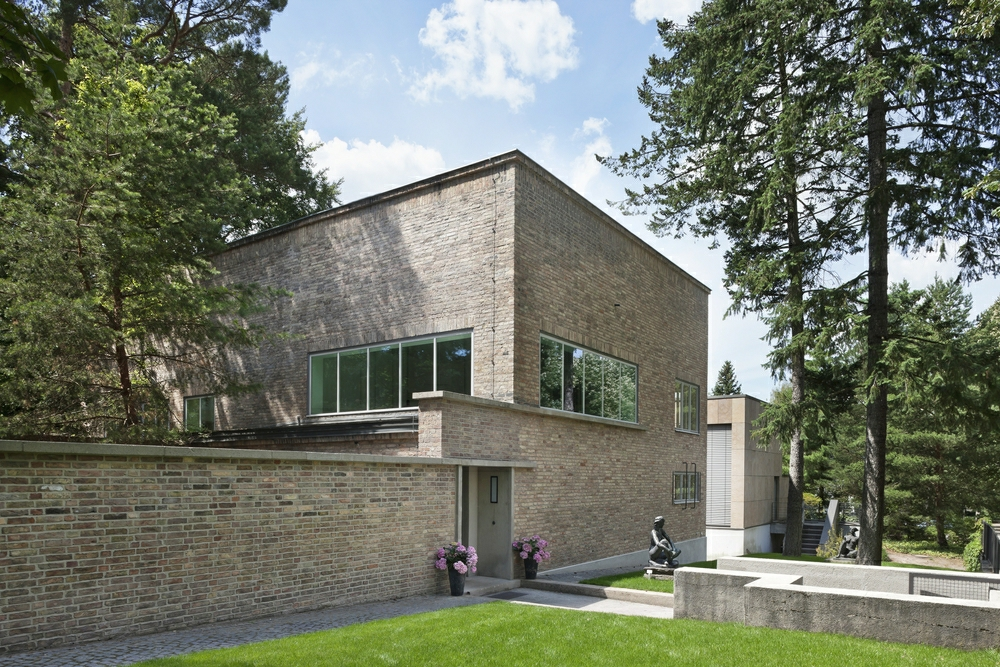
Georg Kolbe Museum

- Funkturm, erected in 1926 on the Messe Berlin grounds
- Haus des Rundfunks by Hans Poelzig, 1931, today broadcasting centre of the Rundfunk Berlin-Brandenburg (RBB)
- Deutschlandhalle arena, 1935, demolished in 2011
- Messe Berlin arena, 1936/1937
- St. George's Anglican Church, 1950
- Epiphany Church, built in 1906 according to plans designed by Jürgen Kröger
- Olympic Stadium with Bell Tower (Glockenturm) and Waldbühne amphitheatre by Werner March, 1934–36
- Unité d'Habitation with Modulor scale by Le Corbusier, part of the Interbau exhibition 1957
- Studio of sculptor Georg Kolbe, 1928/1929, today a museum
- Internationales Congress Centrum (ICC) conference centre, 1975–1979
- Mommsen Stadium, 1930, home of the Tennis Borussia Berlin football club
- Westend hospital of the German Red Cross
- Spandauer Berg water tower, 1909
- Villas along the street Am Rupenhorn by Erich Mendelsohn, 1930 and Wassili and Hans Luckhardt, 1932
- Kaiser Wilhelm Memorial Cemetery

== Demography ==
Year	Population
2007	37,718
2010	38,007
2011	38,501
2012	38,944
2013	39,636
2014	39,691
2015	40,248

Year	Population
2016	41,672
2017	41,718
2018	41,777
2019	41,882
2020	41,328
2021	40,345
2022	40,984

== Transportation ==
Westend is served by the Berlin S-Bahn Ringbahn lines S41, S42 and S46 at the stations Westend, Messe Nord/ICC and Westkreuz as well as the Westbahn lines S75 and S5 at the stations Messe Süd, Heerstraße, Olympiastadion (Süd) and Pichelsberg. The Siemensstadt-Fürstenbrunn station is abandoned since 1980.

U-Bahn connection to the inner city is provided by the U2 line with the stations Kaiserdamm, Theodor-Heuss-Platz, Neu-Westend, Olympia-Stadion (Ost) and Ruhleben.

The A100 (Berliner Stadtring) motorway marks Westend's eastern border. The federal highways Bundesstraße 2 and Bundesstraße 5 together run through the locality along the streets Kaiserdamm and Heerstraße. Near the S-Bahn station Messe Nord/ICC is Berlin's Central Bus station Zentraler Omnibusbahnhof (ZOB).

== See also ==
- St. George's Anglican Church, Berlin
- Touro College Berlin
