= Oranienburger Straße =

Street in Berlin, Germany

- Oranienburger Strasse
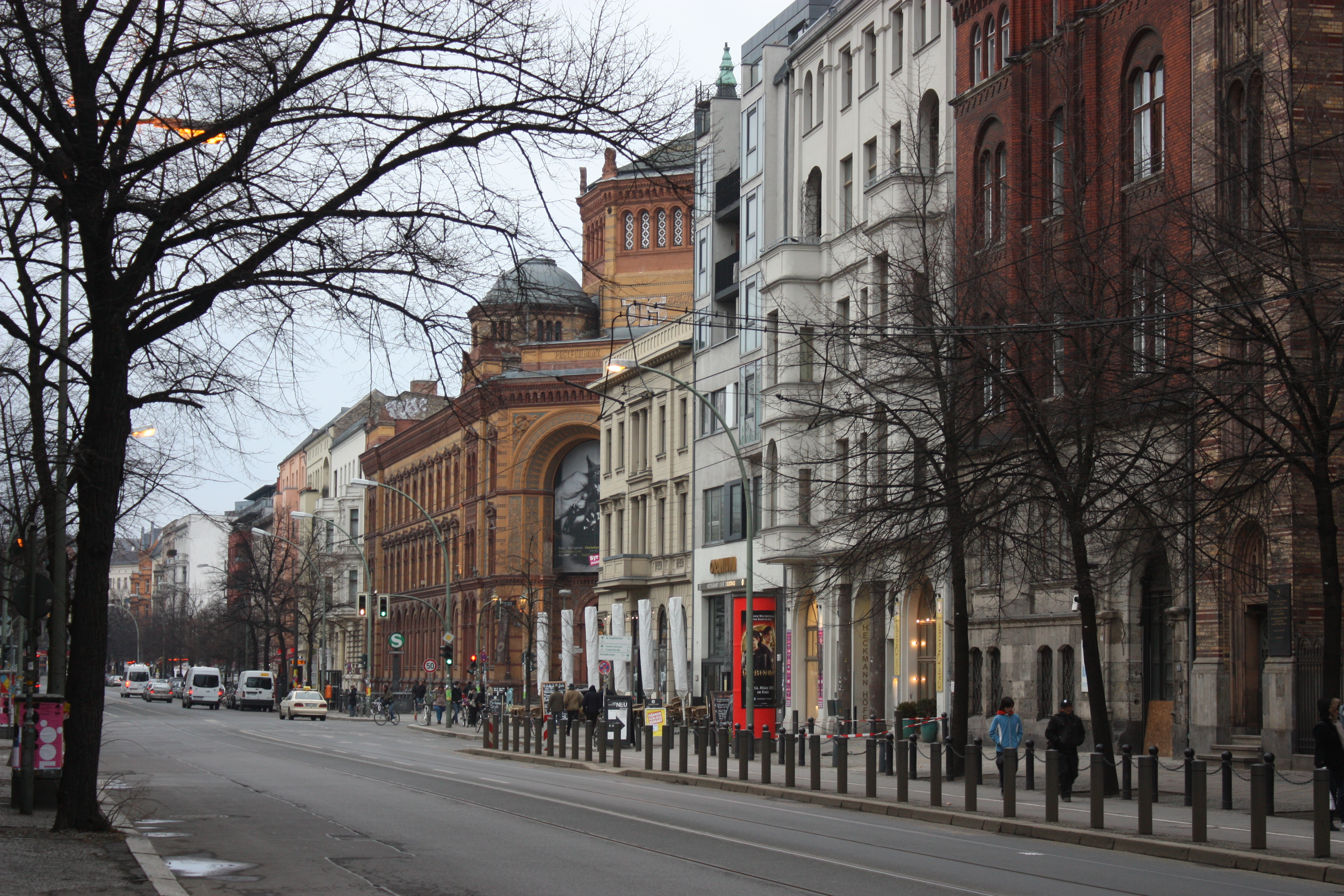
- Oranienburger Straße, central part
- Interactive map of Oranienburger Straße
- Former names: Alter Spandauer Heerweg; (13th century–1824)
- Namesake: Oranienburg
- Type: Street
- Location: Berlin, Germany
- Quarter: Mitte
- Nearest metro station: Hackescher Markt; Oranienburger Straße; Oranienburger Tor
- Coordinates: 52°31′29″N 13°23′39″E
- East end: An der Spandauer Brücke; Dircksenstraße; Rosenthaler Straße; Große Präsidentenstraße; Neue Promenade; Henriette-Herz-Platz; Hackescher Markt
- Major junctions: Große Hamburger Straße; Monbijouplatz; Krausnickstraße; Monbijoustraße; Tucholskystraße; Auguststraße; Linienstraße
- West end: Friedrichstraße

Oranienburger Straße, or Oranienburger Strasse (see ß), is a street in central Berlin. It is located in the borough of Mitte, north of the River Spree, and runs south-east from Friedrichstraße to Hackescher Markt.

The street is popular with tourists and Berliners for its nightlife with numerous restaurants and bars. Formerly a centre of Jewish life in Berlin, the street contains the restored New Synagogue. Another tourist landmark was the Kunsthaus Tacheles, an alternative art center and night club which has been the home of Fotografiska Berlin since September 2023. After it was depopulated of its people, its largely middle class Jewish population having been murdered, a then abandoned Oranienburger Straße became popular with anarchists, young artists and was also known for its street prostitution, which is legal in Germany.

There are also two lesser known streets named "Oranienburger Straße" in Berlin, in Reinickendorf and in Lichtenrade. The name is derived from the nearby town of Oranienburg.

== History ==
In the 19th and early 20th centuries this was the main Jewish area of Berlin. There are a number of memorials to the former Jewish residents of the area, including sites of former Jewish schools, orphanages, old people's homes and cemeteries. All these institutions were closed during the Nazi regime, and the great majority of the area's Jewish residents were deported to their deaths in extermination camps in occupied Poland.

== Neue Synagoge ==
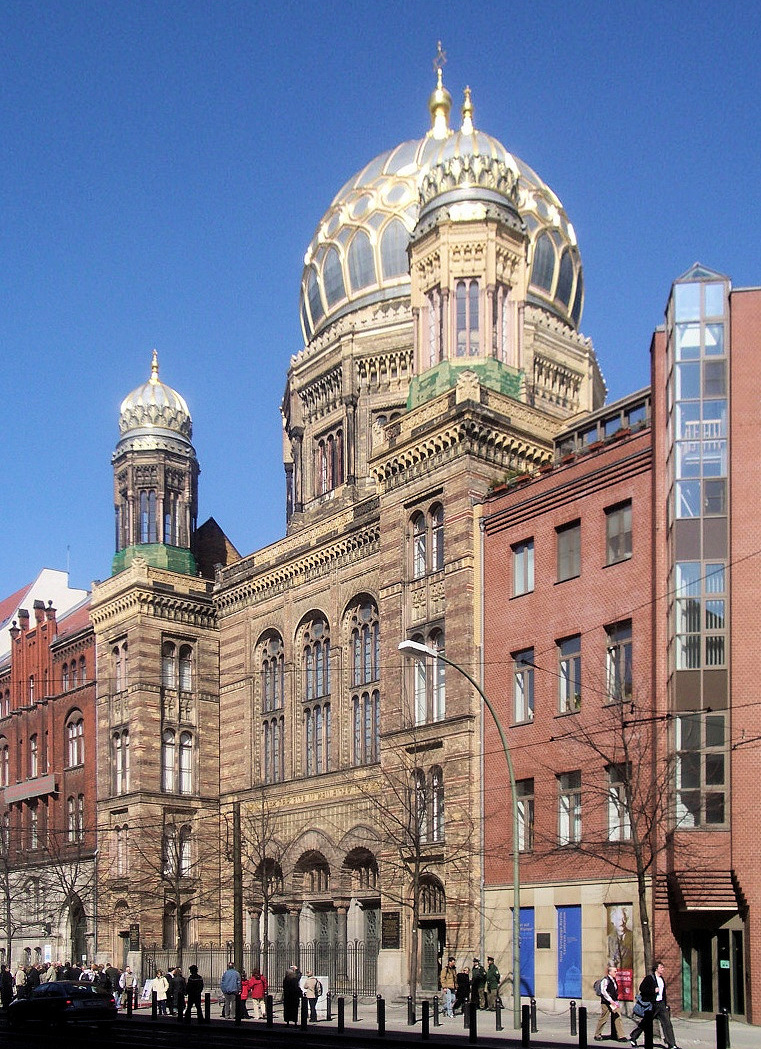
The restored New Synagogue on Oranienburger Straße

The most notable building on Oranienburger Straße is the New Synagogue (Neue Synagoge), which at the time of its opening in 1866 was the largest synagogue in Berlin. The synagogue was saved from destruction by the Nazis on Kristallnacht in 1938 by the actions of Otto Bellgardt, a local police officer, later covered up by his superior Wilhelm Krützfeld. It was largely destroyed by Allied bombing in 1943, and most of the ruins were demolished in 1958 by the German Democratic Republic authorities. The restored front section of the synagogue was reopened in 1995 as a Jewish community centre also housing a synagogue and a museum.

== English Church of St. George ==
The Englische Kirche zu St. Georg was erected in 1885 under the patronage of the Princess Royal Victoria, Crown Princess of Prussia and to the German Empire. There had been Anglican worship in Berlin since at least 1830, and from 1855 the Anglican congregation used a gatehouse of Monbijou Palace as the English Chapel. This chapel grew soon too small for the services of the congregation, regularly attended by Crown Princess Victoria. In 1883 Crown Prince Frederick William and Victoria thus conveyanced a site of the park of Monbijou Palace close to Monbijoustraße and the Domkandidatenstift. Julius Carl Raschdorff, the architect of Berlin's later built Supreme Parish and Collegiate Church, was commissioned to develop the plans for a church in close collaboration with Crown Princess Victoria, and he was sent out for a study tour to England.

The cornerstone was laid on 24 May 1884, Queen Victoria's birthday. The construction was financed through donations to the crown principal couple on the occasion of their silver wedding, also allowing for the payment of a minister. The church was built from Silesian granite and glacial erratics, covered with a patterned slate roof cladding. British relatives of the princess donated the stained-glass windows. The church, seating 300 church-goers, was inaugurated on 19 November 1885, Princess Victoria's birthday. The Kings of Prussia, simultaneously German Emperors, held the patronage over the church. On their visits to Berlin Queen Victoria and King George V visited the church in 1888 and 1913, respectively. During World War I it was the only Anglican Church in Germany allowed to remain open, because William II was then its patron.

After the war the congregation could develop again and ministered – among others – a large British-born artisan population as well as American, German, Indian, Chinese, Finnish and Russian Christians. In 1921 Charles Andrew Schönberger came to Germany and opened a branch of the Anglican Hebrew Christian Testimony to Israel in Berlin, right opposite to St. George's on Oranienburger Straße 20/21. They won a number of proselytes among the Jews of Berlin for the Anglican congregation. When the Nazi persecution of Jews and Jewish-born Christians, likewise discriminated (see The forsaken children of the Church – Protestants of Jewish descent), turned the more and more unbearable, the Hebrew Christian Testimony to Israel relinquished its premises on Oranienburger Straße 20/21 to Heinrich Grüber's help organisation, the Bureau Grüber (German: Büro Grüber), on 7 December 1938. The Bureau Grüber cooperated in its efforts with Bishop George Bell, who had gained his sister-in-law Laura Livingstone to run the Berlin office of the International Church Relief Commission for German Refugees. A plaque at the new building on Oranienburger Straße 20/21 commemorates these joint Anglican and Confessing Church efforts.

St. George's was closed at the outbreak of the Second World War, and was hit by allied bombing in 1943 and 1944. The ruin of the church, since 1945 in the Soviet Sector of Berlin, was pulled down by the German Democratic Republic (GDR) after 1949. In 1950 the congregation built the new St. George's Church in the Neu-Westend neighbourhood in the British Sector. In 1987 the original church silver, donated by Crown Princess Victoria, was discovered in a city cellar and since this time has been used in the weekly worship.

== Gespenstermauer ==
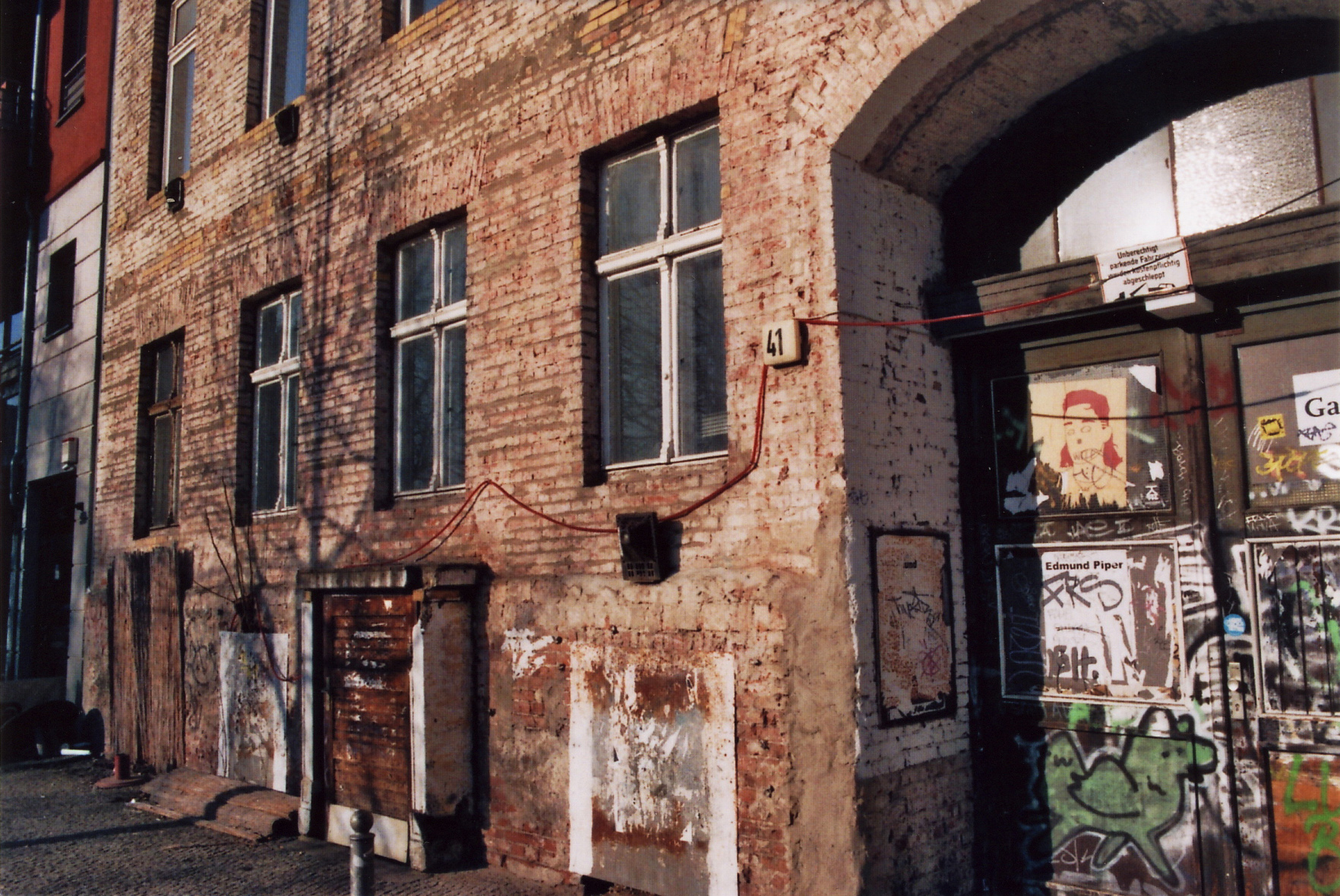
The Gespenstermauer

Oranienburger Straße is home to one of Berlin's few ghost legends: The ghost wall ('Gespenstermauer'). According to the legend, one can sometimes see the spirits of two children dash into the street and disappear near Oranienburger Straße 41 (just west of the bar 'X-terrain, and slightly East and across the street from Tacheles). The identity of the children is unknown, as is the time period in which they supposedly originate (the visions are small and vague and shadowy, apparently usually seen only quickly out of the corner of one's eye), but legend has it that the child spirits will do small favors in exchange for pennies. The procedure is to stick a penny in the crumbling mortar of the old wall near Oranienburger Straße 41 and make a wish. If the wish is modest (e.g. one that two ghost children could do), and unselfish, then it will supposedly be granted. It is unclear when the legend started, but it was known at least prior to the 1990s, among former residents of East Berlin. An inspection of the wall shows that indeed there are many pennies (and other small denomination coins) pushed into the crumbling mortar. In some versions of the story popular in GDR times, the ghost children grant wishes in return for candy.

== See also ==
- Monbijoupark
- List of restaurant districts and streets
