= Julius Carl Raschdorff =

German architect

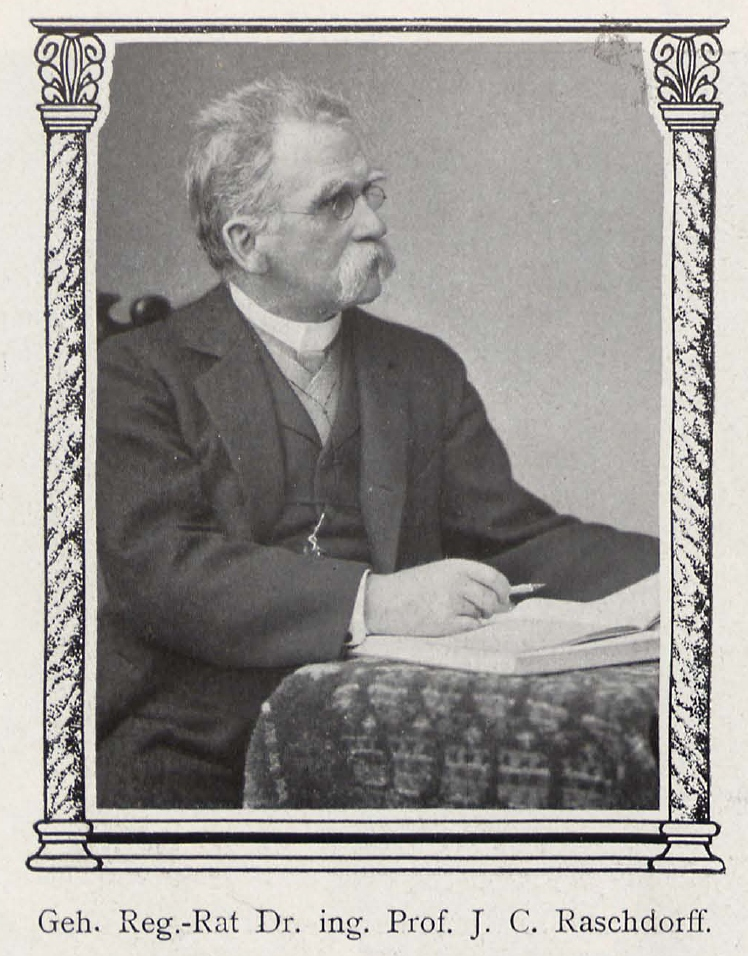
Julius Carl Raschdorff (1905)

Julius Carl Raschdorff (2 July 1823 – 13 August 1914) was a German architect and academic teacher. He is considered one of the notable architects of the second half of the 19th century in Germany and created his most important work with the Berlin Cathedral.

== Life ==
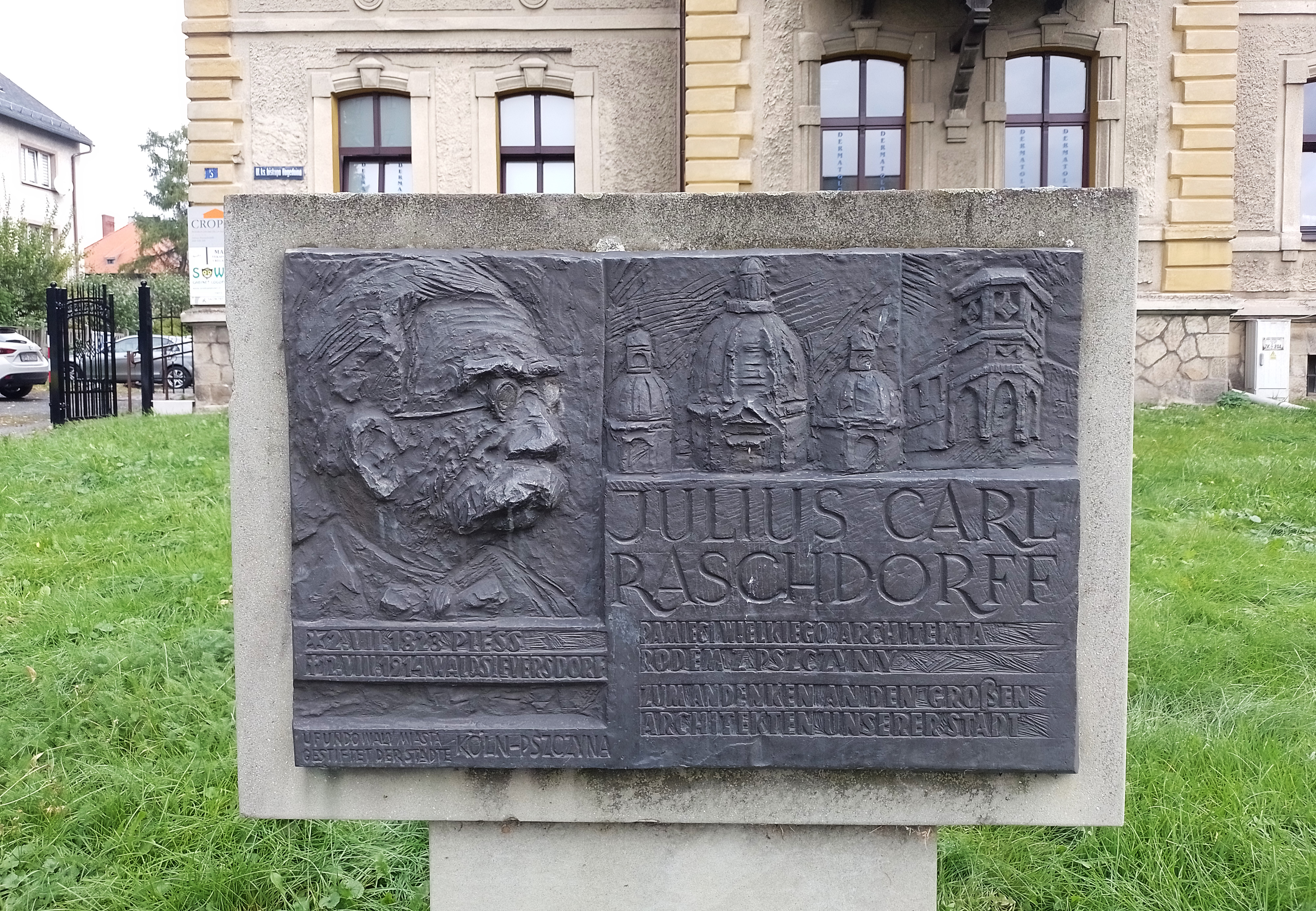
A commemorative plaque in his home town Pleß/Pszczyna

Born in Pleß, after his Abitur in 1842 in Gliwice, Raschdorff studied at the Berlin Bauakademie from 1845 to 1853. From his appointment as 2nd city architect on 1 November 1854, he worked in Cologne until 1878. There, he had a considerable influence on the Urban development in Cologne and renovated among others the Gürzenich (1854–1859) and the town hall. From 1864, he was 1st city architect, but left office in 1872 to settle as a private architect. In 1856, Raschdorff gave a lecture on new building techniques at the Paris World Exhibition. Between 1876 and 1880, the Ständehaus in Düsseldorf, which housed the Prussian Provinziallandtag and later the Landtag of North Rhine-Westphalia, was built according to his plans. Raschdorff became professor of architecture at Technische Hochschule Berlin in 1878. In 1914, he became emeritus. Raschdorff designed over 220 buildings in Germany and neighbouring countries, of which about 100 were executed in 40 different locations. A bronze portrait of Raschdorff was created by Adolf Brütt in 1895 for the Berlin Cathedral, in which Brütt was just as involved as in the Kaiser-Friedrich-Mausoleum (1888/1890) for Potsdam. In 1896, he received a large gold medal at the Große Berliner Kunstausstellung.

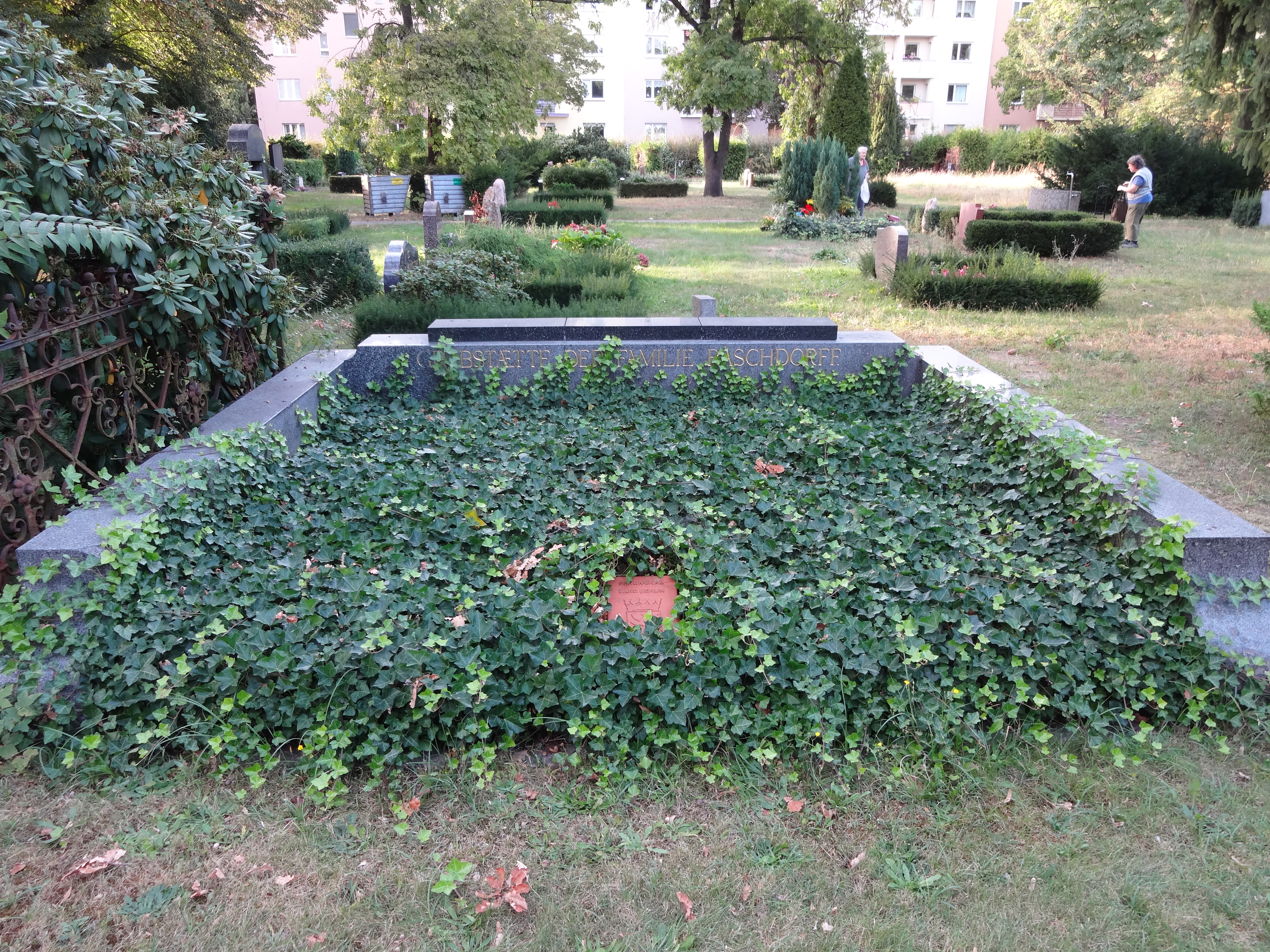
Grave site

He was laid to rest at the Dorotheenstädtischer Friedhof II in an Ehrengrab of the city of Berlin.

His son Otto also became an architect and his closest collaborator.

== Work ==
=== Buildings and designs ===
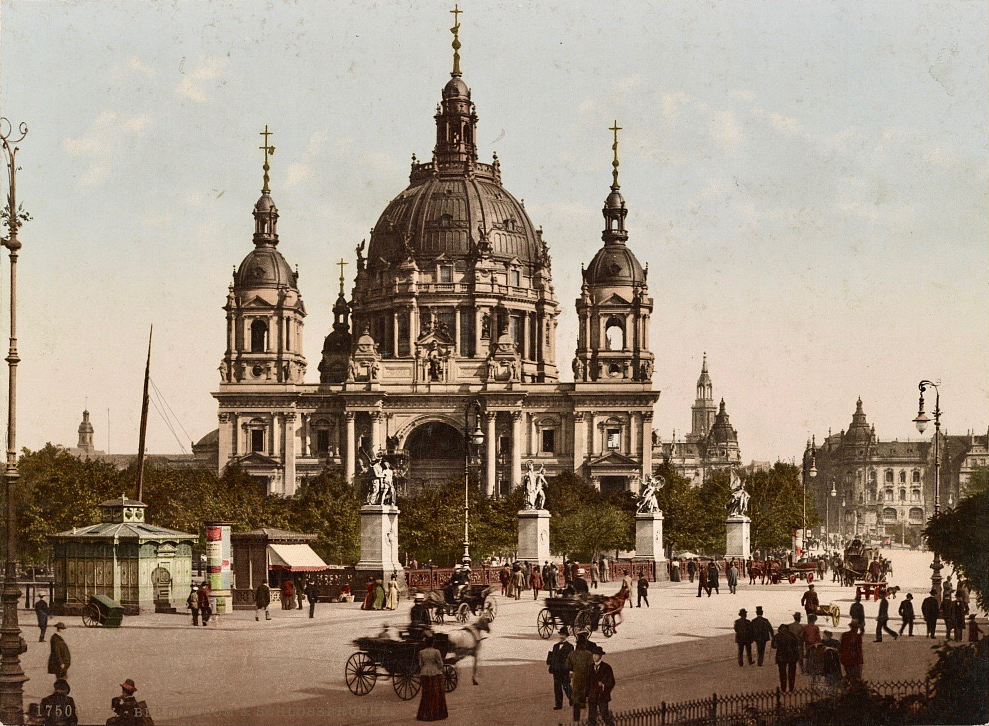
Berlin Cathedral, c. 1900

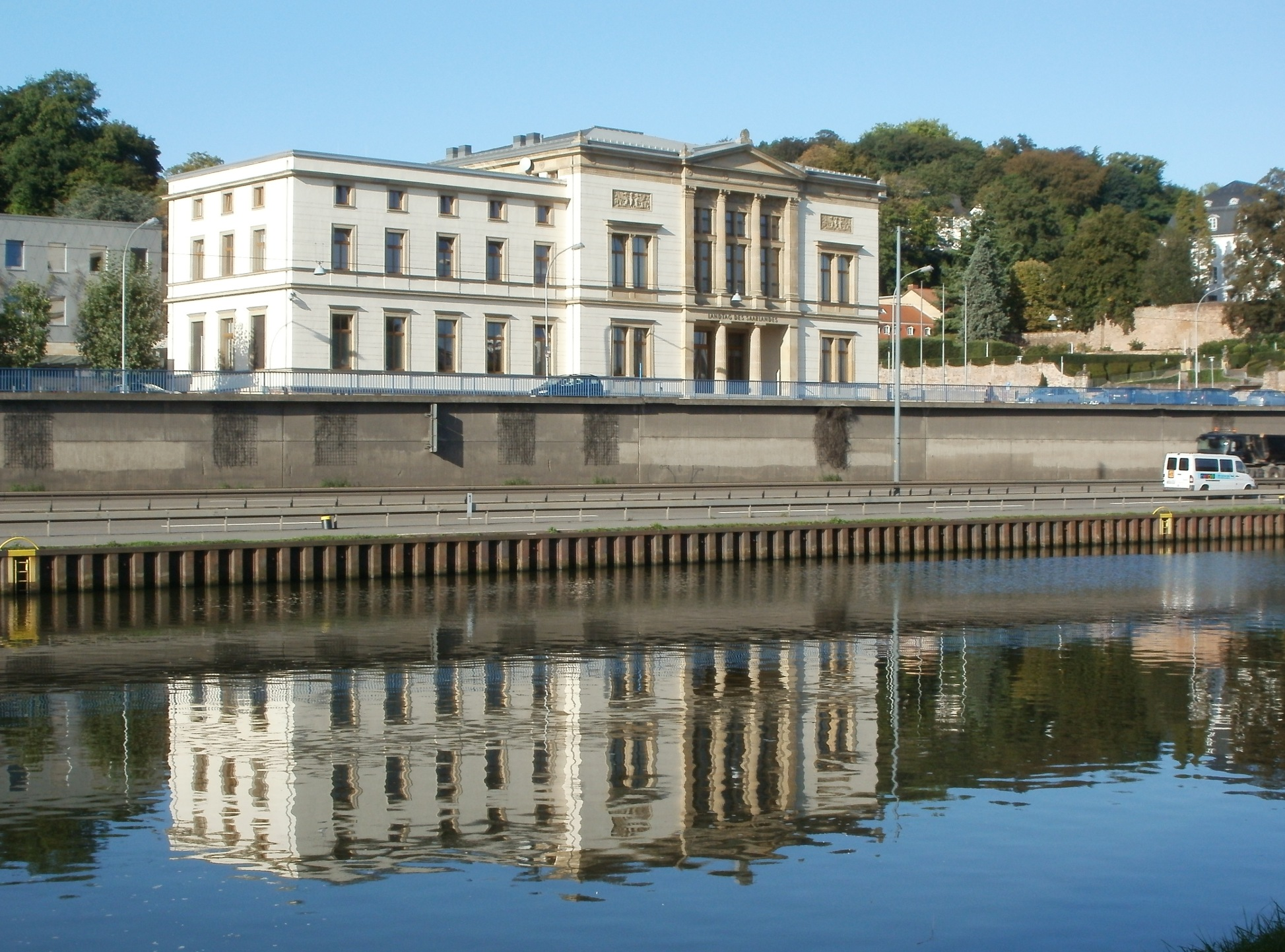
Haus der Casino-Gesellschaft in Saarbrücken (Landtag des Saarlands)

- 1858–1860: Haus Sölling in Rolandseck
- 1861: Wallraf-Richartz-Museum (together with Felten)
- 1865–1866: Haus der Casino-Gesellschaft in Saarbrücken (today Landtag of Saarland)
- 1859–1860: Apostelgymnasium in Cologne
- 1869–1872: Municipal theatre in Cologne, Glockengasse (destroyed in the Second World War)
- 1870–1872: Etzweiler manor house and estate in Elsdorf (Bergheim/Erft district) (listed, but demolished after 2006 for Hambach open-cast mine))
- 1871: Empfangsgebäude of the railway stations in Kyllburg and in Erdorf (Bitburg)
- 1871–1874: Villa for Gottfried Conze in Langenberg (Rhineland), Hauptstraße 103
- 1872–1873: Villa for Emil vom Rath in Mehlem (1955 demolished)
- 1872–1875: Deaconess House "Sarepta" in Bethel (Bielefeld)
- 1876–1880: Estates House in Düsseldorf
- 1877: New Protestant Church in Langenberg (Rheinland), Donnerstraße 15 (today "Event-Kirche")
- 1877: Rectory in Langenberg (Rheinland), Wiemerstraße 12
- 1877–1878: Villa for Hermann Colsman in Langenberg (Rheinland), Wiemerstraße 8
- 1877: Villa Petershall for the textile manufacturer David Peters in Velbert
- 1878–1880: Post Office building (Post Office, Telegraph Office and Oberpostdirektion Münster), Domplatz 6/7
- 1878: Amtsgericht in Langenberg (Rheinland), Hauptstraße 122
- 1878: Design of a villa for Andreas Colsman in Langenberg (Rhineland) (The execution took place in 1884 in a modified form according to plans by Hermann Otto Pflaume.)
- 1878–1884: Neubau der Technischen Hochschule in (Berlin-)Charlottenburg (together with Richard Lucae and Friedrich Hitzig)
- 1879: Tower of the German Church, Stockholm
- 1880: Staatliche Zeichenakademie Hanau
- 1884–1885: St. George's Anglican Church, Berlin in the garden of Schloss Monbijou in Berlin
- 1888–1889: Dittrich-Mausoleum in Krásná Lípa (Nordböhmen)
- 1890: Reception building of the central station in Münster (Westfalen)
- 1890: Kaiser Friedrich Mausoleum
- 1894–1905: Berlin Cathedral
- 1895–1897: Grabkapelle of the Counts Henckel von Donnersmarck at Neudeck Castle in Upper Silesia

In total, six churches, one synagogue, 17 school buildings, four university buildings, two museums, two libraries, four hospitals, one theatre, two town halls, seven railway stations, seven castles or palaces, 23 villas and ten residential and commercial buildings by Raschdorff are known to date.

=== Drafts ===
In 1884, his competition design for the Museum Island development was awarded 4th prize alongside his son Otto Raschdorff (1854–1915).

=== Publications ===
- Das Kaufhaus Gürzenich in Köln. Berlin 1863.
- Abbildungen deutscher Schmiedewerke. Berlin 1875–78 (short edition 1878).
- Entwürfe und Bauausführungen im Stil deutscher Renaissance. Berlin 1879.
- Die Hochbau-Ausfuehrungen des preußischen Staates. Toeche, Berlin 1880. (DTAW|raschdorff_hochbau_1880)
- Abbildung deutscher Schmiedewerke. Verlag von Ernst & Korn, Berlin 1882.
- Palastarchitektur von Oberitalien und Toskana. Berlin 1883–88 (2nd part: Toskana, 3rd part: Venedig; als Fortsetzung des von Robert von Reinhardt begonnenen Werks).
- Ein Entwurf Kaiser Friedrichs zum Neubau des Doms und zur Vollendung des königlichen Schlosses in Berlin. Berlin 1888.
- Baukunst der Renaissance. 4 volumes, Berlin 1880–90.
- Rheinische Holz- und Fachwerksbauten des 16. und 17. Jahrhunderts. Berlin 1895.
