= St George's Anglican Church, Bluff Point =

Church in Geraldton, Western Australia

St George's Anglican Church
- St George's Anglican Church, Bluff Point
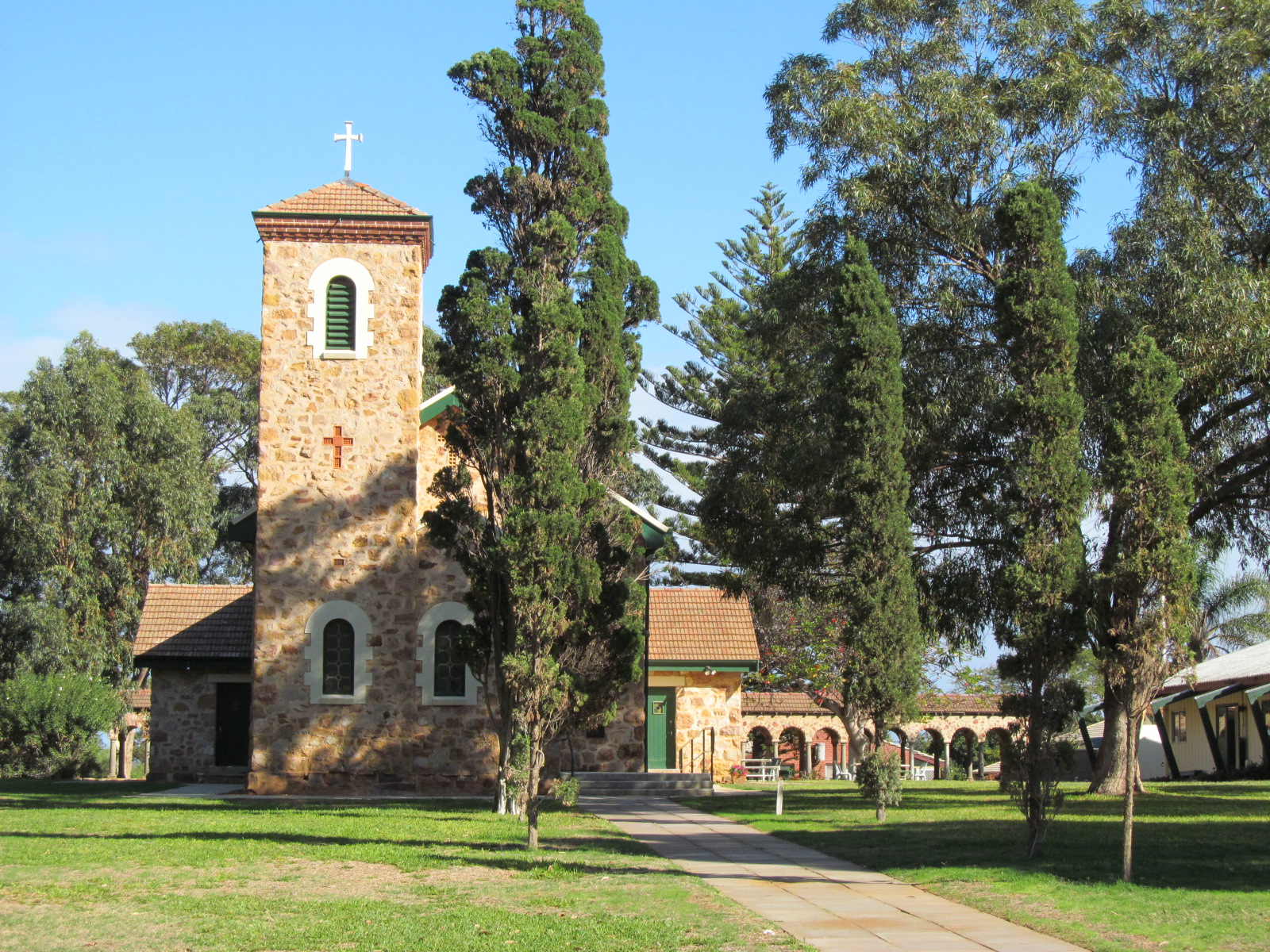
- St George's Anglican Church
- 28°44′33″S 114°37′17″E
- Location: Geraldton, Western Australia
- Address: 367 Chapman Rd, Bluff Point WA 6530
- Country: Australia
- Denomination: Anglican Church of Australia
- Churchmanship: Low church, Evangelical
- Website: Official Website

History
- Status: Church
- Founded: 1935
- Dedication: Saint George
- Consecrated: 15 Dec 1935

Architecture
- Functional status: Active
- Heritage designation: Heritage Listed
- Designated: 15 Dec 2015
- Architects: Herbert Eales; Forbes & Fitzharding (Colonnade, Lych Gate, Parish Hall)
- Architectural type: Parish church
- Style: Inter-War Romanesque
- Completed: Church - 1935; Colonnade - 1950; Lych Gate - 1957; Parish Hall - 1960

Administration
- Province: Western Australia
- Diocese: North West Australia
- Parish: Bluff Point

Clergy
- Rector: Archdeacon Paul Spackman

Western Australia Heritage Register
- Official name: St Georges Anglican Church
- Type: Heritage Listed Place
- Designated: 15 December 2015
- Reference no.: 01075

St George's Anglican Church is a heritage-listed Anglican church located in Geraldton, Western Australia. Constructed in 1935, the church is in active use and is part of the Anglican Diocese of North West Australia.

== Description ==
=== History ===
By the 1930s, the continued development and increasing population of Geraldton prompted the North West diocese to consider the creation of a second parish and church in Geraldton. But it was not until the arrival of Miss Cicely Biddle in 1933 from Brede, Sussex, that those plans were put in motion.

The location chosen was Bluff Point, Geraldton's first suburb. Miss Biddle, the Diocesan Messenger and Parish Evangelist (licensed by Bishop Frewer), is credited as the main person responsible for raising the required funds. Her efforts included raising £500 in donations from supporters in England. In total, over £1200 would be raised from England. Other fund raising activities included a fete held to commemorate the Silver Jubilee of King George V.

Ealse, Cohen and Bennett of Perth were brought on as architects, and tenders for the construction of the church were submitted by 28th March, 1935. The build was finalised by the end of the year, with the church consecrated by Bishop Frewer on December 15, 1935. The first Rector was Reverend K.B. Halley. Total cost of the build was £2300.

=== Features ===
St George's Anglican Church is styled after a traditional English church, possibly reflecting the architectural influence of Father John Hawes. Its layout includes a cruciform design, with vestry and sacristy forming the transepts, with an apse.

The church, built from local stone sourced from Narra Tarra in the Chapman Valley, features rendered surrounds, semi-circular arched windows, and detailed quoining and parapets. Similar to St John the Baptist Anglican Church in Dongara, the church is another rare example of the sanctuary being located to the west of the nave, rather than the traditional eastern placement.

A notable architectural element is the three-storey bell tower, which rises above the stone gable end of the nave and combines with an enclosed entry porch. The bell in the tower, made by Mears and Stainbank in England and installed in 1938, weighs over six hundredweight.

The church’s altar serves as a memorial to Rev. C.C. Frewer of Brede, and the pulpit, installed in 1947, commemorates those who died in World War II.

A historical artifact from Brede, England—a piece of stone from its 1000-year-old St George Church—was incorporated into the church’s porch wall in 1961.

== Additions ==
In 1950, a stone colonnade and sundial designed by Forbes and Fitzhardinge was erected to the west, behind the church. The colonnade was constructed in memory of Elizabeth Estwick, while the sundial serves as a memorial to an alter boy.

The church’s eastern approach features a small lychgate, constructed in 1957 from a darker, redder stone and adorned with a wrought iron gate depicting St George and the dragon. It commemorates Elizabeth Howes.

The adjacent Parish Hall was opened on December 4, 1960. It has undergone significant renovations in the 2020s.

== Current use ==
The church is in active use, and conducts three services on a Sunday (7:30am, 9:30am, 6:00pm). However, the 9:30am congregation has grown so large that they typically conduct services in the parish hall, while the 7:30am congregation meets in the church.

== Gallery ==
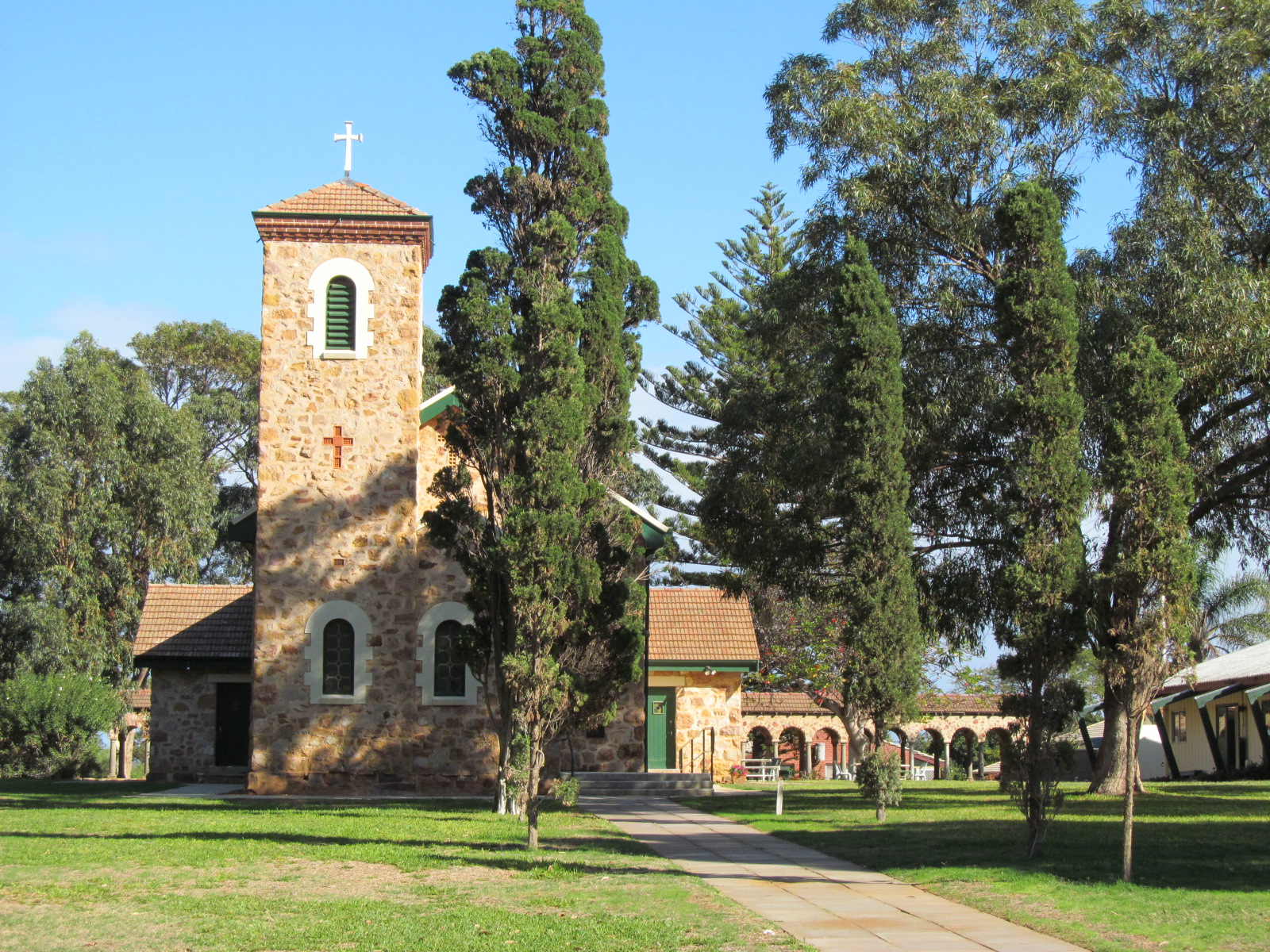
Bell tower, colonnade, and grounds.

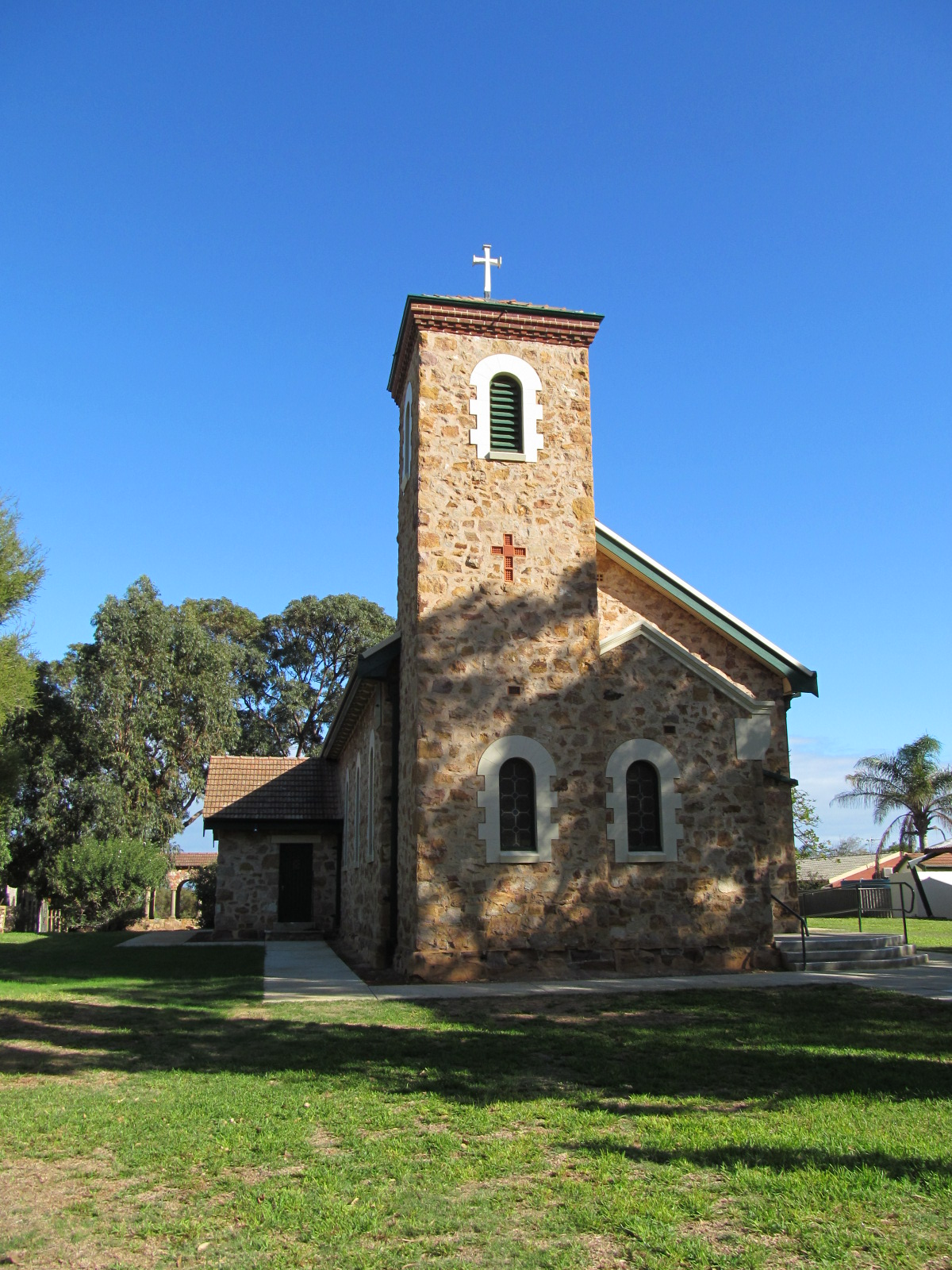
East to west view showing bell tower.

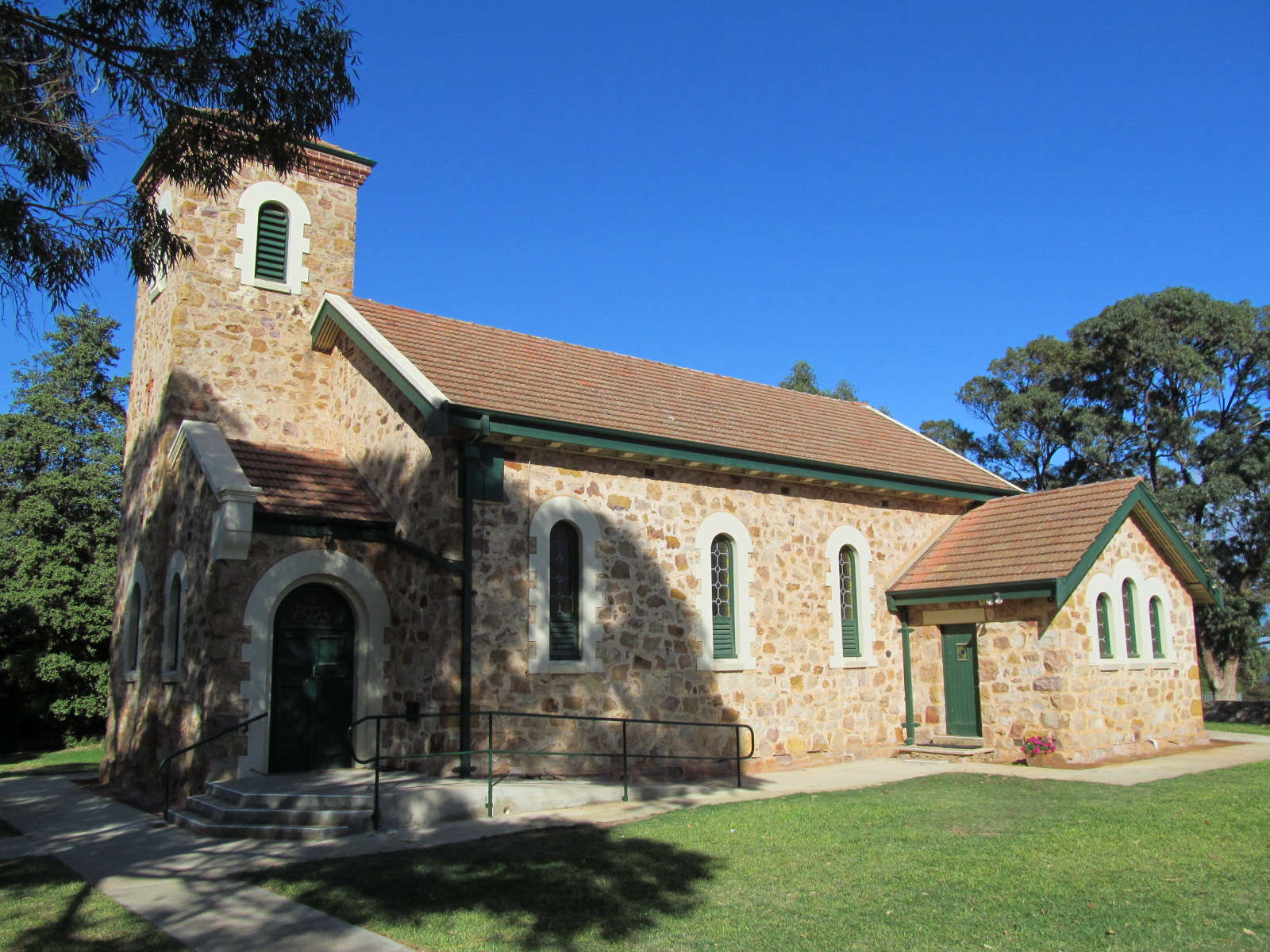
Side profile showing main entrance.

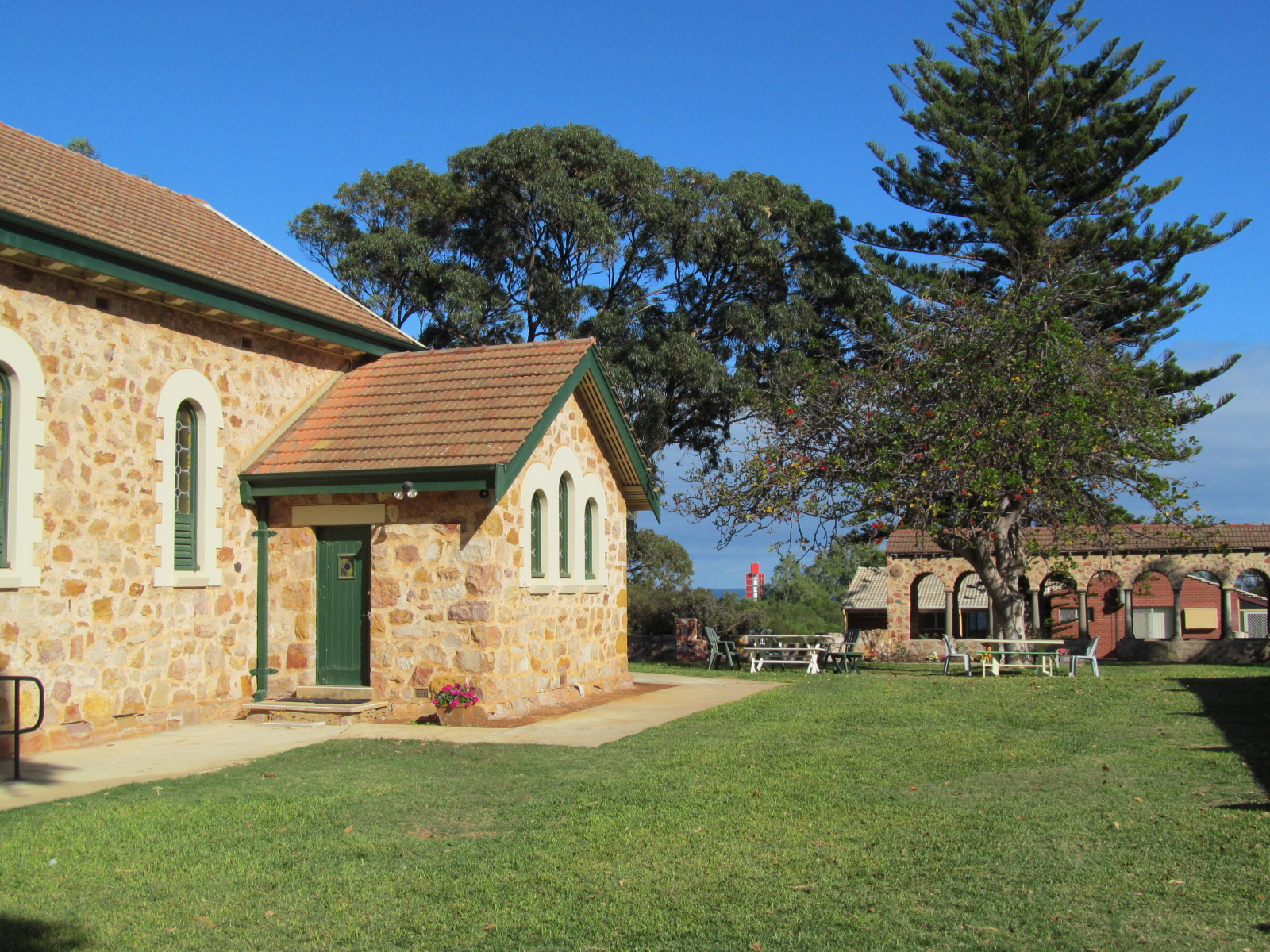
Colonnades in background.

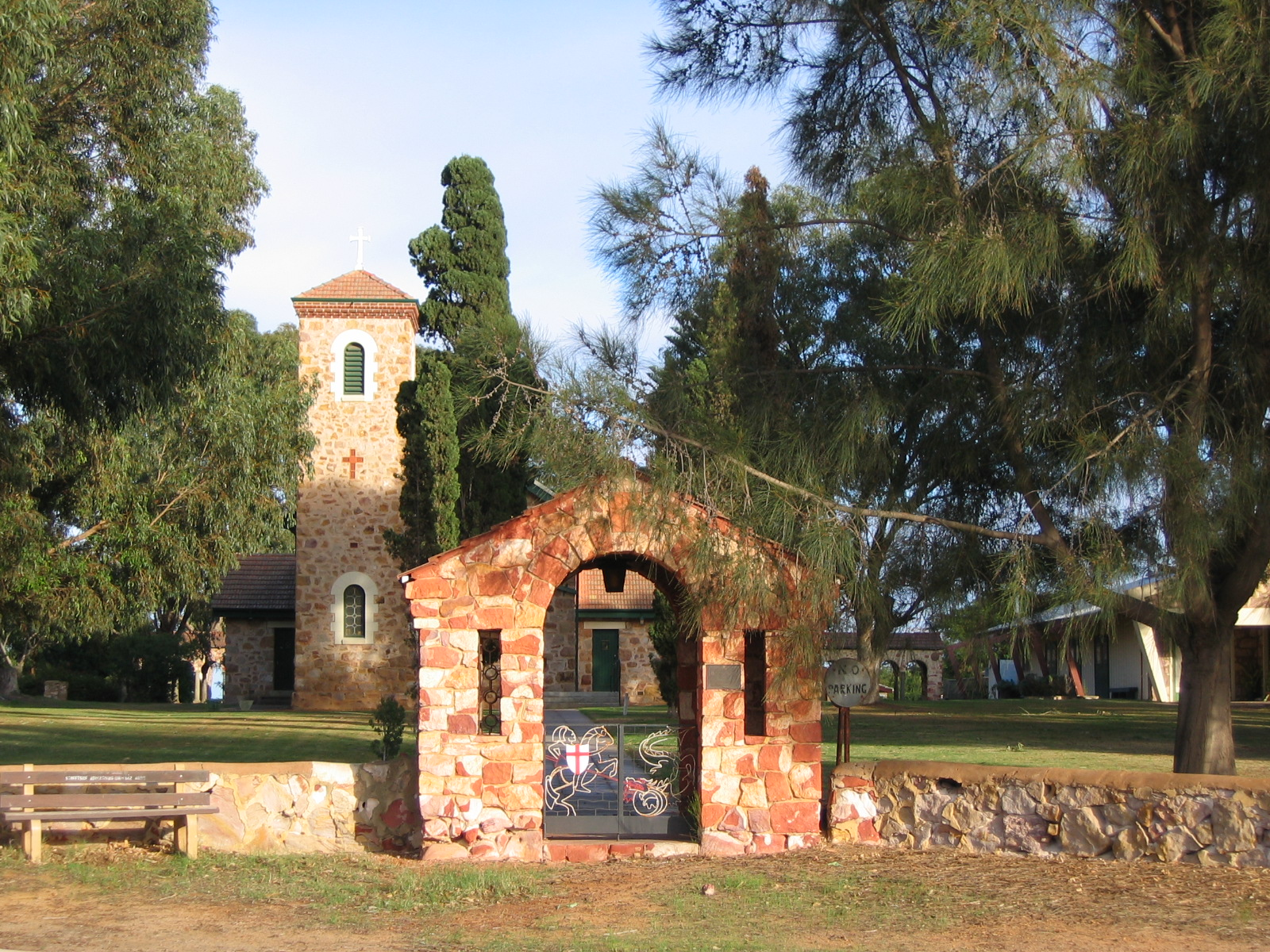
Lychgate and boundary walls.

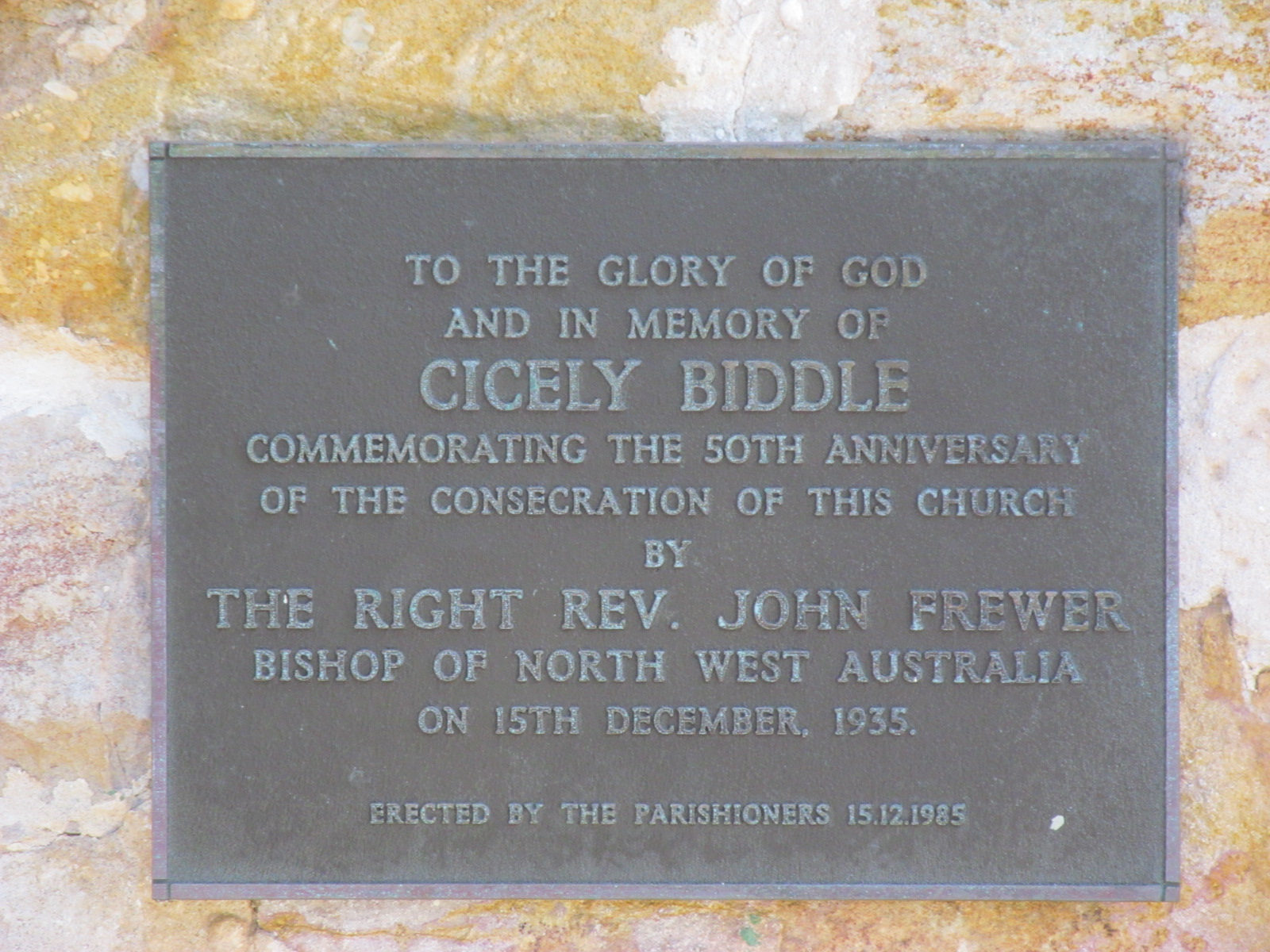
Commemoration plaque.

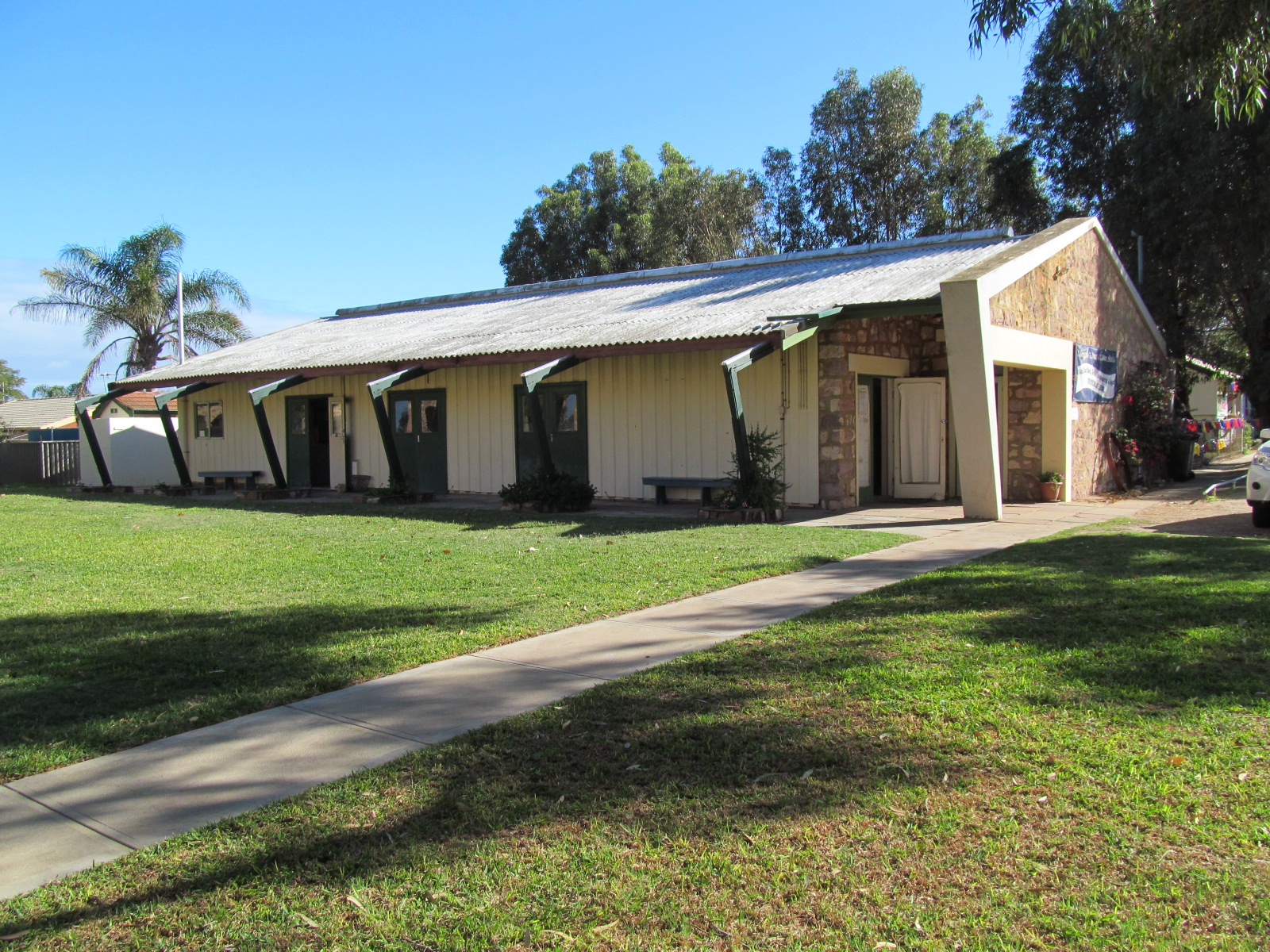
Parish hall before upgrades.

== See also ==
- Anglican Diocese of North West Australia
- List of Anglican churches in Western Australia
