= St George's Anglican Church, Queenscliff =

Anglican church in Queenscliff, Victoria, Australia

- St George the Martyr Church of England Church
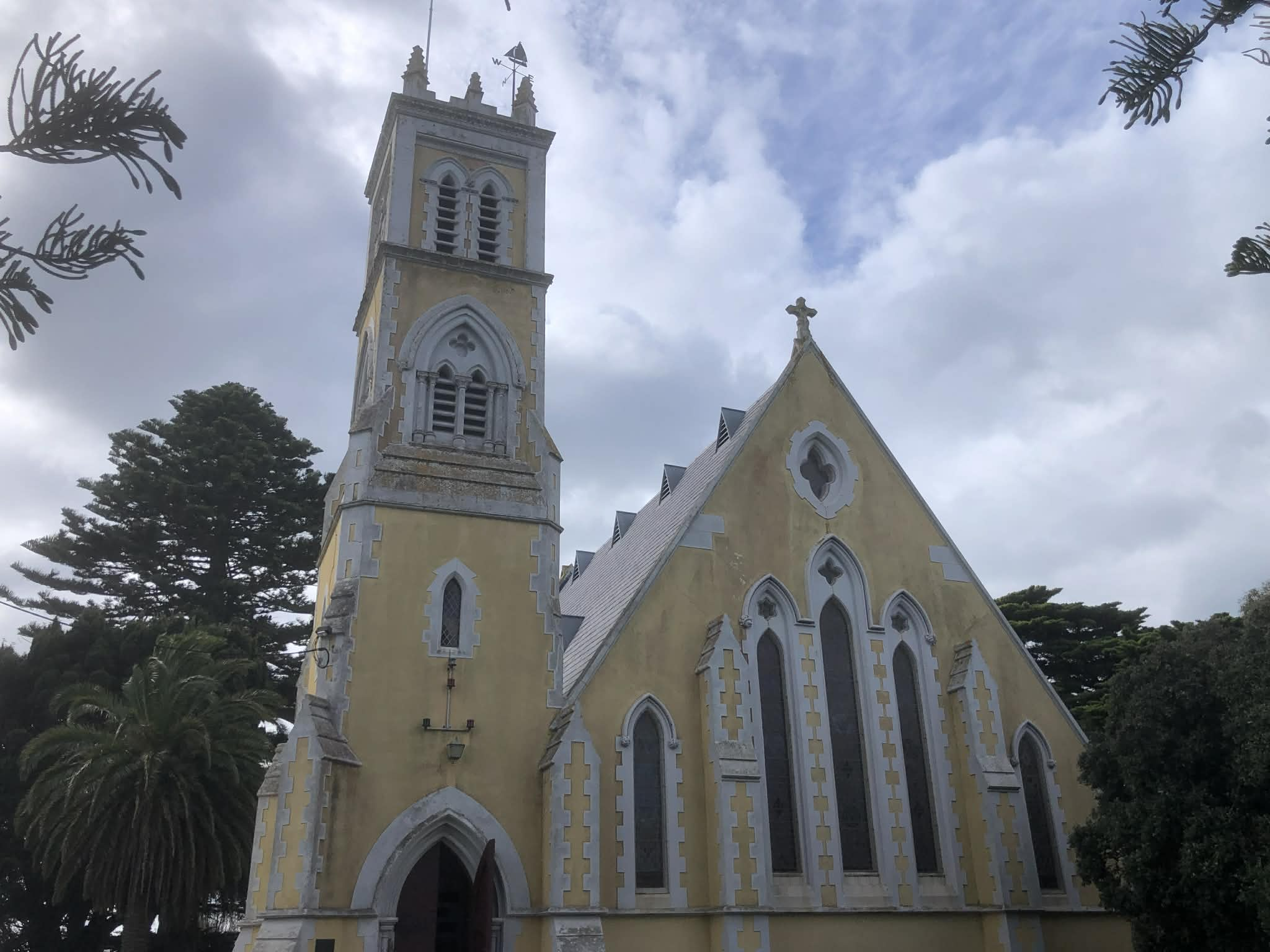
- St George's Anglican Church, Queenscliff
- St George's Anglican Church, Queenscliff
- 38°15′57″S 144°39′33″E
- Location: 16-26 Hobson Street, Queenscliff, Victoria
- Country: Australia
- Denomination: Anglican Church of Australia
- Website: www.queensclifflonsdaleanglican.org

History
- Status: Active
- Consecrated: 1868

Architecture
- Architect: Albert Purchas
- Style: Victorian Gothic
- Years built: 1863-1864
- Completed: 1864

Administration
- Province: Victoria
- Diocese: Melbourne

Clergy
- Vicar: Rev. Jo White

Victorian Heritage Register
- Official name: St George the Martyr Church
- Type: Heritage Place
- Designated: November 30, 1995
- Reference no.: H1125
- Heritage Overlay number: HO10

St George's Anglican Church (alternatively St George the Martyr Anglican Church), is a heritage-listed Anglican church located in Queenscliff, Victoria, Australia. Constructed in 1863–1864, the church has served as the principal Anglican place of worship in Queenscliff since its completion and remains an active parish church within the Anglican Diocese of Melbourne. The building is recognised for its Gothic Revival architecture, stained glass windows and notable organ.

== History ==
Anglican worship in Queenscliff in the early 1850s, shortly after the establishment of the township as a port and maritime centre at the entrance to Port Phillip Bay. Early services were conducted in a timber building erected on the present church site in 1854, which functioned as both a place of worship and a school. As Queenscliff's population expanded, the need for a larger Anglican church became evident, leading to fundraising efforts for a purpose-built structure.

The present church was designed by Albert Purchas, a prominent Melbourne architect known for his ecclesiastical work, and was constructed between 1863 and 1864 in Gothic Revival style. Built of local limestone, the church originally comprised a nave and chancel and was opened for worhsip on Sunday 7 February 1864. It was formally consecrated by Bishop Charles Perry in January 1868.

Alterations and additions were made over subsequent decades as the parish grew. A tower was added in 1878, becoming a prominent landmark within Queenscliff, while extensions to the chancel were completed in 1887.

The interior of the church contains a notable collection of stained glass windows, installed largely between the 1860s-1880s, many of which were produced by the Melbourne firm Ferguson & Urie. These windows commemorate parishioners, clergy, and local families, and depict biblical figures and Christian symbolism. Additional windows are dedicated to choir members, benefactors, and soldiers.

== Organ ==
The St George's Church houses a historic pipe organ originally built in 1871 by George Fincham, one of Victoria's leading nineteenth-century organ builders. The instrument was constructed for St Philip's Church, Collingwood, and subsequently relocated several times following church closures before being installed at its present site in 1996. The organ comprises a single manual with mechanical action, and a modest complement of stops. A comprehensive restoration was undertaken in 1999, during which the pipework, action, and casework were repaired and conserved. The organ continues to be used for liturgical services and musical performances.
