= St. George's Anglican Church (Moncton) =

Coordinates: 46°05′24″N 64°46′42″W

- Parish of Moncton
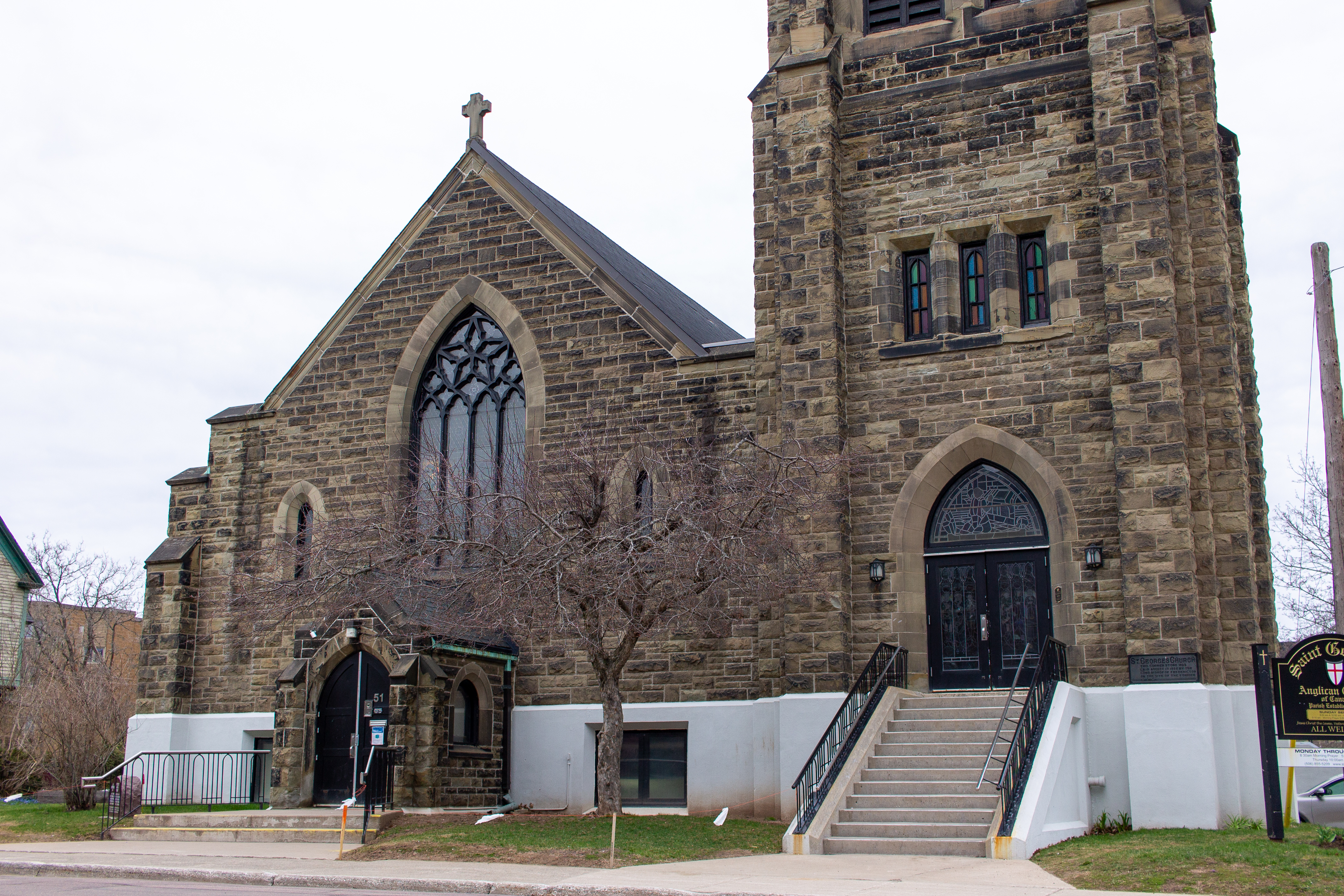
- St. George's Anglican Church
- Location: 51 Church Street; Moncton, New Brunswick; E1C 4Z3
- Country: Canada
- Denomination: Anglican
- Website: www.stgeorgesmoncton.ca

History
- Founded: 1932
- Consecrated: 1948

Architecture
- Functional status: Active
- Designated: 23 September 1996
- Architect(s): C. A. Fowler, Ambrose Wheeler
- Style: Gothic Revival
- Groundbreaking: 1932
- Completed: 1935

Administration
- Province: Canada
- Diocese: Fredericton
- Archdeaconry: Moncton

Clergy
- Rector: The Rev. Chris VanBuskirk
- Priest: The Rev. Dr. Dan Goodwin

St. George's Anglican Church is an Anglican parish church in the city of Moncton, New Brunswick, Canada.

In 1996, St. George's was designated a Heritage Property by the City of Moncton.

== History ==
The current St. George's church is the third to stand on the same property. The land which now is at the corner of Church and Queen street was donated by Judge Bliss Botsford in 1852 for the purpose of building a new Anglican church. Prior to the erection of the building, the congregation had worshiped at Moncton's Free Meeting House.

The first St. George's Church opened August 12, 1852. In 1853, the church was consecrated by Bishop John Medley on June 5. The church was destroyed by fire in 1873, and the congregation worshiped in another temporary location for two years.
