= Berlin Westkreuz station =

Railway station in Berlin, Germany

Berlin Westkreuz
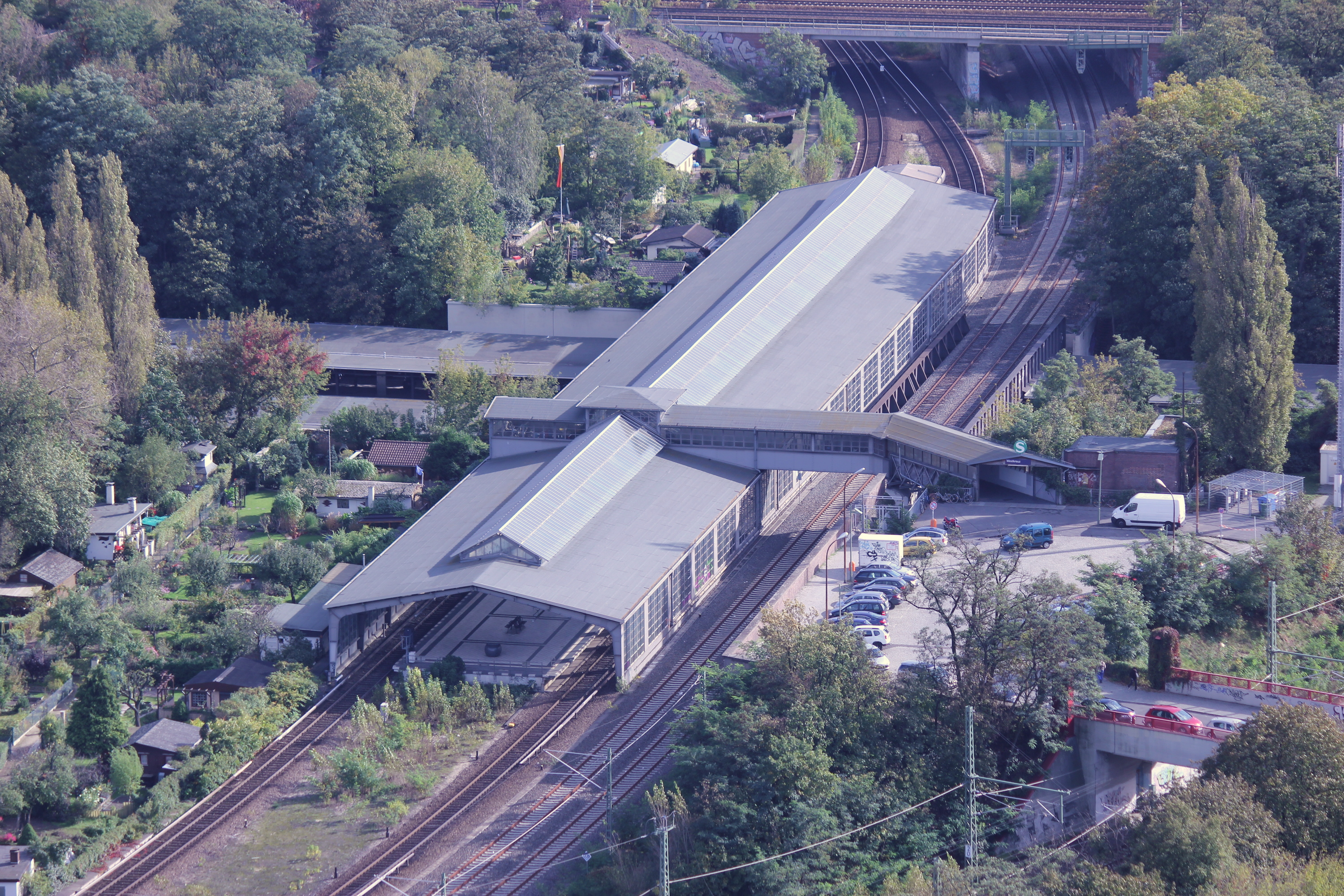
- Berlin-Westkreuz

General information
- Other names: Westkreuz
- Location: Am Messedamm/ Halenseestraße 28 14057; Charlottenburg-Wilmersdorf, Berlin, Berlin; Germany
- Coordinates: 52°30′04″N 13°17′02″E
- Owner: Deutsche Bahn
- Operator: DB InfraGO
- Lines: Stadtbahn; Ringbahn
- Platforms: 3
- Tracks: 6
- Train operators: S-Bahn Berlin

Construction
- Accessible: Yes
- Architectural style: Modernist

Other information
- Station code: 6723
- DS100 code: BWKS (Stadtbahn); BWKRR (Ringbahn)
- IBNR: 8089047
- Category: 3
- Fare zone: : Berlin A/5555
- Website: www.bahnhof.de

Services
Preceding station	Berlin S-Bahn	Following station
Messe Süd towards Spandau	S3	Charlottenburg towards Erkner
Halensee One-way operation	S41	Messe Nord/ICC Ringbahn (clockwise)
Halensee Ringbahn (counter-clockwise)	S42	Messe Nord/ICC One-way operation
Messe Nord/ICC towards Westend	S46	Halensee towards Königs Wusterhausen
Terminus	S5	Charlottenburg towards Strausberg Nord
Grunewald towards Potsdam Hbf	S7	Charlottenburg towards Ahrensfelde
Messe Süd towards Spandau	S9	Charlottenburg towards BER Airport
Location

Berlin Westkreuz (literally "Berlin West Cross") is a station in the Charlottenburg district of Berlin. It is served by the S-Bahn lines S3, S41, S42, S46, S5, S7 and S9 and so represents a major interchange point on the Berlin S-Bahn network. It lies at the opposite end of the Stadtbahn to Ostkreuz and is one of the four main stations on the Ringbahn (circle line).

S-Bahn lines run from Westkreuz station in five directions: via the Berlin–Blankenheim railway to Wannsee and Potsdam, via the Spandau Suburban Line to Olympiastadion and Spandau, via the Ringbahn to Westend or Halensee and via the Stadtbahn to the city centre.

Operationally, the station is made up of two independent operating points. The lower part is run as Berlin Westkreuz (Stadtbahn) station, abbreviated as BWKS, while the upper is run as Berlin Westkreuz (Ringbahn) station, abbreviated as BWKRR.

== Location ==
Westkreuz station is located in a sparsely populated area on the border between the districts of Charlottenburg, Halensee, Westend and Grunewald. The boundaries between the districts of Charlottenburg in the north and Halensee in the south follow the course of the platforms in the station area, so that they are completely in Charlottenburg, while the tracks to the east, west and south are in Halensee. The border with the districts of Westend in the north and Grunewald in the south is only a few metres west of the tracks, while the only access to the platforms is on the northwest side of the station from the district of Westend.

The route to the Messe Berlin (exhibition grounds) is via the streets of Am Westkreuz and Halenseestraße. Although originally intended as one of the main access stations to the exhibition grounds, they are better served by the stations of Messe Süd (formerly: Eichkamp) and Messe Nord/ICC (formerly: Witzleben) and the U-Bahn stations of Kaiserdamm and Theodor-Heuss-Platz and the buses of the Berliner Verkehrsbetriebe. Therefore, the station is mainly used for changing trains.

== History ==
Before the station was built, a pair of tracks ran west of Charlottenburg station to Berlin-Grunewald station as an extension of the Stadtbahn. Two further pairs of tracks connected the station with the northern half of the Ringbahn via Witzleben and Westend and with the southern Ringbahn via Halensee. The extended Stadtbahn and the curve to the southern Ringbahn crossed on the level in the system of tracks to the west of Charlottenburg station. The Ringbahn and suburban trains coming from the east ran to Charlottenburg via the Stadtbahn tracks. Since 1911 there was a connection for suburban traffic with the Spandau Suburban Line to Spandau via Rennbahn and Pichelsberg. This was connected to the existing pair of long-distance tracks of the Stadtbahn at Heerstraße station to minimise costs. The number of trains that could run on the Spandau Suburban Line was therefore limited by the occupancy of the long-distance tracks of the Stadtbahn. Operation of all suburban traffic to Spandau via the Berlin–Lehrte railway, which runs further north, was ruled out because the Lehrter Bahnhof had already reached the limit of its capacity.

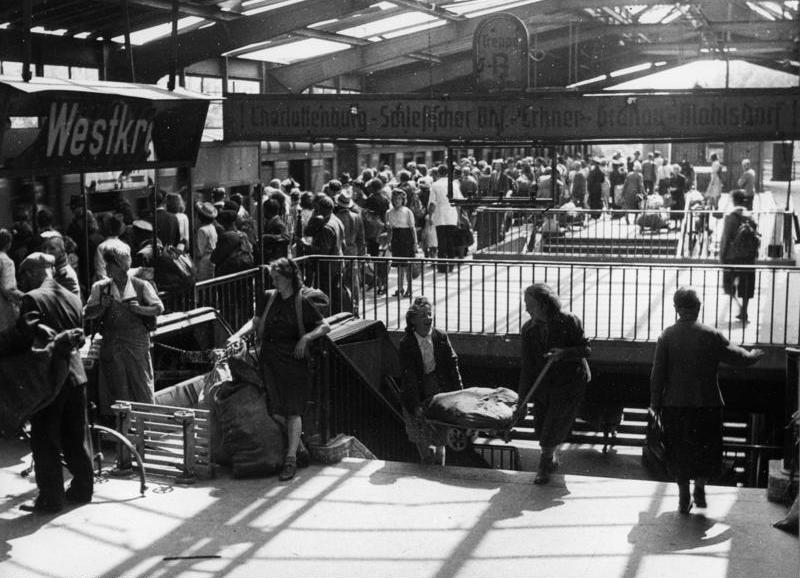
Peak hour crowd on the Ringbahn platform, 1946

As part of the main electrification of the suburban railways between 1924 and 1933, the Berlin Stadtbahn, Ringbahn and suburban line to Spandau was to have its own pair of tracks between Charlottenburg and Heerstraße. In addition, it was planned to remove the level junction between the Stadtbahn and the south ring curve and to construct a turnback east of Charlottenburg station. A station would be built to improve the interchange between the two lines at the intersection of the extended Stadtbahn and the Ringbahn. Previously passengers who arrived on trains running on the full Ringbahn had to change trains twice to reach Heerstrasse or Grunewald (in Halensee or Westend and in Charlottenburg). During the construction, the Reichsbahn had to take into account the interests of the city of Berlin, which wanted to build an exhibition grounds on an area of around 100 hectares south of Kaiserdamm. In order not to cut up the site, the Reichsbahn had to relocate the lines to Spandau on the southern edge of the site. The new pair of suburban tracks to Spandau went into operation on 23 August 1928.

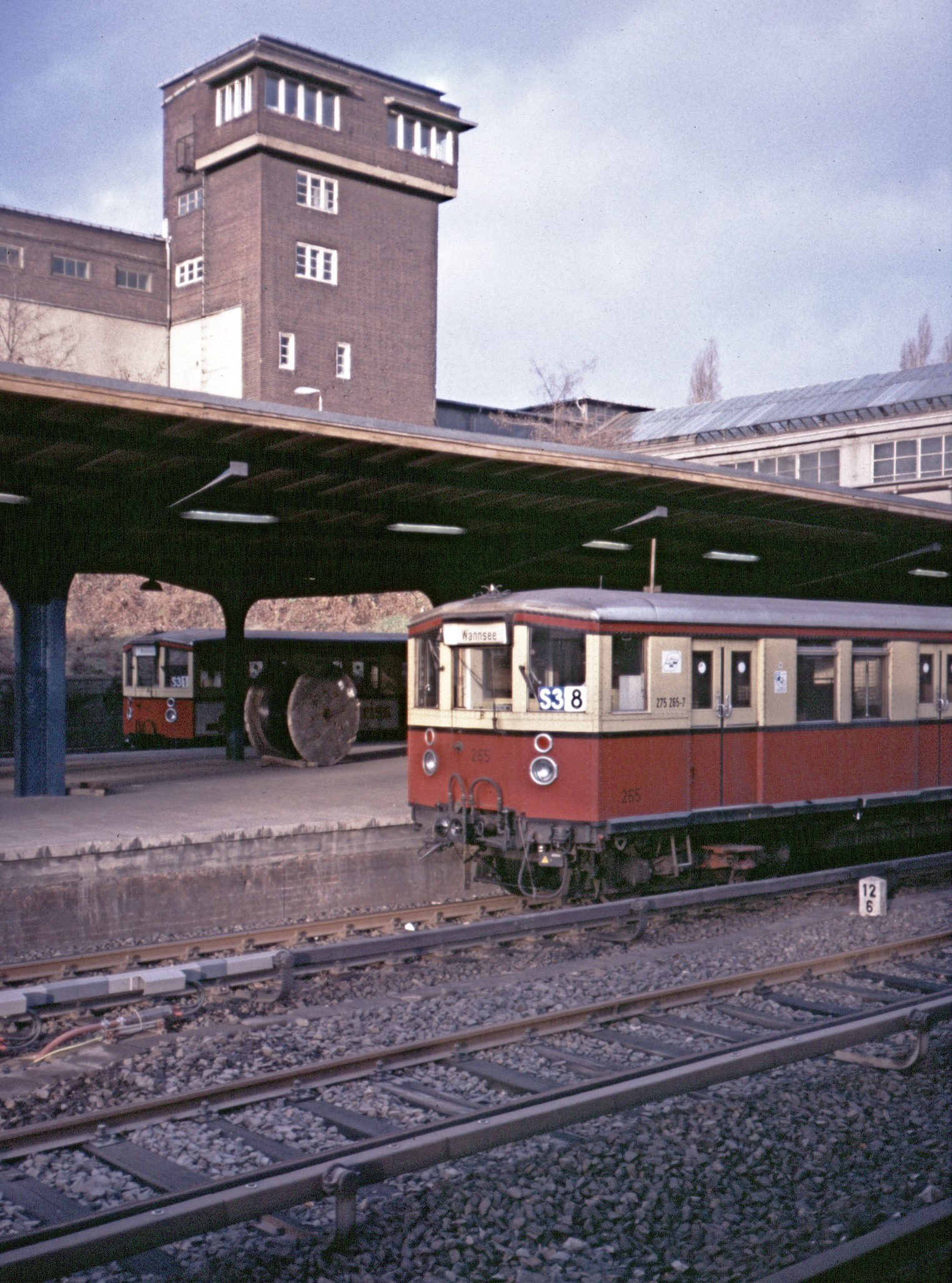
Two BVG trains on the platform for trains towards Wannsee / Spandau with the signal box behind, 1986

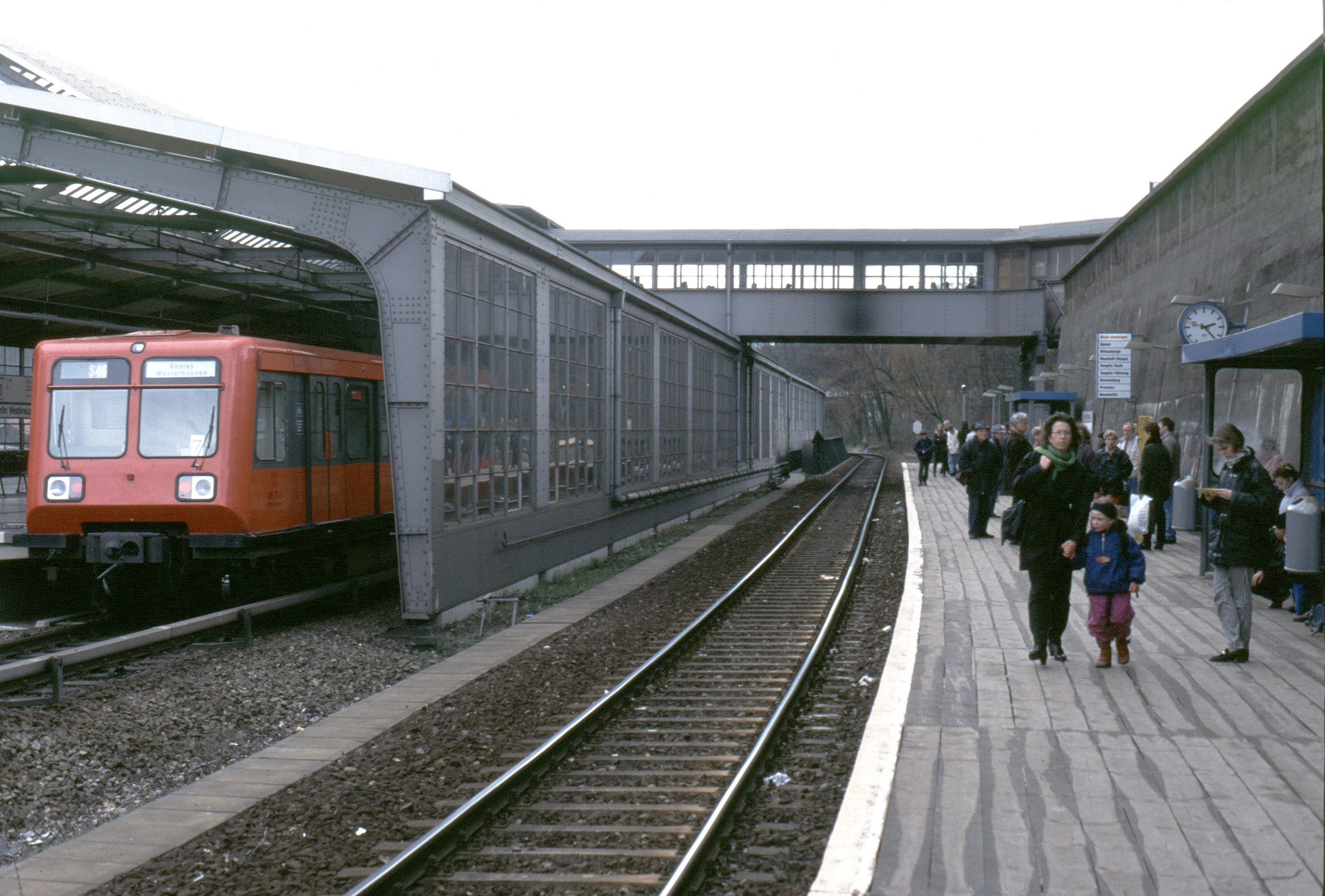
Provisional regional platform next to the Ringbahn train shed, 1997

In addition to its primary use as a transfer station between the Stadtbahn and the Ringbahn, the new station was also intended as an entrance and exit to the planned exhibition centre and was therefore given the name of Ausstellung (exhibition). For this reason, the station was given a large entrance building that was connected via a side road with Halenseestraße. Two island platforms were built for the Stadtbahn with operations in the same direction on both sided of each platform. Turnbacks were built at both ends of the platforms; the western turnback was primarily intended for trains stopping at Messe station, the eastern turnback for trains to/from Grunewald yard reversing to/from Spandau. An island platform was built on the Ringbahn at right angles to and above the two Stadtbahn platforms. The entrance and exit to the station building was made from the Ringbahn platform via a pedestrian bridge. Structural provisions were made for a second Ringbahn platform if traffic warranted. Likewise, the station building could have been extended to the west and given a separate entrance to the Stadtbahn platforms.

Ausstellung station was opened on 10 December 1928. While the Stadtbahn platforms were used by electric trains from the beginning, only steam-hauled trains ran on the Ringbahn platform until 18 April 1929. 16,000 to 20,000 passengers were expected to transfer traffic between the Stadtbahn and the Ringbahn on weekdays and around 700 trains stopped at the station every day. After a possible thinning of the traffic on the north and south ring curves, up to 50,000 passengers were expected. In addition, there were another 50,000 passengers who were expected to attend exhibitions. The name was changed to Westkreuz on 15 January 1932.

The Nazi Party plans to transform Berlin into Germania envisaged relocating long-distance traffic to the Ringbahn. Westkreuz station was to be redeveloped with a western extension that would provide a link to the Grunewald carriage sidings. Plans from 1941 included the building of two additional platforms on the S-Bahn tracks on the Stadtbahn. Five platforms would have been built to the north and four platforms to the south for long-distance traffic. Two Ringbahn platforms, one each for the S-Bahn and steam-hauled passenger trains, were to be built on the lower level. These plans were never finalised.

From the beginning there were problems with the subsoil, which consists of a sand-filled ice age meltwater channel. Settlement damage occurred during construction, including the signal box tilting. The Ringbahn train shed also sagged, with differences in settlement of up to 60 centimetres. Therefore, it had to be rebuilt over and over again. In 1968, the Reichsbahn began the largest rebuilding to date: the Ringbahn train shed was hydraulically raised, new foundations were laid, and an attempt was made to build deep foundations. This work dragged on until 1976.

The closure of the S-Bahn after the Berlin S-Bahn strike in 1980 also affected Westkreuz station. There was only minimal traffic on the Stadtbahn and no operations on the Ringbahn. Even after the BVG took over the business in 1984, nothing changed at first. It was not until 1989 that the Senate of Berlin began to rebuild the Ringbahn. It noted that there was a particularly large need to renovate Westkreuz station. In 1993, the entrance building and signal box had to be demolished; the signal box had a dangerous overhang of 30 cm. The station was equipped with escalators and lifts.

The first section of the Ringbahn was put back into operation on 17 December 1993. As a result the Westkreuz was restored as an interchange station after 13 years. Westkreuz was also the terminus of the regional railway services toward Spandau between 27 June 1994 and 31 May 1997. This required a temporary timber platform to be built on the freight tracks of the Ringbahn, which was then demolished as part of the renovation of the Ringbahn freight tracks. As part of the renovation of the Stadtbahn in Westkreuz, both the tracks and the two Stadtbahn platforms have been completely renovated since 2004. The work was completed in time for the 2006 FIFA World Cup.

The station is one of 20 so-called Stammbahnhöfen (stem stations) of the Berlin S-Bahn with local supervision of trains (ZAT-FM). At the Ringbahn platform, the train is dispatched by the driver using the driver's cab monitor. Contrary to the standard ZAT dispatching procedure, special services on the track towards Spandau are dispatched by local supervisors.

The building of an additional eastern entrance has been approved by the State of Berlin. In 2016, this was expected to be completed in 2018. It has not been built (as of November 2020).

== Structure ==
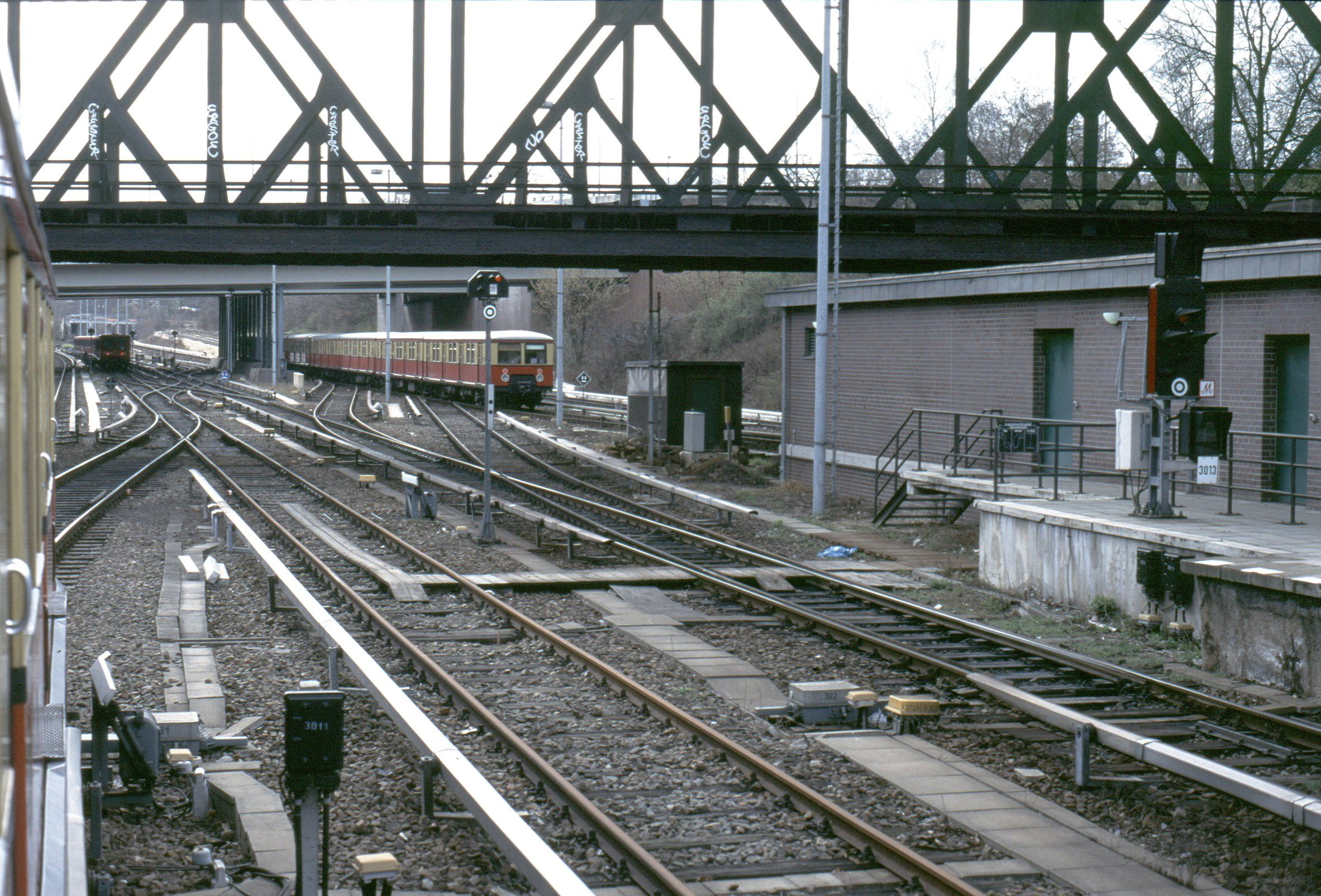
Train departing towards Wannsee and turnback tracks, 1997

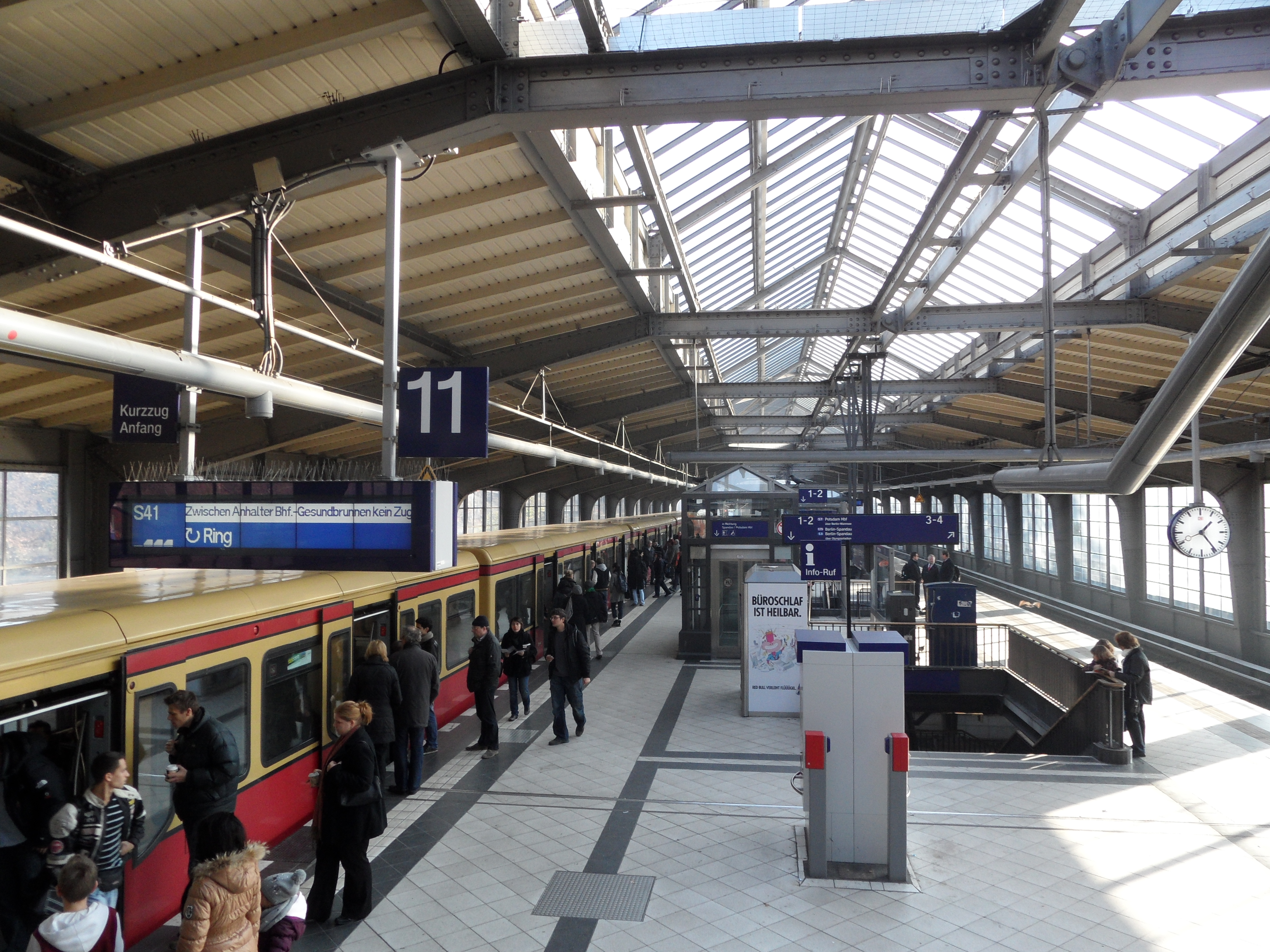
Ringbahn train shed, 2011

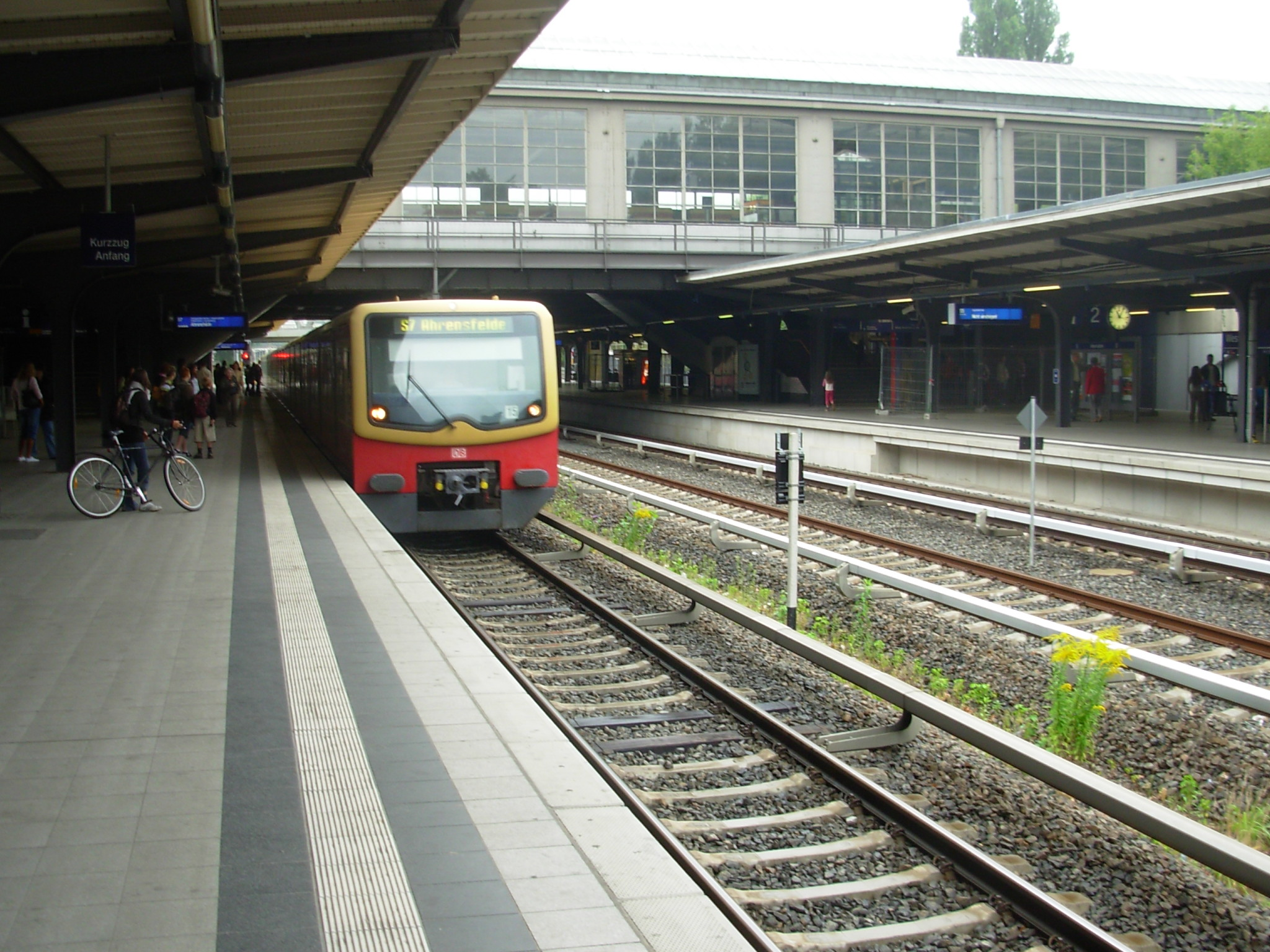
S7 train at the southern platform, 2008

The station was built to a plan of Richard Brademann. The only access to the station is via the street of Am Westkreuz. Until 1993, the entrance building was at the end of the section controlled by Electro-mechanical signalbox Wk. A pedestrian bridge spans the freight tracks of the Ringbahn and the Westend–Halensee passenger track, connecting the station building to the Ringbahn platform. Stairs connect the Ringbahn platform to the two Stadtbahn platforms.

=== Former entrance building and signal box ===
The construction of the entrance building took about a year and a half. Its large size was due to the intended function as an exhibition station. The other traffic was expected to be predominantly interchange traffic and a small amount of local traffic, according to Brademann, so the installation of a few service rooms on the platforms would have been sufficient. Brademann originally planned to locate the station building above the intersection of the Stadtbahn and Ringbahn and to have a single domed train shed over the facility. This proposal was abandoned for financial reasons.

The station building was at the southern end of the forecourt on a street now called Am Westkreuz (at Westkreuz) with the main entrance facing to the north. Another entrance was on the west side. The main entrance is symmetrical. The five entrance doors were designed in the manner of a vestibule with walls sloping backwards. Pillar-like wall frames between the individual doors divided the vestibule. In preparation for the expected exhibition traffic, the wall frames would also act as turnstiles. A canopy-like concrete slab covered the door area, above which there were rectangular areas of wall with patterned brick. A rising skylight of the ticket hall was separated by a concrete cornice from the main structure. The windows were aligned above the entrance doors. Above it was written the name BAHNHOF AUSSTELLUNG (exhibition station) or later BAHNHOF WESTKREUZ (Westkreuz station) in illuminated letters. At the southeast corner, the Wk signal box of the S&H 1912 type stood out from the rest of the building. A window front extending around three corners towards the tracks indicated its function.

In contrast, the track side of the building had a simplified facade. The wall surfaces of the nested cubic structure of the entrance building, the skylight and the signal tower were structured by flush window openings. The signal box projected from the building line of the station building. With a height of 20 metres above the tracks of the extended Stadtbahn, the building was the tallest signal box in Berlin at the time. A concrete slab that supported the control room of the signal box and two additional concrete slabs at the top of the tower formed a horizontal counterweight to the height of the structure.

The floor plan of the ticket hall also indicated its intended function as an exhibition ground station. Starting from the smaller west entrance, the ticket offices were on the right and the access to the platform was opposite the entrance. The larger north entrance would have served as an exit towards the exhibition ground, so that the streams of passengers would not have crossed. The location of this exit on the long side was justified by the layout of the forecourt, which for reasons of space could only have been laid out on the north side. In addition, a possible expansion of the entrance building had to be taken into account. If it had been implemented, this would have been extended to the west and a separate access to the Stadtbahn platforms would have been built. The walls of the ticket hall were clad with light tiles in the lower area. From there, a six metre-wide iron, wood-covered bridge walkway with glass curtain walls led to the entrance to the Ringbahn platform.

After the demolition of the entrance building and the signal box, the western corner of the building and part of the western wing of the building still exist. The tasks of the signal box after its decommissioning on 30 April 1993 and control of the WKR and WKS electronic interlockings were taken over by the signalling control centre of the Berlin S-Bahn in Halensee.

=== Tracks and platforms ===
The access from the pedestrian bridge to the Ringbahn platform is via a four metre-wide staircase. The 12.33 metre-wide and 160 metre-long Ringbahn platform is 42.08 above sea level and has a platform height of 96 centimetres. Due to its elevated location, it is equipped with a train shed for weather protection. The hall has a tapered skylight and glazed side walls. It measures 22 metres in width and 161 metres long. The Stadtbahn platforms are each 14.75 metres in width and 163 metres long, the platform height is also 96 centimeters. These platforms are located at a height of 36.08 metres above sea level. They are covered over a length of 40 metres by the iron structure of the Ringbahn train shed and the freight tracks of the Ringbahn, with canopies supported by two lines of columns over the remaining length of each platform. Additional weather protection is provided by a 6.30 metres high embankment on both sides. The stairs between the Stadtbahn and Ringbahn platforms were equipped with escalators from the start. A bypass track runs between the two Stadtbahn platforms.

There is a double-track turn-back is to the west of the Stadtbahn platforms and to the east there is a single-track turn-back for terminating services and sets running to the Hundekehle car shed. During the redevelopment of the Stadtbahn and the relocation of Berlin-Charlottenburg station, this track was temporarily adapted for passenger services. The Ringbahn station has no turn-back or points.
