= Messe Nord/ZOB station =

Railway station in Berlin, Germany

Messe Nord/ZOB
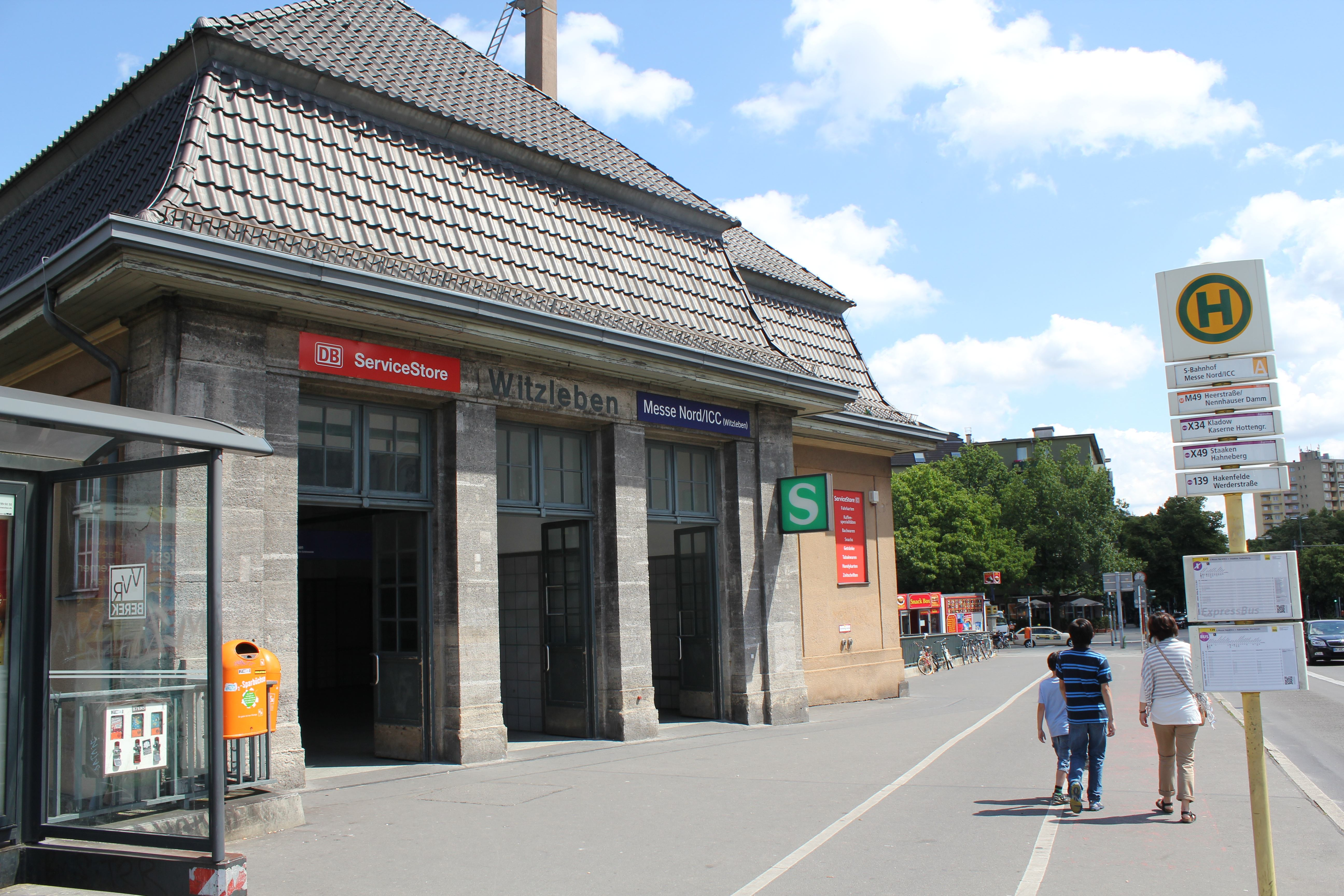
- Station building on Neue Kantstraße

General information
- Location: Charlottenburg-Wilmersdorf, Berlin, Berlin; Germany
- Coordinates: 52.5077°N 13.2835°E
- Owner: Deutsche Bahn
- Operator: DB Netz; DB Station&Service
- Line: Berlin Ringbahn
- Platforms: 1 island platform
- Tracks: 2
- Connections: (at Kaiserdamm); : 139, 218, X34, X49; : M49

Construction
- Accessible: Yes

Other information
- Station code: 6840
- DS100 code: BMN
- IBNR: 8089110
- Category: 4
- Fare zone: : Berlin A/5555
- Website: www.bahnhof.de

History
- Opened: 1916; 1993
- Closed: 1980
- Former names: Messe Nord/ICC (Witzleben)

Services
Preceding station	Berlin S-Bahn	Following station
Westkreuz One-way operation	S41	Westend Ringbahn (clockwise)
Westkreuz Ringbahn (counter-clockwise)	S42	Westend One-way operation
Westend Terminus	S46	Westkreuz towards Königs Wusterhausen
Location

Messe Nord/ZOB is a station in the Charlottenburg district of Berlin. It is located on the Ringbahn circle line, served by S-Bahn lines S41/S42 and S46. It is linked to the Kaiserdamm U-Bahn station on line U2 via a short footpath.

On 15 December 2024, the new name of the station was changed from Messe Nord/ICC (Witzleben).

== Overview ==
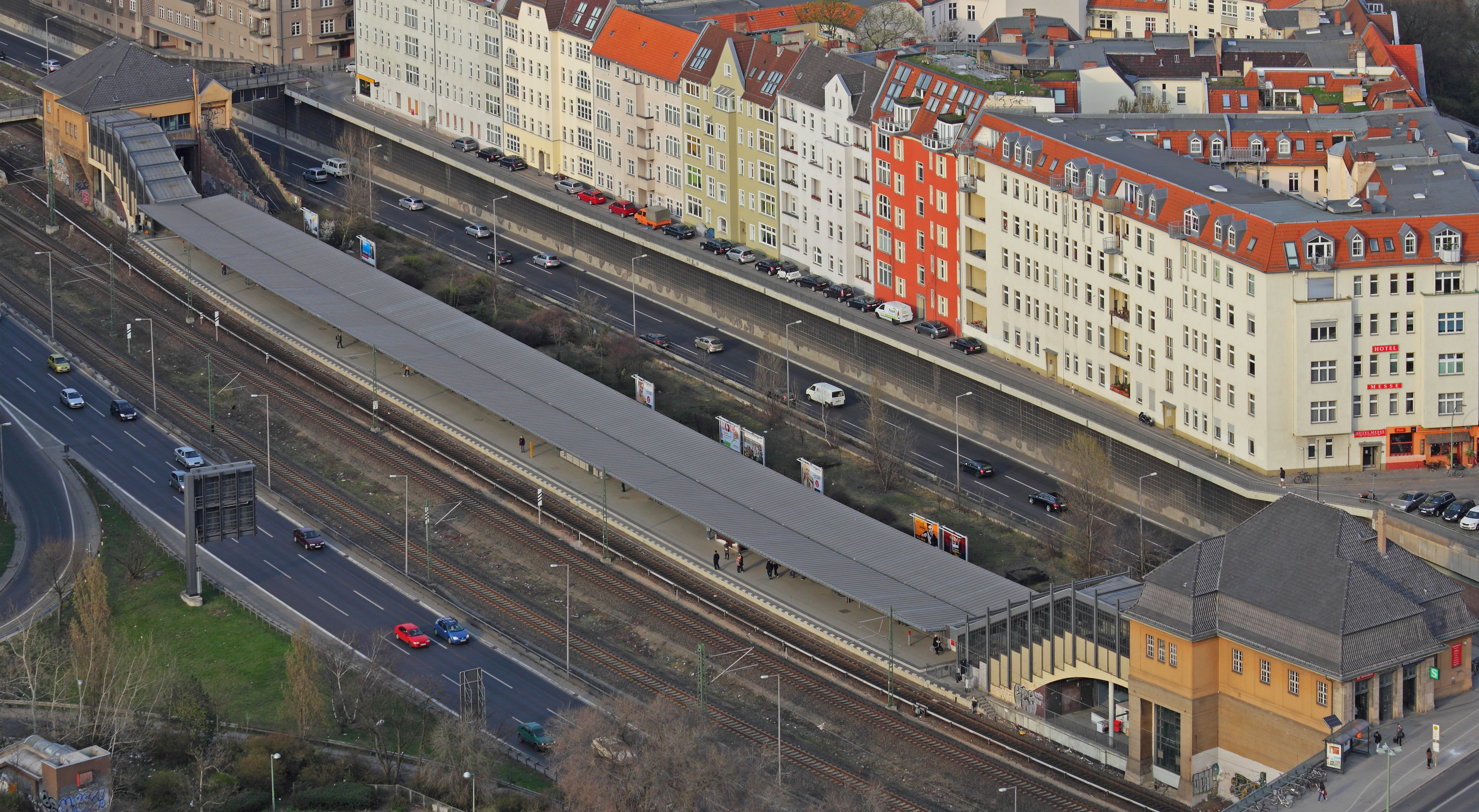
S-Bahn platform and Stadtring motorway

The station is located on the border with the Westend locality, very close to the Messe Berlin exhibition grounds and the International Congress Centrum (ICC) and the Zentraler Omnibusbahnhof Berlin (ZOB Berlin), which lend the station its name. Here the Ringbahn railway line runs in-between the carriageways of the parallel Bundesautobahn 100 (Stadtring) and can be reached from road and pedestrian bridges in the south and north.

The station is a listed monument of the State of Berlin. The monument protection covers the S-Bahn platform, built in its current form between 1913 and 1916, and the northern and southern entrance buildings.

== History ==
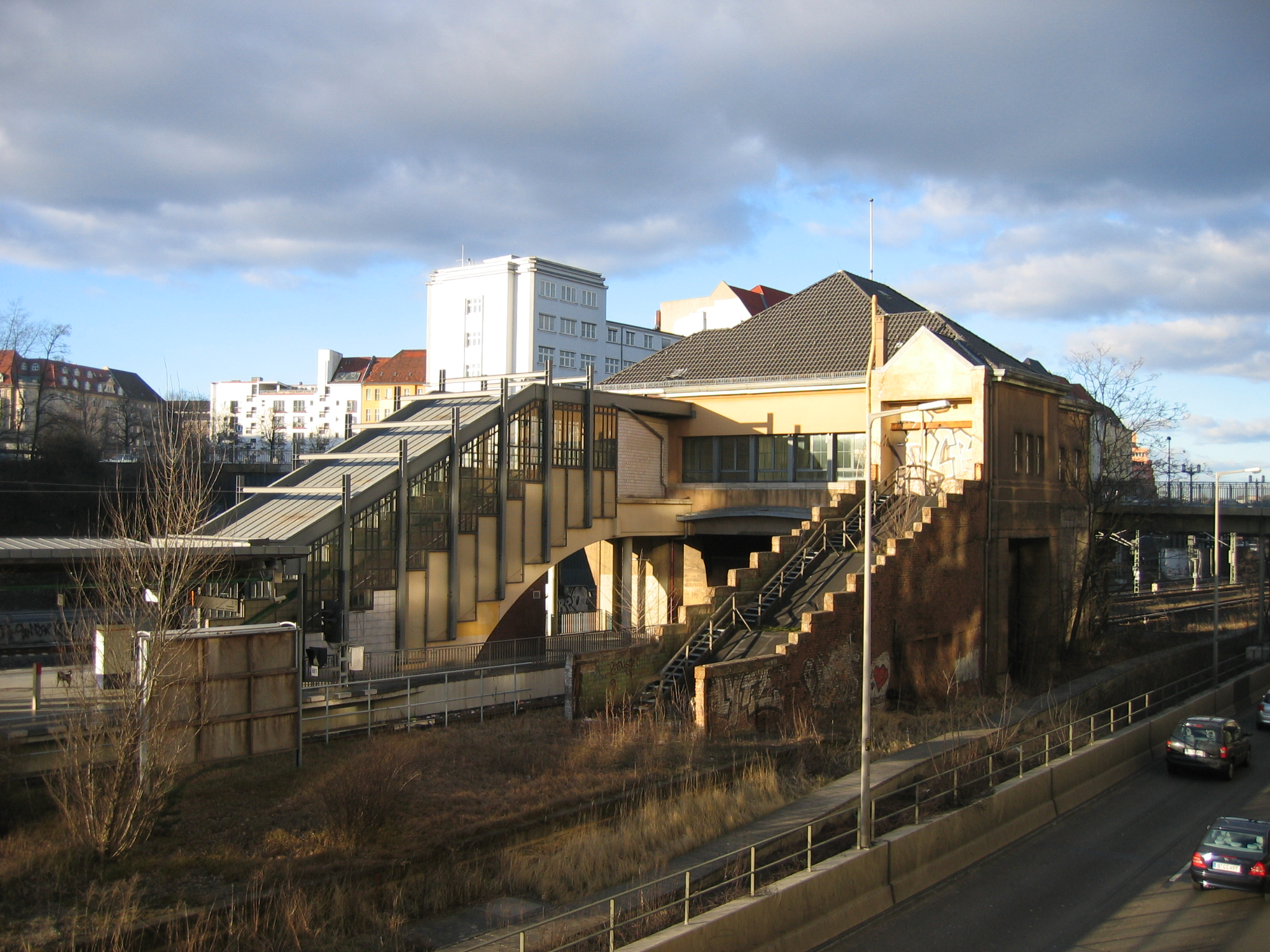
Northern station building with remains of the Stadtbahn platform

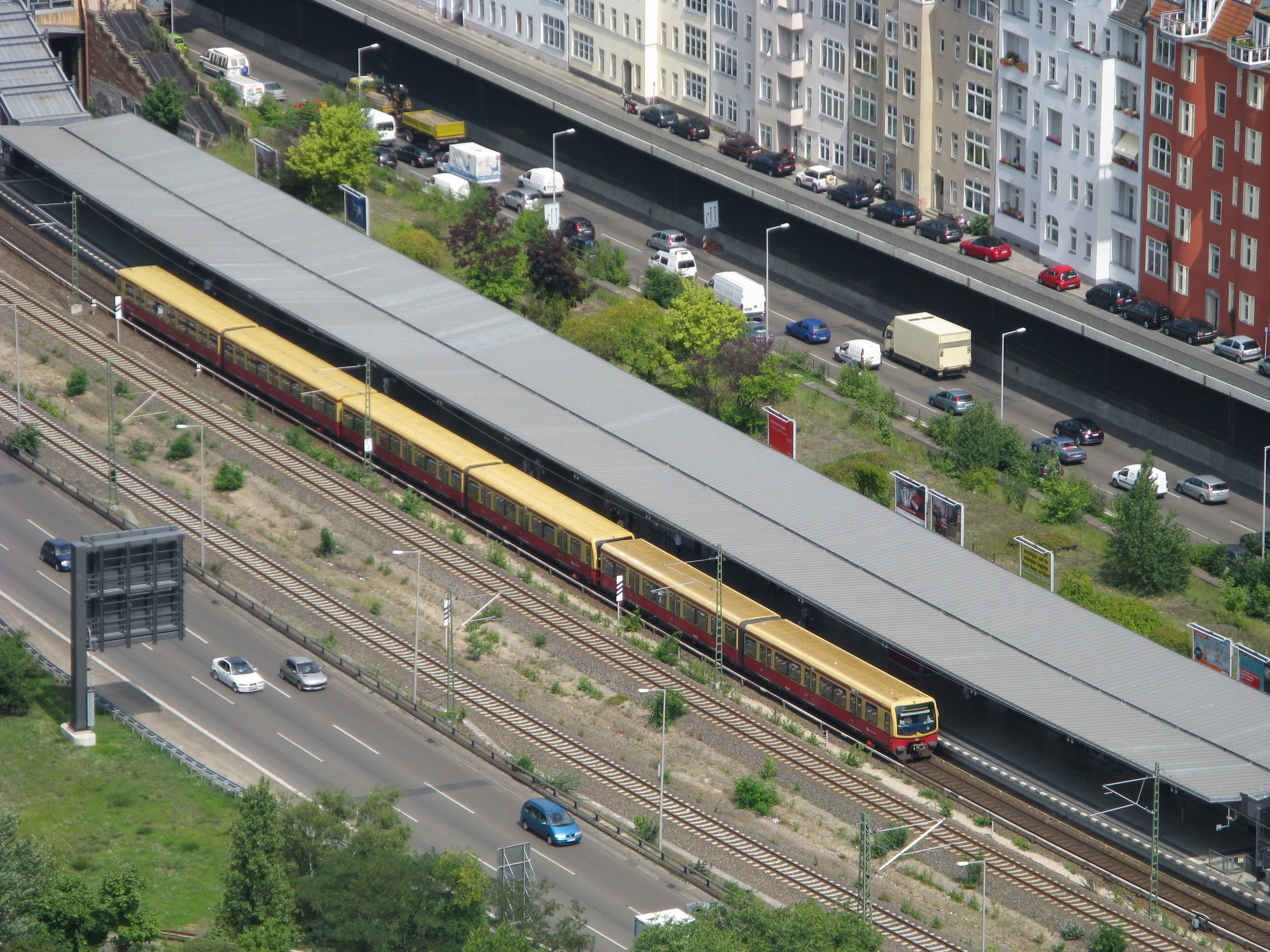
Messe Nord/ICC station seen from the Funkturm

The Charlottenburg U-Bahn line to Reichskanzlerplatz was extended in 1908 and passed under the Ringbahn at the Kaiserdamm bridge. A station was built on the Ringbahn over three years to enable interchange between the U-Bahn and the Ringbahn and opened to traffic as Witzleben on 1 April 1916. It was named after a former Charlottenburg manor to its east, which had been purchased by the Prussian general and minister Job von Witzleben in 1823. The station layout consisted of two symmetrically arranged island platforms, at the north and south end of which are two almost identical entrance buildings. The eastern platform was used for trains to and from the Stadtbahn, while the Ringbahn services stopped at the western one. The only track connecting the two lines was at the subsequent Westend station. In operational terms, Witzleben was considered a Haltepunkt (halt) on two parallel lines.

In 1944, operations on the connecting curve to Charlottenburg station and thus to the Stadtbahn were stopped due to bomb damage and did not restart after the Second World War. As a result, the Stadtbahn platform was no longer used and fell into disrepair. The Ringbahn platform, however, was still served. Due to the increasing separation of the city into two halves and ultimately the separation of the S-Bahn networks as well, the number of passengers decreased rapidly. The station was temporarily closed during the Berlin S-Bahn strike in 1980.

The station was reactivated when the Ringbahn reopened on 17 December 1993. The roof of the Ringbahn platform was repaired even before the plans for the recommissioning were finalised. It was also rebuilt to be more passenger-friendly and widened a little. Since then, the structure gauge of the S-Bahn trains has extended almost to the old Stadtbahn platform. To prevent unfamiliar passengers from getting off on the wrong side, warning signs and fences were installed on the platform that is no longer used. The unused staircase was demolished in mid-2015.

== Notable places nearby ==
- Zentraler Omnibusbahnhof Berlin
- Internationales Congress Centrum Berlin
- Messe Berlin
- Haus des Rundfunks
