= Kaiserdamm (disambiguation) =

Kaiserdaam may refer to-

- Kaiserdamm, a street in Berlin, Germany
- Kaiserdamm (Berlin U-Bahn), a U-Bahn station
- Császártöltés, a village in Hungary
