= Intercity buses in Germany =

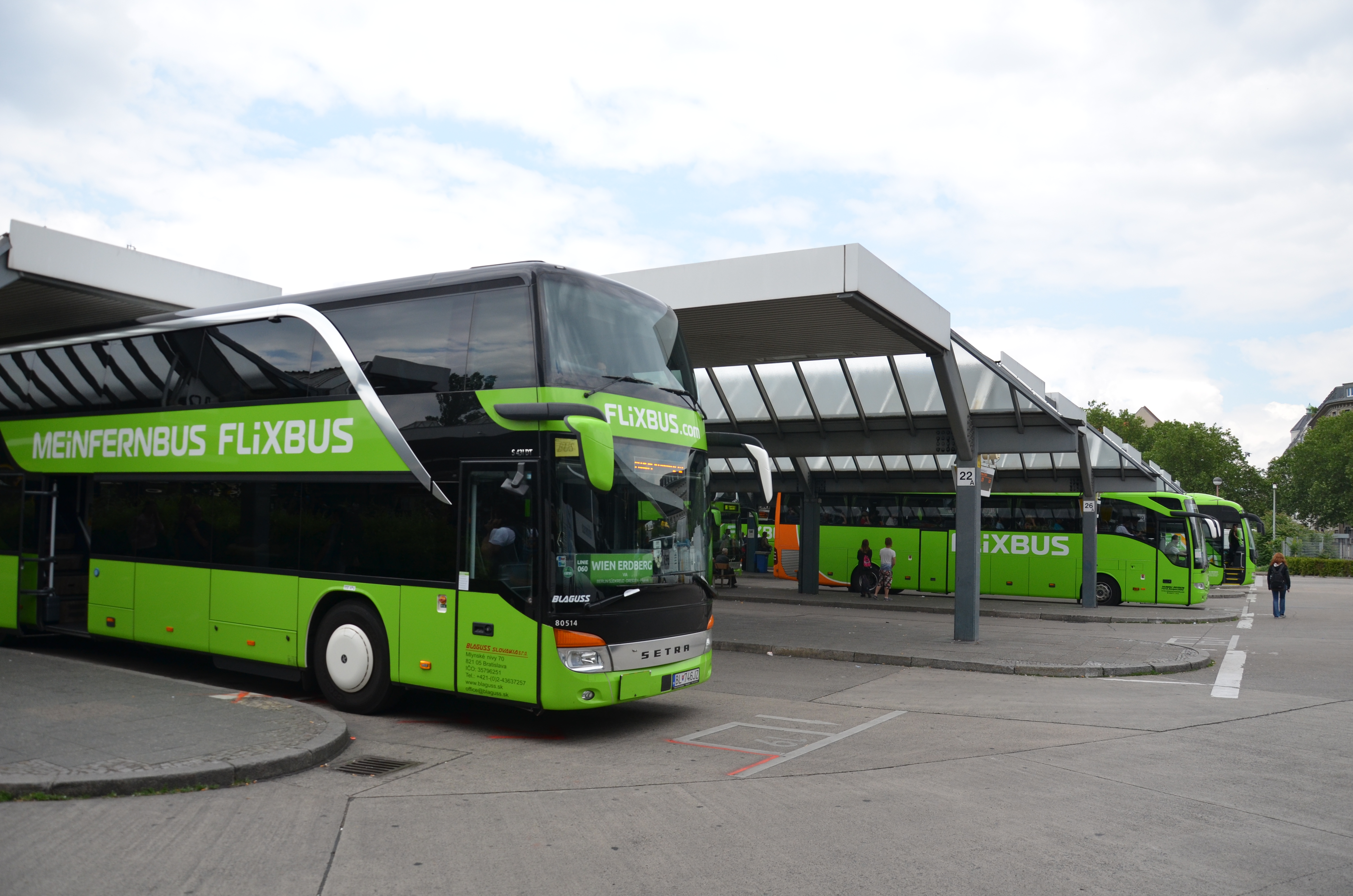
Flixbuses at Berlin's central bus station in 2016

Intercity bus services in Germany virtually did not exist until 2013, when the market was liberalised with the end of Deutsche Bahn's monopoly on long-distance passenger travel. Liberalisation led to the creation of a number of coach companies, including Flixbus (founded in 2011). Many of the initial companies failed or sold their business to Flixbus, including Postbus in 2017.
