= Zentraler Omnibusbahnhof Berlin =

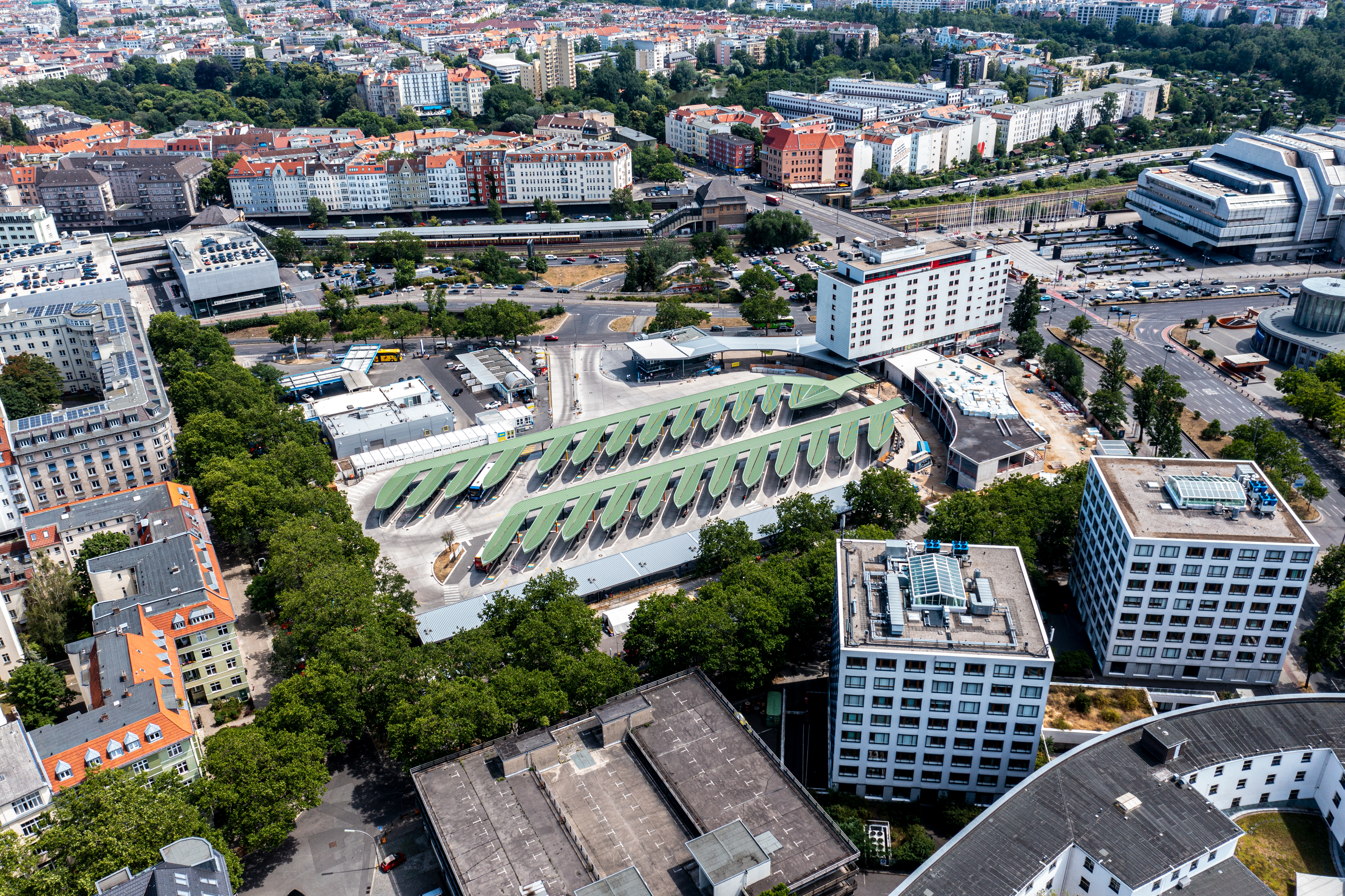
- 2022

General information
- Location: Messedamm 2-4; 14057 Berlin; Germany
- Coordinates: 52.5076°N 13.2798°E
- Owner: Berliner Verkehrsbetriebe
- Operator: IOB Internationale Omnibusbahnhof-Betreibergesellschaft mbH

Other information
- Website: www.zob.berlin

History
- Opened: May 1966; 60 years ago
Location

The Zentraler Omnibusbahnhof Berlin (short: ZOB Berlin) is a central bus station located at the Funkturm Berlin in the Berlin district Westend of the Charlottenburg-Wilmersdorf district. It was initiated by Gustav Severin (founder of the Association of Berlin Bus and Coach Operators) and went into operation in May 1966. It replaced the bus station on the Stuttgarter Platz since 1951 for bus traffic to West Germany.

The bus station is used exclusively for long-distance bus travel. A total of 35 bus and coach companies are available for regular and occasional services. The ZOB Berlin is an important point of domestic and international long-distance bus transport. It is open 24/7/365.

== Location ==
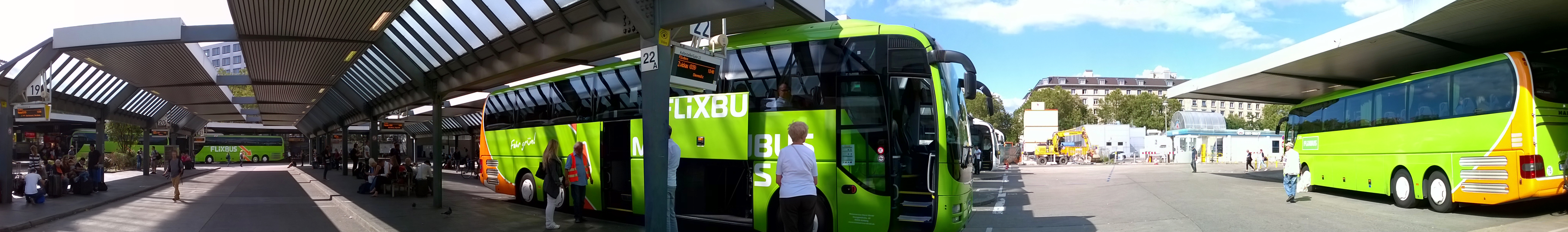
Panorama picture ZOB Berlin

The bus station is located on the western edge of the City West in the Masurenallee, right next to the Berliner Ringbahn and the parallel running Bundesautobahn 100 (Stadtautobahn) to the Messe Berlin. The Messe Nord/ZOB station on the circular railway (S41/S42, S46) and the Kaiserdamm underground station of the U2 underground line are about 300 and 350 metres away respectively. There is a direct connection to the bus station only via some bus lines of the Berliner Verkehrsbetriebe (BVG). The connection to the city centre is via the U2 underground line, whose station is two blocks north of Kaiserdamm; the journey from there to Zoo station takes eight minutes, to Alexanderplatz 28 minutes.

The immediate proximity to the city motorway (Bundesautobahn 100) and the AVUS (Bundesautobahn 115) is attractive for coach travel companies. This eliminates the congestion-prone and thus time-consuming journey through the city centre, which is often the case in other large cities.

== Operation ==
The ZOB has been operated since 2001 by the Internationale Omnibusbahnhof Betreibergesellschaft (IOB), a 100% subsidiary of the BVG.

However, the ticket counters are operated under the ZOB travel agency brand by Zentral-Omnibusbahnhof Berlin GmbH, a subsidiary of Bayern Express & P. Kühn Berlin. There are also ticket containers of other long-distance bus companies such as Flixbus and Eurolines at the ZOB. However, the IOB is responsible for the complete marketing of the buildings.

== Usage ==
In 2012, the ZOB recorded around 64,000 arrivals and departures with more than 3.2 million passengers and visitors, in the following year, the number rose to 99,870. In 2014, there were around 175,000 arrivals and departures and almost nine million passengers handled. The number of departures rose to 208,000 in 2015 and 214,000 in the following year, but in the course of market consolidation the number of departures dropped to 166,000 in 2017, with the number of passengers remaining almost unchanged at around six million. A corridor between 230,000 and 344,000 arrivals and departures is expected for 2019.

According to the IOB, 55 bus companies regularly use the ZOB, another ten companies stop at it in occasional traffic. From here, their lines connect Berlin with many parts of Europe. Due to Berlin's geographical location, the ZOB Berlin plays a special role as a gateway to Eastern Europe. The importance of the ZOB for the German capital is underlined, among other things, by its proximity to the exhibition grounds. Thus the ZOB is used particularly strongly to the trade fairs, like the Berlin International Green Week (IGW), the ITB Berlin (ITB) or the Internationale Funkausstellung Berlin (IFA)

== Basic Overhaul and Capacity Expansion ==
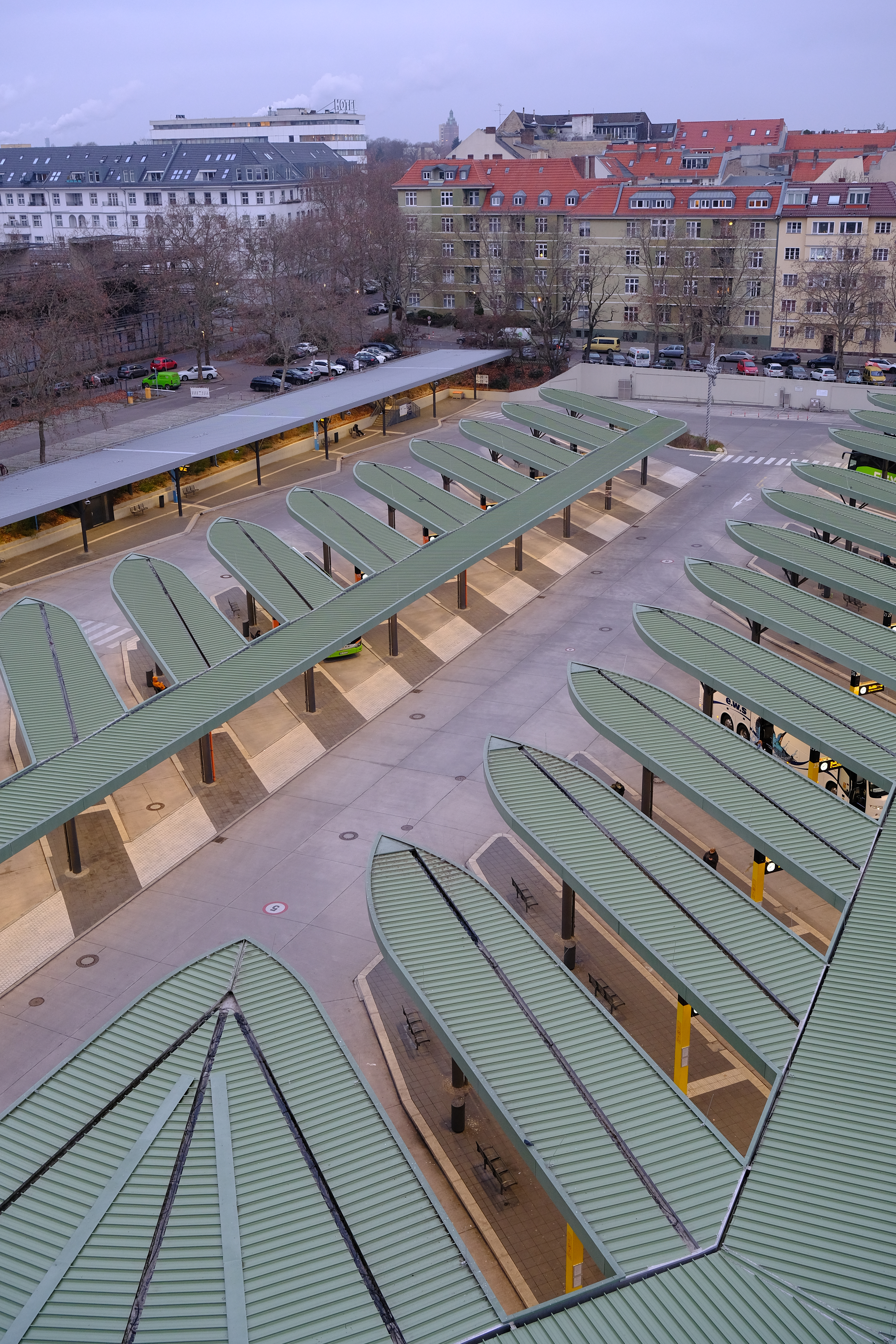
Roofing of the Berlin's Central Bus Station in 2025

A basic overhaul and capacity expansion is currently underway. The complete reconstruction of the traffic system and the inclusion of the existing bus parking area should make it possible to serve all bus stops independently of each other in the future, and their number should continue to rise to 37. In addition, a basic overhaul of the buildings including energetic renovation as well as an extension of the bus stop shelter in House A is planned. Construction was scheduled to begin in June 2016 and was then expected to take three years but ultimately took longer. Initially (as of 2013), EUR 3.7 million had been earmarked for this, plus EUR 5 million for the renovation of the bus stop shelter, the control centre and the toilet house. In 2016, for structural reasons, it was decided to demolish and completely rebuild two buildings instead. The waiting hall will be a two-storey terminal with a glass façade and will then offer 280 seats (previously 76) as well as gastronomic facilities. As a result, costs in the amount of 14 million euros were assumed. In the meantime, the estimated costs continued to rise, initially to 30 million euros in March 2018 and to 37.7 million euros in May 2018 according to press reports.

While buses are currently being handled at 27 stops, their number will increase to 33 as a result of the conversion, which will also halve the average handling time to 15 minutes.

On 21 November 2017 - at the end of the first reconstruction phase - the first ten renewed stop bays were put into operation. The renovation is expected to last until September 2022.

The first part of the new terminal building was opened on 22 March 2024.
