= Kaiserdamm =

Boulevard in Berlin, Germany

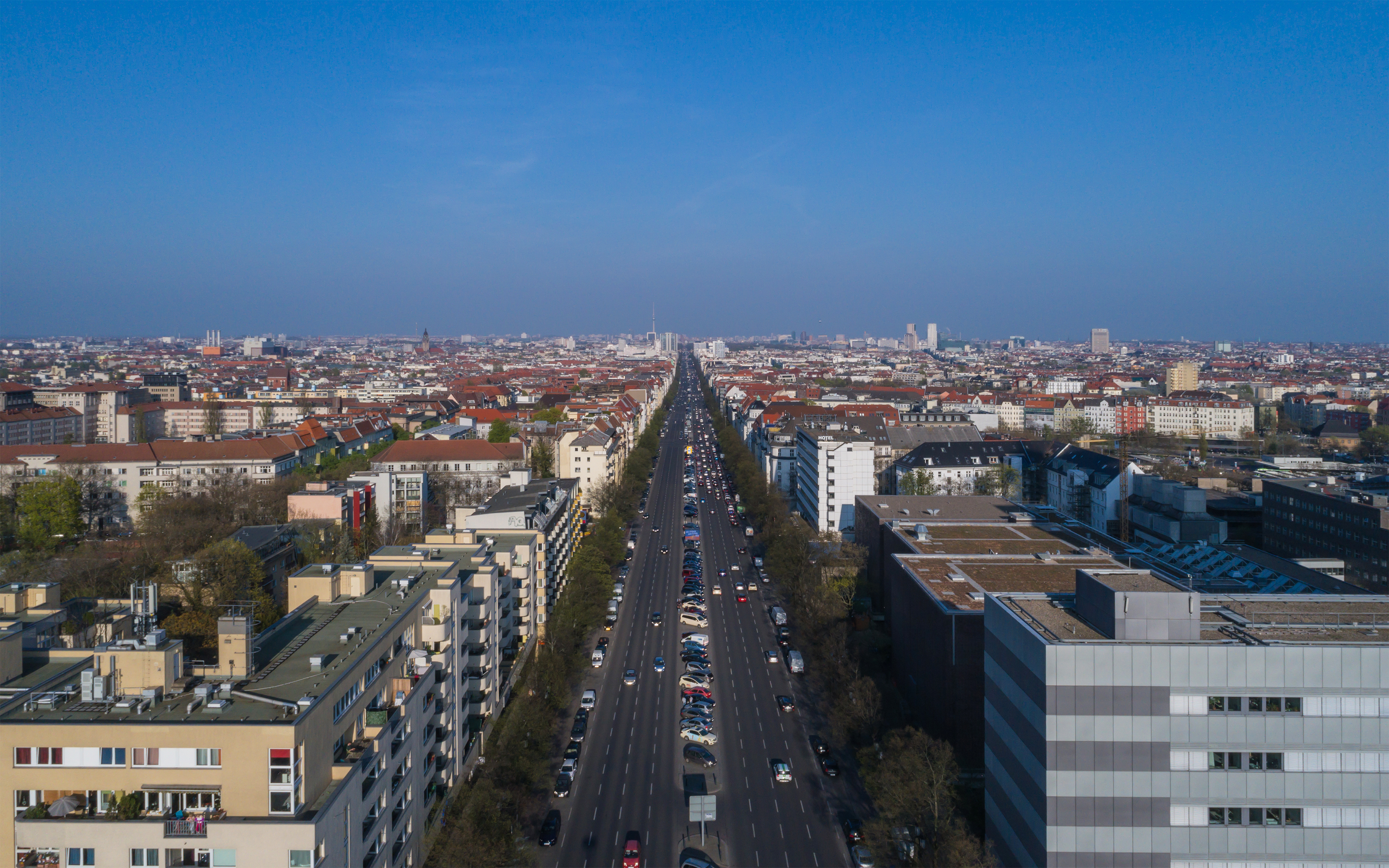
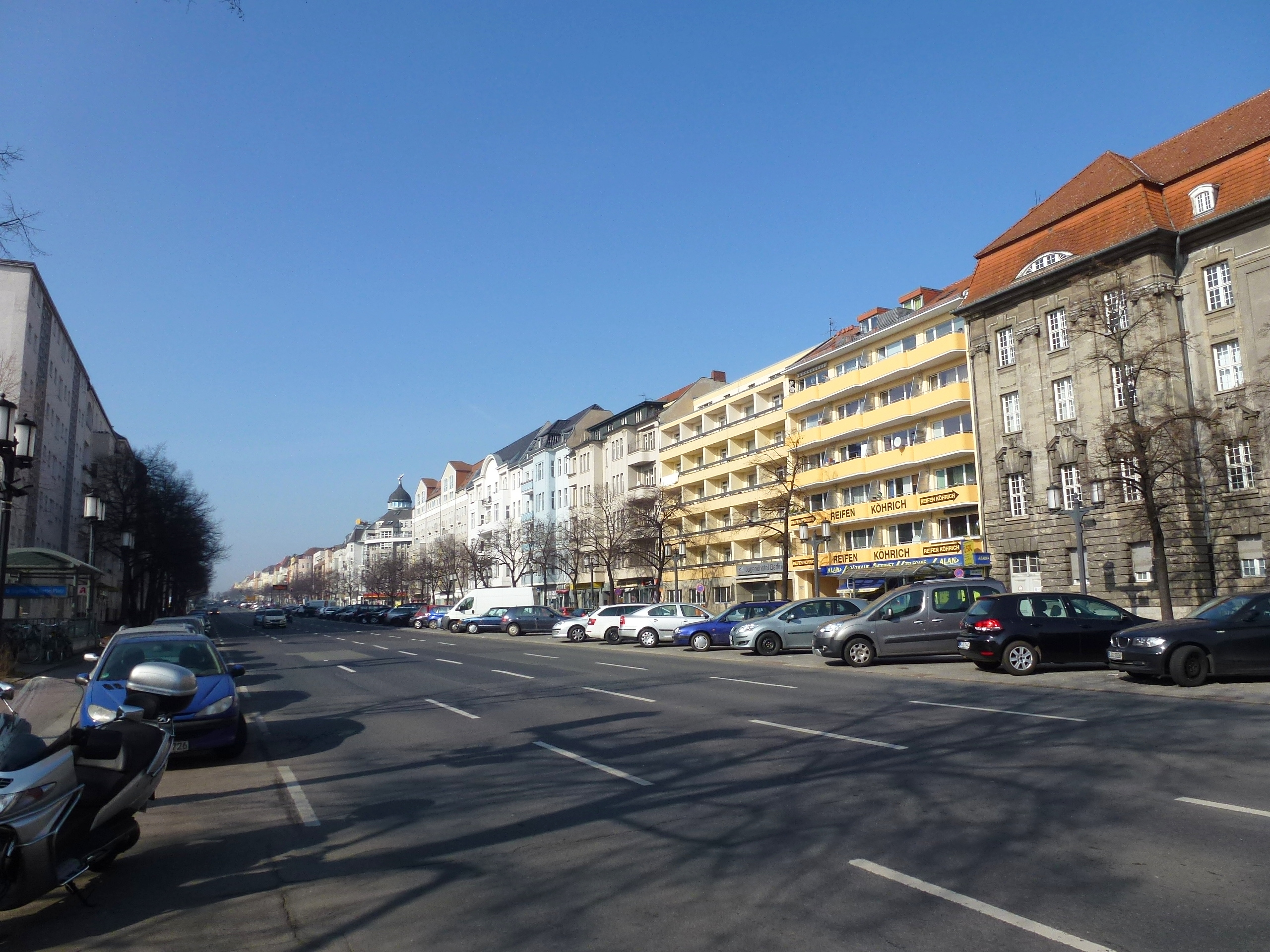
- Kaiserdamm in Westend, view to the east Kaiserdamm in Charlottenburg, view to the west
- Interactive map of Kaiserdamm
- Former names: Adenauerdamm; (1967–1968)
- Part of: Bundesstraße 2; Bundesstraße 5
- Namesake: Kaiser Wilhelm II
- Type: Boulevard
- Length: 1,680 m (5,510 ft)
- Location: Berlin, Germany
- Quarter: Westend, Charlottenburg
- Nearest metro station: Bismarckstraße; Sophie-Charlotte-Platz; Kaiserdamm; Theodor-Heuss-Platz
- Coordinates: 52°30′37″N 13°17′06″E
- East end: Bismarckstraße; Schloßstraße; Suarezstraße; Sophie-Charlotte-Platz
- Major junctions: Witzlebenstraße; Witzlebenplatz; Erwin-Barth-Platz; Sophie-Charlotten-Straße; Riehlstraße; Saldernstraße; Rognitzstraße; Stülpnagelstraße; Königin-Elisabeth-Straße; Messedamm; Meerscheidtstraße; Soorstraße; Ahornallee
- West end: Theodor-Heuss-Platz; Reichsstraße; Masurenallee; Heerstraße

Kaiserdamm is a boulevard in the Westend and Charlottenburg districts of Berlin, Germany.

== Route ==
Kaiserdamm is a 50m wide road, that runs for 1,680 metres (5,510 ft) between Sophie-Charlotte-Platz in the east to Theodor-Heuss-Platz in the west. It forms a westward continuation of Bismarckstraße, Straße des 17. Juni and the Unter den Linden boulevard.

== History ==
Originally an unpaved track, the road was inaugurated at the behest of Wilhelm II (after whom it is named), and opened to traffic in 1906. The road was rebuilt in 1939 as part of the East-West Axis of the planned Welthauptstadt Germania, and much of the road as it is today dates from this time.

== Buildings ==
Kaiserdamm is served by the Kaiserdamm U-Bahn station positioned halfway between the Theodor-Heuss-Platz U-Bahn station and Sophie-Charlotte-Platz U-Bahn stations.

Prominent buildings on the road include the studios of Rundfunk Berlin-Brandenburg at the corner of Theodor-Heuss-Platz and the former police headquarters with the address Kaiserdamm 1.
