= Berlin-Westend station =

Railway station in Charlottenburg-Wilmersdorf, Germany

Westend
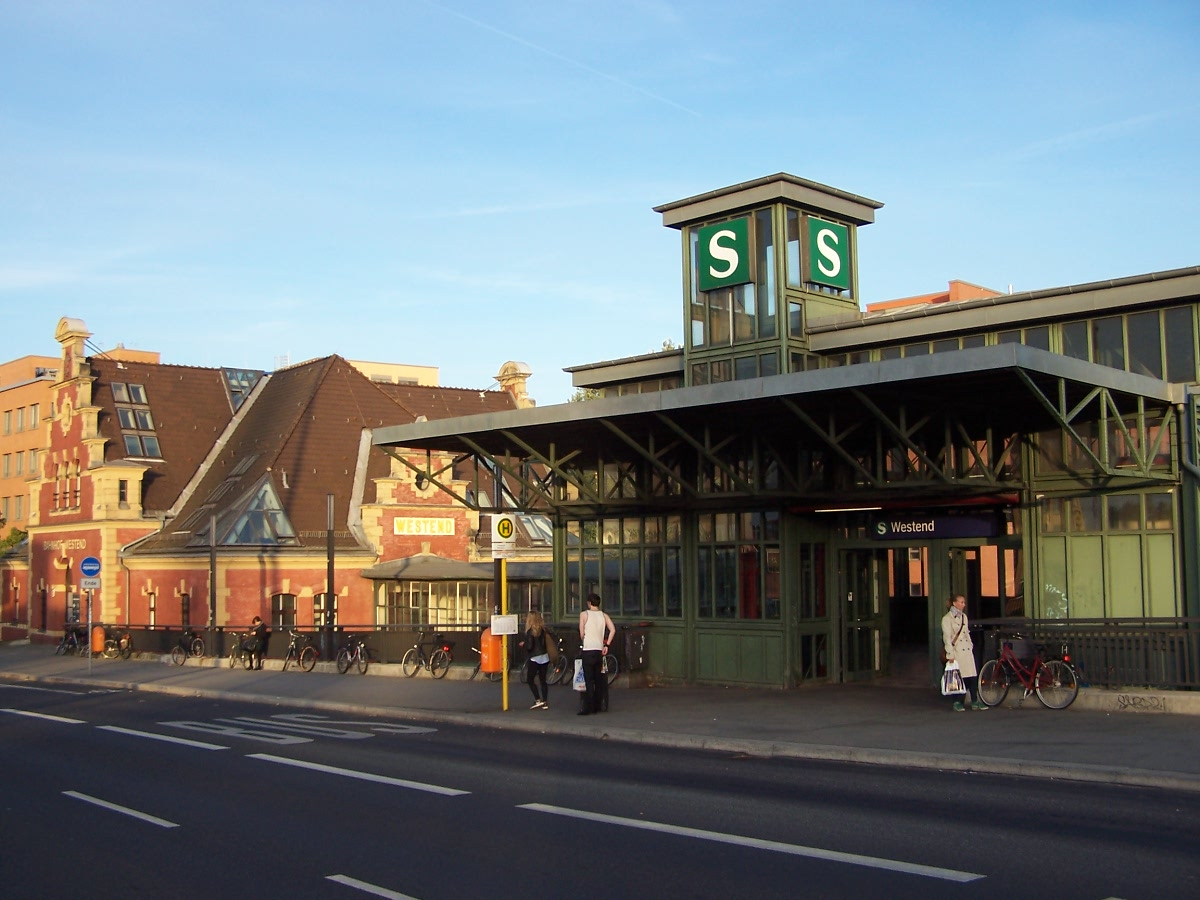
- Old and new reception building

General information
- Location: Charlottenburg-Wilmersdorf, Berlin, Berlin; Germany
- Coordinates: 52°31′05″N 13°17′04″E
- Owner: Deutsche Bahn
- Operator: DB Netz; DB Station&Service
- Line: Ringbahn
- Platforms: 1
- Tracks: 2

Construction
- Accessible: Yes

Other information
- Station code: 6708
- DS100 code: BWES
- IBNR: 8089111
- Category: 4
- Fare zone: : Berlin A/5555
- Website: www.bahnhof.de

History
- Opened: 1877; 1993
- Closed: 1980

Services
Preceding station	Berlin S-Bahn	Following station
Messe Nord/ICC One-way operation	S41	Jungfernheide Ringbahn (clockwise)
Messe Nord/ICC Ringbahn (counter-clockwise)	S42	Jungfernheide One-way operation
Terminus	S46	Messe Nord/ICC towards Königs Wusterhausen
Location

Westend is a station in the Charlottenburg district of Berlin. It is located on the Ringbahn circle line, served by the S-Bahn lines S41, S42 and S46. It is named after the Westend locality, which is immediately adjacent to the station grounds. The entire station area was opened—as Charlottenburg-Westend—in several stages from 15 November 1877, but it has since been reduced to an S-Bahn platform and a pair of long-distance tracks. The station was closed temporarily in 1980 because of the S-Bahn strike. A platform on the Ringbahn was reopened in 1993 for S-Bahn traffic. The restoration of all of the station infrastructure is not planned.

== Structure and history ==
The station complex is at the overpass of the Spandauer Damm over Ringbahn. It was originally built to serve the Westend villa estate (Villenkolonie). The station complex was at its maximum size between its first major expansion in 1884 and the turn of the century, with four platforms and several passing tracks. The four platforms were designated A to D from east to west. The first three were connected by an underpass.

Rail traffic on the western section of the Ring was closed in 1980. After that, the station building was empty until 1988. It was used by the Freundeskreis der Universität der Künste (friends of the Berlin University of the Arts) as a studio and exhibition building (Künstlerbahnhof—artist station) until 2001. It was then used as an office building for various trades.

Platform C was reopened with the southern Ringbahn in 1993. Two new entrance structures from the Spandauer-Damm bridge were built of steel and glass for this occasion.

Today there are storage sidings and turnbacks both north and south of the platforms.

=== Entrance building ===
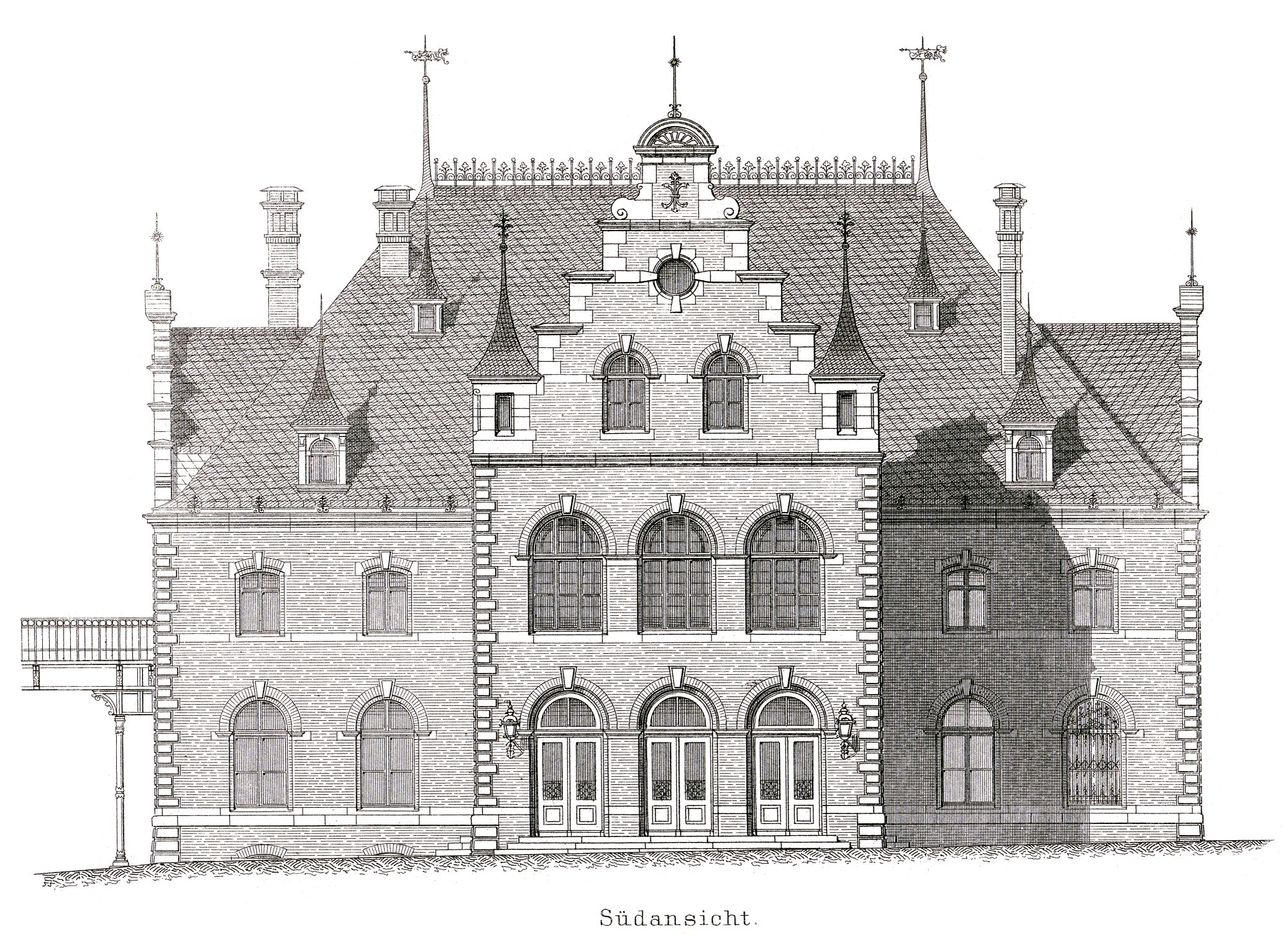
Southern side of the entrance building

The listed entrance building adjoins the former suburban terminal station to the north and has exits to Spandauer Damm and the station forecourt east of the facility. It was built in 1884 to a design by the office of the architects Heinrich Joseph Kayser and Karl von Großheim. The Renaissance Revival building had no direct access to the platforms, the passengers either walked through the building to an open area to the east of the station and through a pedestrian tunnel to the platforms, or directly approached the individual platforms from Spandauer Damm. Only the latter access is still in operation and only to the Ringbahn platform. The building was extensively renovated in 1976 and 1985.

=== Platforms ===
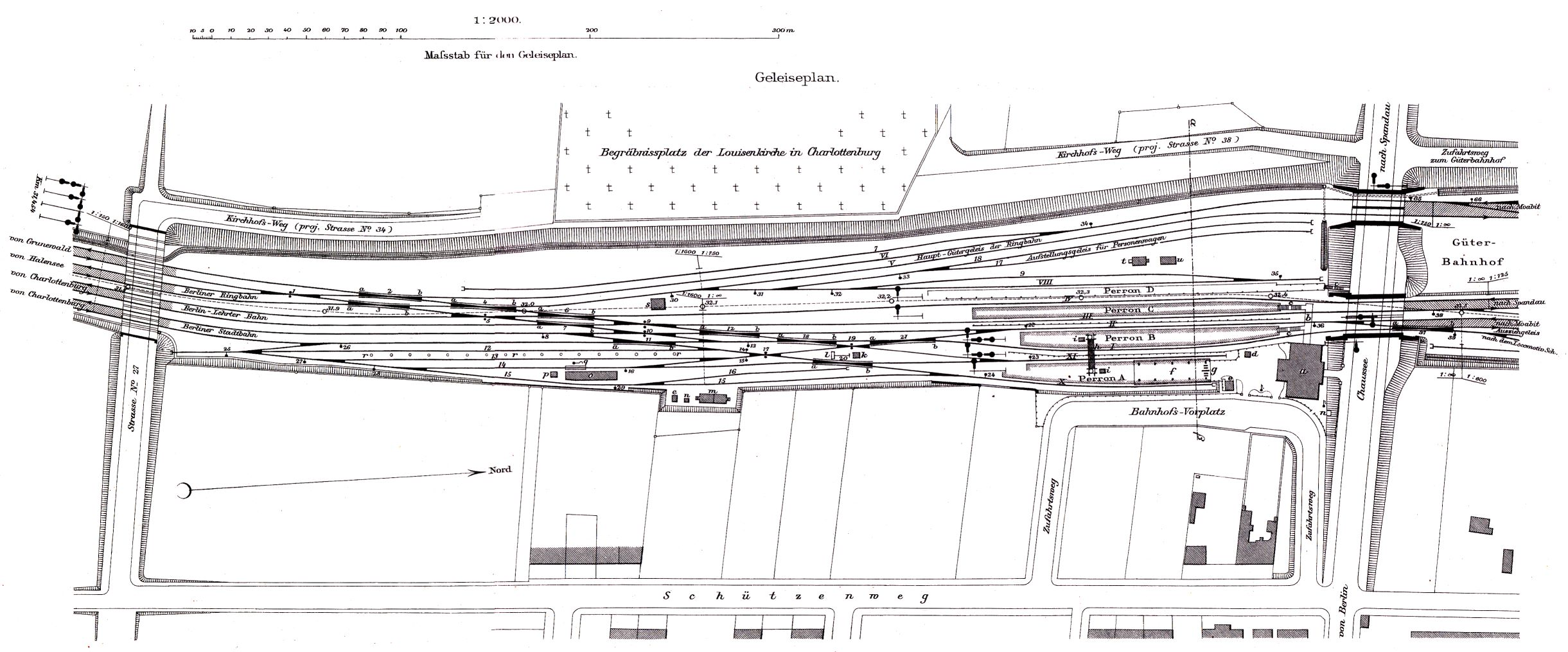
Track plan of 1887

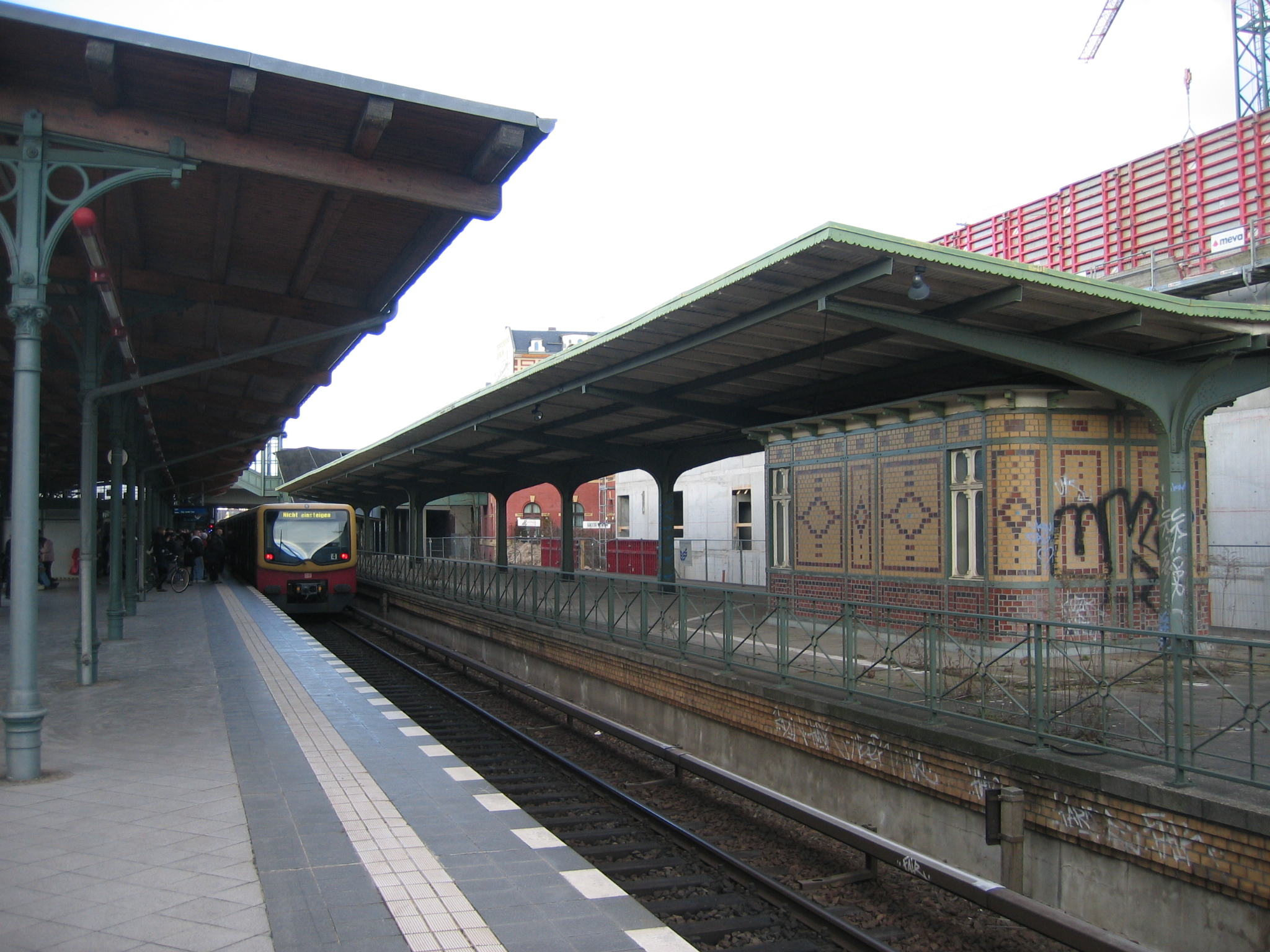
Platforms (left C, right B)

Platform A served as the terminal station for the local traffic of the Stadtbahn, which ran over the Ringbahn in the early years of the line. The tracks ended at the platform, which was connected to the station building to the north. The platform was not electrified in 1928 and was not used from then on. It was removed after 1945. There is a footpath on the site today.

Platform B served the trains of the Berlin–Lehrte railway and the Stadtbahn that continued south of Westend on the Ringbahn. From the south, there was the option for Ringbahn trains to also approach the platform, the same option was available for Stadtbahn trains that did not terminate at platform A. The platform B track continued north of the station on the Berlin–Lehrte long-distance tracks. After the electrification of the lines in 1928, the pair of tracks on the Berlin–Lehrte line were no longer regularly used, but were sometimes used by Stadtbahn trains. From then on, Ringbahn and Stadtbahn trains shared platform B and the neighbouring western platform. A two-track bypass was built behind it, which was necessary for electric Stadtbahn trains that were not continuing to the northern Ringbahn. Around 1944, the traffic on the platform ended because the connecting curve from the Stadtbahn to the northern Ringbahn was closed. The platform still exists, but it is cut off from the tracks and can no longer be used as a result of the widening of the neighbouring platform. Platform A, like the current Platform B, had a row of massive steel supports laid out in a single row.

Platform C on the Ringbahn is the only one of the four platforms that is still used today. It was built together with the other platforms during a renovation in 1884 and is somewhat wider than the neighbouring Stadtbahn platform. The structure of the platforms and its connecting track network remained roughly unchanged until the reopening in 1993. After that, the platform was widened significantly, so that trains headed for Jungfernheide now stop at platforms C and B. In contrast to the other two suburban platforms, the platform canopy is supported by a row of columns, as is common for Berlin stations built at the turn of the century. The platform has barrier-free access via two lifts. The construction of an additional access at the southern end of the platform towards Sophie-Charlotten-Straße to be completed in 2020 is planned.

Platform D was on the mainline tracks of the line and served as a terminal station for trains running from the Berlin-Blankenheim railway (Wetzlar Railway) to the Ringbahn. However, as a direct connection was opened from the Wetzlar Railway to the Stadtbahn as early as 1882, the platform was never very important. It was closed before the turn of the twentieth century and was removed shortly afterwards.
