= Internationales Congress Centrum Berlin =

Conference centre in Germany

Coordinates: 52°30′16″N 13°16′50″E

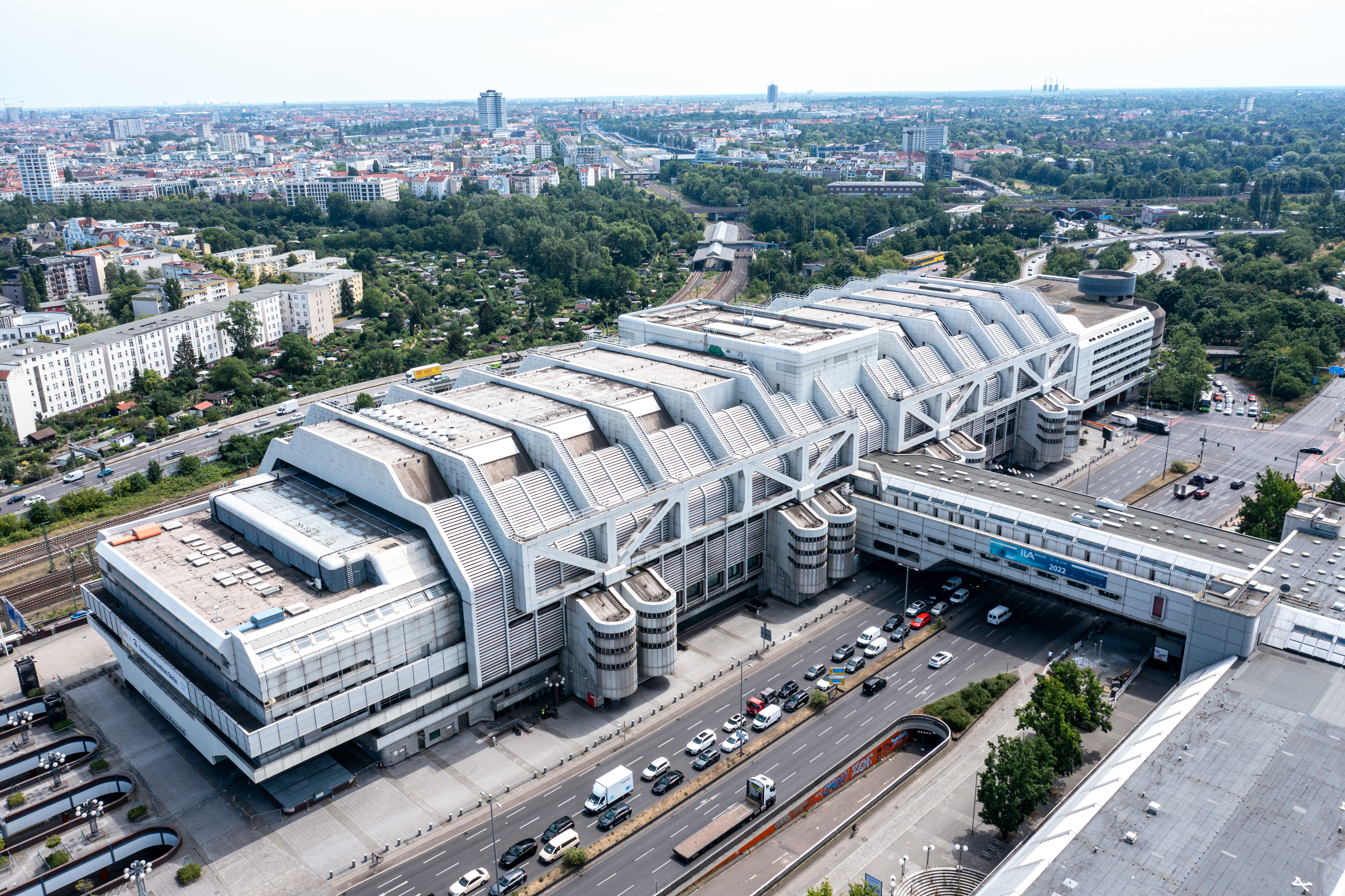
- ICC Berlin
- Interactive map of the Internationales Congress Centrum Berlin area

General information
- Architectural style: High-tech
- Location: Messedamm 22, 14055 Berlin, Germany
- Construction started: 1975
- Opened: 1979
- Closed: 2014

Height
- Height: 40 m (130 ft)

Technical details
- Material: Concrete, steel, glass

Design and construction
- Architects: Ursulina Schüler-Witte and Ralf Schüler

Other information
- Public transit: Messe Nord/ZOB

Website
- icc.berlin/en/

The Internationales Congress Centrum Berlin (ICC Berlin) is a former convention centre in the Westend locality of Berlin, adjacent to the Messe Berlin exhibition grounds. Designed by Ralf Schüler and Ursulina Schüler-Witte and built between 1973 and 1979, the aluminium-clad building is a major example of high-tech architecture. With 80 halls and rooms and capacity for up to 20,000 people, it was one of the largest congress centres in Europe and became a landmark of West Berlin.

Regular operations ended in 2014 because the ageing building required extensive renovation. It has since remained closed, with occasional temporary uses. The building was designated a protected monument in 2019.

In 2024, Berlin launched a redevelopment process for the ICC. In June 2026, the Project Partnership Quartier ICC received an official recommendation for a proposal to reuse the building for events and the creative industries. The project is still in development.

== Overview ==
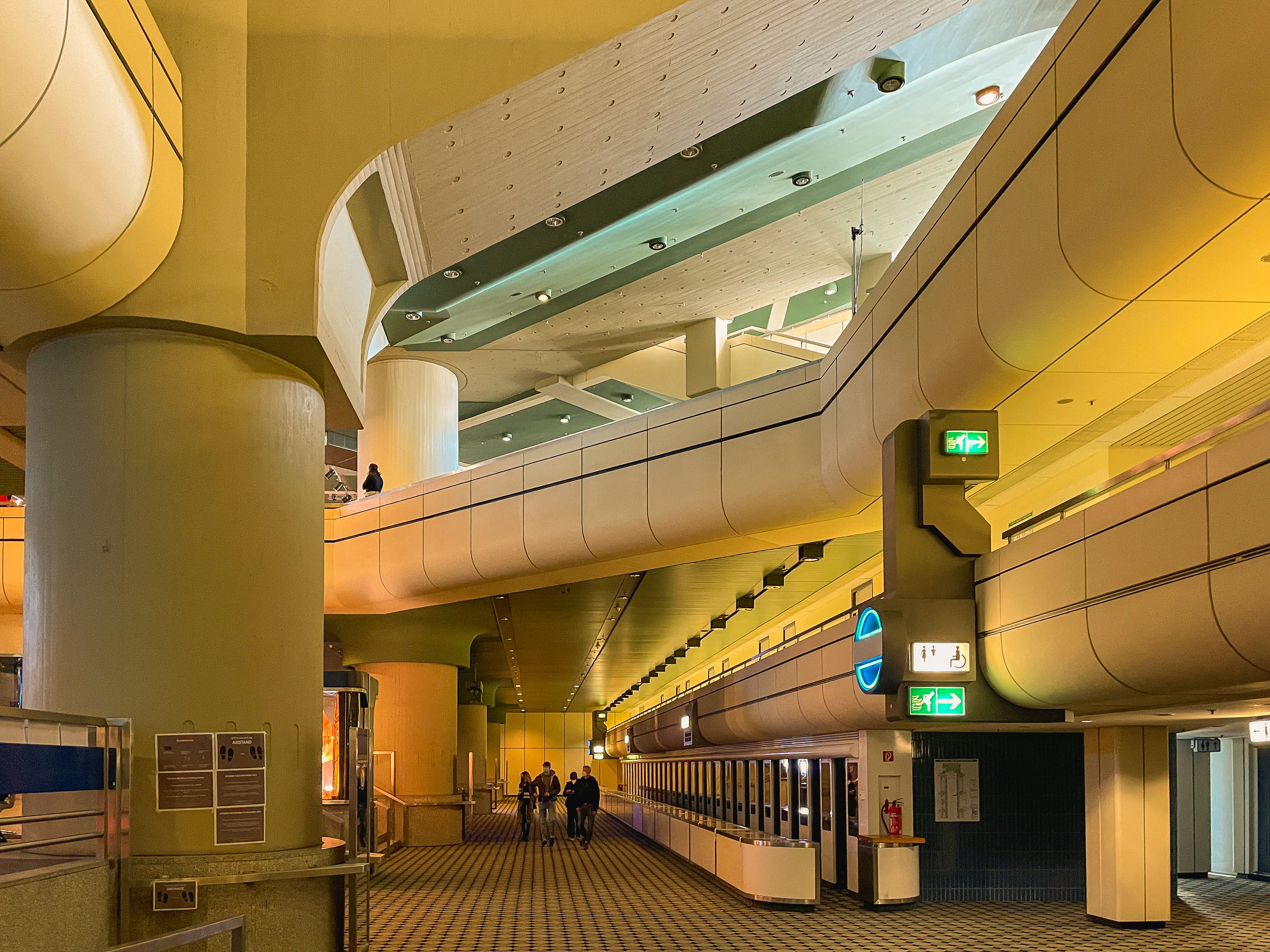
Interior of the ICC in 2021

Under the division of Germany, the ICC was built within the enclave of West Berlin. The enclave's prior conference venue, the Kongresshalle (now Haus der Kulturen der Welt), had an outdated capacity of only 1,200 people. Additionally, the East German government headquartered in East Berlin had begun construction in 1973 of the modernist Palace of the Republic, turning the construction of the ICC into an ideological soft power competition of the Cold War, intended to demonstrate the superiority of West Germany's social market economy model.

Construction of ICC Berlin began in 1975 and it opened in 1979, three years after the opening of the Palace of the Republic. The architects were Ursulina Schüler-Witte and Ralf Schüler. The conference center is 313 metres (1,027 ft) long, 80 m (260 ft) wide and 40 m (130 ft) tall. With a cost of almost one billion marks, it was the most expensive construction in West Berlin at the time, eclipsing Hans Scharoun's postwar building for the Berlin State Library.

The building has an aluminum facade and was designed to accommodate over 20,000 participants in any major conference. The conference center has 80 conference rooms of varying size, the largest conference room being 6,000 square meters. The main auditorium was planned for 5,000 people. Hall 2 could accommodate around 4,000 visitors. The commission was for a infrastructure project that was supposed to impress. So the participants of a conference could talk into a microphone from any seat. The staircases and foyers were intentionally futuristic, with geometric Op Art carpets for visitors to walk on and an innovative guidance system consisting of red and blue fluorescent tubes.

The facility does not have its own campus and is linked to the neighboring Messe Berlin fairgrounds, so conferences often joined trade shows and exhibitions.

It was one of Europe's biggest conference centers, at a time when Berlin was one of the top congress cities in the world. It is serviced by S-Bahn station Messe Nord/ZOB. By its own reckoning, ICC Berlin is a landmark of post-war German architecture and has served as an inspiration for similar facilities around the globe.

== Closure and redevelopment ==
By 2014, the ICC's ageing technical systems required extensive renovation, and regular congress operations ended on 10 April that year. Renovation plans also had to address asbestos in the building, which increased the projected cost of the work.

== In popular culture ==
The ICC features prominently in the disco musical The Apple (1980), in which it appears as a futuristic concert venue. Many of the film's exterior and interior scenes were filmed in and around the building.

The venue appears in the Wim Wenders film Wings of Desire (1987).

On 19 and 20 October 1990, the American rock band Grateful Dead played two concerts in the main hall at the ICC as part of their European tour.

In 1999, the pedestrian tunnel was used as a set for the popular dance track "Around the World (La La La La La)" by German Eurodance group ATC.

The film The International (2009) was partly filmed in the interior of the ICC.
