= Kaiserdamm station =

Berlin U-Bahn station

Kaiserdamm
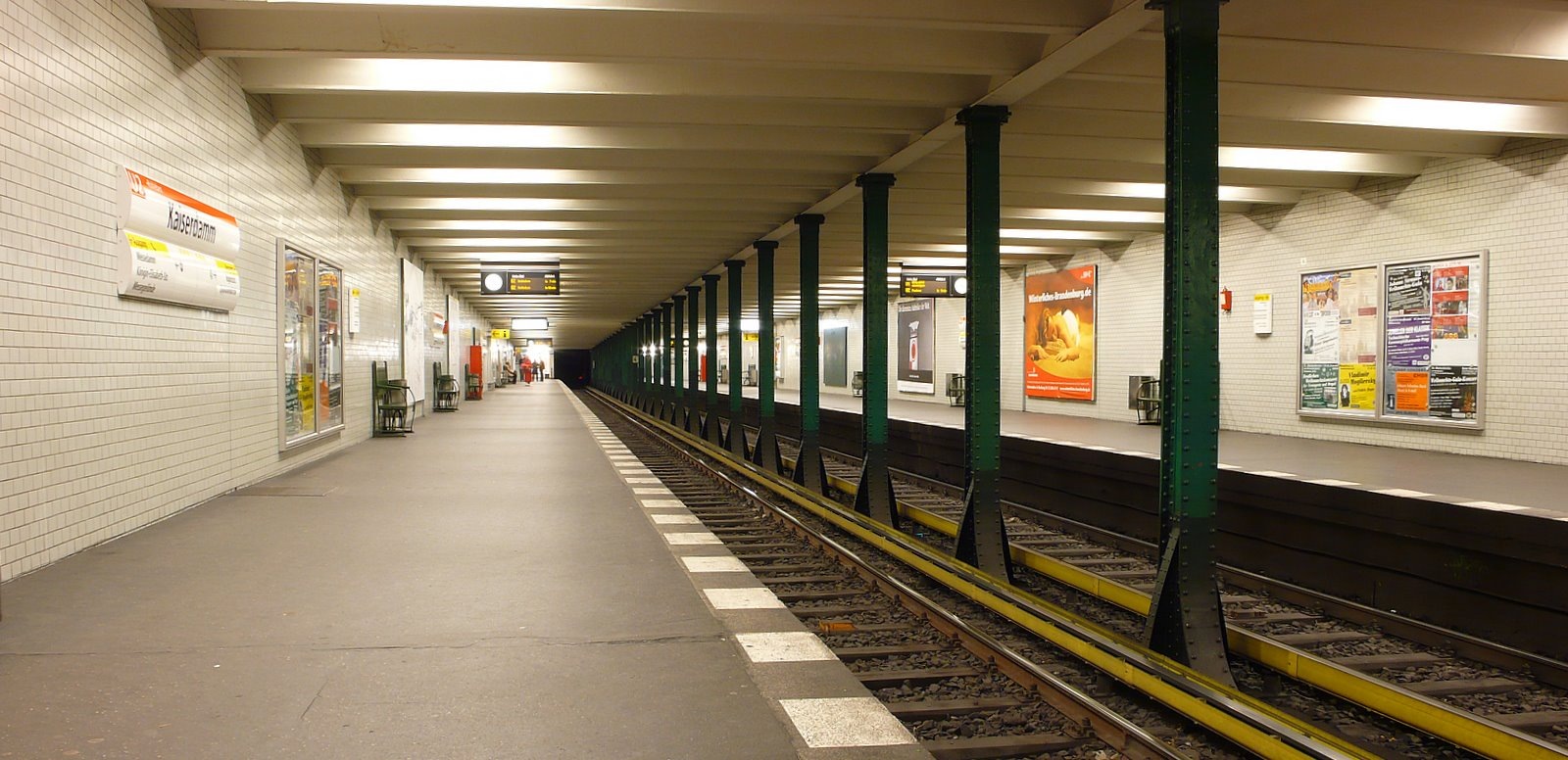
- Platform view of Kaiserdamm station

General information
- Location: Kaiserdamm/Messedamm; Witzleben, Berlin; Germany
- Coordinates: 52°30′36″N 13°16′56″E
- Owner: Berliner Verkehrsbetriebe
- Operator: Berliner Verkehrsbetriebe
- Platforms: 2 side platforms
- Tracks: 2
- Connections: (at Messe Nord/ICC); : 139, N2

Construction
- Structure type: Underground
- Cycle facilities: No
- Accessible: No

Other information
- Fare zone: : Berlin A/5555

History
- Opened: 29 March 1908; 118 years ago

Services
| Preceding station | Berlin U-Bahn | Following station |
|---|---|---|
| Theodor-Heuss-Platz towards Ruhleben | U2 | Sophie-Charlotte-Platz towards Pankow |
Location
- Location within Berlin

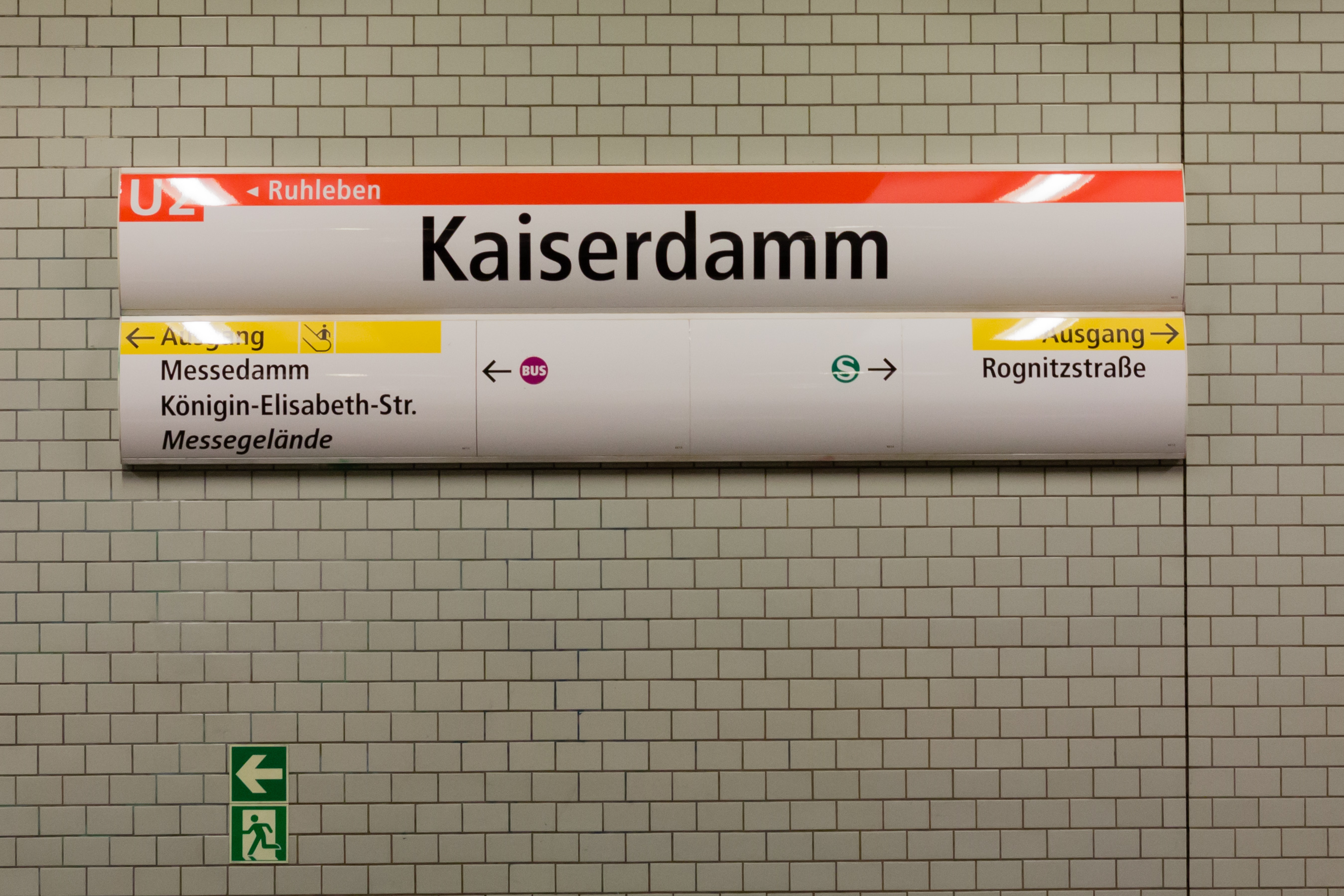
Station sign

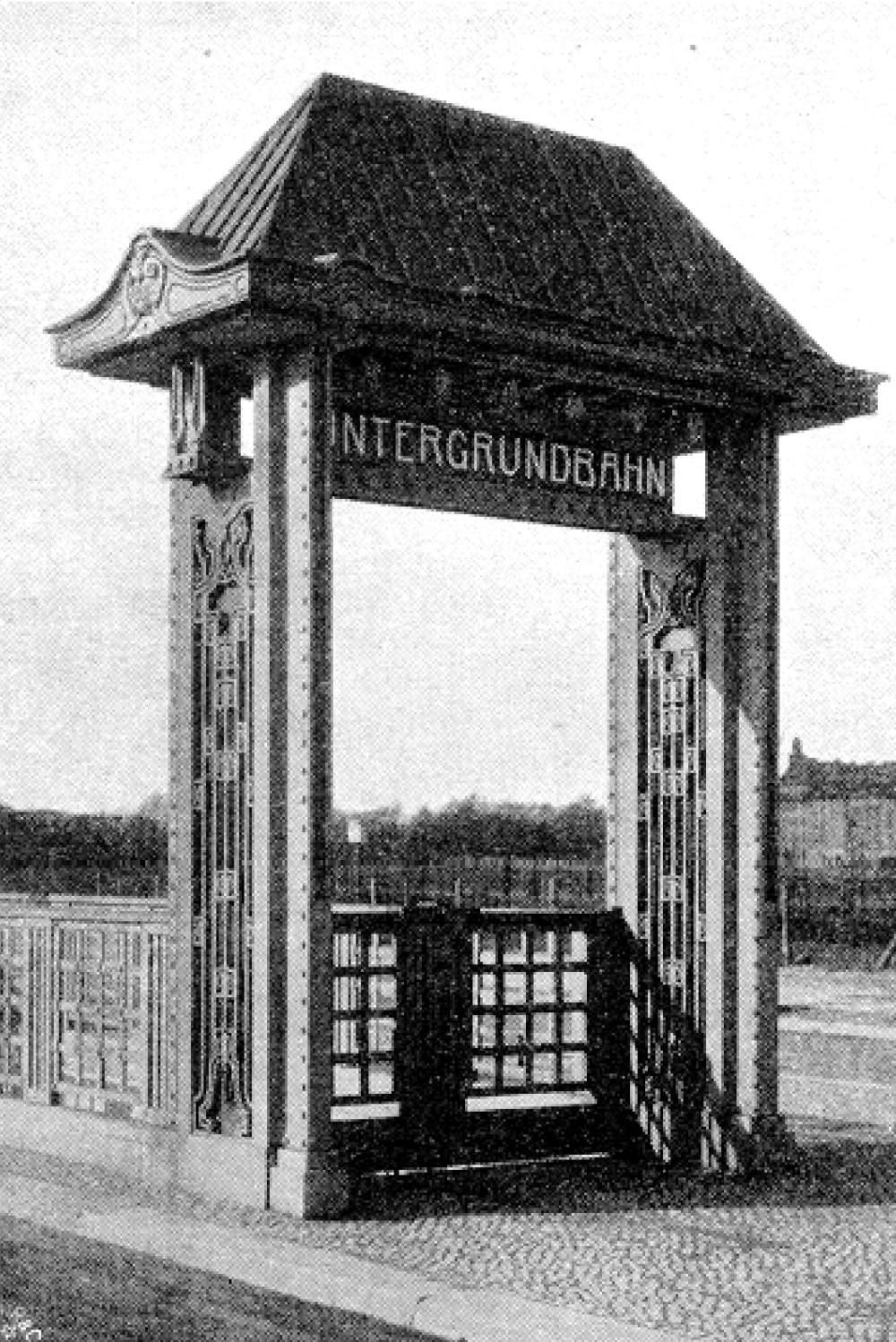
Entrance to the station, 1908

Kaiserdamm is a Berlin U-Bahn station located on line U2. It is linked to the Messe Nord/ICC station of the Berlin S-Bahn.

Opened in 1908, this station was built by A. Grenander. In 1936, it was renamed to Kaiserdamm/Messedamm; in 1967 it got the name Adenauerdamm (Messedamm). However, protests from the people living nearby led to another change to the former name (Adenauer — the chancellor of West Germany was not well liked in Berlin in these days).

== See also ==
- Messe Berlin
- International Congress Centrum
- Zentraler Omnibusbahnhof Berlin
