= Theodor-Heuss-Platz station =

Berlin U-Bahn station

Theodor-Heuss-Platz
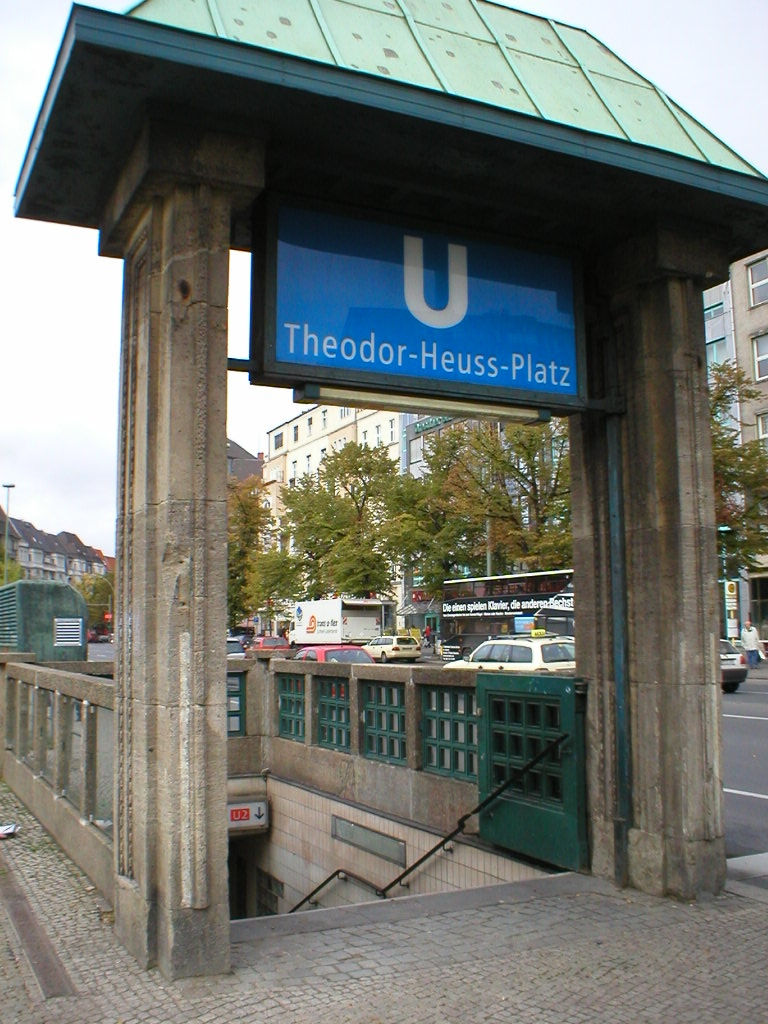
- Eastern entrance to Pankow-bound platform

General information
- Location: Theodor-Heuss-Platz; Westend, Berlin; Germany
- Coordinates: 52°30′35″N 13°16′23″E
- Owner: Berliner Verkehrsbetriebe
- Operator: Berliner Verkehrsbetriebe
- Platforms: 2 side platforms
- Tracks: 2
- Connections: : 104, 218, 349, X34, X49, N2, N42; : M49

Construction
- Structure type: Underground
- Cycle facilities: No
- Accessible: Yes

Other information
- Fare zone: : Berlin B/5656

History
- Opened: 29 March 1908; 118 years ago

Services
| Preceding station | Berlin U-Bahn | Following station |
|---|---|---|
| Neu-Westend towards Ruhleben | U2 | Kaiserdamm towards Pankow |
Location
- Location within Berlin Location within Germany Location within Europe

Theodor-Heuss-Platz is a station on line U2 of the Berlin U-Bahn, located in the Westend district.

== Overview ==
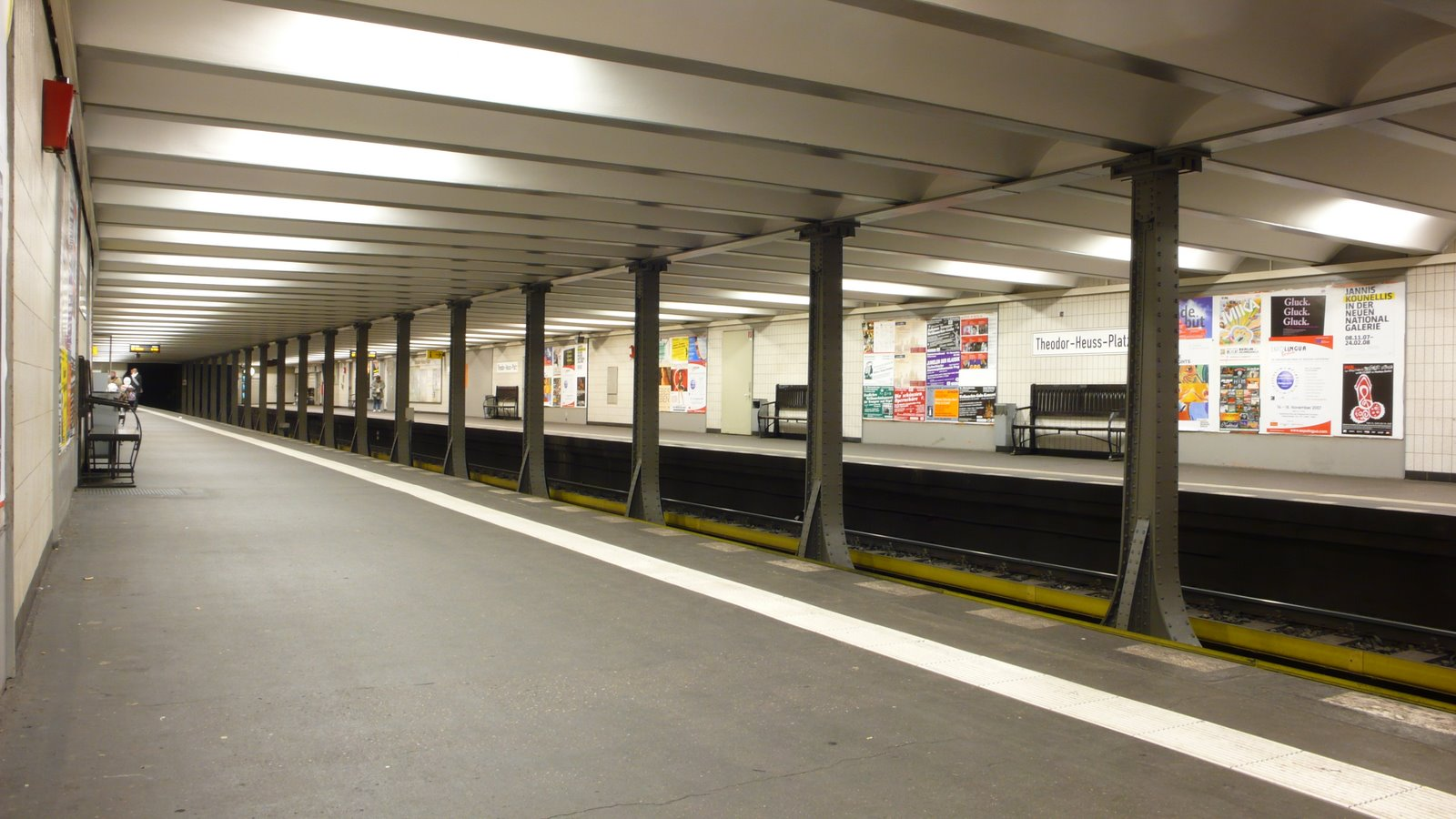
Platforms of the station

When the station first opened on 29 March 1908, it was named Reichskanzlerplatz after the eponymous square laid out between 1904 and 1908, referring to the office of Chancellor of Germany and its inaugural holder, Otto von Bismarck. It had been built according to the plans of Alfred Grenander in the course of the second western extension of the 1902 Stammstrecke route, which originally ran from Warschauer Brücke (now Warschauer Straße) to Knie (now Ernst-Reuter-Platz). At the same time, the Sophie-Charlotte-Platz and Kaiserdamm stations were opened. Two weeks before the opening, Emperor William II had the occasion of a first trip on the new line on 14 March 1908. Reichskanzlerplatz remained the western terminus until the Stadion (now Olympia-Stadion) station opened in 1913.

In the course of the Nazi takeover, the square and the station were renamed Adolf-Hitler-Platz on 21 April 1933 (Hitler had an apartment nearby at the time; the building of Hitlerjungen was here). After the Second World War the Allies reverted the name to Reichskanzlerplatz, which remained until 18 December 1963, when the square and the station were renamed after President Theodor Heuss, who had died six days before.

The station features two platforms, one for each direction, which are not connected; passengers have to exit the station, cross the street, and reenter the station to reach the other platform. Although it suffered only little damage during World War II, the original rich decor, including maiolica tiles from Kadyny, were not preserved.

== Notable places nearby ==
- Theodor-Heuss-Platz
- Haus des Rundfunks
- Messe Berlin
