= Sophie-Charlotte-Platz station =

Berlin U-Bahn station

Sophie-Charlotte-Platz
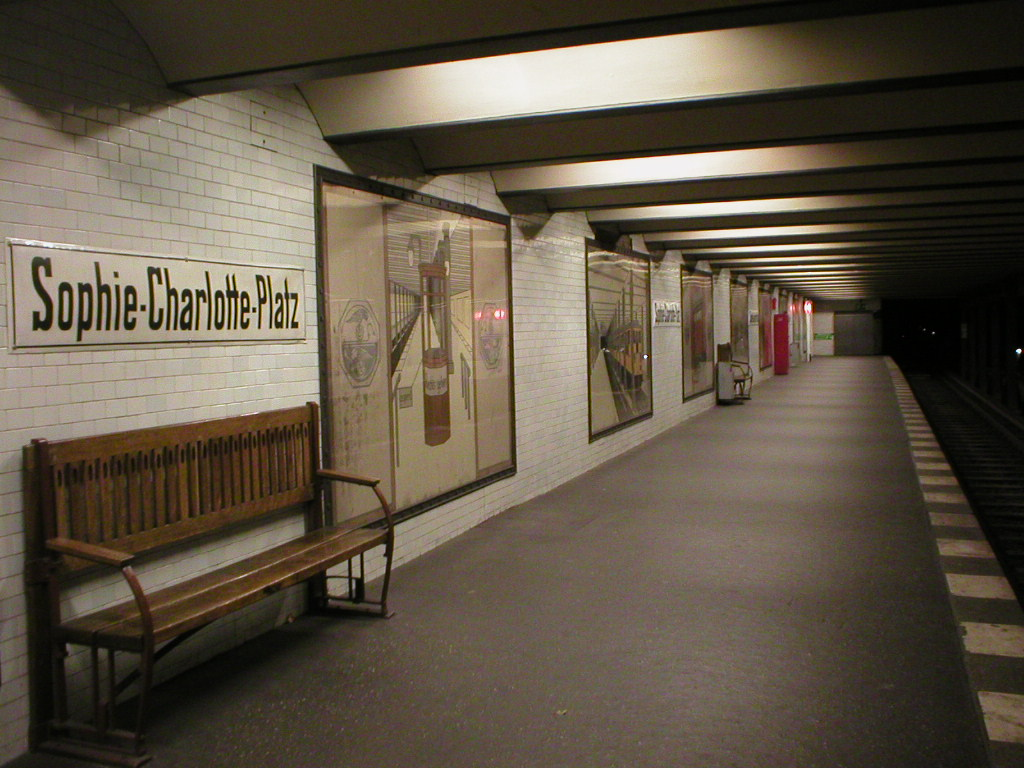
- Station platform

General information
- Location: Kaiserdamm/Suarezstraße; Charlottenburg, Berlin; Germany
- Coordinates: 52°30′39″N 13°17′48″E
- Owner: Berliner Verkehrsbetriebe
- Operator: Berliner Verkehrsbetriebe
- Platforms: 2 side platforms
- Tracks: 2
- Connections: : 309, N2

Construction
- Structure type: Underground
- Cycle facilities: No
- Accessible: Yes (westbound only)

Other information
- Fare zone: : Berlin A/5555

Services
Preceding station	Berlin U-Bahn	Following station
Kaiserdamm towards Ruhleben	U2	Bismarckstraße towards Pankow
Location
- Location within Berlin Location within Germany Location within Europe

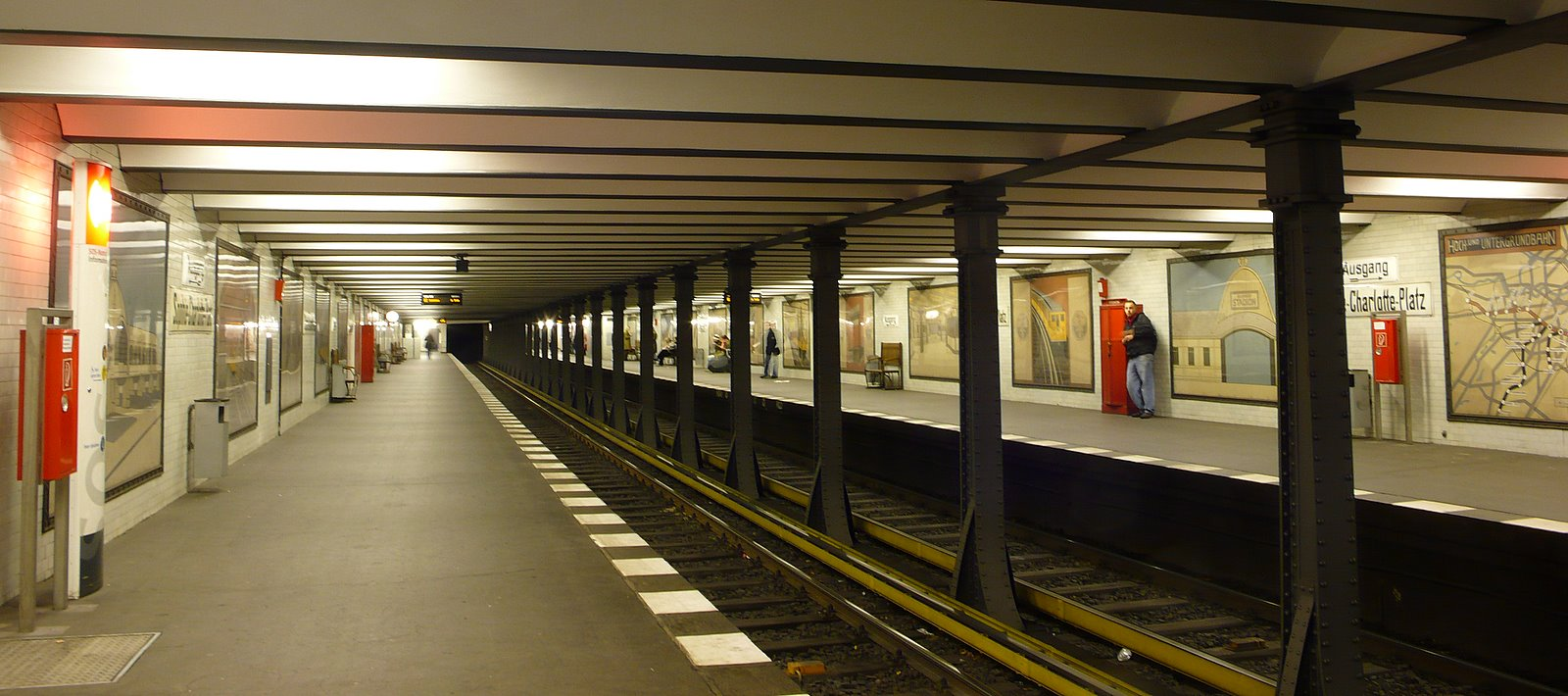
Platform view

Sophie-Charlotte-Platz is a Berlin U-Bahn station on line U2.

== History ==
The station was built by A. Grenander and opened in 1908. In 1935, the windows on top were removed. In 1938, the entrances of the station had to be moved. In 1988, twenty-six large paintings were attached to the walls showing the history of the subway before the First World War.

It was heavily damaged by air raids on 15 February 1944.
