= Messe Berlin =

Exhibition grounds in Berlin, Germany

Coordinates: 52°30′14″N 13°16′24″E

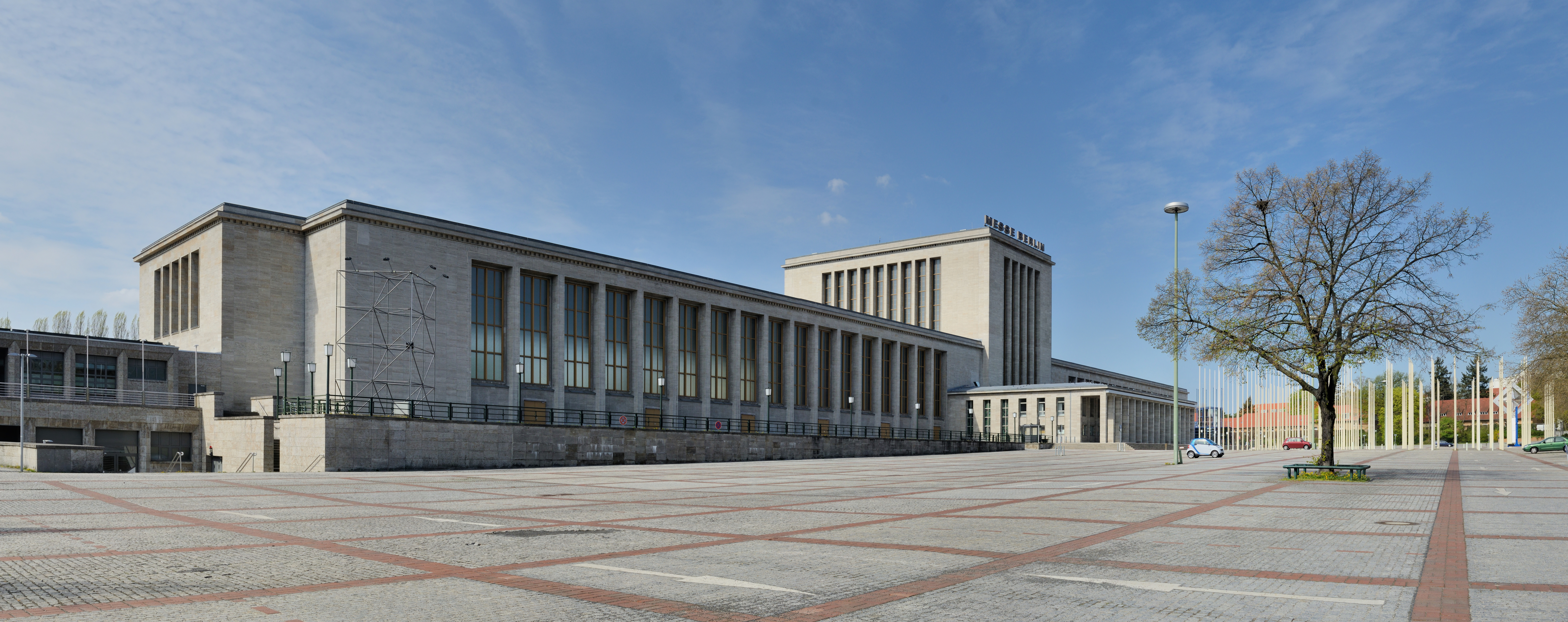
Main building with entry hall at Masurenallee, built by Richard Ermisch

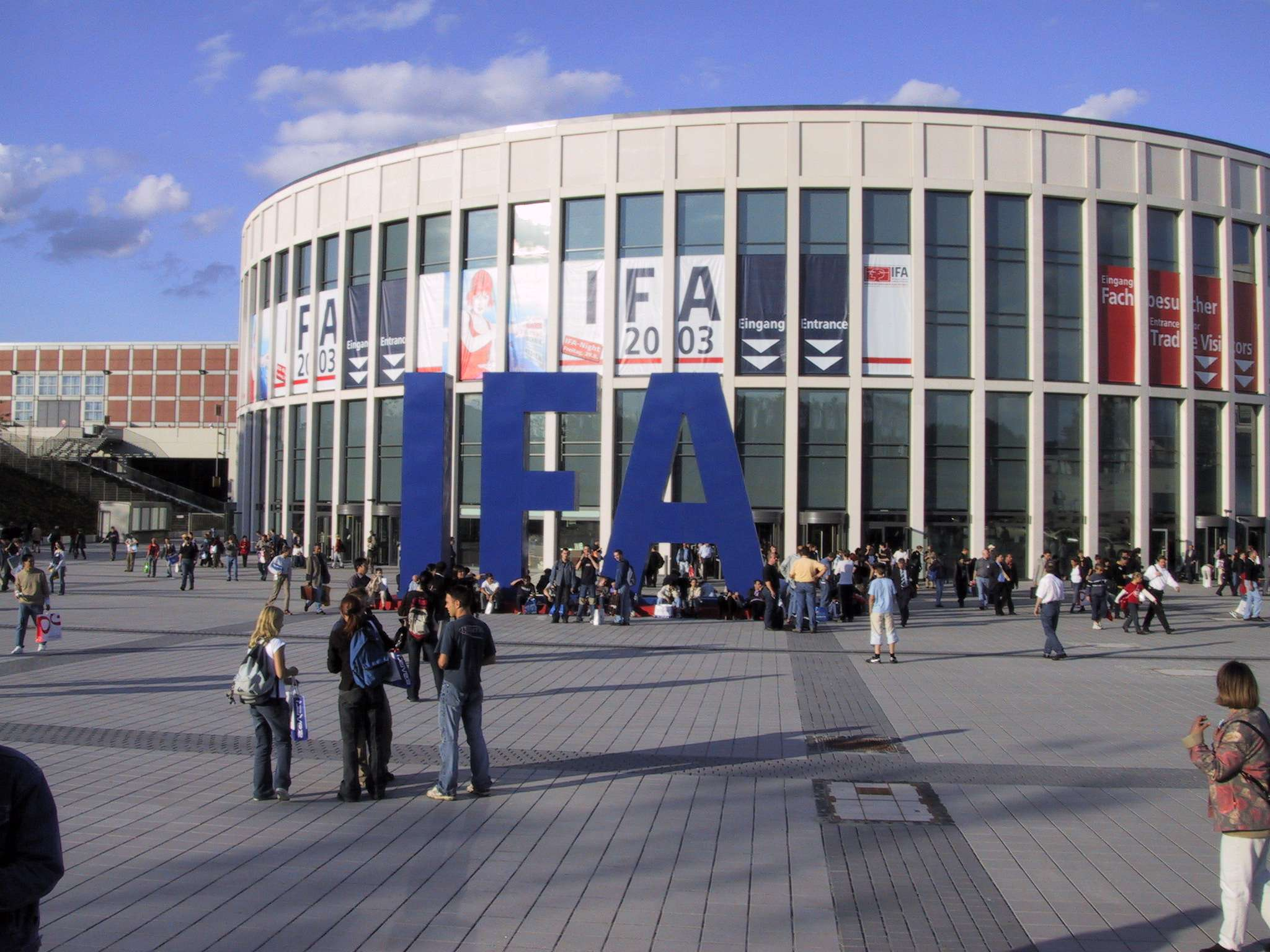
Southern gate during IFA 2003

Messe Berlin (Berlin Messegelände) are exhibition grounds in the Charlottenburg-Wilmersdorf precinct of Berlin, Germany, at Masurenallee opposite the Haus des Rundfunks. Since 2011, they have officially been known as "Berlin ExpoCenter City" and operated by the Messe Berlin GmbH company.

== Overview ==
The premises, built in 1936–37, comprise twenty-six halls covering 160,000 square metres (1,700,000 sq ft) including Funkturm Berlin. The halls are connected via a bridge to the Internationales Congress Centrum Berlin, which closed in 2014 until further notice. To the south is the CityCube Berlin, an exhibition and conference hall that opened in 2014, built on the lands of the former Deutschlandhalle arena, which has replaced the functions of the ICC.

Important trade fairs held here include Internationale Grüne Woche Berlin (Green Week), Internationale Funkausstellung Berlin (IFA), Internationale Tourismus-Börse (ITB), Youth fair YOU, Venus Berlin and InnoTrans.

== History ==
Before the construction for the Messegelände, there was a parade ground on which the Charlottenburg garrison practiced daily. From the end of the 19th century, the route of the Hamburg Stadtbahn connection ran in the area of today's site until it was relocated to the south when the exhibition center was expanded in the 1920s.

The first exhibition hall, completed in 1914 for automobile exhibitions, was located north of today's exhibition center in the parking area between the central bus station and the S-Bahn ring. Because of the First World War, however, it was not opened until the International Motor Show Germany on September 23, 1921. The next day, the first car race took place at the nearby AVUS. Another exhibition hall was built in 1924 according to plans by Jean Krämer and Johann Emil Schaudt, on the site of the bus station. Today's area had been serving as a Berlin trade fair location since 1924, when the wooden "House of the Radio Industry", also called "Funkhalle", west of the Messedamm on the site of today's Hall 14 was opened for the first Great German Radio exhibition. The architect was Heinrich Straumer, who was also responsible for designing the neighboring radio tower.

The name Ausstellungshallen am Kaiserdamm, which was based on the first two halls, only gradually gave way to the current name Ausstellungshallen am Funkturm. In a major fire in 1935, the radio industry building burned down and severely damaged the radio tower. The other two halls north of Masurenallee were destroyed by bombs during World War II. The basic structure of today's exhibition center, designed by architect Richard Ermisch, was built in 1937 along Masurenallee and Messedamm with the striking entrance building on Hammarskjöldplatz. The inner area of the site, known as the "Sommergarten" (summer garden), in the form of a stadium-like green area, was also created during the redesign in the mid-1930s.

From 1954 to 1969, the Federal Assembly elected the German Federal President in the Ostpreußenhalle on the exhibition grounds, today known as Hall 18.
