= St George's Church =

St George's Church, Church of St George, or variants thereof, may refer to various churches dedicated to Saint George:

== Albania ==
- St. George's Church, Dardhë
- St. George's Church, Strum

== Armenia ==
- Saint Gevork Monastery of Mughni, St. George's Monastery of Mughni

== Australia ==
- St George's Anglican Church, Battery Point, Tasmania
- St George's Anglican Church, Beenleigh, Queensland
- St George's Church, Gawler, South Australia; designed by Edward Hamilton
- St George's Presbyterian Church, Geelong, Victoria
- St George's Church, Malvern, Victoria
- St George the Martyr Church and Parish Hall, Queenscliff, Victoria
- St George Macedonian Orthodox Church, Fitzroy, Victoria

== Austria ==
- St. George Church, Vienna

== Belgium ==
- Saint George's Memorial Church, Ypres

== Bosnia and Herzegovina ==
- Church of St. George, Sopotnica

== Bulgaria ==
- Church of Saint George, Sofia
- Church of St George, Kyustendil

== Canada ==
- St. George's Anglican Church (Montreal)
- St. George's (Round) Church (Halifax, Nova Scotia)
- St George's Church (Ottawa)
- St. George's Memorial Church (Oshawa)

== Croatia ==
- Church of St. George, Bobota
- Church of St. George, Grubišno Polje
- Church of St. George, Kneževo
- Church of St. George, Opatovac
- Church of St. George, Tovarnik
- Church of St. George, Varaždin

== Cyprus ==
- Sourp Kevork Church, Limassol (Armenian Apostolic)
- Church of St. George of the Greeks, Famagusta

== Czech Republic ==
- St. George's Convent, Prague
- St. George's Basilica, Prague

== Egypt ==
- Church of St. George (Cairo) (Greek Orthodox)
- Church of Saint George (Sohag), Sohag

== Ethiopia ==
- Church of Saint George, Lalibela
- Yelet Giorgis Church, Bulga

== Finland ==
- St. George's Church, Mariehamn, Mariehamn
- St George's Church, Geta

== France ==
- Église Saint-Georges de Lyon
- Église Saint-Georges de Châtenois
- St. George's Church, Haguenau
- St. George's Church, Sélestat
- St. George's Church, Vesoul
- Royal Memorial Church of St George, Cannes

== Georgia (country) ==
- St. George's Church, one of the churches in Kintsvisi Monastery

== Germany ==
- St. Georg, Aplerbeck
- St. George's Anglican Church, Berlin
- Berger Kirche, dedicated to St. George, in Brechen
- St. George's Church, Cologne
- St. George's Abbey, Isny
- St. George's Collegiate Church, Tübingen, the Stiftskirche
- St. Georg's Church, Eisenach

== Greece ==
- St. George's Church in the Old Fortress, Corfu
- St. George's Church (Rotunda), part of the Arch of Galerius and Rotunda, Thessaloniki

== India ==
- St. George Orthodox Church, Cheppad
- St. George Basilica, Angamaly
- St. George Orthodox Church, Puthuppally
- Kottoor Pally, Kolenchery
- St. George's Church, Chandanapally
- St. George's Church, Hyderabad
- St. George's Forane Church, Edappally, Kerala, South India

== Iran ==
- St. George Church, Salmas
- St. George Church, New Julfa, Isfahan
- St. George Church, Tehran

== Iraq ==
- St. George's Church, Ankawa
- St. George Church, Baghdad

== Ireland ==
- Old Church of St George, Hill Street Dublin
- St. George's Church, Dublin

== Isle of Man ==
- St George's Church, Isle of Man

== Israel and the Palestinian territories ==
- Church of Saint George and Mosque of Al-Khadr (Greek Orthodox and Sunni Muslim)
- St. George's Monastery, Al-Khader near Bethlehem, West Bank (Greek Orthodox)
- Church of Saint George, Abu Snan, Galilee (Greek Orthodox)
- Saint George Cathedral, Acre (Greek Orthodox)
- Church of Saint George, I'billin, Galilee (Greek Orthodox)
- Church of Saint George, Jaffa (Greek Orthodox)
- St. George's Monastery, Wadi Qelt near Jericho, West Bank (Greek Orthodox)

== Italy ==
- San Giorgio fuori le mura
- San Giorgio in Velabro

== Kazakhstan ==
- St George's Church, Kokshetau

== Lebanon ==
- Maronite Cathedral of Saint George, Beirut
- Saint George Greek Orthodox Cathedral
- Cathedral of Saint George, Ehden
- Saint George Church, Baabdat
- Saint George Church, Edde
- Church of Saint George, Faitroun, Keserwan District, Mount Lebanon
- Saint Georges, Saraaine El Tahta in Bekaa Valley
- Saint George Church, Zouk Mikael, Keserwan District, Mount Lebanon
- Triple Church of St. George, Tabarja
- Saint George, Bteghrine

== Lithuania ==
- Church of St. George, Vilnius

== Malta ==
- St George's Chapel, Birżebbuġa
- Parish Church of St George, Qormi
- St George's Basilica, Victoria
- Church of St George, Valletta

== Malaysia ==
- St. George's Church, Penang

== North Macedonia ==
- Church of St. George, Staro Nagoričane

== Norway ==
- St George's Church, Bergen, St. Jørgen's hospitalkirken in Bergen

== Palestine ==
- St. George's Monastery, Al-Khader, al-Khader, Bethlehem
- Burqin Church or St. George's Church, Burqin, Jenin
- St. George's Cathedral, Jerusalem
- St. George's Monastery in Wadi Qelt, Jericho
- St. George's Greek Orthodox Church, Jifna, Ramallah
- St. George's Greek Orthodox Church, Birzeit, Ramallah
- St George church ruins, Taybeh, Ramallah
- St. George's Greek Orthodox Church, Tulkarm

== Poland ==
- Saint George church (Tarnogród)

== Portugal ==
- St. George's Church, Lisbon, the English-speaking Anglican congregation in Lisbon

== Romania ==
- New St. George Church, Bucharest
- Old St. George Church, Bucharest
- St. George's Church, Caransebeș
- North St. George Church, Focșani
- Armenian Church, Focșani
- South Cemetery Church, Focșani
- St. George's Church, Mangalia
- St. George's Church, Sfântu Gheorghe

== Russia ==
- St. George's Church, Staraya Ladoga

== Serbia ==
- Saint George's Cathedral (Novi Sad)
- St. George's Church, Bečej
- Church of St. George, Banovo Brdo
- Church of St. George, Lukovo
- St. George's Church, Oplenac
- Church of St. George, Sombor
- Church of St. George, Staro Nagoričane

== Singapore ==
- Saint George's Church, Singapore

== Syria ==
- Saint George's Monastery, Homs

== Turkey ==
- St. George's Church, Diyarbakır
- St. George's Cathedral, Istanbul
- Catholic church of Saint George, Istanbul

== Ukraine ==
- St. George's Church, Drohobych
- Saint George church, Kasperivtsi

== United Kingdom ==
=== England ===
==== Bedfordshire ====
- St George's Church, Edworth

==== Berkshire ====
- St George's Chapel, Windsor Castle

==== Bristol ====
- St George's Church, Brandon Hill

==== Cambridgeshire ====
- St George's Church, Little Thetford

==== Cheshire ====
- St George's Church, Macclesfield
- St George's Church, Poynton

==== Cumbria ====
- St George's Church, Barrow-in-Furness
- Church of Holy Trinity and St George, Kendal
- St George's Church, Kendal
- St George's Church, Millom

==== Devon ====
- St George's Church, Morebath
- St George's Church, Tiverton

==== Dorset ====
- St George's Church, Fordington
- St George's Church, Langham
- St George's Church, Oakdale
- St George's Church, Portland

==== East Sussex ====
- St George's Church, Brighton
- St George's Church, Polegate

==== Gloucestershire ====
- St George's Church, Cam
- St George's Church, Gloucester

==== Greater Manchester ====
- St George's Church, Altrincham
- St George's Church, Carrington
- St George's Church, Heaviley
- St George's Church, Hyde
- Church of St George, Chester Road, Hulme
- St George's Church, Stalybridge

==== Isle of Wight ====
- St George's Church, Arreton

==== Kent ====
- St George's Chapel, Chatham
- St George's Church, Gravesend, burial site of Pocahontas

==== Lancashire ====
- St George's Church, Chorley
- Church of St George the Martyr, Preston

==== Lincolnshire ====
- St George's Church, Goltho
- St George's Church, Lincoln
- St George's Church, Stamford

==== London ====
- St George's RAF Chapel, Biggin Hill
- St George's Church, Beckenham
- St George's, Bloomsbury
- St George's Church, Hanworth
- St George's, Hanover Square
- St George in the East
- St George the Martyr, Holborn
- St George the Martyr, Southwark
- St George's Cathedral, London
- St George's Cathedral, Southwark
- St George's Interdenominational Chapel, Heathrow Airport

==== Merseyside ====
- St George's Church, Everton
- St George's Church on the site of the Liverpool Castle
- St George's Church, Thornton Hough

==== Norfolk ====
- St George's Church, Colegate, Norwich
- St George's Church, Tombland, Norwich
- St George's Church, Shimpling

==== North Tyneside ====
- St George's, Cullercoats

==== Nottinghamshire ====
- St George's Church, Barton in Fabis
- St George in the Meadows, Nottingham

==== Somerset ====
- St George's Church, Beckington
- St George's Church, Bicknoller
- Priory Church of St George, Dunster
- Church of St George, Easton in Gordano
- St George's Church, Fons George
- St George's Church, Hinton St George

==== Surrey ====
- St George's Church, Esher

==== West Midlands ====
- St George's Church, Edgbaston

==== West Sussex ====
- St George's Church, Eastergate
- St George's Church, West Grinstead
- St George's Church, Worthing

==== Wiltshire ====
- St George's Church, Orcheston

==== Worcestershire ====
- St George's Church, Worcester

==== Yorkshire ====
- Minster and Parish Church of St George, Doncaster, South Yorkshire
- St George's Church, Leeds, West Yorkshire
- St George's Church, Portobello, Sheffield
- St George's Roman Catholic Church, York

=== Northern Ireland ===
- St George's Church, Belfast

=== Scotland ===
- St Andrew's and St George's West Church, Edinburgh
- St George's Tron Church, Glasgow
- St Paul's and St George's Church, Edinburgh

== United States ==
- St. George's Catholic Church (Chicago), a defunct Lithuanian-Catholic church
- St. George's Church (Leadville, Colorado), in National Historic Landmark Leadville Historic District
- St. George's Chapel, Lewes, Delaware
- Saint Georges, Delaware
  - North Saint Georges Historic District
  - St. Georges Presbyterian Church
- St. George Episcopal Church (Jacksonville), Florida
- Greek Orthodox Church of St. George (Des Moines, Iowa)
- St. George's Episcopal Church (Le Mars, Iowa)
- St. George's Roman Catholic Church (Louisville), Kentucky
- St. George's Episcopal Church (Austin, Nevada)
- St. George's Anglican Church (Helmetta, New Jersey), NHRP district contributing property
- St. George & St. Shenouda Coptic Orthodox Church (Jersey City, New Jersey)
- St. George Coptic Orthodox Church (Brooklyn), New York
- St. George's Church (Queens), New York
- St. George's Episcopal Church (Hempstead, New York)
- St. George's Episcopal Church (Manhattan), New York
- Saint George Ukrainian Catholic Church, Manhattan, New York
- St. George's Catholic Church (Cincinnati, Ohio)
- St. George Coptic Orthodox Church (Philadelphia), Norristown, Pennsylvania
- St. George's United Methodist Church (Philadelphia), Pennsylvania
- St. George Church (Pittsburgh), Pennsylvania
- St. George's Catholic Church (Bakersfield, Vermont)
- St. George's Church (Pungoteague, Virginia), Accomack County, Virginia
- St. George's Episcopal Church (Fredericksburg, Virginia)

== See also ==
- Saint George
- St. George and St. Adalbert Church, Sillamäe, Estonia
- St. George's Anglican Church (disambiguation)
- St. George Orthodox Church (disambiguation)
- St. George's Cathedral (disambiguation)
