= St. George's Protestant Episcopal Church =

St. George's Protestant Episcopal Church may refer to:

- St. George's Protestant Episcopal Church (Brooklyn), New York City
- St. George's Episcopal Church (Valley Lee, Maryland)

== See also ==
- St. George's Episcopal Church (disambiguation)
- St George's Church (disambiguation)
