= St. George's Episcopal Church =

St. George's Episcopal Church, or variants thereof, may refer to:

- St. George Episcopal Church (Jacksonville), Florida
- St. George's Episcopal Church (Le Mars, Iowa)
- St. George's Episcopal Church (Valley Lee, Maryland)
- St. George's Anglican Church (Helmetta, New Jersey), known until 2010 as St. George's Episcopal Church
- St. George's Protestant Episcopal Church (Brooklyn)
- St. George's Episcopal Church (Hempstead, New York)
- St. George's Episcopal Church (Manhattan)
- St. George's Episcopal Church (Fredericksburg, Virginia)
- St. George's Episcopal Church (Griffin, Georgia), listed on the NRHP in Georgia
- St. George's Episcopal Church (Austin, Nevada)

== See also ==
- St George's Church (disambiguation)
