= Kneževo, Croatia =

Kneževo
- Village (Selo)
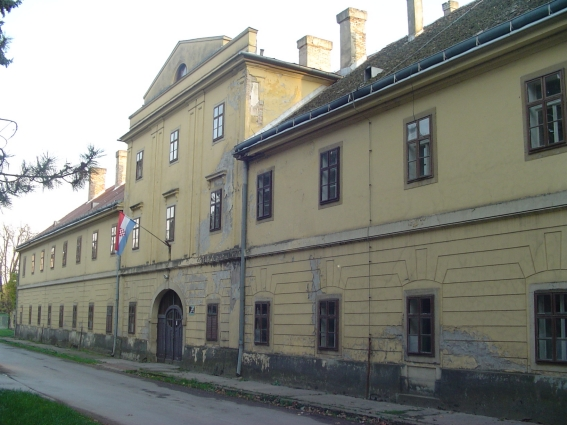
- Castle in Kneževo

- Location within Croatia
- Country: Croatia
- County: Osijek-Baranja
- Municipality: Popovac

Area
  - Total: 19.0 km^{2} (7.3 sq mi)

Population (2021)
  - Total: 485
  - Density: 25.5/km^{2} (66.1/sq mi)

Kneževo (Hungarian: Főherceglak, Serbian Cyrillic: Кнежево) is a settlement in the region of Baranja, Croatia. Administratively, it is located in the Popovac municipality within the Osijek-Baranja County. Population is 970 people.

== Etymology ==
Name comes from Croatian word "knez", meaning "prince". Alternative Croatian names for this settlement were: Državno Dobro Belje and Kneževi. In Hungarian, name used for it is Főherceglak.

== History ==
It was mentioned first in 1214 and was named Lak. Modern settlement was founded in the end of 18th and first part of the 19th century and was named Herceg Lak. School was opened in 1820. In 1905, settlement had 605 inhabitants. After World War I, it was named Kneževo.

== Demographics ==
Ethnic groups in Kneževo (1991 census):

- Croats (29.68%)
- Serbs (29.19%)
- Yugoslavs (20.59%)
- Hungarians (6.39%)
- others (14.13%)

== See also ==
- Church of St. George, Kneževo
- Osijek-Baranja county
- Baranja

== Literature ==
- Obad Šćitaroci, Mladen; Bojanić Obad Šćitaroci, Bojana; Dundović, Boris (2013). "Manors and Gardens in Northern Croatia in the Age of Historicism" (PDF). Centropa. pp. 175–186. ISSN 1532-5563. Archived from the original (PDF) on 2025-05-05.
