= Drohobych Museum =

Museum in Drohobych, Ukraine

Coordinates: 49.3500°N 23.5000°E

The Drohobych Museum
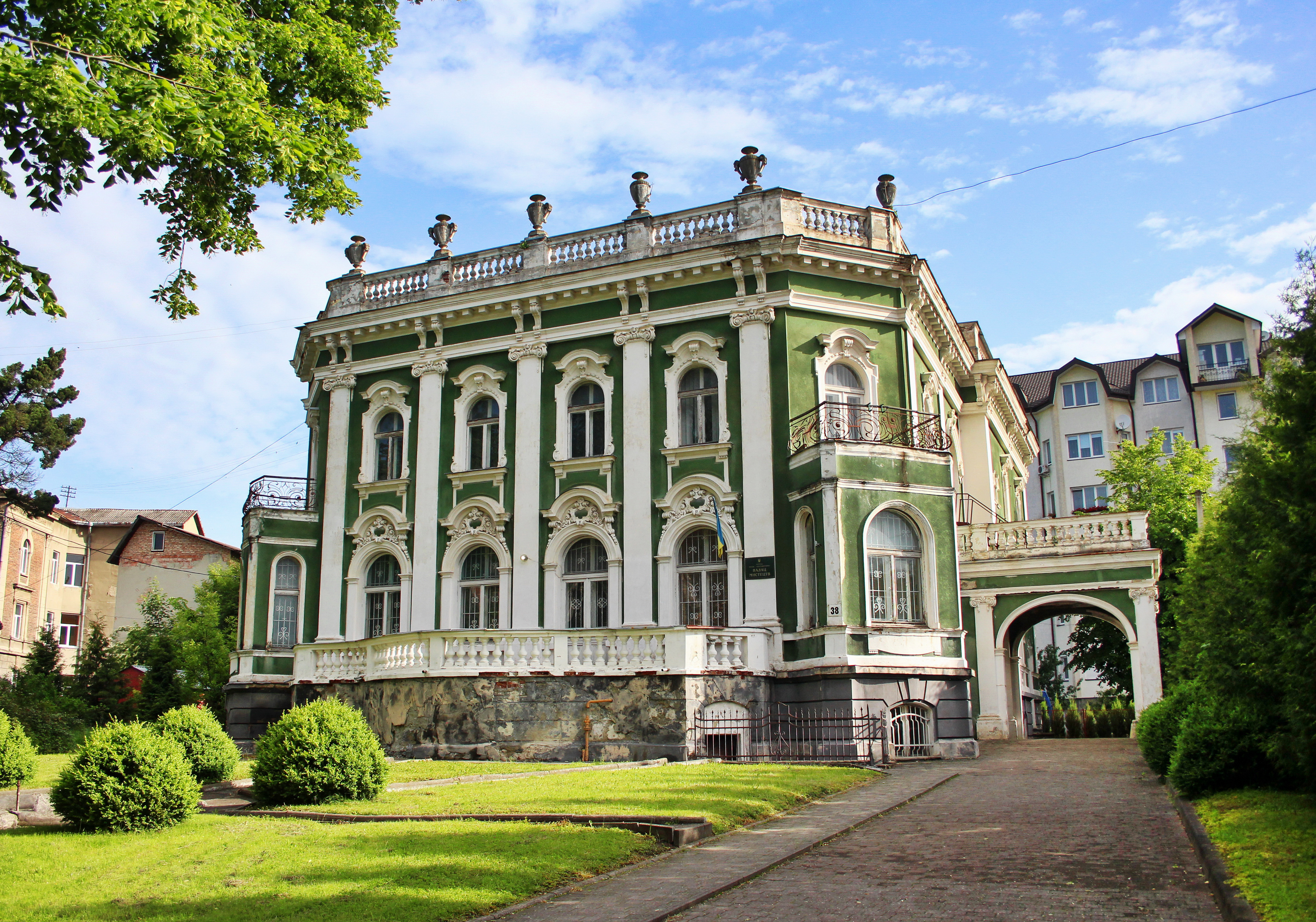
- Bianka Villa, the site of the museum's exposition
- Established: May 1940
- Location: Taras Shevchenko Street, 38 Drohobych, Ukraine
- Director: Alla Hladun

Museum Drohobychchyna (officially known as Drohobych Museum of Local Studies or The Drohobych Museum of Local Lore, commonly called the Drohobych Museum) is a museum in Drohobych, Ukraine, is a major cultural and educational centre of Lviv Oblast.

It was founded in 1940 as a Regional History and Local Lore Museum. In the period of the temporary occupation of the town by Nazi Germany its riches were heavily plundered. But already on the fourth day after the literation of the town by Soviet forces, on October 9, 1944, the museum resumed its activity. After the territory of the Drohobych Oblast was joined with the Lviv Oblast in May 1959, it proceeded to function as the Regional Museum of Local Studies.

Among the materials of the exhibition there are archeological finds, articles of Drohobych artisans, implements of production and articles of peasants' everyday life; the museum presents numerous documents elucidating different periods in the country's history, printed books published in Ukraine before the 18th century, a collection of the 17th–19th century majolica, works of local and West European fine arts, etc. While getting acquainted with St. George's and Holy Cross churches, remarkable monuments of wooden folk architecture of Galician school of the late 15th early 16th centuries, the visitor can view specimens of medieval icon-painting and unique wall paintings of the interiors carried out in Renaissance style.

Of special value are relics associated with the names of outstanding country-men. Yuriy Kotermack (с. 1450–1494), a Ukrainian scholar, doctor of medicine and philosophy, lecturer and then rector of the Bologna University, professor of the Krakow University, who was born in Drohobych, is known under the pen-name of Yuriy Drohobych. He is the author of the country's first printed book "Judicium Prognosticon..." (1483). On display are Yuriy Drohobych's portrait by I. Marchuk, painter, a photocopy of his astronomic treatise, and xerocopy of his lecture schedule in the Bologna University.

== See also ==
- St. George's Church, Drohobych
- Church of the Holy Cross, Drohobych
