= St. George's Church, Diyarbakır =

Coordinates: 37°54′57.5″N 40°14′32.8″E

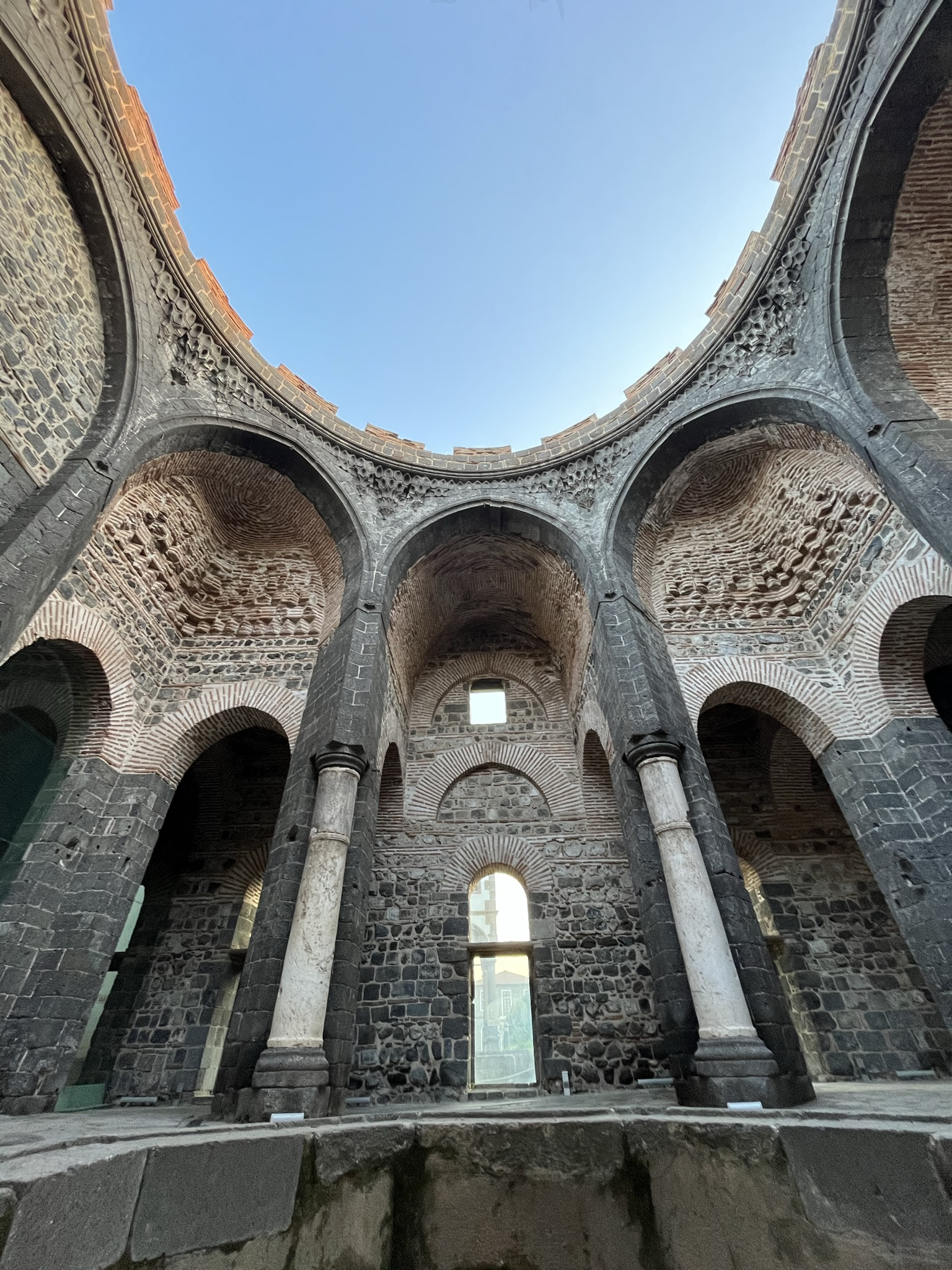
View of the western chamber of the building in 2021

St. George's Church is a historic monument in Diyarbakır, Turkey. It is located in the citadel (Turkish: Iç Kale) of the Sur district, the old walled city.

== History ==
The exact provenance of the building and its original function is unclear. Various scholars have proposed different theories about its history. Joseph Strzygowski claims that it was a Nestorian church built in the 4th century, restored in 518 by Anastasius, and converted into a mosque in the 14th or 15th century. Orhan Cezmi Tuncer argues that the church was not converted into a mosque but rather into a bathhouse, at which time the western section of the building was added for this purpose. Gertrude Bell believed that the walls are a mix of reused materials from different periods but that its dome was a Muslim construction. Thomas Alan Sinclair and Elif Keser Kayaalp have suggested that the building may have instead been part of an Artuqid or early Islamic palace.

In its later history, the building was used as a storage space and then as a prison. It underwent a restoration in 2008. As of 2021, it was undergoing another restoration with the intention of converting it into an exhibition hall associated with the Museum of Diyarbakır. The building sustained minor damage in the 2023 Turkey–Syria earthquake.

== Architecture ==
The building, made of brick and stone, consists of two large rectangular chambers each covered (or formerly covered) by an oval dome. The eastern part of the building is consistent with its possible origin as a church, while the western part of the building may have been a later addition during the Islamic period. Some scholars have noted resemblances between the building's domed structure and that of Sasanian palaces, such as the Sarvestan Palace and the structures at Firuzabad, as well as similarities with eastern churches of the Sasanian era in Ctesiphon and al-Hirah.

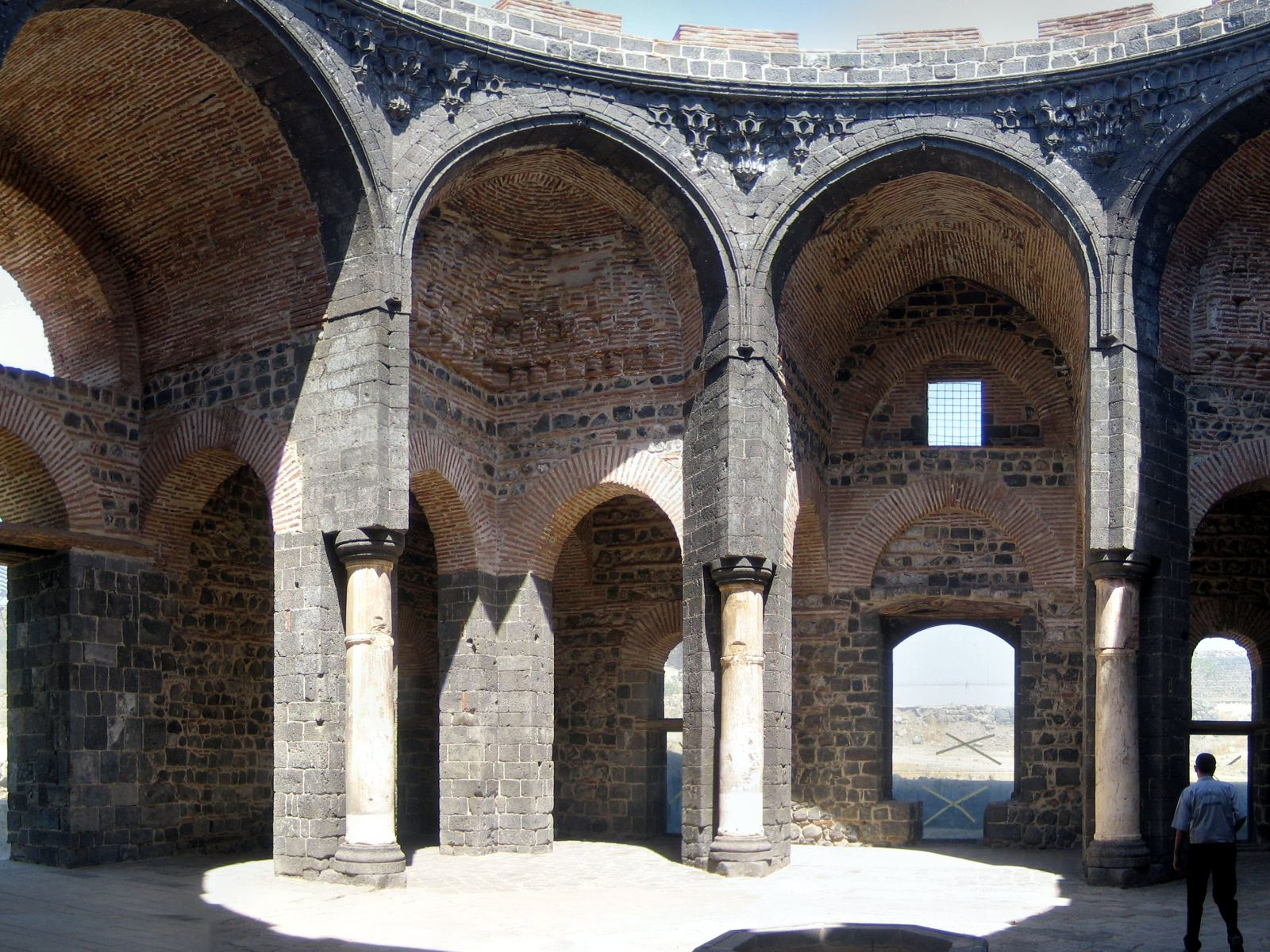
Supporting piers and arches in the western chamber, with muqarnas decoration visible along the upper parts

The western chamber is more spacious than the eastern one and its dome was higher. The dome had partially collapsed by the early 20th century. It was supported by eight piers, still standing today, between which are high arches. The four arches aligned with the dome's two central axes each form part of an iwan, while the arches at the four diagonal corners of the dome contain squinches. Some muqarnas masonry is found in the squinches, while the shallow pendentives between the eight arches are decorated with muqarnas stonework similar to that found on the Artuqid towers of the city walls. Behind these arches, and running around the chamber, is a corridor covered by oval vaults. This corridor once surrounded the chamber on all four sides, but its eastern wing has since been walled off to form a separate narrow chamber between the main western and eastern chambers. The former dome, the squinches, and most of the vaults are built in brick, while the supporting arches are made in stone.

The eastern chamber has a longer east-to-west axis and is divided into three parts: the main aisle, covered by the central dome, and two much smaller side aisles, running behind the supporting piers of the central dome and covered by transverse vaults and arches. The supporting piers on the north and south sides of the oval dome incorporate large columns. In the corners, the dome is once again supported by squinches with muqarnas decoration. At the east end of the chamber is a rectangular vaulted room with large windows. This room is aligned with the central axis of the main dome and projects outward from the main chamber. Two other smaller vaulted rooms also open to the south of this.
