= North St. George Church, Focșani =

Heritage site in Vrancea County, Romania

Coordinates: 45°42′12″N 27°10′58″E

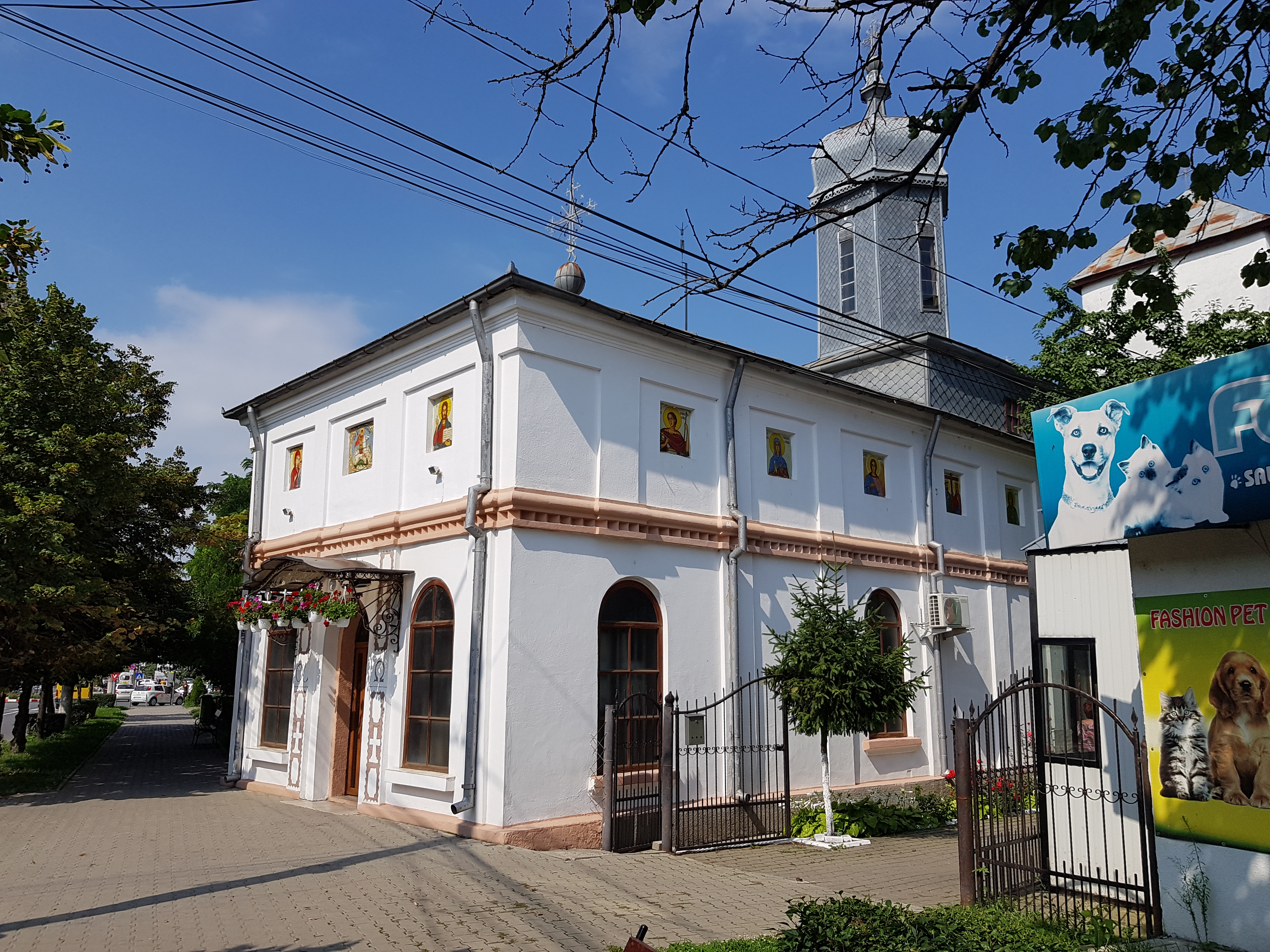
North St. George Church

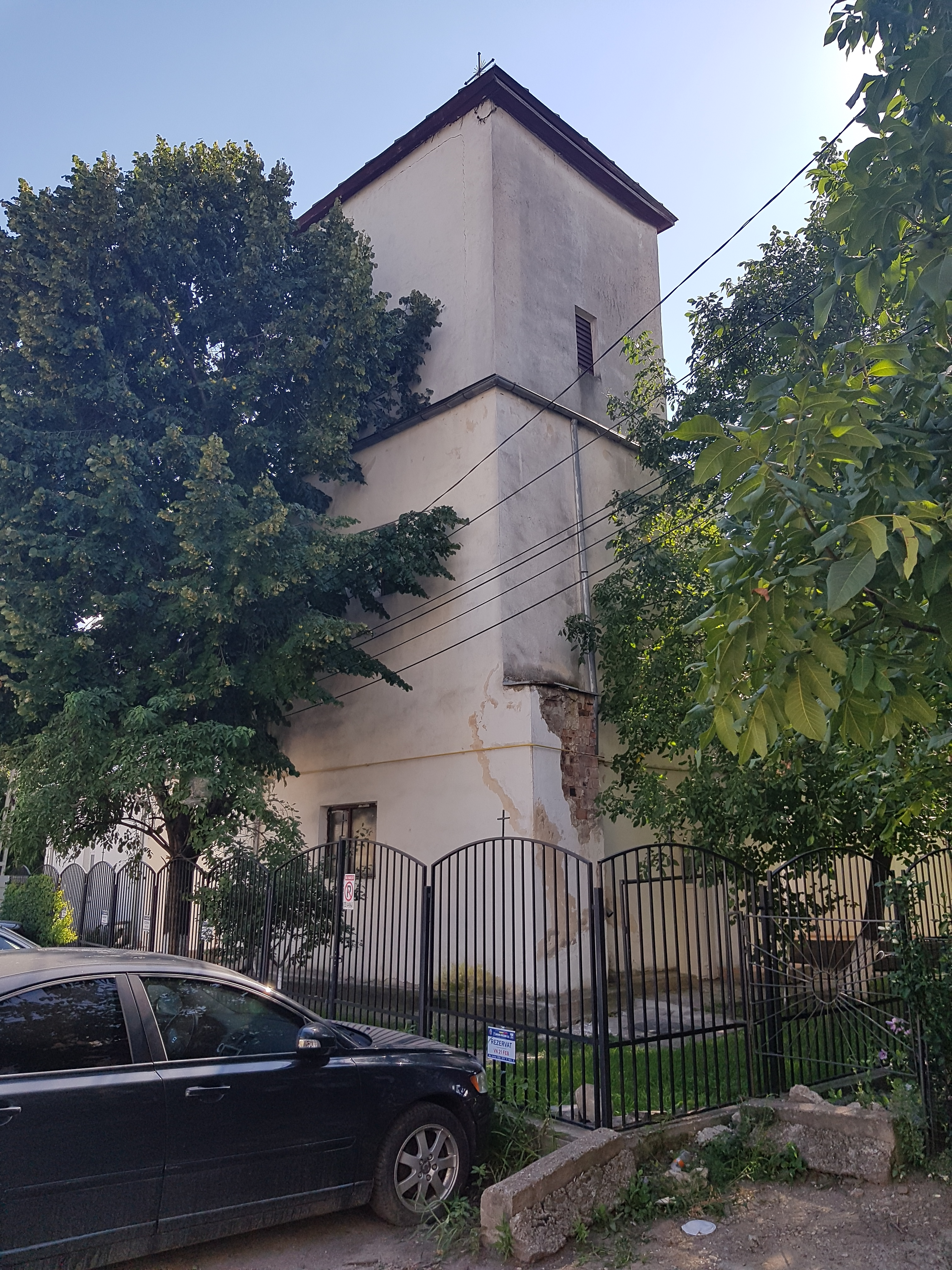
Bell tower

North St. George Church (Romanian: Biserica Sfântul Gheorghe - Nord) is a Romanian Orthodox church located at 20 Independenței Boulevard in Focșani, Romania. It is dedicated to Saint George.

The church was founded by the inhabitants of the Ocol quarter. A stone inscription on the floor indicates an 1819 construction date. The detached bell tower also served as an observation post for fires.

The ship-shaped church has a closed porch, a nave and altar. The foundation is stone, the walls of masonry. The porch and attic are linked by a wooden staircase on the north side. The nave is topped by a spire painted with Christ Pantocrator; it is cylindrical on the exterior, polygonal on the interior, with windows on each face. The facade is divided into two horizontal registers by a row of bricks. Each register is further divided into rectangular sections by columns. On the lower side, the columns enclose windows; on the upper, rectangular niches painted with saints’ portraits. The entry is protected by a glass and cast iron extension.

The church is listed as a historic monument by Romania's Ministry of Culture and Religious Affairs, as is the 1839 tower.
