= St. George's Church, Mangalia =

Heritage site in Constanța County, Romania

Coordinates: 43°48′44.3″N 28°34′55.6″E

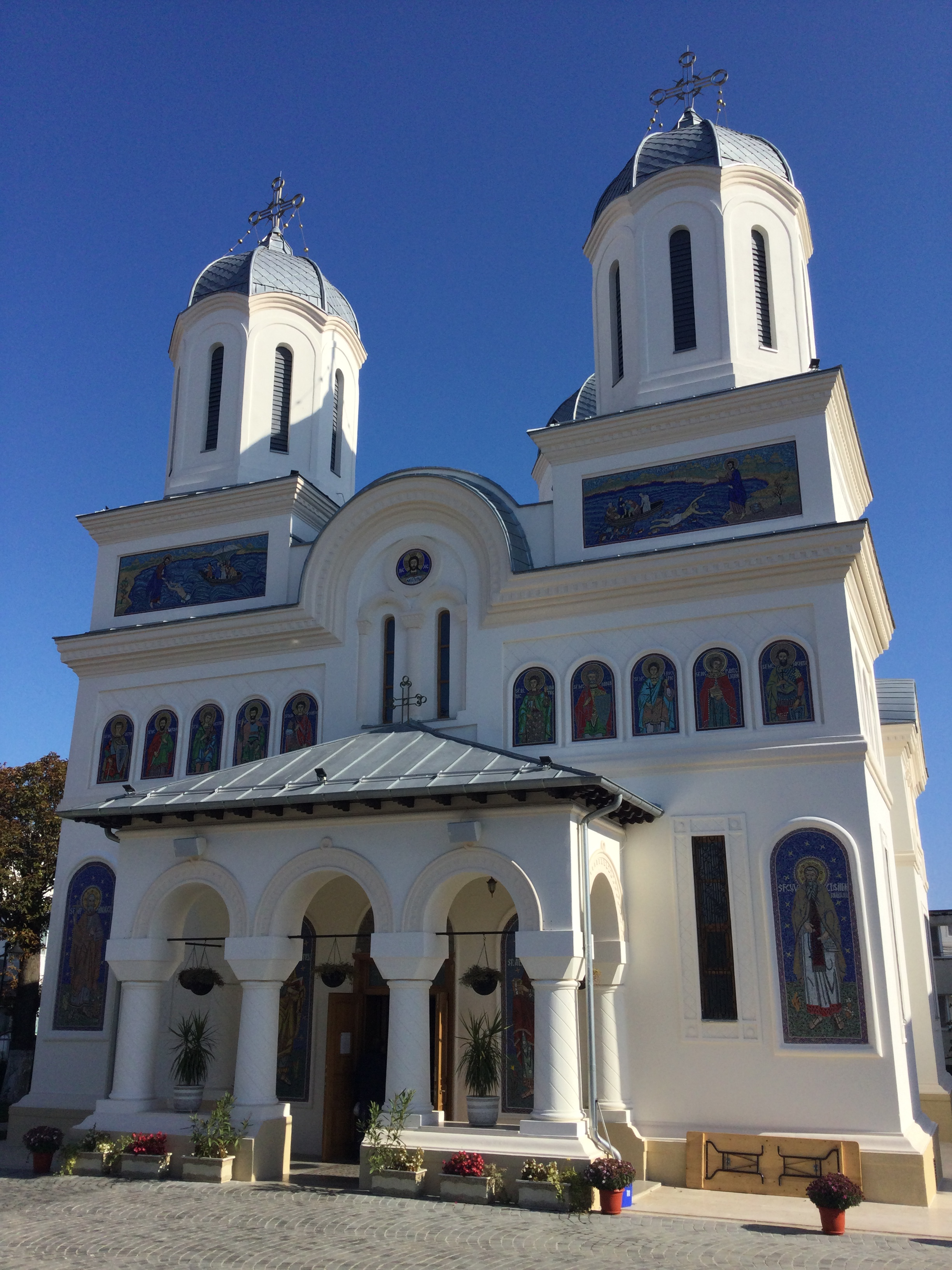
St. George's Church

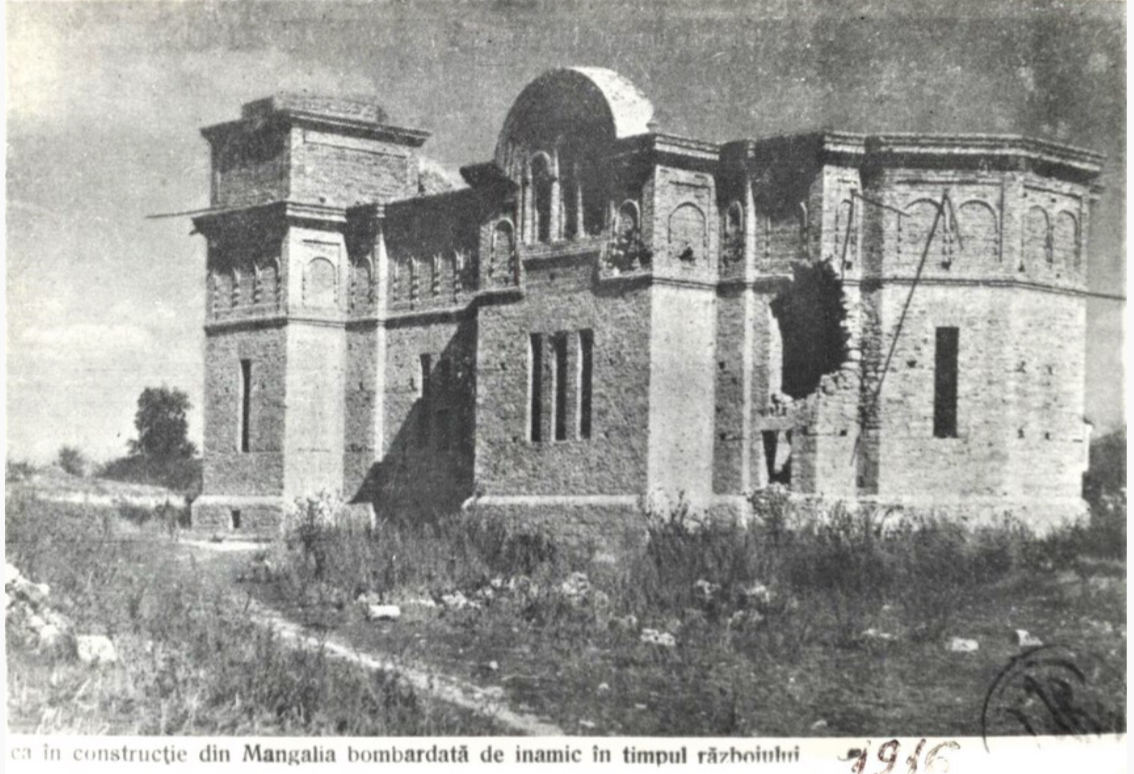
The partly completed church after bombardment in 1916, during World War I

St. George's Church (Romanian: Biserica Sfântul Gheorghe) is a Romanian Orthodox church located at 7 Mihai Viteazul Street, Mangalia, Romania. It is dedicated to Saint George.

The church was begun in September 1915, with contributions from local citizens. The structure was nearly complete the following August, but was severely damaged by naval bombardment carried out by the Central Powers after Romania entered World War I. The head builder was killed, falling beneath the walls.

Work was resumed in 1926, and the church was dedicated in June 1929. Among those present for the ceremony were Princess Helen, Nicolae Iorga, Aurel Vlad and Gherontie Nicolau, the Bishop of Constanța. The painting was executed in fresco from 1964 to 1968, while the exterior mosaic medallions date to 1980–1982.

The church is listed as a historic monument by Romania's Ministry of Culture and Religious Affairs. Starting in 2019, St. George's Church was restored with 11 million lei in funds from the European Union; after completion of the work, the church was re-sanctified on September 12, 2021.
