= St. George's Church, Drohobych =

Drohobych-Tserkva of Saint George
UNESCO World Heritage Site
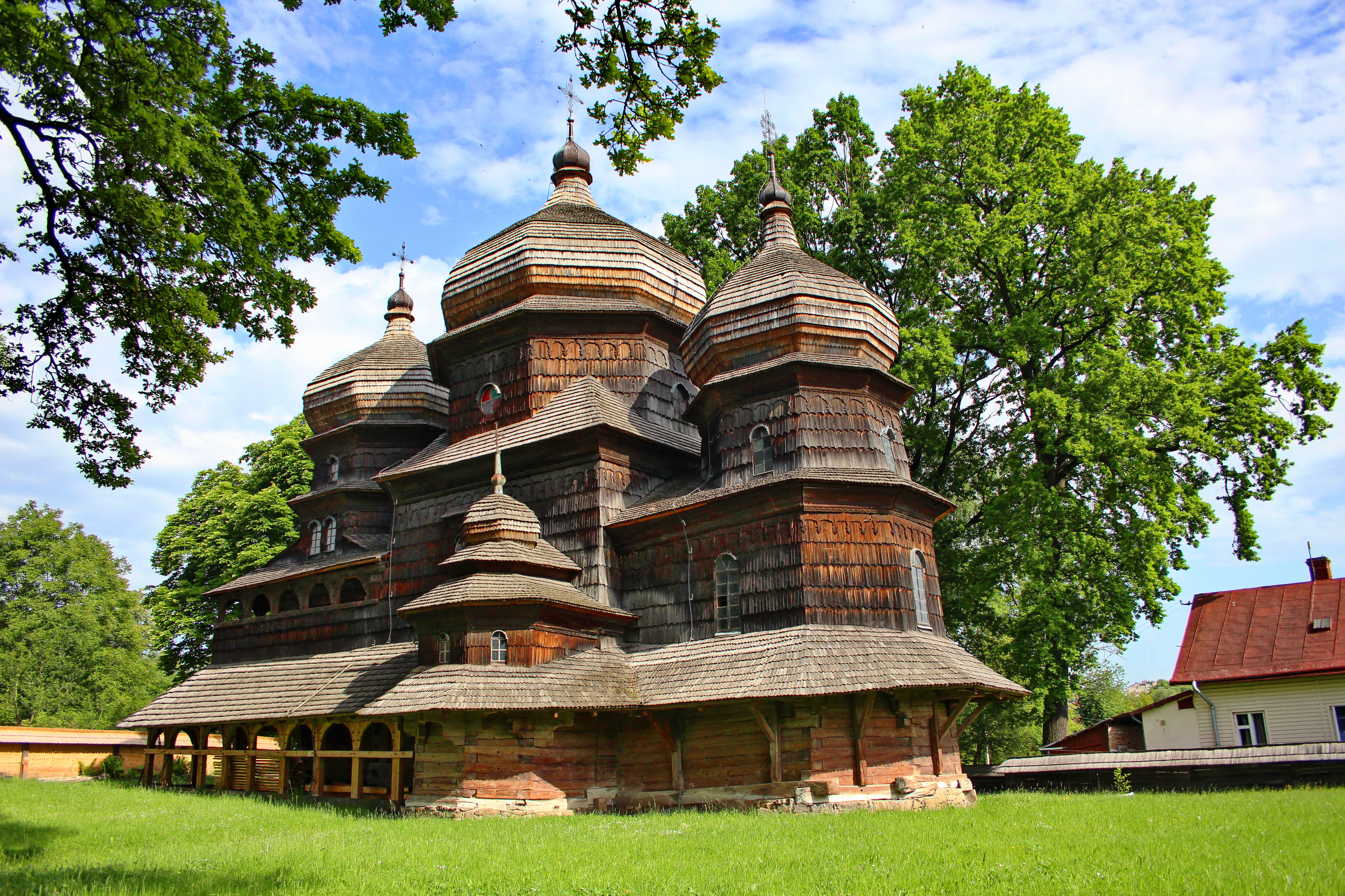

- Location within Lviv Oblast Location within Ukraine
- Location: Drohobych, Lviv Oblast, Ukraine
- Part of: Wooden Tserkvas of the Carpathian Region in Poland and Ukraine
- Criteria: (iii), (iv)
- Reference: 1424-003
- Inscription: 2013 (37th Session)
- Area: 0.18 ha (0.44 acres)
- Buffer zone: 1.06 ha (2.6 acres)
- Coordinates: 49°21′05″N 23°29′48″E

St. George's Church
- Церква Святого Юра
- St. George's Church
- Denomination: Catholic Church

History
- Founded: 1656
- Dedication: Saint George

Immovable Monument of National Significance of Ukraine
- Official name: Юр'ївська церква та дзвіниця (дер.) (St. George's Church and bell tower (wooden))
- Type: Architecture
- Reference no.: 130048

St. George's Church in Drohobych is one of the oldest and best preserved timber churches of Galicia. The church is a monument of Galician wooden architecture of the late 15th – early 16th centuries, one of the best preserved and one of the best monuments of ancient Ukrainian sacral architecture. Built in the 15th century, it has been rebuilt several times and given the final architectural forms by the talented Ukrainian architect Hryhoriy Tesla from Drohobych. The church is part of the wooden architecture department of the Museum of Drohobych region.

The church consists of three parts. The central block is square in plan and comprises the nave. Two other blocks contain the double apse and the narthex. Between 1678 and 1711, the church was renovated: the interior was frescoed, the octagonal structures built up, and a new belfry appeared.

It is one of the 16 churches that comprise a World Heritage Site named the Wooden Tserkvas of the Carpathian Region in Poland and Ukraine.

== Gallery ==
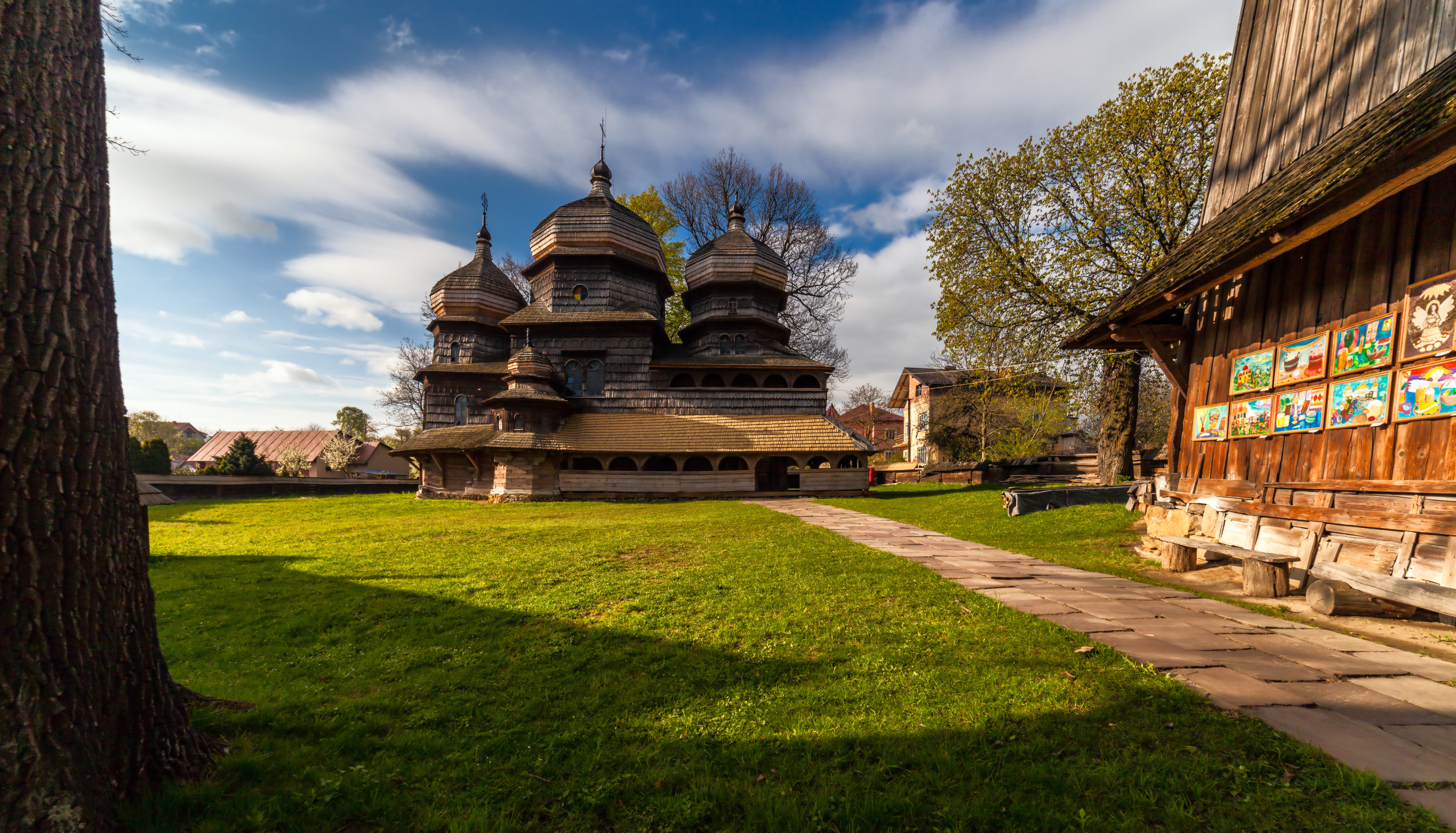
General view

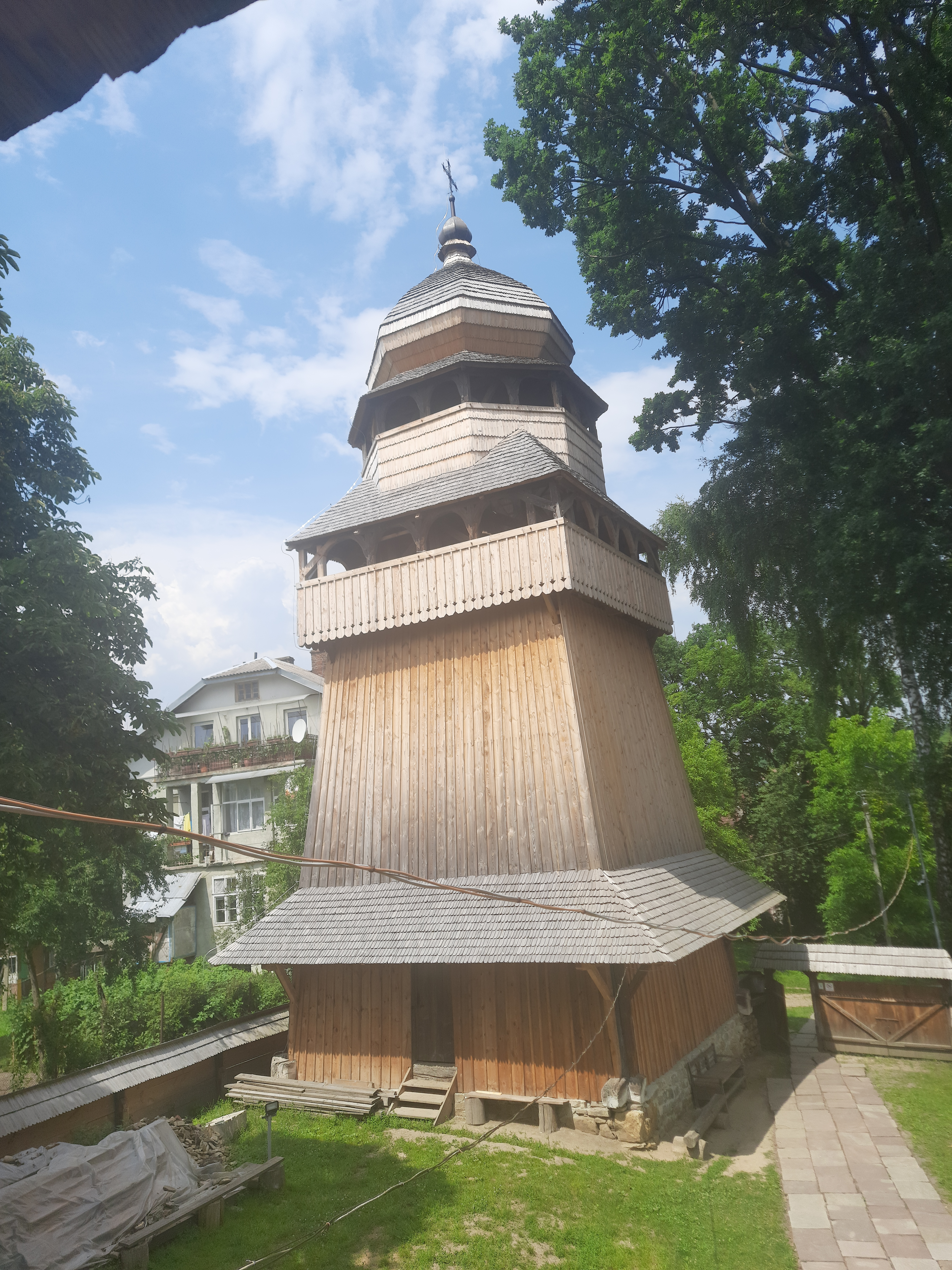
Bell tower

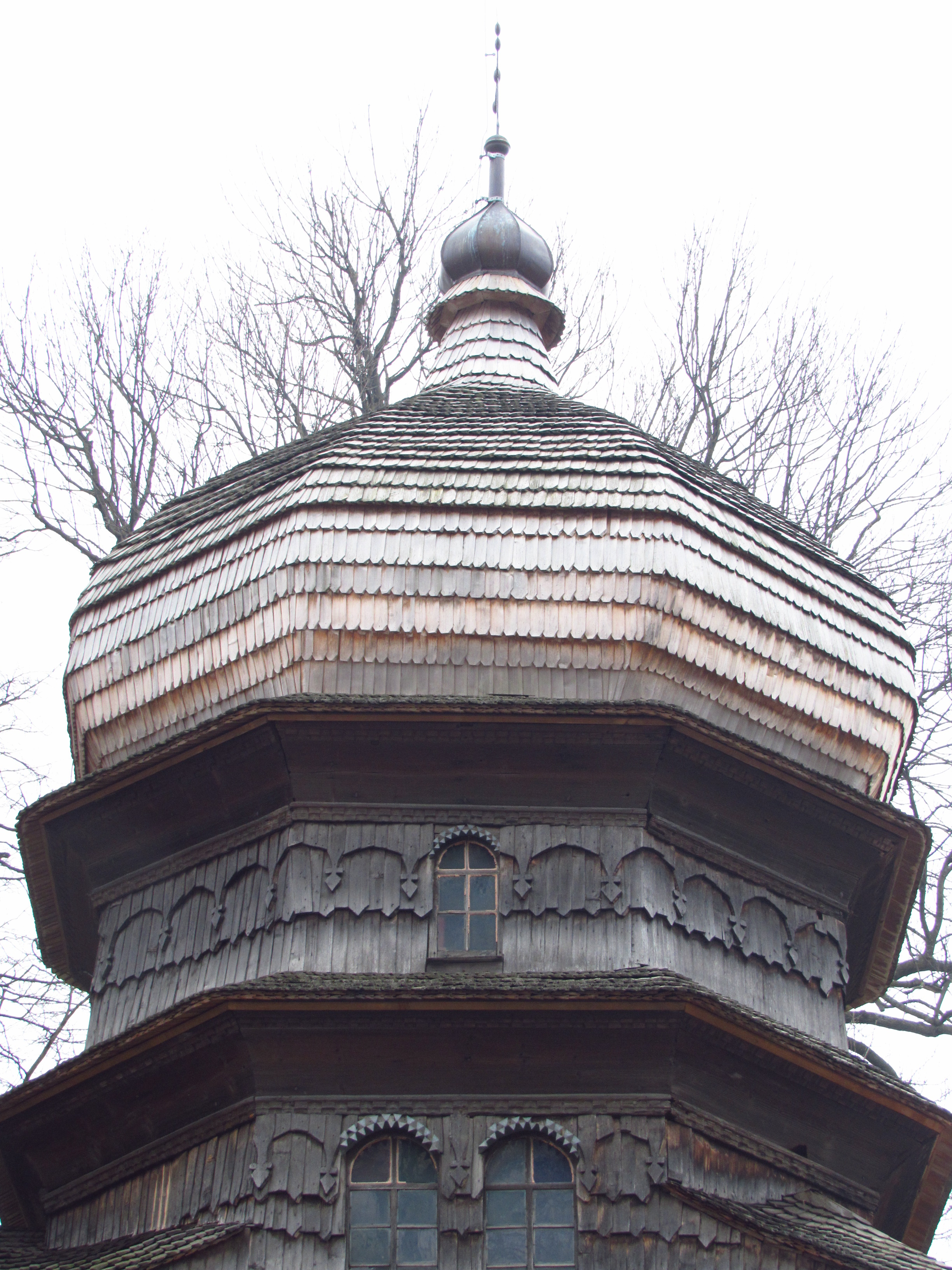
Cupola

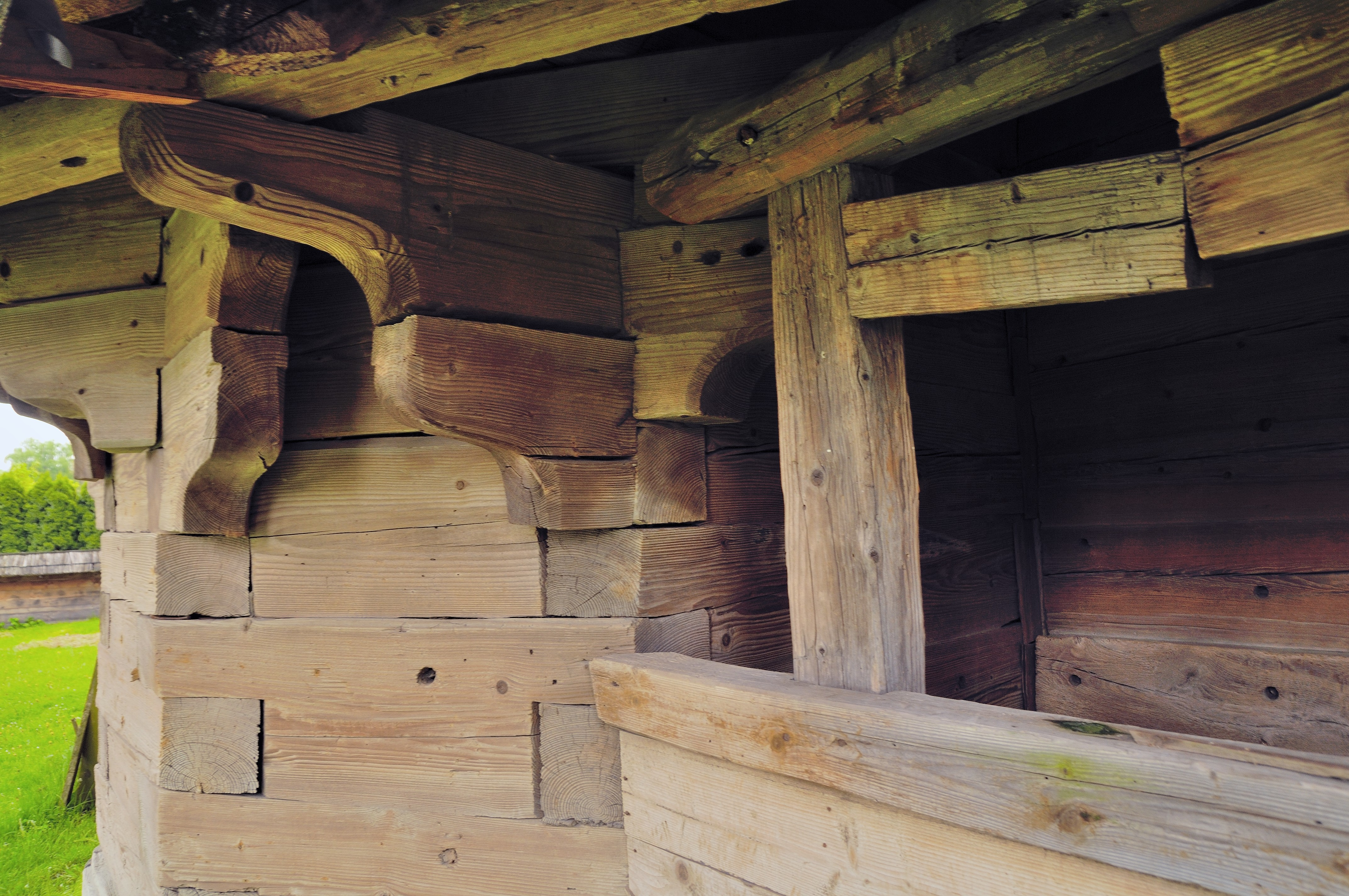

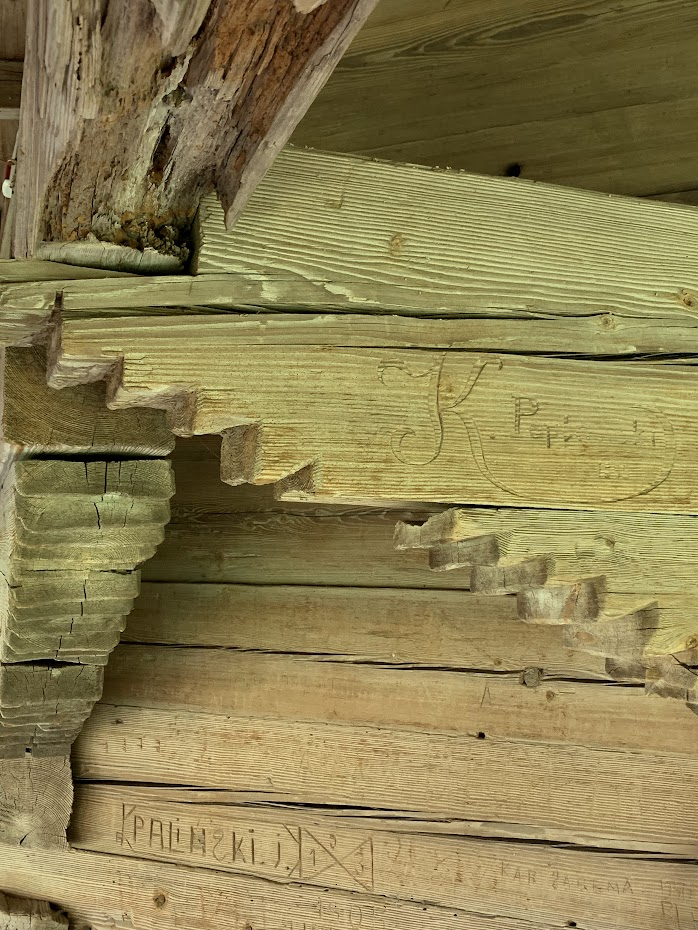
Writing on walls

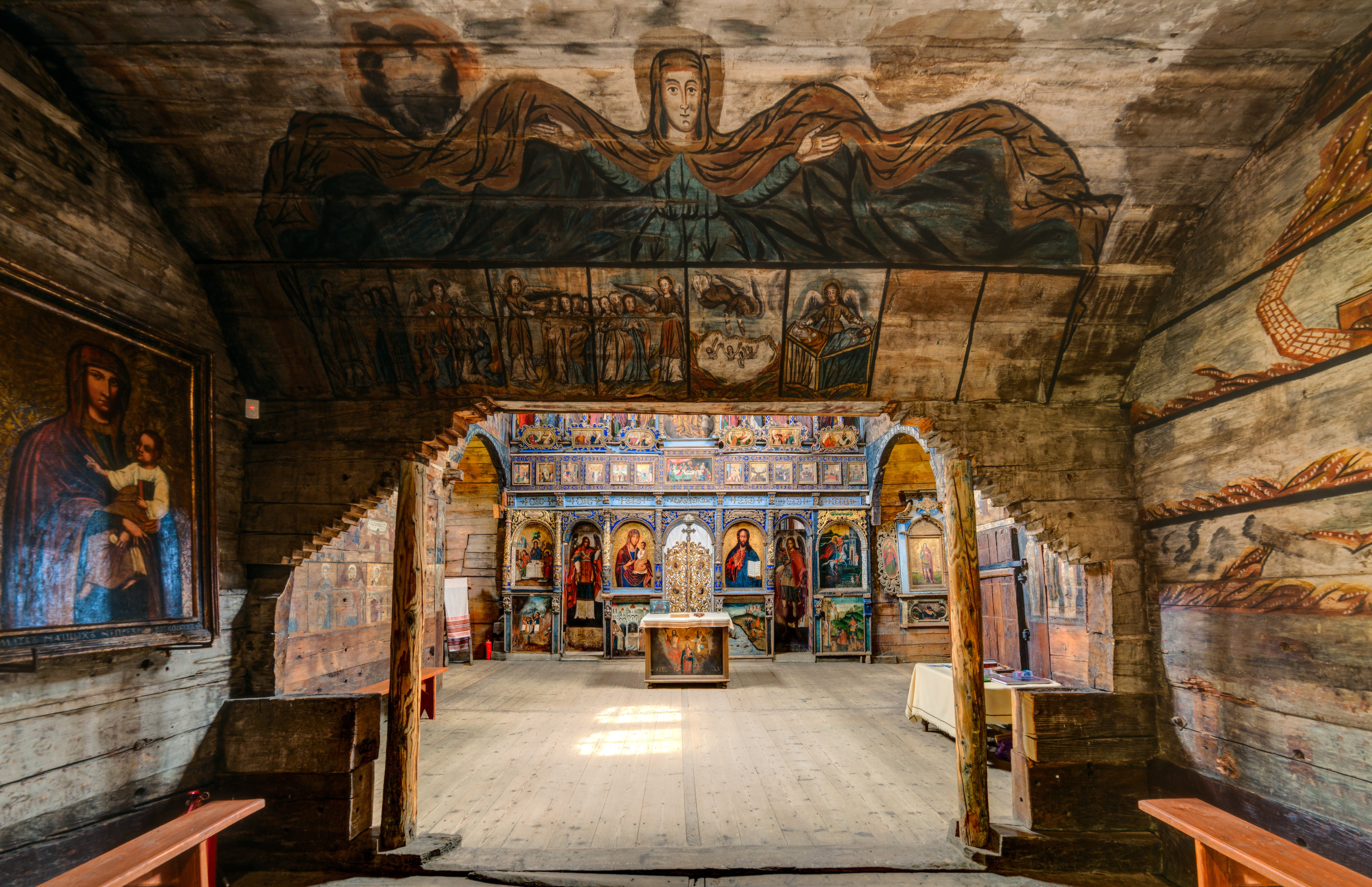
Interior

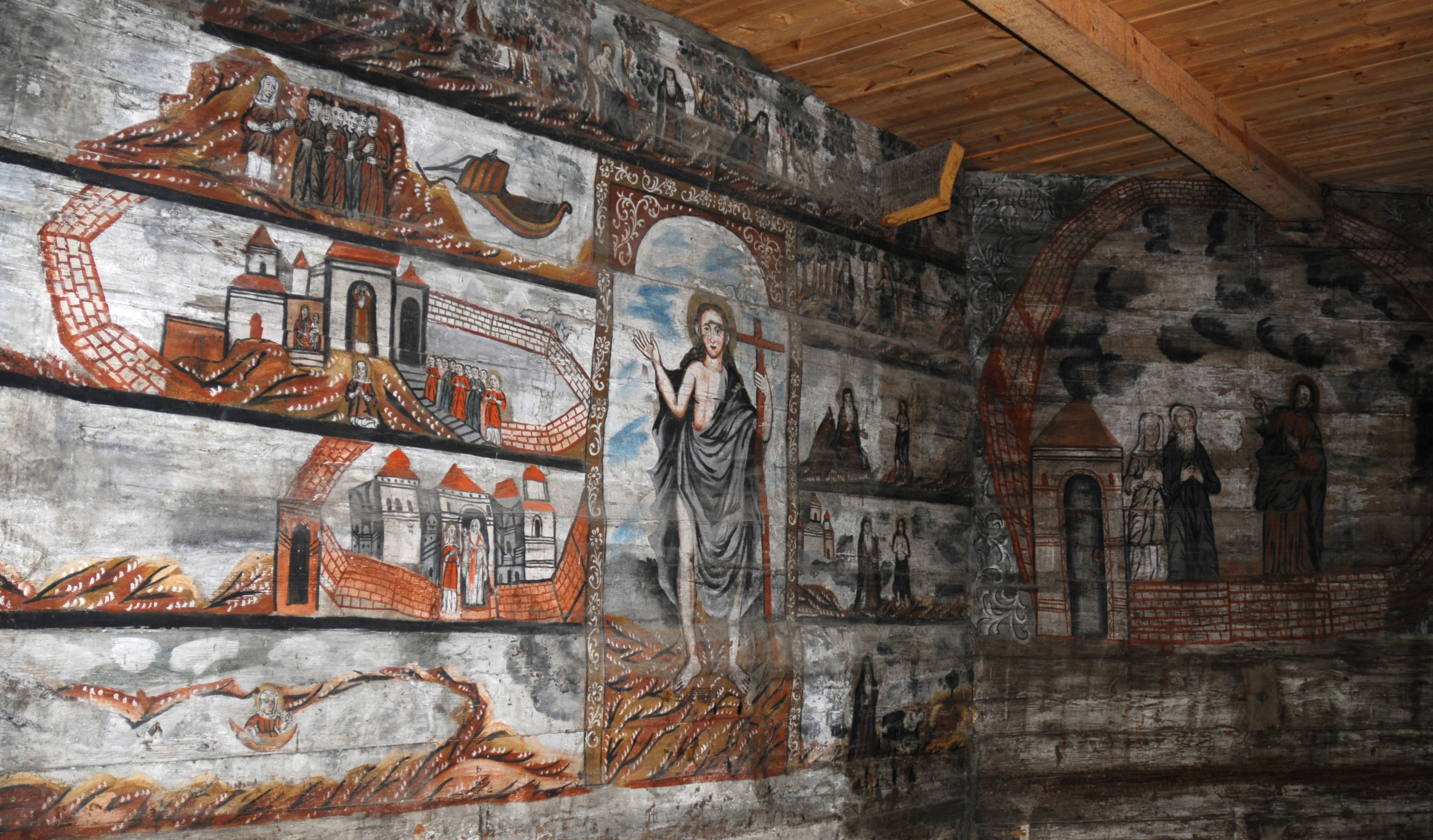

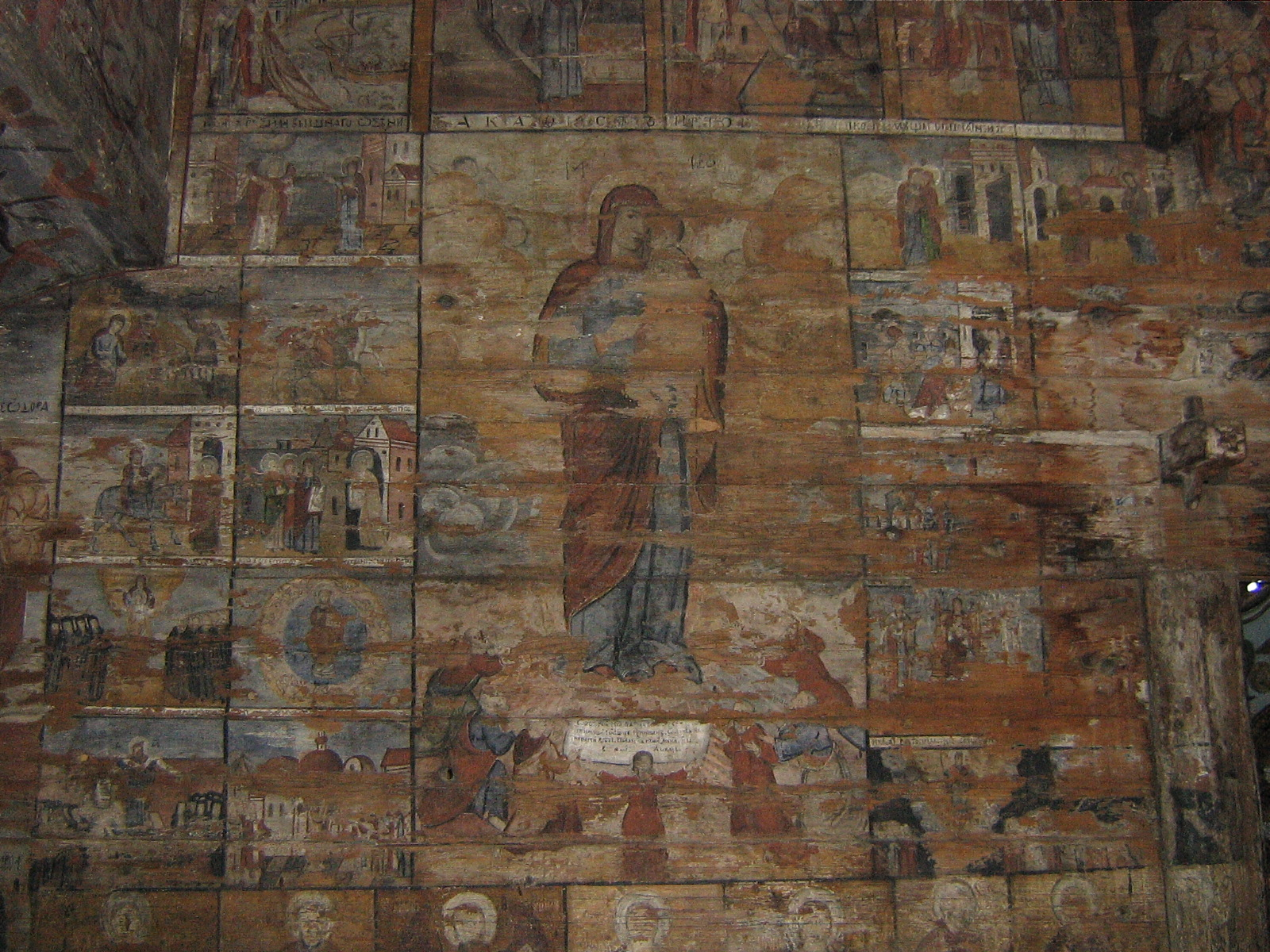

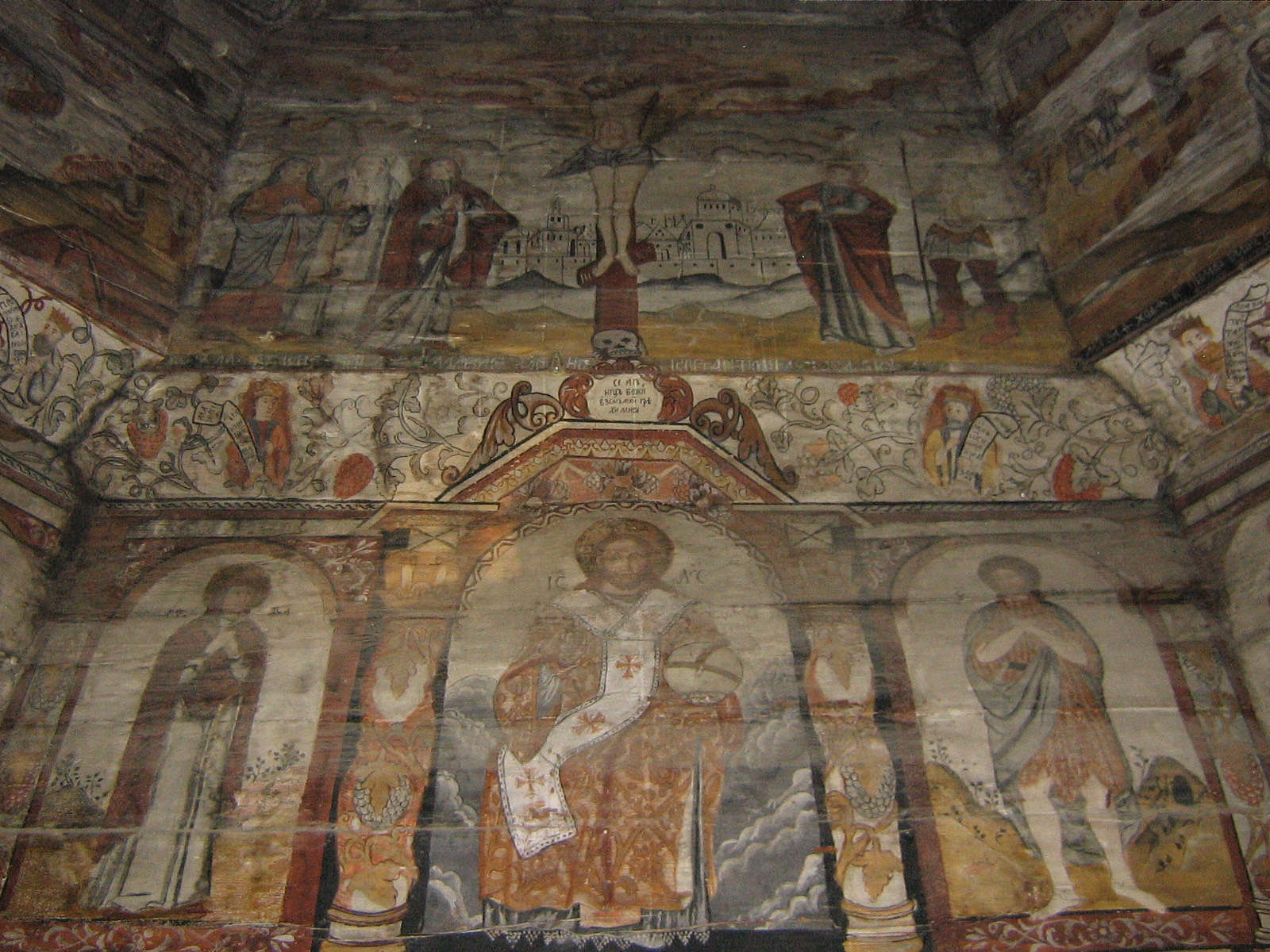

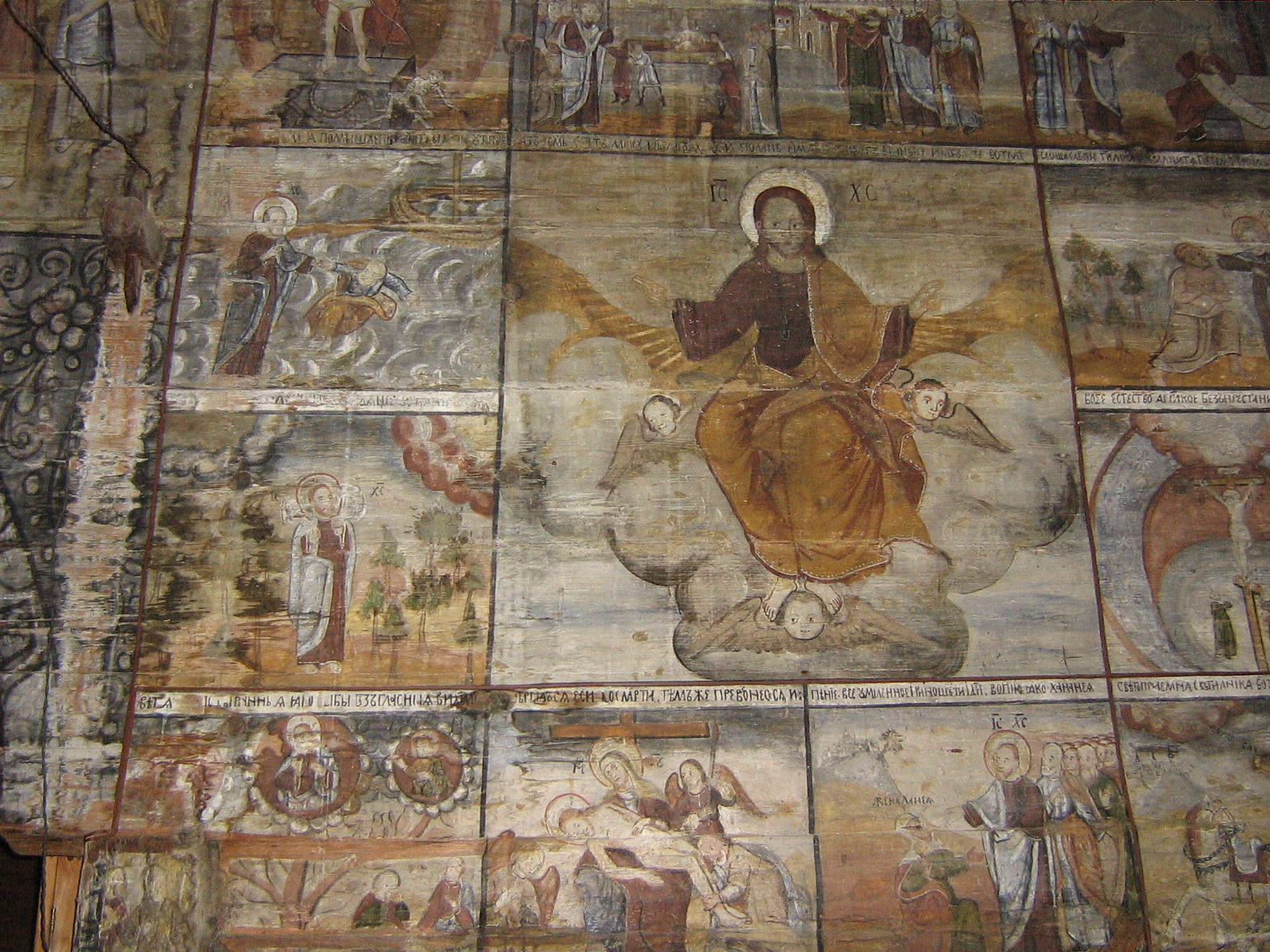

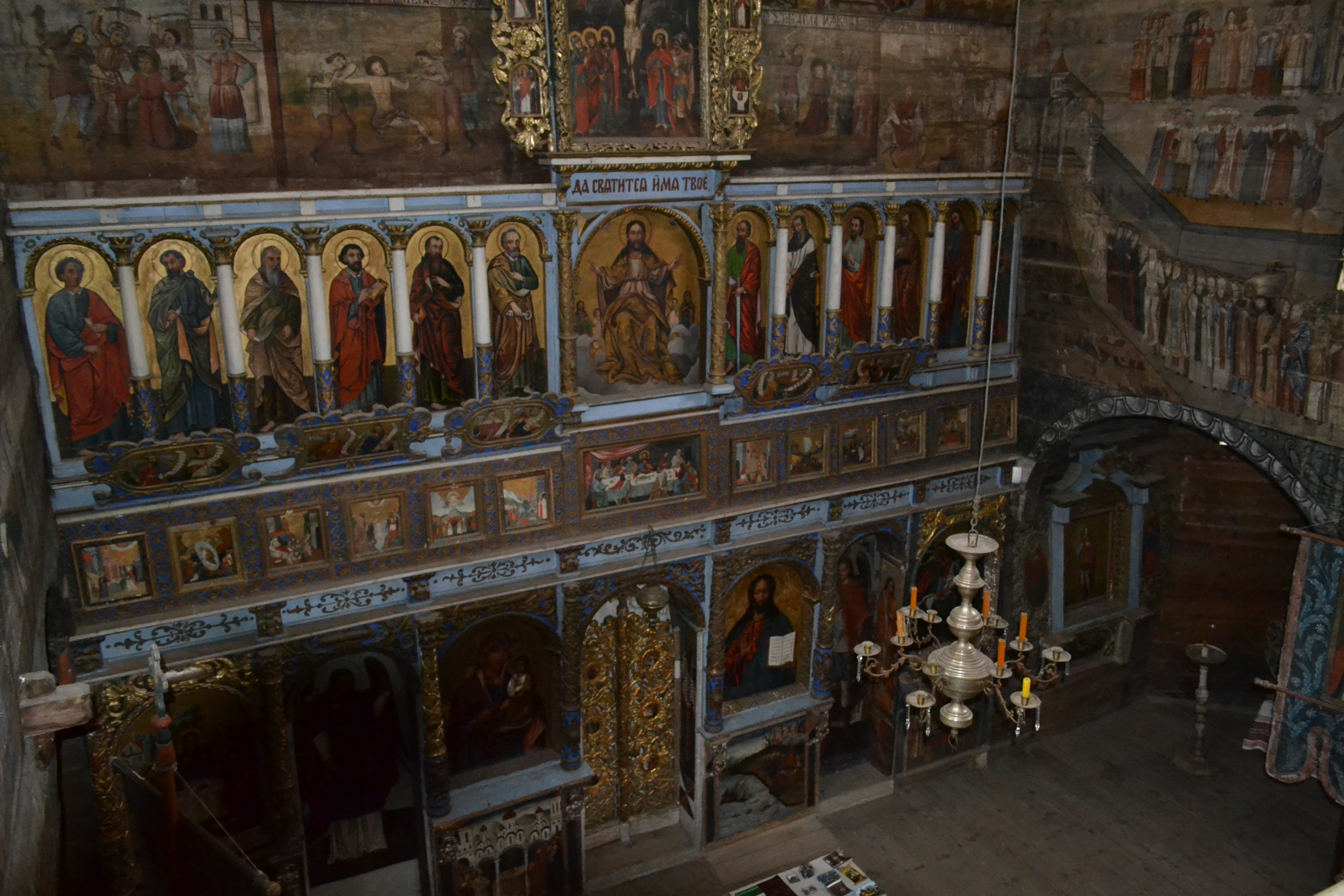
Iconostasis

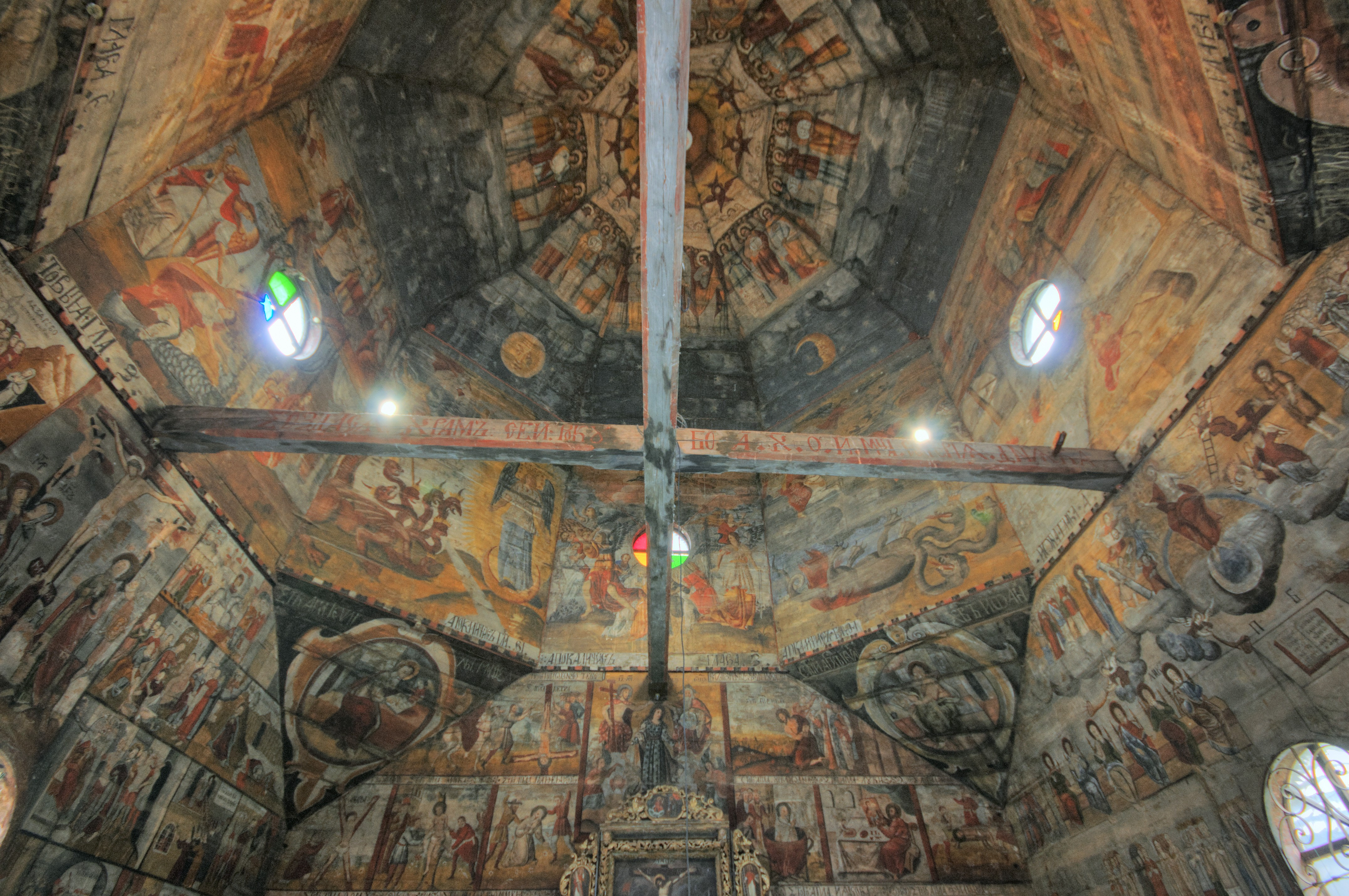
Ceiling

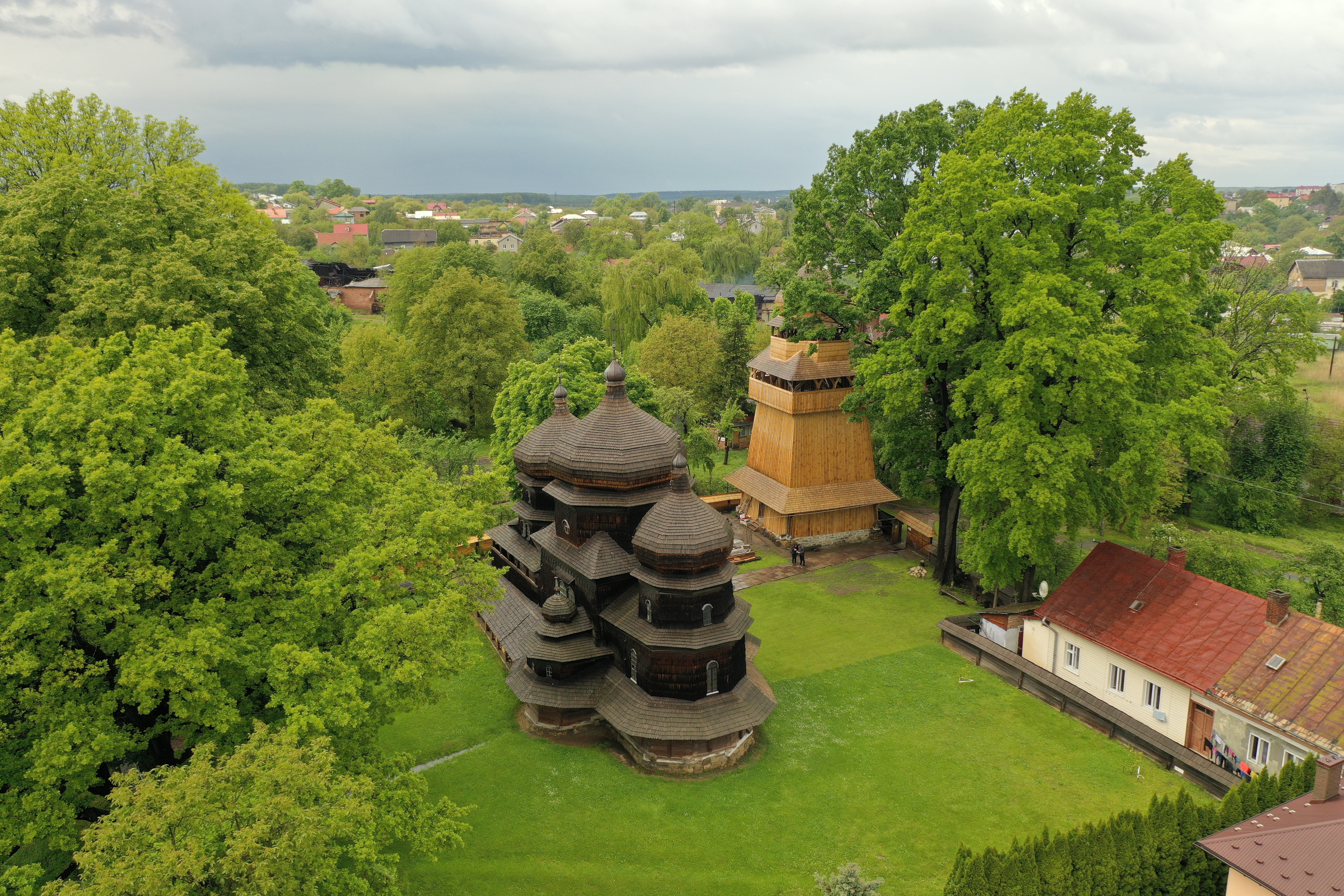
Aerial view

== See also ==
- Wooden Churches of Ukraine
- Saint George in devotions, traditions and prayers

== Sources ==
- Памятники градостроительства и архитектуры Украинской ССР. Киев: Будивельник, 1983–1986. Том 3, с. 98.
- Lev Skop. St. George's Church. Drohobych, 2012.
