= Church of St. George, Kneževo =

Serbian Orthodox church in Kneževo, Croatia

Church of St. George
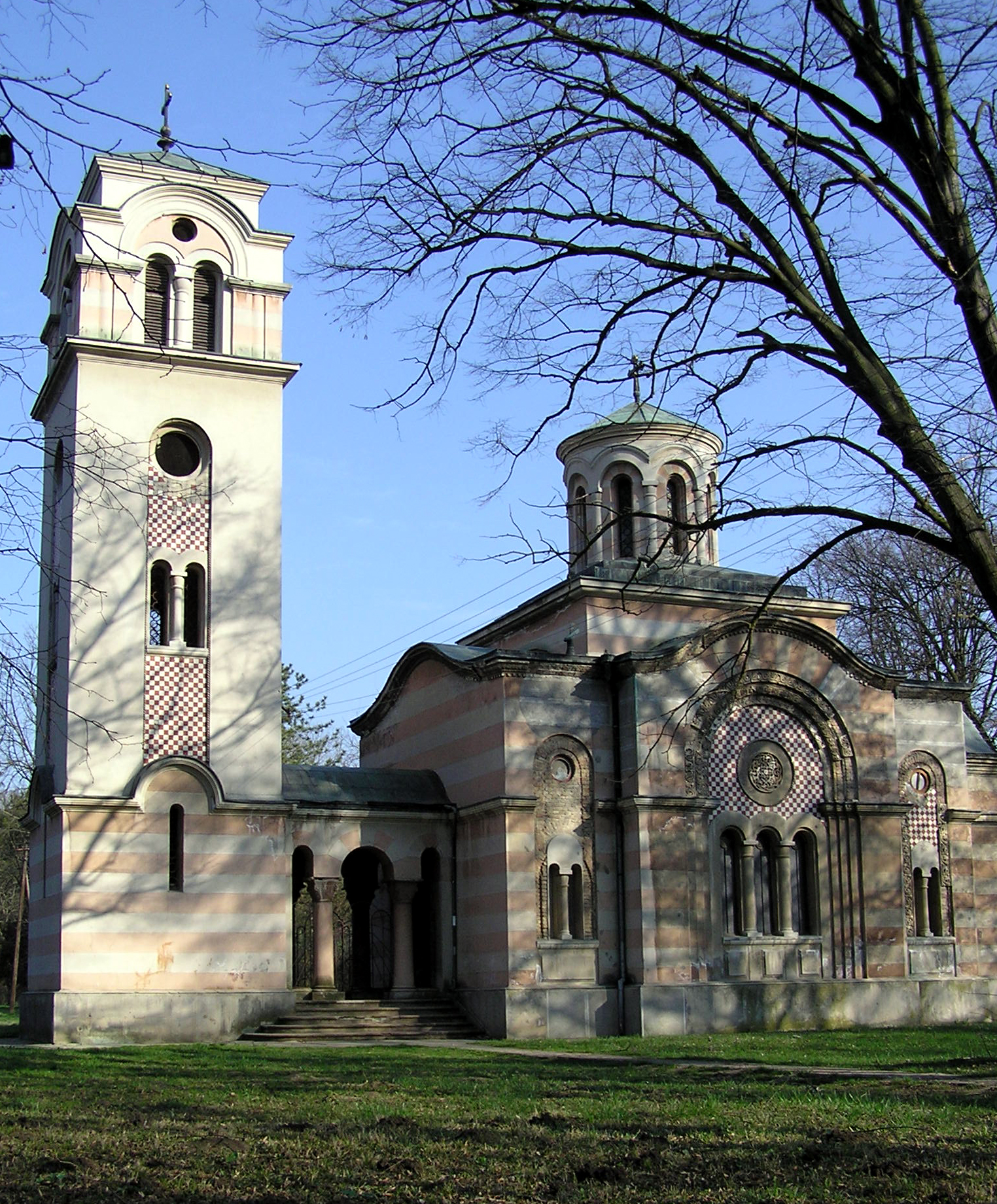
- Church of St. George
- Church of St. George
- 45°50′23″N 18°38′44″E
- Location: Kneževo
- Country: Croatia
- Denomination: Serbian Orthodox

History
- Dedication: St. George

Architecture
- Style: Baroque and Classicism
- Years built: 1929

Administration
- Archdiocese: Eparchy of Osijek Plain and Baranya

The Church of St. George (Serbo-Croatian: Црква светог Ђорђа, Crkva svetog Đorđa) is a Serbian Orthodox church located in Kneževo, eastern Croatia. It was commissioned in 1929 by King Alexander I of Yugoslavia as part of his royal summer residence. The church’s interior features two walnut-wood imperial thrones, one for the king and one for the queen. It is the only endowment of the Karađorđević royal family in this part of Croatia.

== History ==
Kneževo was first mentioned in 1214 under the name Lak. In 1905, when the village was part of the Kingdom of Hungary within Austria-Hungary (outside the autonomous Croatia-Slavonia), it had around 600 inhabitants, including 185 Orthodox Christians. After the end of World War I, the area became part of the newly established Kingdom of Serbs, Croats and Slovenes (firstly within the Banat, Bačka and Baranja and then the Danube Banovina) ruled by the House of Karađorđević.

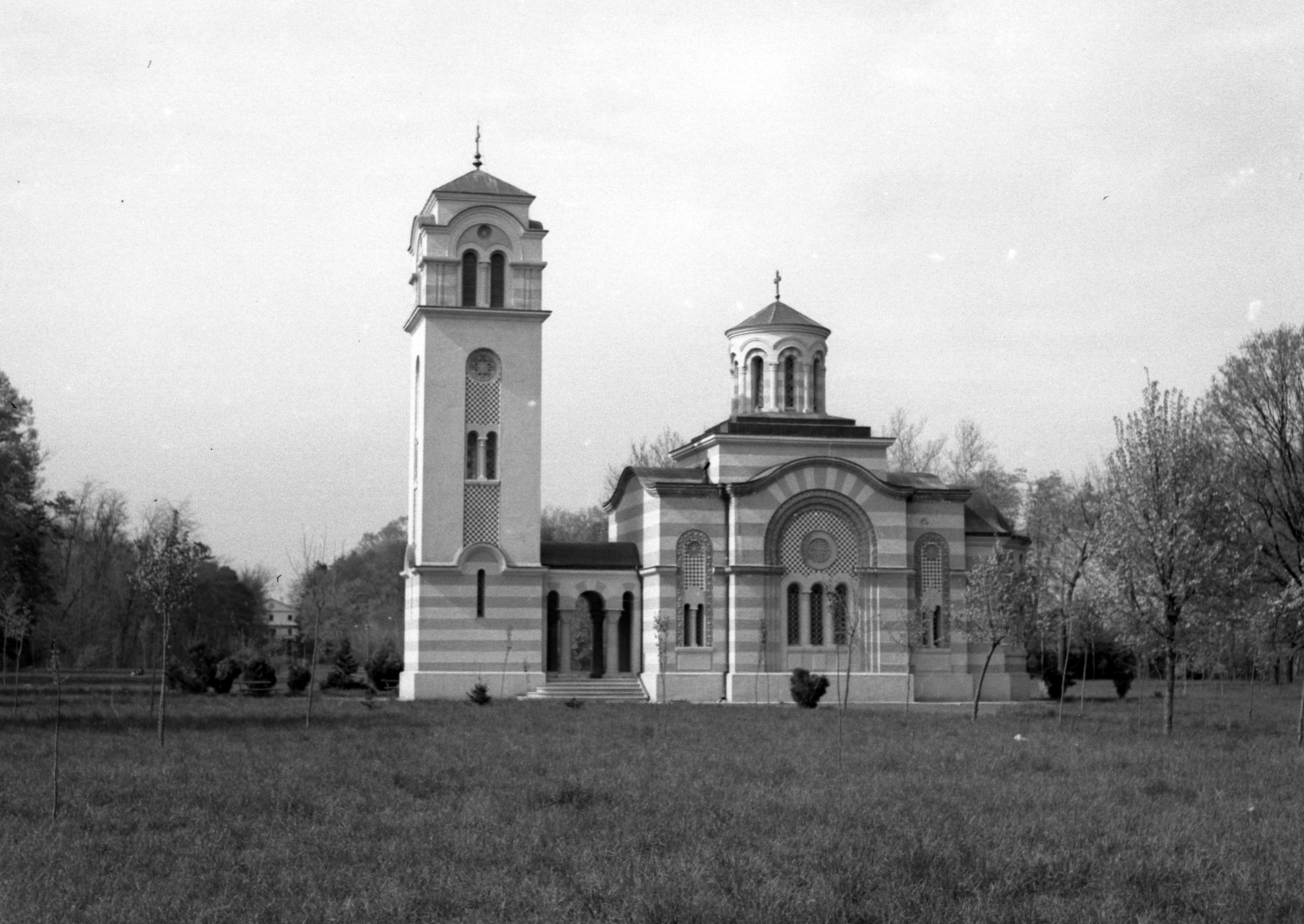
The church in 1941

The Church of St. George in Kneževo, village near the town of Beli Manastir, was built in 1929 as a part of the royal summer residence. The church is located within the historical core of Kneževo, which includes several notable buildings and sites such as the Kneževo park, the former Belje administrative building, and the former Belje restaurant. The church was built in the Byzantine Revival style, designed more like a large chapel for the royal residence rather than a Kneževo parish building. After the end of World War II in Yugoslavia, abolition of monarchy in the country and the establishment of the Socialist Republic of Croatia, the church was closed until the mid-1970s when painter Ivan Bens repainted the iconostasis. The church building was returned to the Serbian Orthodox Church at that same period.

On 29 November 2019, the parish celebrated the Vow Day of Saint Matthew the Apostle and Evangelist and the 90th anniversary of the church.

== See also ==
- List of Serbian Orthodox churches in Croatia
- Eparchy of Osijek Plain and Baranya
- Serbs of Croatia
