= Yelet Giorgis Church, Bulga =

Church in Yelet, Ethiopia

Coordinates: 9.196°N 39.317°E

Yelet Giorgis Church
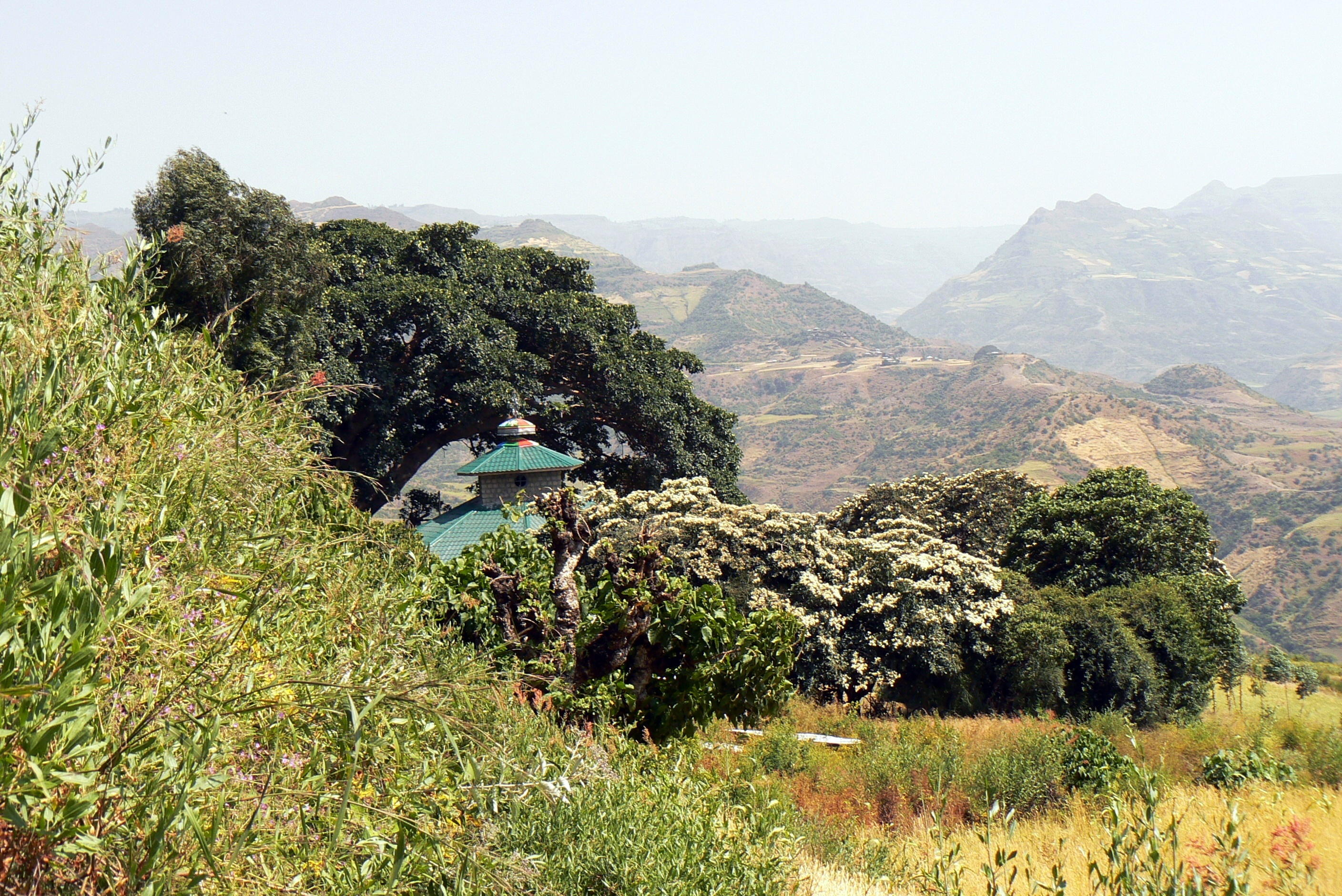
- Yelet Giorgis Church in the Bulga mountains

Religion
- Affiliation: Ethiopian Orthodox Tewahedo Church
- Rite: Alexandrian Rite
- Ecclesiastical or organisational status: cathedral
- Status: Active

Location
- Location: Yelet, Ethiopia
- Interactive map of Yelet Giorgis Church

Architecture
- Type: church

Yelet Giorgis Church is an Ethiopian Orthodox church in Yelet, Bulga, Ethiopia.

The old church building 1956 - 2004

The church is dedicated to Saint George, and has over 2,500 parishioners. The church body has been in existence since the 17th century.

The first edifice, a traditional circular thatch roof church, burnt down in 1950. A modern, iron roof church was built in its place by Dejazmach Kidane Woldemedhin and dedicated in 1956. This building was erected on the same church site and served its community for a further 51 years until a more modern, 8-sided stone building was built in its place during the years 2004–2007. The new church was dedicated on 23rd Tikmt 2000 (Ethiopian calendar), which corresponds to 3 November 2007 in the Gregorian calendar.

== See also ==
- Saint George: Devotions, traditions and prayers
- Yemrehana Krestos Church
