= St. George's Church, Sfântu Gheorghe =

Heritage site in Covasna County, Romania

Coordinates: 45°52′10″N 25°46′56″E

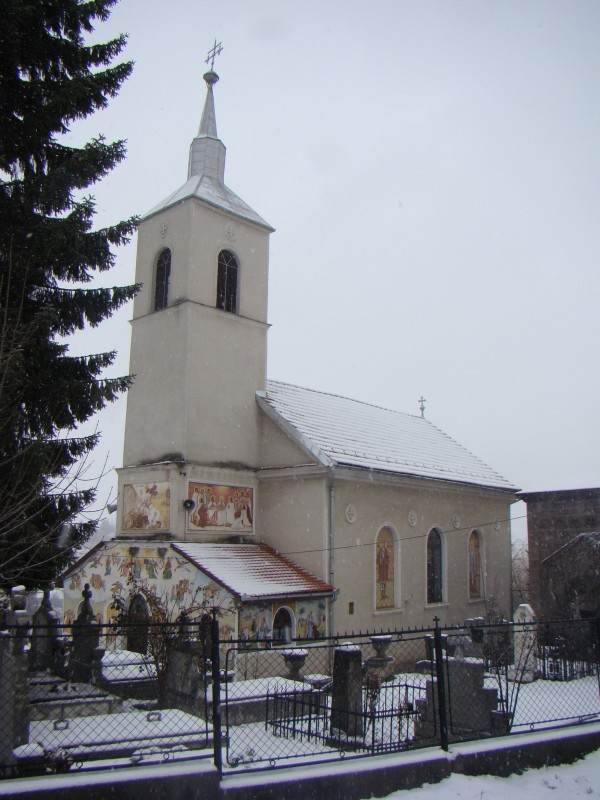
St. George’s Church

St. George's Church (Romanian: Biserica Sfântul Gheorghe) is a Romanian Orthodox church located at 1 Piața Andrei Șaguna, Sfântu Gheorghe, Romania. It is dedicated to Saint George.

The town’s Romanian community had a wooden church as early as 1750. In 1790, the authorities of the Principality of Transylvania approved the construction of a new Orthodox church. Another wooden church was built on the site of the old one. Later, in 1802, a stone spire was added, which survives to this day.

After 1850, the local Romanians began to demand a new church and school, both of which had fallen into disrepair. Their petitions asking to build in the town center, sent starting in 1862, went unanswered. Thus, they decided to rebuild the extant structures. In 1870, Metropolitan Andrei Șaguna sent an appeal for donations, which came from Transylvania as well as Romania. Șaguna consecrated the new church in 1872.

In 1916, during World War I, the church was used as a prison and then a barn for the horses of German troops, suffering serious damage. The priest was imprisoned from 1915 to 1917, charged with high treason. The church was repaired between 1919 and 1922, and new bells were donated. Metropolitan Nicolae Bălan rededicated the church in 1923.

A second Romanian church opened in Sfântu Gheorghe in 1924; in the autumn of 1940, following the Second Vienna Award, both priests left for Brașov under pressure from the new Hungarian authorities. The parish remained vacant until 1941, when Bishop Nicolae Colan named a new priest. Another priest left in 1990, during the ethnic tensions that followed the Romanian Revolution. Between 1790 and 1938, with only brief interruptions, the parish priests came from the Popoviciu family, several of whose members lie buried in the churchyard.

The church is rectangular, without apses. The altar is separated from the nave by a wooden iconostasis, which has icons from 1872. The church was repaired and the interior walls painted in 1993. Entrance is through the tower, which is made of fired brick and nearly 15 meters high. The nave is around 5 meters high. The thick walls hold eight stained glass windows in the nave and three in the altar. The church is listed as a historic monument by Romania's Ministry of Culture and Religious Affairs.
