= St. George Episcopal Church (Jacksonville) =

Historic church in Florida, United States

- U.S. National Register of Historic Places
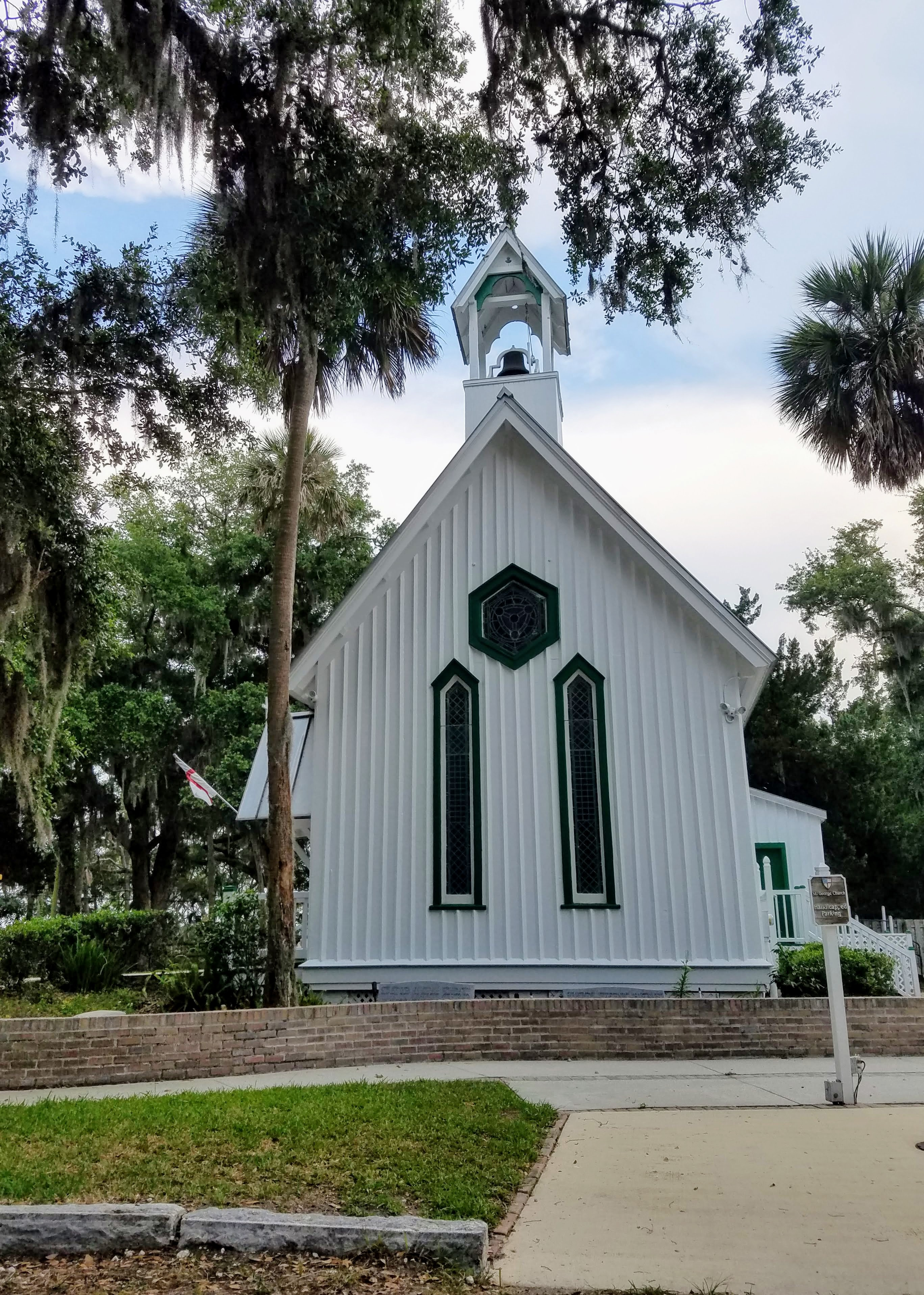
- St. George Episcopal Church 2019

- Location within Florida Location within the United States
- Location: 10560 East Fort George Road Fort George Island Jacksonville, Florida
- Coordinates: 30°24′48″N 81°25′48″W
- Area: less than one acre
- Built: 1882-1883
- Architect: Robert S. Schuyler
- Architectural style: Carpenter Gothic
- MPS: Florida's Carpenter Gothic Churches MPS
- NRHP reference No.: 02000839
- Added to NRHP: August 9, 2002

Saint George Episcopal Church is an historic Carpenter Gothic style Episcopal church located at 10560 East Fort George Road on Fort George Island in Jacksonville, Florida, in the United States. Built in 1882–1883, it was designed by architect Robert S. Schuyler of nearby Fernandina.

On August 9, 2002, it was added to the U.S. National Register of Historic Places as St. George Episcopal Church. It was a mission of the Diocese of Florida until 1990 when it became active parish.

== Gallery ==
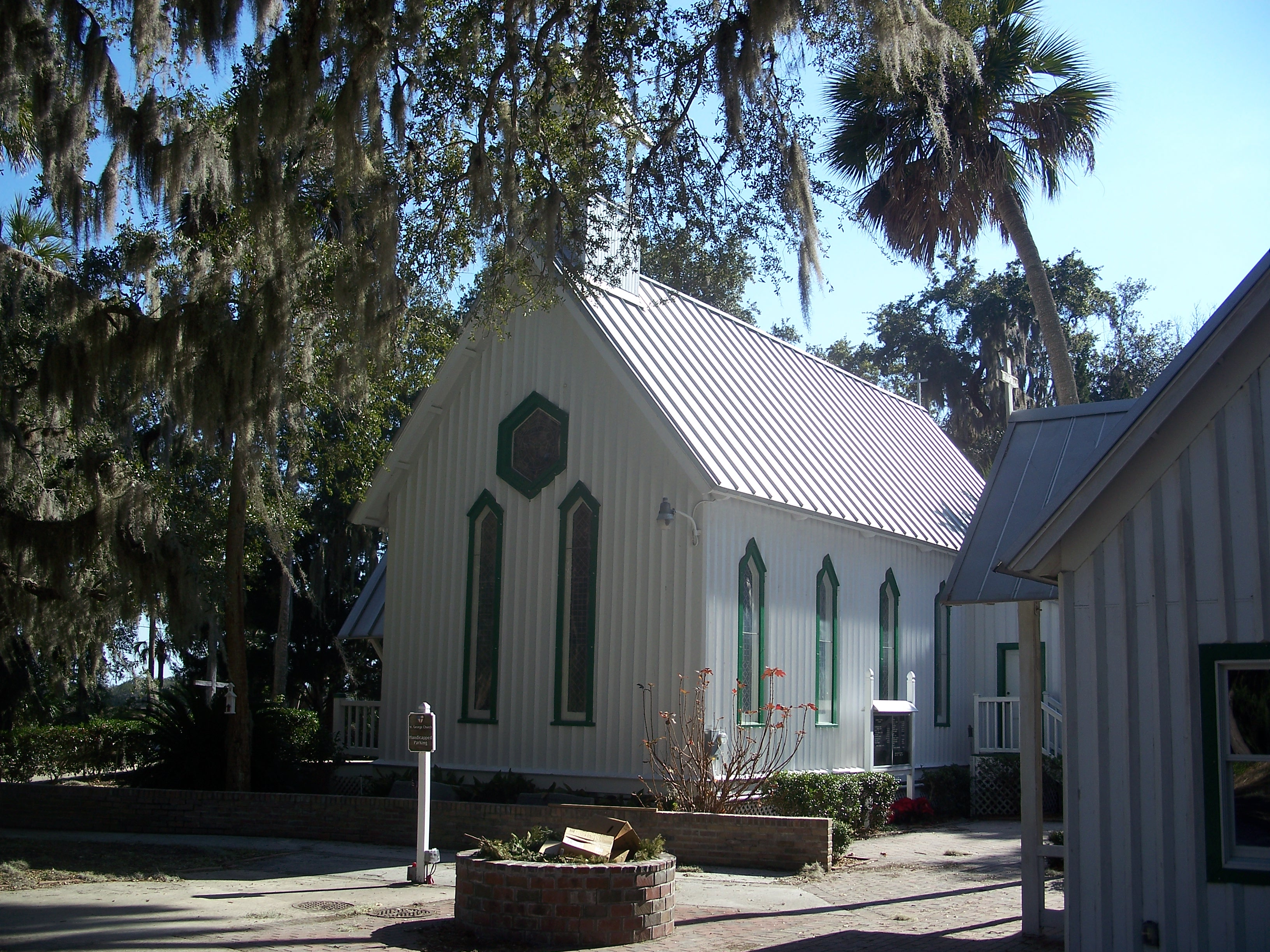
2011

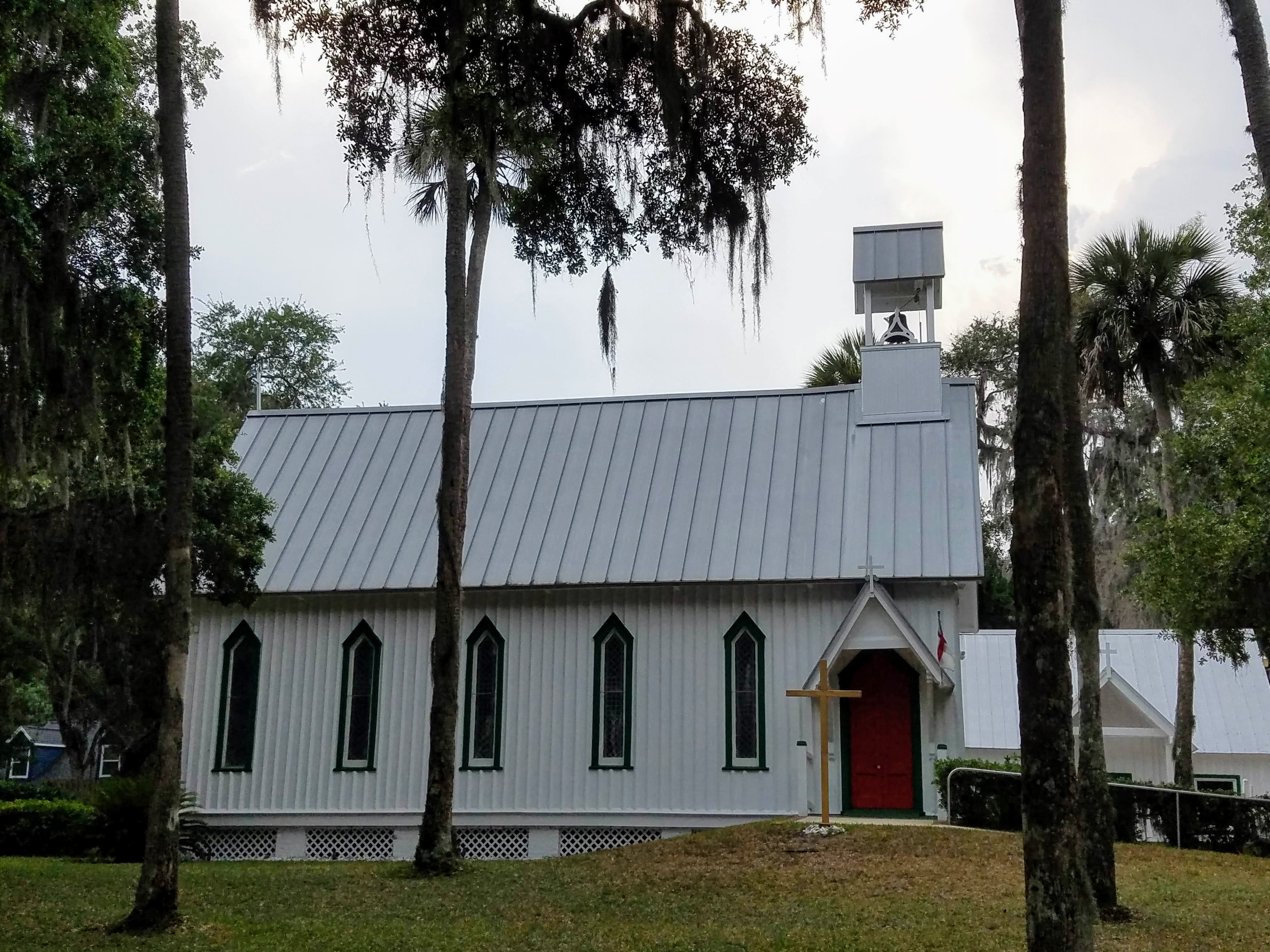
2019

== See also ==
- St. George's Episcopal Church (disambiguation)
