= South Cemetery Church, Focșani =

Heritage site in Vrancea County, Romania

Coordinates: 45°41′36″N 27°09′59″E

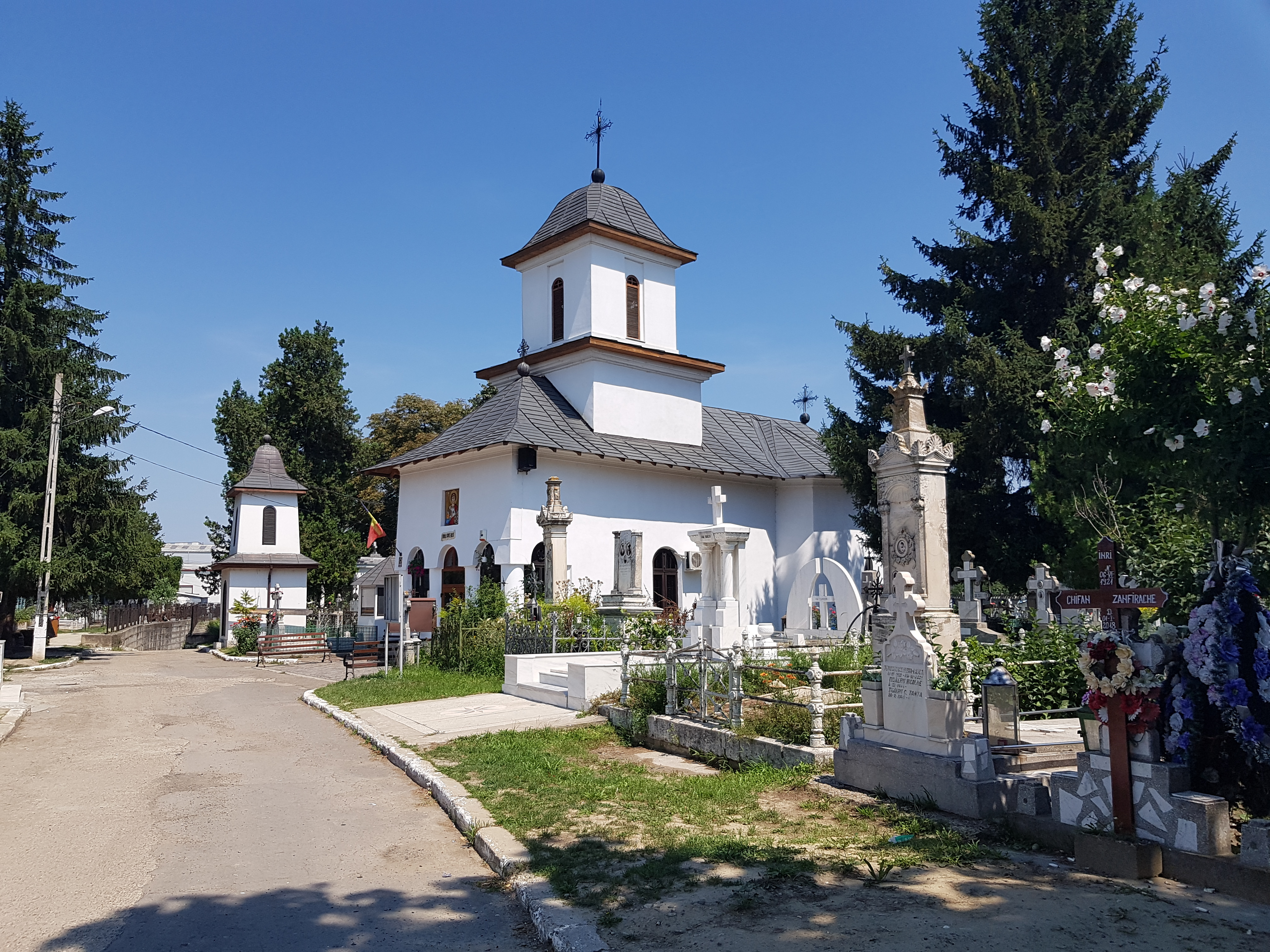
South Cemetery Church

The South Cemetery Church (Romanian: Biserica Sfântul Gheorghe - Cimitirul Sud) is a Romanian Orthodox church located at 17 Vâlcele Street in Focșani, Romania. It is dedicated to Saint George.

Located inside the city's South Cemetery, tradition holds that the church ktetor was Vlad the Impaler, grateful for defeating the Ottoman Army in the area. This notion was based on two inscriptions, one of which was carved into the stone above the entrance. Both inscriptions were destroyed by careless workers during an 1887 renovation. The initial structure, made of wood, also had Basarab Țepeluș cel Tânăr and Vlad Călugărul as ktetors. A marble tablet indicates that Constantine Mavrocordatos rebuilt the church in stone in 1742. The ruined structure was again restored in 1852, by two boyar families.

The church is cross-shaped, with porch, narthex, nave and altar, and a tower atop the porch. The tower is accessed through a spiral staircase attached to the narthex. The interior ceiling features semi-spherical vaults. The initially open porch has arches resting on large masonry pillars. The church is listed as a historic monument by Romania's Ministry of Culture and Religious Affairs.
