= St. George's Protestant Episcopal Church (Brooklyn) =

Church in Brooklyn, New York

- U.S. National Register of Historic Places
- New York City Landmark
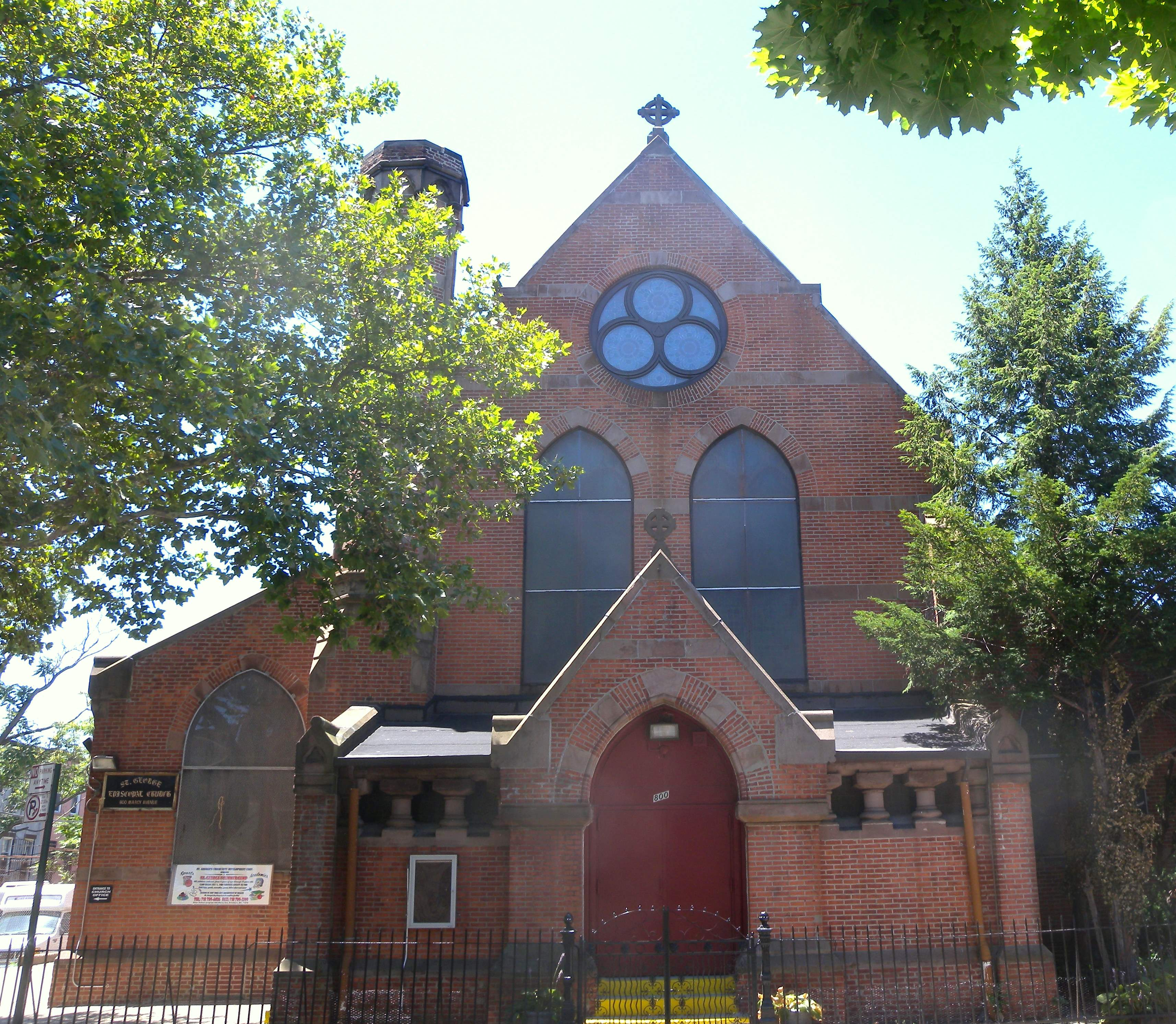

- Location within New York City Location within New York Location within the United States
- Location: 800 Marcy Ave., Brooklyn, New York
- Coordinates: 40°42′10″N 73°56′52″W
- Built: 1887
- Architect: R. M. Upjohn
- Architectural style: Gothic
- NRHP reference No.: 83001700

Significant dates
- Added to NRHP: September 8, 1983
- Designated NYCL: September 8, 1983

St. George's Protestant Episcopal Church, also known as St. George's Episcopal/Anglican Church, is a historic Episcopal church at 800 Marcy Avenue in Bedford-Stuyvesant, Brooklyn, in New York City. It was built in 1887 in the Gothic Revival style. It is constructed of red brick with light stone trim in a cruciform plan. Attached to the church is a small, one story Sunday school building. It was designed by architect Richard M. Upjohn (1828-1903).

It was listed on the National Register of Historic Places in 1983. The church continues to hold weekly worship services and Bible studies.

== See also ==
- List of New York City Designated Landmarks in Brooklyn
- National Register of Historic Places listings in Kings County, New York
