= Sankt Georgen =

Sankt Georgen may refer to several places, all named after the German name of Saint George:

== In Austria ==
- in Carinthia:
  - Sankt Georgen am Längsee in the district St. Veit an der Glan
  - Stift Sankt Georgen abbey near Sankt Georgen am Längsee
  - Sankt Georgen im Lavanttal in the district Wolfsberg
- in Lower Austria:
  - Sankt Georgen am Reith in the district Amstetten
  - Sankt Georgen am Ybbsfelde in the district Amstetten
  - Sankt Georgen an der Leys in the district Scheibbs
- in Salzburg:
  - Sankt Georgen bei Salzburg in the district Salzburg-Umgebung
- in Styria:
  - Sankt Georgen an der Stiefing in the district Leibniz
  - Sankt Georgen ob Judenburg in the district Judenburg
  - Sankt Georgen ob Murau in the district Murau
- in Upper Austria:
  - Sankt Georgen am Fillmannsbach in the district Braunau am Inn
  - Sankt Georgen am Walde in the district Perg
  - Sankt Georgen an der Gusen in the district Perg
  - Sankt Georgen bei Grieskirchen in the district Grieskirchen
  - Sankt Georgen bei Obernberg am Inn in the district Ried im Innkreis
  - Sankt Georgen im Attergau in the district Vöcklabruck
- St. Georgen, a church at Rennweg am Katschberg

== In Germany ==
- Sankt Georgen im Schwarzwald in Schwarzwald-Baar (district), Baden-Württemberg
- Sankt Georgen (Bayreuth), a district of Bayreuth
- Sankt Georgen (Freiburg), a district of Freiburg
- Sankt Georgen Graduate School of Philosophy and Theology, Frankfurt-am-Main

== In Romania ==
- Sfântu Gheorghe, the seat of Covasna County in Transylvania

== In Slovakia ==
- Svätý Jur (Sankt Georgen)
- Borský Svätý Jur (Bur-Sankt-Georg)

== In Slovenia ==
- Podkum, a village in the Municipality of Zagorje ob Savi in central Slovenia
- Podšentjur, a village in the Municipality of Litija in central Slovenia
- Šenčur, a village in the Municipality of Šenčur in northern Slovenia
- Sveti Jurij, Rogašovci, a village in the Municipality of Rogašovci in northeastern Slovenia

== See also ==
- St. George

Saint George

Locales named after St George

Schools
St. George's University · St. George's College (disambiguation) · St. George's School (disambiguation)

Buildings
St George's Church (disambiguation) · St. George's Cathedral (disambiguation) · St George's Hospital (disambiguation)

Other saints
George, Martyr of Córdoba
