= San Jorge =

San Jorge is Spanish for Saint George.

San Jorge may refer to:

== Argentina ==
- Autódromo Parque de la Velocidad de San Jorge, a motorsports circuit
- San Jorge de Tucumán, a football club
- San Jorge Gulf, a bay opening to the Atlantic

== Bolivia ==
- Laguna San Jorge, a lake
- San Jorge, La Paz, a neighborhood in La Paz

== Colombia ==
- San Jorge River, a river
- Apostolic Vicariate of San Jorge, former Roman Catholic vicariate in Montelíbano

== El Salvador ==
- San Jorge, San Miguel

== Guatemala ==
- San Jorge, Zacapa

== Honduras ==
- San Jorge, Ocotepeque
- Estadio San Jorge, a sports stadium
- San Jorge de Olancho, a former town near Olanchito

== Mexico ==
- San Jorge Nuchita
- San Jorge Nuchita Mixtec, a regional language

== Nicaragua ==
- San Jorge, Rivas

== Paraguay ==
- San Jorge (Asunción), a neighborhood

== Philippines ==
- San Jorge, Samar

== Puerto Rico ==
- Academia San Jorge, a school in San Juan

== Solomon Islands ==
- San Jorge Island, an island

== Spain ==
- San Jorge, Castellón, a municipality in Valencia Community
- Iglesia de San Jorge (Manzaneda), a church in Asturias
- Iglesia de San Jorge (A Coruña), a church in Galicia
- Church of San Jorge (Alcalá de los Gazules)
- Order of San Jorge de Alfama, a former Aragonese order of chivalry
- San Jorge de Heres, a parish also known as Heres (Gozón)
- San Jorge, a parish also known as La Peral
- Castle of San Jorge (Seville)
- Universidad San Jorge (Zaragoza)

== United States ==
- San Jorge, a nickname for St. George, Utah

== Uruguay ==
- San Jorge, Uruguay

== See also ==
- São Jorge (disambiguation) - Portuguese
- Saint George (disambiguation) - English
