= Canton of Saulzais-le-Potier =

Coordinates: 46°35′59″N 2°29′48″E

Saulzais-le-Potier
- Former canton
- Interactive map of Saulzais-le-Potier
- Country: France
- Region: Centre-Val de Loire
- Department: Cher
- No. of communes: {{{nbcomm}}}
- Disbanded: 2015
- Area: 276.41 km^{2} (106.72 sq mi)
- Population (2012): 3,526
  - Density: 12.76/km^{2} (33.04/sq mi)

The Canton of Saulzais-le-Potier is a former canton situated in the Cher département and in the Centre region of France. It was disbanded following the French canton reorganisation which came into effect in March 2015. It consisted of 11 communes, which joined the canton of Châteaumeillant in 2015. It had 3,526 inhabitants (2012).

== Geography ==
An area of forestry and farming in the southern part of the arrondissement of Saint-Amand-Montrond centred on the town of Saulzais-le-Potier. The altitude varies from 152m at Saint-Georges-de-Poisieux to 367m at Vesdun, with an average altitude of 228m.

The canton comprised 11 communes:

- Ainay-le-Vieil
- Arcomps
- La Celette
- Épineuil-le-Fleuriel
- Faverdines
- Loye-sur-Arnon
- La Perche
- Saint-Georges-de-Poisieux
- Saint-Vitte
- Saulzais-le-Potier
- Vesdun

== Population ==
Historical population Canton of Saulzais-le-Potier
Year	1962	1968	1975	1982	1990	1999
Pop.	4,061	4,567	3,882	3,626	3,471	3,376
±%	—	+12.5%	−15.0%	−6.6%	−4.3%	−2.7%
From the year 1962 on: No double counting – residents of multiple communes (e.g. students and military personnel) are counted only once. Source: INSEE

== See also ==
- Arrondissements of the Cher department
- Cantons of the Cher department
- Communes of the Cher department
