= Saint-Georges =

Saint-Georges may refer to:

== People ==
- Didia Saint Georges (1888–1979), Romanian composer
- Joseph Bologne, Chevalier de Saint-Georges (1745–1799), French composer and violinist
  - Saint-Georges International Music Festival, Guadeloupe
- Jules-Henri Vernoy de Saint-Georges (1799–1875), French librettist
- Saint-Georges de Bouhélier (1876–1947), French poet and dramatist

== Places ==
=== Belgium ===
- Saint-Georges-sur-Meuse, a municipality of Wallonia in the province of Liège

=== Canada ===
- Saint-Georges, Quebec, a city in the Beauce-Sartigan Regional County Municipality
  - Saint-Georges Aerodrome
- Saint-Georges, Shawinigan, a sector of Shawinigan, Quebec
- Saint-Georges-de-Cacouna village and Saint-Georges-de-Cacouna parish, merged to form Cacouna, Quebec
- Saint-Georges-de-Clarenceville, Quebec, now Clarenceville
- Saint-Georges-de-Malbaie, a community within the city of Percé, Quebec
- Saint-Georges-de-Windsor, Quebec, a municipality
- Saint-Georges River, a tributary of the Chêne River in Quebec

=== France ===
==== Settlements ====
- Saint-Georges, Cantal
- Saint-Georges, Charente
- Saint-Georges, Gers
- Saint-Georges, French Guiana, or Saint-Georges-de-l'Oyapock
- Saint-Georges, Lot-et-Garonne
- Saint-Georges, Lyon, a neighbourhood of Lyon
- Saint-Georges, Moselle
- Saint-Georges, Pas-de-Calais
- Saint-Georges, Tarn-et-Garonne
- Saint-Georges-Antignac, in the Charente-Maritime département
- Saint-Georges-Armont, in the Doubs département
- Saint-Georges-Blancaneix, in the Dordogne département
- Saint-Georges-Buttavent, in the Mayenne département
- Saint-Georges-d'Annebecq, in the Orne département
- Saint-Georges-d'Aunay, in the Calvados département
- Saint-Georges-d'Aurac, in the Haute-Loire département
- Saint-Georges-de-Baroille, in the Loire département
- Saint-Georges-de-Bohon, in the Manche département
- Saint-Georges-de-Chesné, in the Ille-et-Vilaine département
- Saint-Georges-de-Commiers, in the Isère département
- Saint-Georges-de-Didonne, in the Charente-Maritime département
- Saint-Georges-de-Gréhaigne, in the Ille-et-Vilaine département
- Saint-Georges-de-la-Couée, in the Sarthe département
- Saint-Georges-de-la-Rivière, in the Manche département
- Saint-Georges-de-Lévéjac, in the Lozère département
- Saint-Georges-de-Livoye, in the Manche département
- Saint-Georges-d'Elle, in the Manche département
- Saint-Georges-de-Longuepierre, in the Charente-Maritime département
- Saint-Georges-de-Luzençon, in the Aveyron département
- Saint-Georges-de-Mons, in the Puy-de-Dôme département
- Saint-Georges-de-Montaigu, in the Vendée département
- Saint-Georges-de-Montclard, in the Dordogne département
- Saint-Georges-de-Noisné, in the Deux-Sèvres département
- Saint-Georges-de-Pointindoux, in the Vendée département
- Saint-Georges-de-Poisieux, in the Cher département
- Saint-Georges-de-Reintembault, in the Ille-et-Vilaine département
- Saint-Georges-de-Reneins, in the Rhône département
- Saint-Georges-de-Rex, in the Deux-Sèvres département
- Saint-Georges-de-Rouelley, in the Manche département
- Saint-Georges-des-Agoûts, in the Charente-Maritime département
- Saint-Georges-des-Coteaux, in the Charente-Maritime département
- Saint-Georges-des-Gardes, in the Maine-et-Loire département
- Saint-Georges-des-Groseillers, in the Orne département
- Saint-Georges-des-Sept-Voies, in the Maine-et-Loire département
- Saint-Georges-d'Espéranche, in the Isère département
- Saint-Georges-d'Hurtières, in the Savoie département
- Saint-Georges-d'Oléron, in the Charente-Maritime département
- Saint-Georges-d'Orques, in the Hérault département
- Saint-Georges-du-Bois, Charente-Maritime
- Saint-Georges-du-Bois, Maine-et-Loire
- Saint-Georges-du-Bois, Sarthe
- Saint-Georges-du-Mesnil, in the Eure département
- Saint-Georges-du-Rosay, in the Sarthe département
- Saint-Georges-du-Vièvre, in the Eure département
- Saint-Georges-en-Auge, in the Calvados département
- Saint-Georges-en-Couzan, in the Loire département
- Saint-Georges-Haute-Ville, in the Loire département
- Saint-Georges-la-Pouge, in the Creuse département
- Saint-Georges-Lagricol, in the Haute-Loire département
- Saint-Georges-le-Fléchard, in the Mayenne département
- Saint-Georges-le-Gaultier, in the Pays de la Loire département
- Saint-Georges-lès-Baillargeaux, in the Vienne département
- Saint-Georges-les-Bains, in the Ardèche département
- Saint-Georges-les-Landes, in the Haute-Vienne département
- Saint-Georges-Montcocq, in the Manche département
- Saint-Georges-Motel, in the Eure département
- Saint-Georges-Nigremont, in the Creuse département
- Saint-Georges-sur-Allier, in the Puy-de-Dôme département
- Saint-Georges-sur-Arnon, in the Indre département
- Saint-Georges-sur-Baulche, in the Yonne département
- Saint-Georges-sur-Cher, in the Loire-et-Cher département
- Saint-Georges-sur-Erve, in the Pays de la Loire département
- Saint-Georges-sur-Eure, in the Eure-et-Loire département
- Saint-Georges-sur-Fontaine, in the Seine-Maritime département
- Saint-Georges-sur-l'Aa, in the Nord département
- Saint-Georges-sur-la-Prée, in the Cher département
- Saint-Georges-sur-Layon, in the Maine-et-Loire département
- Saint-Georges-sur-Loire, in the Maine-et-Loire département
- Saint-Georges-sur-Moulon, in the Cher département
- Saint-Georges-sur-Renon, in the Ain département

==== Other places ====
- Abbey of Saint-Georges, Boscherville, a former Benedictine abbey in Saint-Martin-de-Boscherville in the Seine-Maritime department
- Abbey of Saint-Georges-du-Bois, a Benedictine monastery in Saint-Martin-des-Bois in the Loir-et-Cher department
- St. George's Church, Sélestat, a Gothic church in Sélestat, Bas-Rhin, Alsace
- Saint-Georges-de-l'Oyapock Airport, Saint-Georges, French Guiana
- Saint-Georges station, a Paris Metro station in the 9th arrondissement
- Saint-Georges-Saint-Émilion AOC, an Appellation d'origine contrôlée for wine in the Bordeaux wine region

=== Grenada ===
- St. George's, Grenada

=== Montserrat ===
- Saint Georges Parish, Montserrat

=== United Kingdom ===
- St. Georges, North Somerset, England

=== United States ===
- Saint Georges, Delaware

== See also ==
- Saint George (disambiguation)
