= Saint George (disambiguation) =

Saint George was a soldier in the Roman army in the 3rd and 4th centuries AD, venerated as a Christian martyr.

Saint George or Saint George's may also refer to:

== People ==
=== Eastern Orthodox ===
- George I of Constantinople (died 686), Ecumenical Patriarch of Constantinople from 679 to 686
- George the Hagiorite (1009–1065), Georgian monk, theologian and translator
- George of Chqondidi (died c. 1118), Archbishop of Chqondidi and advisor to King David IV
- George II of Vladimir (1188–1238), or Yuri II, Grand Prince of Vladimir and martyr
- George of Kratovo (died 1515), Serbian or Bulgarian silversmith and neomartyr
- George of Mogilev (1717–1795), Russian archbishop
- Georgy Kossov (1855–1928), or Yegor Chekryakovsky, Russian priest and starets
- George of Slavonia (1911–1941), or Đorđe Bogić, Serbian priest and hieromartyr
- George of Drama (1901–1959), Caucasus Greek monk and elder

=== Oriental Orthodox ===
- George I of Antioch, Syriac Patriarch of Antioch (died 790)

=== Roman Catholic ===
- George Preca (1880–1962), Maltese priest and founder of the Society of Christian Doctrine

=== Other or multiple denominations ===
- George of Cappadocia (died 361) Arian bishop of Alexandria
- George of Vienne (died c. 670 or c. 699), Archbishop of Vienne
- George of Choziba (died c. 625) Cypriot hegumen
- George the Confessor (died 814), Bishop of Antioch in Pisidia
- George (died 815), Archbishop of Develtos and one of the Martyrs of Adrianople
- George the Standard-Bearer (776–821), Archbishop of Mytilene and iconodule
- George of Amastris (died 825), Bishop of Amastris
- George of Mitilene (753–846) also called George the Younger, Archbishop of Mytilene, brother of Symeon Stylites of Lesbos
- George (died 852), one of the Martyrs of Córdoba
- George of Lodève (died 884), Bishop of Lodève and monk

== Places ==
=== Atlantic and Caribbean islands ===
==== Bermuda ====
- St. George's, Bermuda, an UNESCO World Heritage Site
- St. George's Parish, Bermuda, one of Bermuda's parishes, containing the above town
- St. George's Island, Bermuda, an island of the archipelago of Bermuda, contained within the above parish

==== Grenada ====
- St. George's, Grenada, the capital city of Grenada
- Saint George Parish, Grenada

==== Other Atlantic and Caribbean islands ====
- Saint George, Barbados, a parish
- Saint George Basseterre Parish, Saint Kitts and Nevis
- St. George's Caye, an island in the Caribbean Sea
- Saint George Parish, Antigua and Barbuda
- Saint George Parish, Dominica
- Saint George Parish, Saint Vincent and the Grenadines

=== Australia ===
- Parish of St George, a parish in Sydney
- St George (Sydney), a region of Sydney
- St George, Queensland
- St Georges, South Australia, Adelaide
- Division of St George, proclaimed 1949, abolished 1993, electoral district in New South Wales
- Electoral district of St George, created 1894, abolished 1930, electoral district in New South Wales

=== Canada ===
- St. George (Manitoba provincial electoral district), established 1914, eliminated 1981
- St. George, New Brunswick, a town in Charlotte County
- Saint George Parish, New Brunswick
- St. George's, Newfoundland and Labrador
- St. George's Bay (Newfoundland and Labrador), a bay in Newfoundland and Labrador
- St. George's Bay (Nova Scotia), a bay in Nova Scotia
- St. George, Ontario, a village near Brantford
- St. George station, a subway station in Toronto, Ontario
- St. George (Ontario provincial electoral district), created 1926, abolished 1987
- Saint-Georges, Quebec, a city in the Chaudière-Appalaches region of Quebec

=== Europe ===
==== Romania ====
- Sfântu Gheorghe, a Székely city north of Brașov
- Sfântu Gheorghe, Tulcea, a commune in Tulcea County
- Sfântu Gheorghe, Ialomița, a commune in Ialomița County

==== United Kingdom ====
- St George, Bristol
- St. George, Conwy
- St George Hanover Square, London
- St George in the East, London
- St George in the East (parish), London
- St George, former name of Easton in Gordano, North Somerset
- St. Georges, North Somerset, near Weston-super-Mare
- St George's, Preston, an electoral ward in Preston, Lancashire
- St. George's, Shropshire, part of Telford and a component of St George's and Priorslee civil parish
- St George's Channel, connecting the Irish Sea and the Atlantic Ocean
- Saint George's Hill, Weybridge
- St Georges super Ely and St George's, Vale of Glamorgan, Wales
- St George (London County Council constituency)
- St George (UK Parliament constituency)
- St George's (Southwark ward), London
- St George's Park National Football Centre

==== Other places in Europe ====
- Saint George's Memorial Church, Ypres, Belgium
- St. Georg, Hamburg, a quarter of Hamburg, Germany
- Saint-George, Switzerland

=== The Middle East ===
- Saint George Bay, Beirut, Lebanon
- Saint George Monastery, al-Khader, a Greek Orthodox monastery in al-Khader, West Bank
- St. George's Monastery, Wadi Qelt, an ancient monastery in Waldi Qilt, in the West Bank

=== United States ===
- St. George, Alaska
- St. George's Hundred, Delaware, an unincorporated subdivision of New Castle County
- St. George, Broward County, Florida, a former census-designated place, now a neighborhood of Lauderhill
- St. George, Pinellas County, Florida, a place in Pinellas County, Florida
- St. George Island (Florida) in Franklin County
- Saint George, Georgia
- Saint George, Illinois
- St. George, Kansas
- St. George, Louisiana
- St. George, Maine
- St. George, Minnesota
- St. George Township, Benton County, Minnesota
- St. George, Missouri
- St. George, Wright County, Missouri
- St. George, Staten Island, New York
- St. George, South Carolina
- St. George, Utah
- St. George, Vermont, a New England town
  - St. George (CDP), Vermont, a census-designated place within the town
- Saint George, Virginia
- St. George, West Virginia

=== Other places ===
- St Georges Strand, a coastal village near Port Elizabeth, South Africa
- Saint George's Channel (Papua New Guinea)
- Saint George Fjord, Greenland
- São Jorge do Ivaí, a municipality in the state of Paraná, Brazil

== Arts and media ==
- St George (advertisement), a commercial for the UK soft drink Blackcurrant Tango
- Saint George (Donatello), a c. 1415–1417 sculpture by Donatello
- Saint George (film), a 2016 Portuguese film
- Saint George (icon, 1130), a Russian Saint George icon
- Saint George (TV series), an American television comedy

== Businesses and organizations ==
=== Schools ===
- City St George's, University of London, England
  - St George's, University of London
- University of Toronto St. George, one of the three University of Toronto campuses, Canada
- St George's School, Edinburgh, Scotland
- St. George's School (Rhode Island)
- St. George's Girls' School (Penang, Malaysia)
- St. George's University, Grenada

=== Sports clubs ===
- Birmingham St George's F.C., a defunct English association football club
- Saint George S.C., an Ethiopian association football club
- St George FC, an Australian association football club
- St Georges A.F.C., an association football club in Douglas, Isle of Man
- St. George Dragons, an Australian rugby league club
- St George AFC, an Australian Rules Football club based in Sydney, Australia
- St. George Illawarra Dragons, Australian Rugby League team in the NRL
- St. George's F.C., a Maltese association football club

=== Other businesses ===
- St. George Bank, an Australian bank
- St George's Distillery, a distillery in England
- St. George Records, a record label
- St. George Spirits, a distillery in California, US

== Honors ==
- Cross of St. George, a military honor in Russia
- Order of Saint George (Russia), a military honor in Russia
- Ribbon of Saint George, a Russian patriotic ribbon
- Sacred Military Constantinian Order of Saint George, a Roman Catholic order of chivalry

== Other uses ==
- St. George (name), a given name and surname of several people
- Saint George the Victorious (coin), a Russian coin
- St. George Defence, an uncommon chess opening
- Saint George's Day, the feast day of Saint George
- St. George's mushroom or Calocybe gambosa
- St George's Park National Football Centre, England

== See also ==
- Agios Georgios (disambiguation)
- Battle of Cape St. George, a naval battle of the Pacific campaign of World War II
- Battle of St. George's Caye, a 1798 battle during Anglo-Spanish War
- Order of Saint George (disambiguation)
- Reial Acadèmia Catalana de Belles Arts de Sant Jordi, Spain
- Russian battleship Georgii Pobedonosets ("Saint George the victorious"), an 1892 Russian battleship involved in the Potemkin mutiny
- Georgy Pobedonosets, a Ropucha-class landing ship in the Russian Navy
- Saint George and the Dragon
- St. George Island (disambiguation)
- Saint George Parish (disambiguation)
- St George's Castle (disambiguation)
- St. George's Cathedral (disambiguation)
- St George's Church (disambiguation)
- St. George's College (disambiguation)
- St George's Cross subway station, an underground station in Glasgow, Scotland
- St. George's Episcopal Church (disambiguation)
- St George's Hospital (disambiguation)
- St. George's School (disambiguation)
- Saint-Georges (disambiguation)
- San Giorgio (disambiguation)
- San Jorge (disambiguation)
- Sankt Georgen (disambiguation)
- São Jorge (disambiguation)
- Szentgyörgymező
