= Saint George Parish =

Saint George Parish or Saint George's Parish may refer to:

- Saint George (Tobago) (a parish)
- Saint George Parish, Antigua and Barbuda, a parish of Antigua and Barbuda
- Saint George Parish, Barbados, a parish of Barbados
- St. George's Parish, Bermuda, a parish of Bermuda
- St. George Parish, Cumberland, a parish in New South Wales, Australia
- Saint George Parish, Dominica, a parish of Dominica
- Saint George Parish, Grenada, a parish of Grenada
- Saint Georges Parish, Montserrat, a parish of Montserrat
- St. George's Parish, Prince Edward Island, a parish in Prince Edward Island, Canada
- Saint George Parish, New Brunswick, a parish in New Brunswick, Canada
- St George's Church (Ottawa), a parish in Ottawa, Canada
- Saint George Parish, Saint Vincent and the Grenadines, a parish of Saint Vincent and the Grenadines
- The colonial name for Burke County, Georgia
- Saint George Parish (Bridgeport, Connecticut), United States

== See also ==
- Saint George (disambiguation)
