= Knights of St. George =

Knights of St. George may refer to:

Chivalric orders:

- Order of Saint George, A European Order of the House of Habsburg-Lothringen
- Order of Sant Jordi d'Alfama, founded by King Peter II of Aragon in 1201, amalgamated with the Order of Montesa in 1400
- Order of Saint George (Kingdom of Hungary), established by King Charles of Hungary in 1326
- Order of the Garter, founded by King Edward III of England in 1348, meets annually at St. George's Chapel, Windsor Castle
- Sacred Military Constantinian Order of Saint George, a Roman Catholic order legendarily founded by Constantine the Great, actually established between 1520 and 1545
- Old Order of Saint George, named Order of the Four Emperors, established by Count Philipp Ferdinand of Limburg-Stirum in 1768

Orders of merit:

- Royal Order of Saint George for the Defense of the Immaculate Conception, founded by Elector Maximilian II Emanuel of Bavaria in 1726
- Order of St. George, founded by Catherine the Great of Russia in 1769
- Order of St Michael and St George, founded by Prince Regent George IV of the United Kingdom in 1818
- Order of St. George (Hanover), founded by King Ernest Augustus I of Hanover in 1839
- Order of Saints George and Constantine, founded by King George II of Greece in 1936
- George Cross and George Medal, founded by King George VI of the United Kingdom in 1940

== See also ==
- Order of St. George (disambiguation)
