= Church of San Jorge (Manzaneda) =

Coordinates: 43°36′22″N 5°52′33″W

Iglesia de San Jorge (Manzaneda)
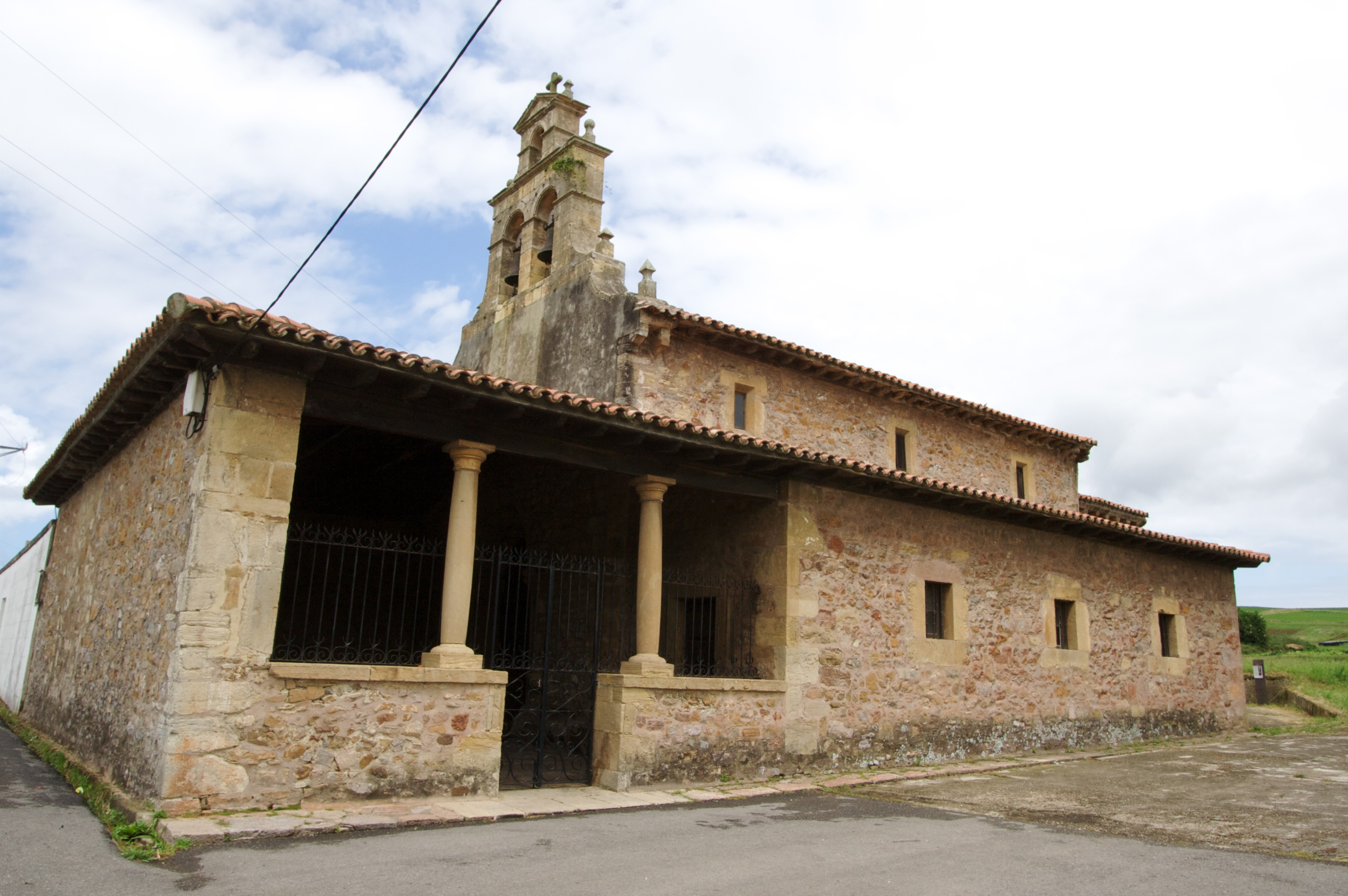
- Iglesia de San Jorge (Manzaneda)
- Location: Manzaneda, Gozón, Asturias
- Country: Spain

The Church of San Jorge of Manzaneda (Spanish: la iglesia de San Jorge de Manzaneda) is a church in Gozón, Spain. It is small in size, but it constitutes a notable example of Asturian Romanesque architecture. It was created during the classical period in the late 12th and early 13th centuries. It is significant for its architecture and its surrounding environment, which has barely changed.

== Architecture ==
Located next to the town Alvaré, in the parish of Gozoniega de Manzaneda, it maintains an area close to the standard measurements for the rural, Romanesque churches of Asturias. It has a singular rectangular nave with no divisions of sections or side chapels. The front of the building has two areas, one inspired by local tradition, and the other has international Roman themes.

Other elements that link the church to the Romanesque are the decorative portions located in various spaces of the temple. The church includes zigzag motifs, a large arch with limited iconographic art, and corbels with human and animal images present in its apse. There are traits that bind the local construction with the simplicity of the church, because there was a scarcity of resources during the construction. It was built using mostly Sillarejo masonry. The rough and irregular walls connect to the decorative elements of local tradition.

The ceiling combines elements of worship that were once popular. A wooden frame surrounds the nave. At the head of the church there is an arch and a barrel vaulted ceiling, behind which is a hemicycle. Historical data on the church is very scarce; there are no documents detailing the construction in spite of its undoubtedly antiquity. Its history is linked to the nearby Palace of Manzaneda. The Palace of Manzaneda is a building from the 17th century, which was developed around a great late medieval tower.

== History ==
The absence of epigraphic documents makes it difficult to date when the building was created; however, it has been concluded that the building was built between the end of the 12th century and the beginning of the 13th century. This was concluded because of the plentiful Asturian Romanesque influence.

The original work has undergone various altercations throughout history, although it is thought to maintain similar dimensions to the original. Small changes were executed over the past centuries, including the addition of a window in the south apse, the closure of a gateway to the south, and the addition of the bell gable in 1774.

The church was burned down during a civil war in 1936, ruining much of the church's content. A great restoration was carried out between 1942 and 1950. In the restoration, they modified the upper parts of the walls in the nave and got rid of the corbels that existed in that area.

== See also ==
- Asturian art
- Catholic Church in Spain
