= Santolaya =

Santolaya may refer to:

- Santolaya de Vixil, a parish in the municipality of Siero, Spain
- Santolaya (Cabranes), a parish in the municipality of Cabranes, Spain
- Santolaya, Gozón, a parish in the municipality of Gozón, Spain
- Santolaya (Morcín), a parish in the municipality of Morcín, Spain
