= Fort St. George (disambiguation) =

Fort St. George or Fort Saint George may refer to:

- Fort St. George, India, a fortress in Chennai(Madras), India
  - Fort St George in England, a pub in Cambridge, England, named for the Chennai fort(Madras fort)
- Fort St. George, a 1607 fort of the Popham Colony in Maine
- Fort St. George (Thomaston, Maine), a 1719 British Colonial fort in Maine, U.S.
- HMAT Wandilla, a ship formerly named Fort St George

== See also ==
- Fort George (disambiguation)
- Saint George (disambiguation)
