= Saint-Martin-des-Bois =

- Commune
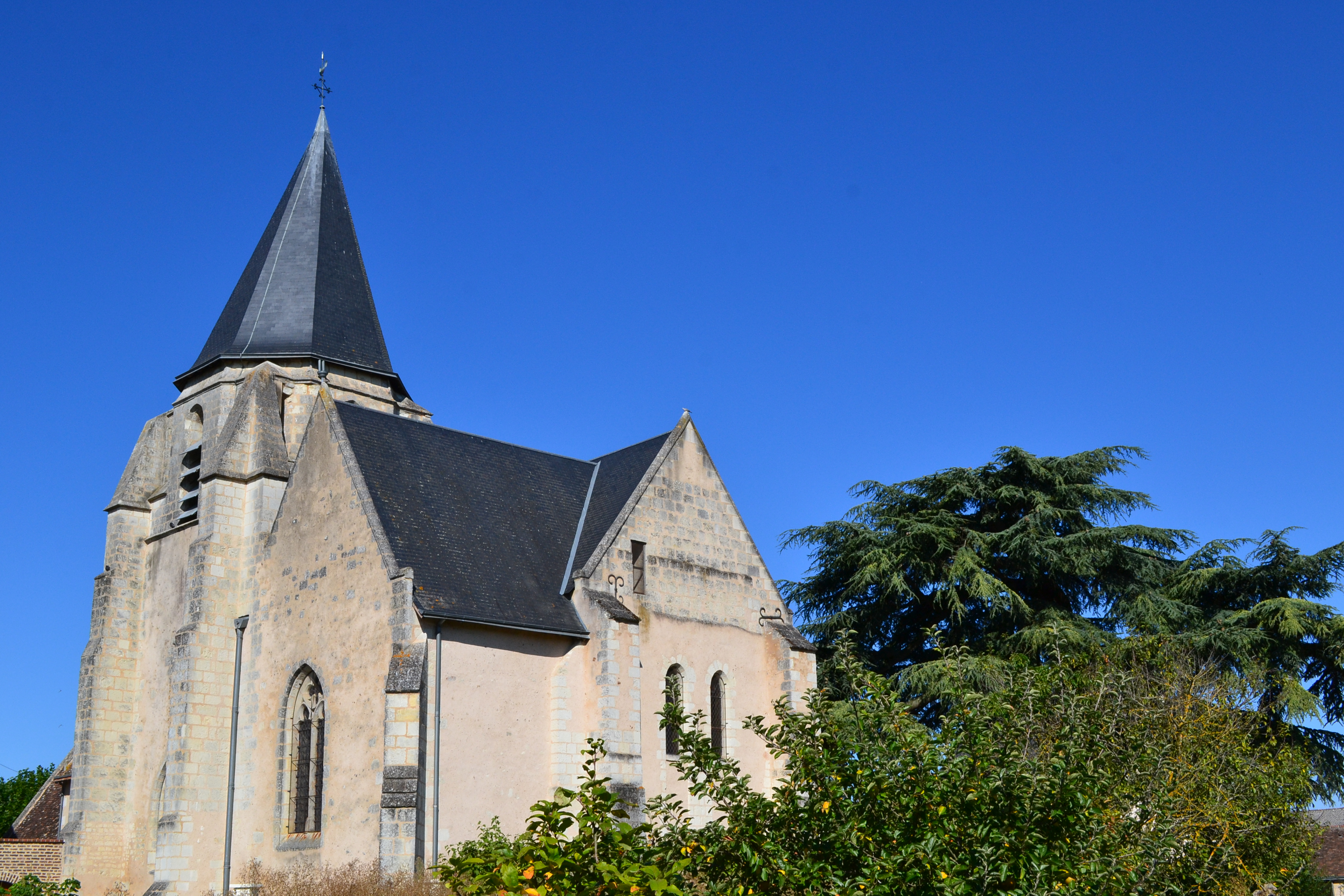
- Church of Saint-Martin

- Coat of arms
- Location of Saint-Martin-des-Bois
- Location within France Location within Centre-Val de Loire
- Coordinates: 47°43′24″N 0°49′41″E
- Country: France
- Region: Centre-Val de Loire
- Department: Loir-et-Cher
- Arrondissement: Vendôme
- Canton: Montoire-sur-le-Loir
- Intercommunality: CA Territoires Vendômois

Government
  - Mayor (2020–2026): David Corbeau
- Area^{1}: 36.4 km^{2} (14.1 sq mi)
- Highest elevation: 156 m (512 ft)
- Lowest elevation: 60 m (200 ft)
- Population (2023): 582
  - Density: 16.0/km^{2} (41.4/sq mi)
- Time zone: UTC+01:00 (CET)
  - Summer (DST): UTC+02:00 (CEST)
- INSEE/Postal code: 41225 /41800
- ^{1} French Land Register data, which excludes lakes, ponds, glaciers > 1 km^{2} (0.386 sq mi or 247 acres) and river estuaries.

Saint-Martin-des-Bois (French pronunciation: [sɛ̃ maʁtɛ̃ de bwa]) is a commune in the Loir-et-Cher department of central France.

== Population ==
Historical population
Year	Pop.	±% p.a.
1968	755	—
1975	686	−1.36%
1982	603	−1.83%
1990	597	−0.12%
1999	589	−0.15%
2007	596	+0.15%
2012	633	+1.21%
2017	579	−1.77%
2023	582	+0.09%
Source: INSEE

== Sights ==
The Benedictine Abbey of Saint-Georges-du-Bois is adjacent to the village centre. The historic church of St. Martin possesses an open narthex.

== See also ==
- Communes of the Loir-et-Cher department
- Saint-Martin-du-Bois (disambiguation)
