= Saint-Georges-du-Bois =

Saint-Georges-du-Bois may refer to the following places in France:

- Saint-Georges-du-Bois, Charente-Maritime, a commune in the Charente-Maritime department
- Saint-Georges-du-Bois, Maine-et-Loire, a commune in the Maine-et-Loire department
- Saint-Georges-du-Bois, Sarthe, a commune in the Sarthe department
- Abbey of Saint-Georges-du-Bois, a Benedictine monastery in Saint-Martin-des-Bois in the Loir-et-Cher department
