= St. George's Grammar School =

St. George's Grammar School may refer to:

- St. George's Grammar School (Cape Town)
- St. George's Grammar School (Hyderabad)

== See also ==
- St. George's School (disambiguation)
