= St George's Castle =

St George's Castle, or variants, may refer to:

- Castello di San Giorgio, Mantua, part of the Ducal palace, Mantua, Lombardy, Italy
- São Jorge Castle, Lisbon, Portugal
- Castle of San Jorge, Seville, Spain
- Castle of Saint George, Cephalonia, Greece
- St. George's Castle, Preveza, Greece
- Castle of Saint George, on Mount Pindo

== See also ==
- Saint George (disambiguation)
- Fort St. George (disambiguation)
- St George's Chapel, Windsor Castle
- Elmina Castle, the Castelo de São Jorge da Mina ('Castle of St. George of the Mine'), Elmina, Ghana
