= Order of Saint George =

Order of Saint George or Order of St. George may refer to:

== Orders of chivalry ==
- Order of Saint George of Alfama, a chivalric order of the Crown of Aragon based in the Principality of Catalonia, founded in 1201 by King Peter II and later amalgamated with the Order of Montesa
- Order of Saint George (Kingdom of Hungary), a secular chivalric order of the Kingdom of Hungary founded in 1326 by King Charles I and currently known as the International Order of Saint George
- Order of Saint George (House of Habsburg), a chivalric order of the Holy Roman Empire founded in 1469 by Emperor Frederick III
- Sacred Military Constantinian Order of Saint George, a Catholic order of chivalry founded around 1545 by the Angelo Flavio Comneno family and currently awarded by the House of Bourbon-Two Sicilies
  - Sacred Angelic Imperial Constantinian Order of Saint George, a related chivalric order currently awarded by the House of Bourbon-Parma
- Royal Order of Saint George for the Defense of the Immaculate Conception, a chivalric order of the Kingdom of Bavaria founded in 1726 by Elector Maximilian II Emanuel and currently awarded by the House of Wittelsbach
- Ancient Order of Saint George, a Christian order of chivalry founded in 1768 by Count Philipp Ferdinand of Limburg-Stirum, which was revived in 1926
- Order of Saint George of the Reunion, a chivalric order of the Kingdom of the Two Sicilies founded in 1819 by King Ferdinand I and currently awarded by the Duke of Castro's branch of the House of Bourbon-Two Sicilies
- Order of Saint George (Hanover), a chivalric order of the Kingdom of Hanover founded in 1839 by King Ernest Augustus and currently awarded by the House of Hanover
- Order of Saint George (Habsburg-Lorraine), a dynastic order of chivalry founded in 2008 by the House of Habsburg-Lorraine
- Order of Saint George (Russia)

=== Referring to Saint George and another saint ===
- Order of St Michael and St George, a chivalric order of the United Kingdom founded in 1818 by George, Prince Regent (later King George IV)
- Order of Saints George and Constantine, a chivalric order of the Kingdom of Greece founded in 1936 by King George II and currently awarded by the Greek Royal Family

== Orders of merit ==
- Saint George's Order of Victory, an order of merit of the Republic of Georgia founded in 2004
- Royal Military Order of St George, a military order of merit of the Kingdom of Tonga founded in 2009 by King George Tupou V

== Other ==
- Order of Saint George (Fabergé egg), an enameled Easter egg made in 1916
- Order of St George (horse), an Irish thoroughbred racehorse
- Order of Saint George medallion, an award of the United States Armor Association

== See also ==
- Cross of Saint George (Russia), a state decoration of the Russian Federation
- Order of the Garter, which has Saint George as its patron
- Royal Society of St George, an English patriotic society established in 1894
- Saint George (disambiguation)
