= Llaviana, Gozón =

Llaviana
- Parish
- Location within Spain
- Country: Spain
- Autonomous community: Asturias
- Province: Asturias
- Municipality: Gozón

Llaviana is one of thirteen parishes (administrative divisions) in the Gozón municipality, within the province and autonomous community of Asturias, in northern Spain.

The population is 530 (INE 2008).

== Villages and hamlets ==
- El Campo la Ilesia
- El Poblao
- Nieva
- Zeluán

=== Other populated places ===
- Canal
- Canal de Riba
- El Barrio Baxo
- El Campo'l Ferreru
- El Cantu Reguera
- El Puiblu
- Folgueres
- Iboya Riba
- L'Arañón
- La Bargaña
- La Berguería
- La Braña
- La Corona
- La Cueva
- La Fonte
- La Indiana
- Les Cases de Cirvión
- Les Cases de la Chueta
- Llodero
- Llodero de Baxo
- Los Rebancos de la Güelga
- Moniello
- Pumarín
- Samalandrán
- San Xuan
