= Verdicio =

- Parish
- Location within Spain
- Coordinates: 43°37′27″N 5°51′37″W
- Country: Spain
- Autonomous community: Asturias
- Province: Asturias
- Municipality: Gozón

Verdicio is one of thirteen parishes (administrative divisions) in the Gozón municipality, within the province and autonomous community of Asturias, in northern Spain.

== Villages and hamlets ==
- Camporrundio
- Les Cabañes
- Fiame
- Ovies

=== Other populated places ===
- Budores
- Cebales
- El Pibidal
- Entragua
- Figuera
- Güeda
- L'Alcabián
- La Carreña
- La Casa Máquines
- La Corona
- La Corva
- La Cárcova
- La Lloba
- La Llunguera
- La Pedregosa
- Los Cuetos
- Los Troncones
- Restelles
- Rondiella
