= Bañugues =

- Parish
- Location within Spain
- Coordinates: 43°38′00″N 5°49′00″W
- Country: Spain
- Autonomous community: Asturias
- Province: Asturias
- Municipality: Gozón

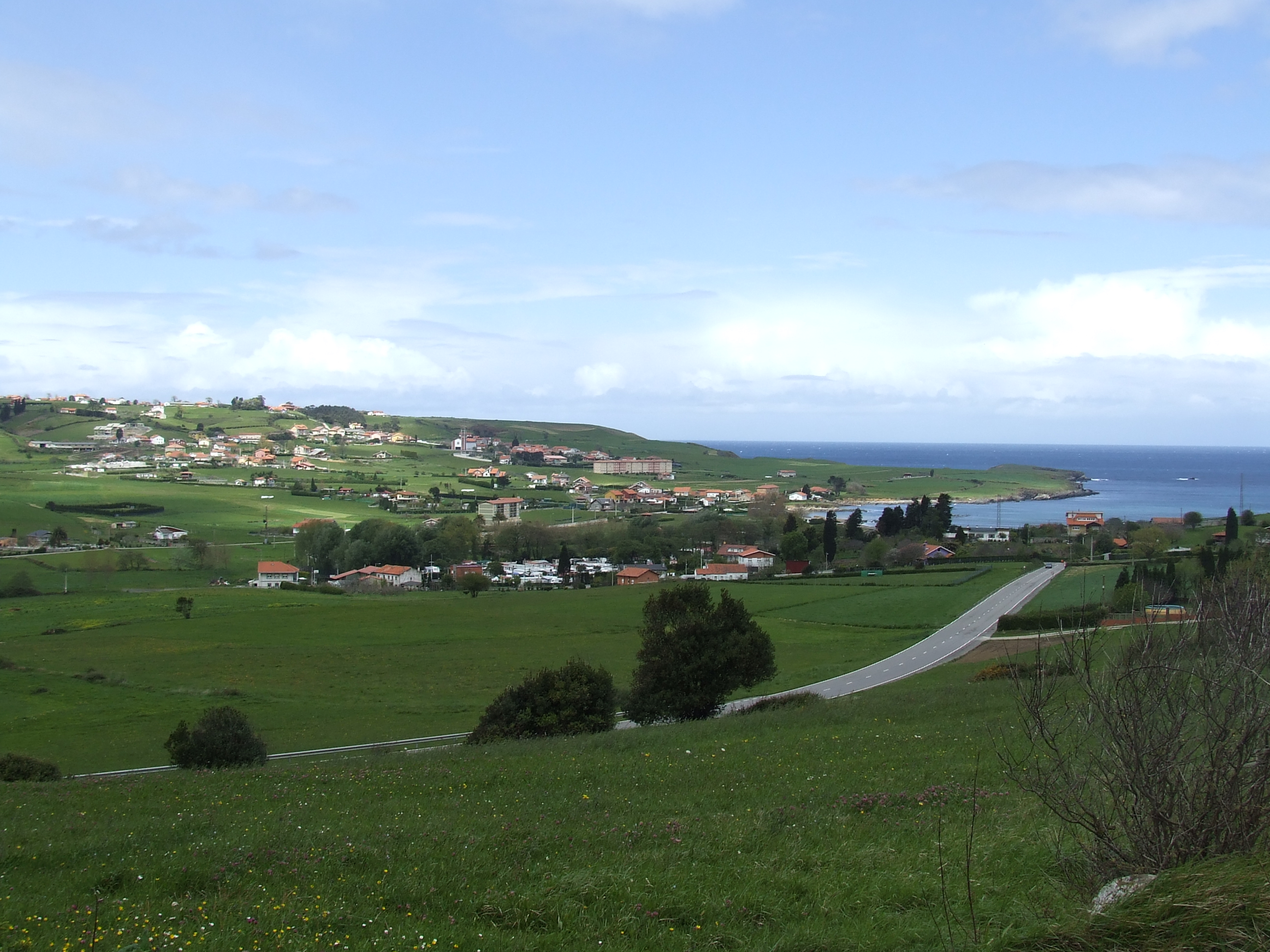
Bañugues

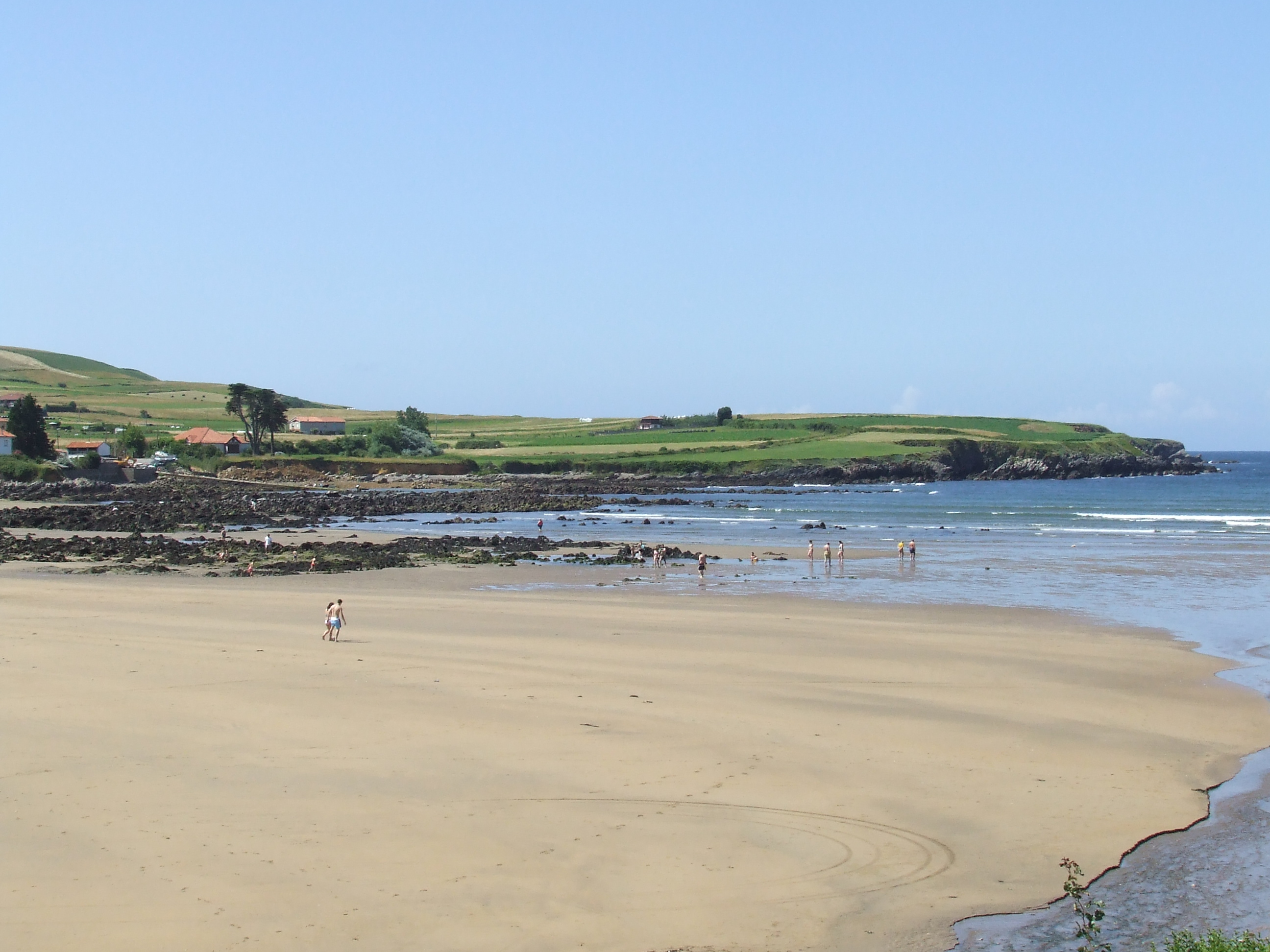
Bañugues beach

Bañugues is one of thirteen parishes (administrative divisions) in the Gozón municipality, within the province and autonomous community of Asturias, in northern Spain, near "Peñas" cape.

The population is 647 (INE 2007).

== Villages and hamlets ==
- Cerín
- El Monte
- La Ribera
- El Llugar
- La Quintana

=== Other populated places ===
- Biforco
- El Campo Bartuelo
- El Canterín
- El Llagar
- El Molín de l'Arena
- El Rucao
- El Veyu
- La Espina
- La Panadería
- La Ribera
- Les Cases de la Mina
- Les Vegues
- Llumeres
- Los Campos
- Xelaz
