= Cardo (Gozón) =

- Parish
- Location within Spain
- Coordinates: 43.583333°N 5.833333°W
- Country: Spain
- Autonomous community: Asturias
- Province: Asturias
- Municipality: Gozón

Cardo is one of thirteen parishes (administrative divisions) in the Gozón municipality, within the province and autonomous community of Asturias, in northern Spain.

== Villages and hamlets ==
- La Iría
- La Ren
- Romadonga
- San Zabornín

=== Other populated places ===
- El Bogalín
- El Camonal
- El Cellero
- El Mofeo
- El Posadorio
- El Reguero
- El Torial
- La Calzonera
- La Carbayeda
- La Cerezal
- La Garcivil
- La Granda
- La Llantada
- La Llonguera
- La Pedrera
- La Trapa
- La Uz
- La Vega
- Les Chibeles
- Los Piñuecos
