= Santiao d'Ambiedes =

- Parish
- Location within Spain
- Coordinates: 43.583333°N 5.883333°W
- Country: Spain
- Autonomous community: Asturias
- Province: Asturias
- Municipality: Gozón

Santiao d'Ambiedes is one of thirteen parishes (administrative divisions) in the Gozón municipality, within the province and autonomous community of Asturias, in northern Spain.

The population is 1,007.

== Villages and hamlets ==
- Barreo
- El Valle
- Iboya
- La Piñera
- Perdones
- Vardasquera
