= Vioño =

- Parish
- Location within Spain
- Coordinates: 43.6°N 5.85°W
- Country: Spain
- Autonomous community: Asturias
- Province: Asturias
- Municipality: Gozón

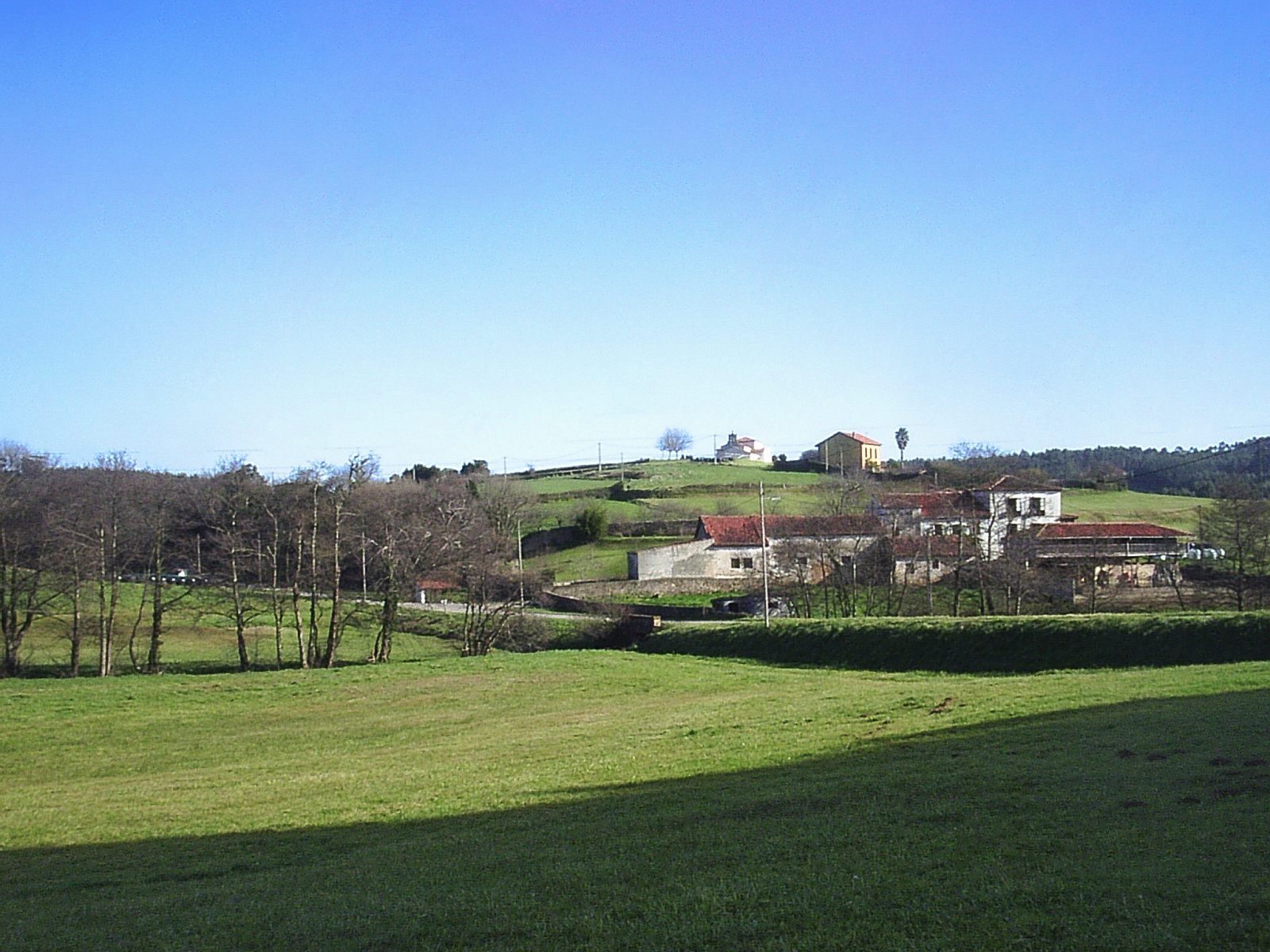
Vioño

Vioño is one of thirteen parishes (administrative divisions) in the Gozón municipality, within the province and autonomous community of Asturias, in northern Spain.

The population is 172 (INE 2006).

== Villages and hamlets ==
- La Cabrera
- La Pedrera
- Vioño

=== Other populated places ===
- Arispol
- Cariello
- El Borial
- El Fondo
- El Maroyo
- El Mofeo
- L'Escayal
- La Morana
- La Ponte
- Villarréi
