= St. George (name) =

This is a list of people with the name St. George (or Saint George). For saints called George and other uses, see Saint George (disambiguation).

== Surname ==
- St George (surname)
- George Saint-George (1841–1924), British musical instrument maker and composer
- Henry Saint-George (1866–1917), British violinist and writer about the violin, son of George Saint-George

== Forename ==
- St George Ashe, Church of Ireland bishop
- Saint-George Ashe, oarsman
- St George Caulfeild, Irish MP
- St George Daly, Irish MP
- Denis St. George Daly, polo player
- St George Lowther, 4th Earl of Lonsdale
- St. George Jackson Mivart, 19th century British biologist
- St George Richardson, Irish MP
- St. George Tucker, US lawyer
- Tudor St. George Tucker, Australian painter
- St George Gore-St George, Irish baronet
- St George St George, 1st Baron St George
- Murray Seafield St George Head, English actor and singer

== Fictional characters ==
- Charlie St. George, a character in the Netflix series 13 Reasons Why
- Joe and Selena St. George, characters in the 1992 Stephen King novel Dolores Claiborne and its 1995 film adaptation

== See also ==
- St George Baronets
- Baron St George
