= São Jorge =

São Jorge (European Portuguese: [sɐ̃w ˈʒɔɾʒɨ]), Portuguese for Saint George, may refer to the following places:

== Brazil ==
- São Jorge, Alto Paraíso de Goiás, is a village in the State of Goiás
- São Jorge d'Oeste, a municipality in the state of Paraná
- São Jorge, Rio Grande do Sul, is a municipality in the State of Rio Grande do Sul
- São Jorge, São Paulo, is a bairro (neighbourhood) in the city of São Paulo

== Cape Verde ==
- São Jorge, Cape Verde, a village in the municipality of São Filipe, Fogo
- São Jorge (Santiago), a settlement in the municipality of São Lourenço dos Órgãos, Santiago

== Ghana ==
- São Jorge da Mina, present-day Elmina, Ghana (formerly the Gold Coast)

== Portugal ==
- Caldas de São Jorge, town in the civil parish of São Jorge, in the municipality of Santa Maria da Feira
- Castle of São Jorge, a Moorish castle located in the center of Lisbon
- São Jorge (Arcos de Valdevez), a civil parish in the municipality of Arcos de Valdevez
- São Jorge de Arroios, a civil parish within the city of Lisbon
- São Jorge da Beira, a civil parish in the municipality of Covilhã
- São Jorge do Selho, a civil parish in the municipality of Guimarães
- São Jorge de Vizela, a civil parish within the city of Vizela

In the Azores:

- São Jorge Island, an island in the Central Group

In Madeira:

- Arco de São Jorge, a civil parish in the municipality of Santana
- São Jorge (Santana), a civil parish in the municipality of Santana

== Mozambique ==
- Goa Island, also known as Ilha São Jorge

== See also ==
- Saint George (disambiguation) - English
