= Viodo =

Parish in Asturias, Spain

- Parish
- Location within Spain
- Coordinates: 43.633333°N 5.833333°W
- Country: Spain
- Autonomous community: Asturias
- Province: Asturias
- Municipality: Gozón

Viodo is a parish in the municipality of Gozón, within the province and autonomous community of Asturias, northern Spain.

== Villages and hamlets ==
- El Ferriru
- Peñes
- Viodo

=== Other populated places ===
- Bocal
- Carbayeda
- Coneo
- L'Amedal
- La Cai
- La Corva
- La Gaviera
- Les Cases de la Corredoria
- Les Escueles
- Les Talayes
- Llumeres
- Los Abanales
- Paraxo
- Tezán
