= Bocines =

- Parish
- Location within Spain
- Coordinates: 43.6°N 5.8°W
- Country: Spain
- Autonomous community: Asturias
- Province: Asturias
- Municipality: Gozón

Bocines is one of thirteen parishes (administrative divisions) in the Gozón municipality, within the province and autonomous community of Asturias, in northern Spain.

== Villages and hamlets ==
- Antromero
- Condres
- Salines

=== Other populated places ===
- Cabornio
- Cañeo
- Cuixo
- El Fontán
- El Picudel
- El Rebuñón
- El Rumión
- Fumayor
- L'Alto'l Monte
- La Cardina
- La Colgada
- La Flor
- La Frana
- La Frontera
- La Gallega
- La Granda
- La Iría
- La Paxarada
- La Rodil
- La Rubina
- La Sierra
- La Viesca
- Les Moranes
- Les Quintanes
- Mori
- Parrielles
