= La Perche =

- Commune
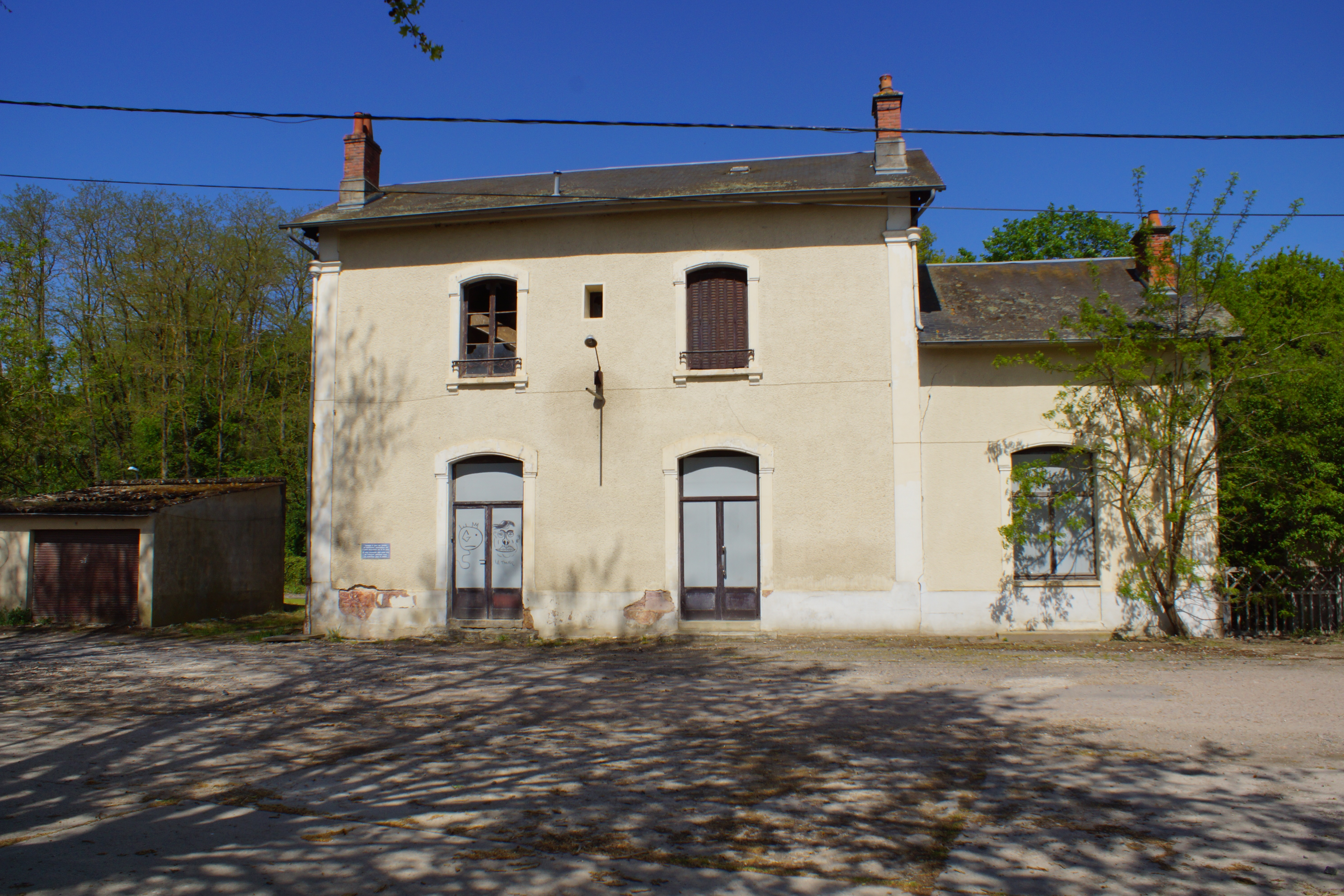
- Town hall

- Coat of arms
- Location of La Perche
- Location within France Location within Centre-Val de Loire
- Coordinates: 46°38′44″N 2°34′28″E
- Country: France
- Region: Centre-Val de Loire
- Department: Cher
- Arrondissement: Saint-Amand-Montrond
- Canton: Châteaumeillant

Government
  - Mayor (2023–2026): Michel Marquis
- Area^{1}: 10.45 km^{2} (4.03 sq mi)
- Elevation: 167 m (548 ft)
- Highest elevation: 221 m (725 ft)
- Lowest elevation: 158 m (518 ft)
- Population (2023): 205
  - Density: 19.6/km^{2} (50.8/sq mi)
- Time zone: UTC+01:00 (CET)
  - Summer (DST): UTC+02:00 (CEST)
- INSEE/Postal code: 18178 /18200
- ^{1} French Land Register data, which excludes lakes, ponds, glaciers > 1 km^{2} (0.386 sq mi or 247 acres) and river estuaries.

La Perche (French pronunciation: [la pɛʁʃ]) is a commune in the Cher department in the Centre-Val de Loire region of France.

== Geography ==
A farming area comprising a village and a few hamlets situated on the western bank of the river Cher, some 32 miles (51 km) south of Bourges, at the junction of the D62 and the D118 roads. The commune borders on the department of Allier.

== Population ==
Historical population
Year	Pop.	±% p.a.
1968	328	—
1975	281	−2.19%
1982	232	−2.70%
1990	247	+0.79%
1999	245	−0.09%
2007	251	+0.30%
2012	242	−0.73%
2017	205	−3.26%
2023	205	+0.00%
Source: INSEE

== Sights ==
- The church of St. Jean, dating from the thirteenth century.

== See also ==
- Communes of the Cher department
- Le Perche (ancient region in Normandy)
