= Eres, Gozón =

Coordinates: 43.616667°N 5.816667°W

Eres
- Parish
- Interactive map of Eres
- Country: Spain
- Autonomous community: Asturias
- Province: Asturias
- Municipality: Gozón

Eres is one of thirteen parishes (administrative divisions) in the Gozón municipality, within the province and autonomous community of Asturias, in northern Spain.

== Villages and hamlets ==
- Eres
- La Cabaña
- Villanueva
- Xelaz

=== Other populated places ===
- Balbín
- Barreo
- Cueto
- El Molín de Villabona
- El Molín de Viñes
- El Molín de los Praos
- El Molín de l'Arena
- El Pozón
- El Vayón
- Fombona
- La Casona
- La Corona
- La Espina
- La Foz
- La Iría
- La Piñera
- Les Espandes
- Los Morales
- Recaxada
- Vallina
- Viñes
- Zalceda
