= Fort George =

Fort George may refer to:

== Forts ==
=== Bermuda ===
- Fort George, Bermuda, built in the late 18th Century and successively developed through the 19th Century, on a site that had been in use as a watch and signal station since 1612

=== British Virgin Islands ===
- Fort George, Tortola, a fort built at the time of the American Revolution

=== Canada ===
- Fort George, Ontario, a 19th-century fort in Niagara-on-the-Lake, Ontario
- Fort George, Nova Scotia, a.k.a. Halifax Citadel National Historic Site in Halifax, Nova Scotia
- Fort George, A townsite later amalgamated into Prince George, British Columbia
  - Fort George (electoral district), a provincial electoral district centered on the town of Prince George, British Columbia
  - South Fort George, a suburb of Prince George, British Columbia, once its own townsite.
  - Regional District of Fraser–Fort George, British Columbia
- Fort George, a Hudson's Bay Company post near Chisasibi, Quebec
- Fort George, a Hudson's Bay Company post at the mouth of the George River at present-day Kangiqsualujjuaq, Quebec
- Fort George, a North West Company post near Buckingham House, Alberta

=== Cayman Islands ===
- Fort George, George Town, a heritage site on Grand Cayman

=== Croatia ===
- Fort George, a fort on the Island of Vis built in 1812 to protect the harbour and town of Vis (town).

=== French Polynesia ===
- A fort in Tubuai built and then abandoned in 1789 by the Bounty mutineers

=== Grenada ===
- Fort George, an eighteenth-century fort in the capital, St. George's, Grenada

=== Guernsey, Channel Islands ===
- Fort George, Guernsey, the garrison fort of St Peter Port, Guernsey, constructed from 1780 to 1812

=== India ===
- Fort George, Bombay, an extension built to the fortified walls of Bombay

=== Jamaica ===
- Fort George, Jamaica, an eighteenth-century fort in Port Antonio

=== United Kingdom ===
- Fort George, Highland, a fortified garrison constructed from 1748 near Inverness, Scotland
  - Fort George railway station, a former station nearby at Ardersier

=== United States ===
- Fort George, a frontier trading post in Colorado, also known as Fort Saint Vrain
- Fort George (Pensacola, Florida), a former American Revolutionary War fort in Pensacola, Florida
- Fort George (Brunswick, Maine), (1715–1737)
- Fort George (Castine, Maine), (1779), a British fort in the American Revolution and War of 1812
- Fort George, former name of Fort Holmes on Mackinac Island, Michigan
- Fort George, a sub-neighborhood in the extreme northern part of Washington Heights, Manhattan, New York City
- Fort Amsterdam, a British fort in New York City during the American Revolution, also known as Fort George
- Fort George, New York, five different forts in various parts of New York State, built at various times
- Fort George, Oregon, the new name for Fort Astoria after the North West Company purchased it from the Pacific Fur Company in 1813
- Fort George, former name of Fort Wolcott on Goat Island, Rhode Island
- Fort George (Virginia), a 1728 fort on the site of a 1632 fort at or near the later Fort Monroe

== Others ==
- Fort George (Belize House constituency), Belize
- Fort George Brewery, brewery in Astoria, Oregon
- RFA Fort George (A388), combined fleet stores ship and tanker of the Royal Fleet Auxiliary
