= Bartolomé House =

Former health facility on Winter Street, Sheffield

Bartolomé House (formerly Winter Street Hospital and then St George's Hospital)
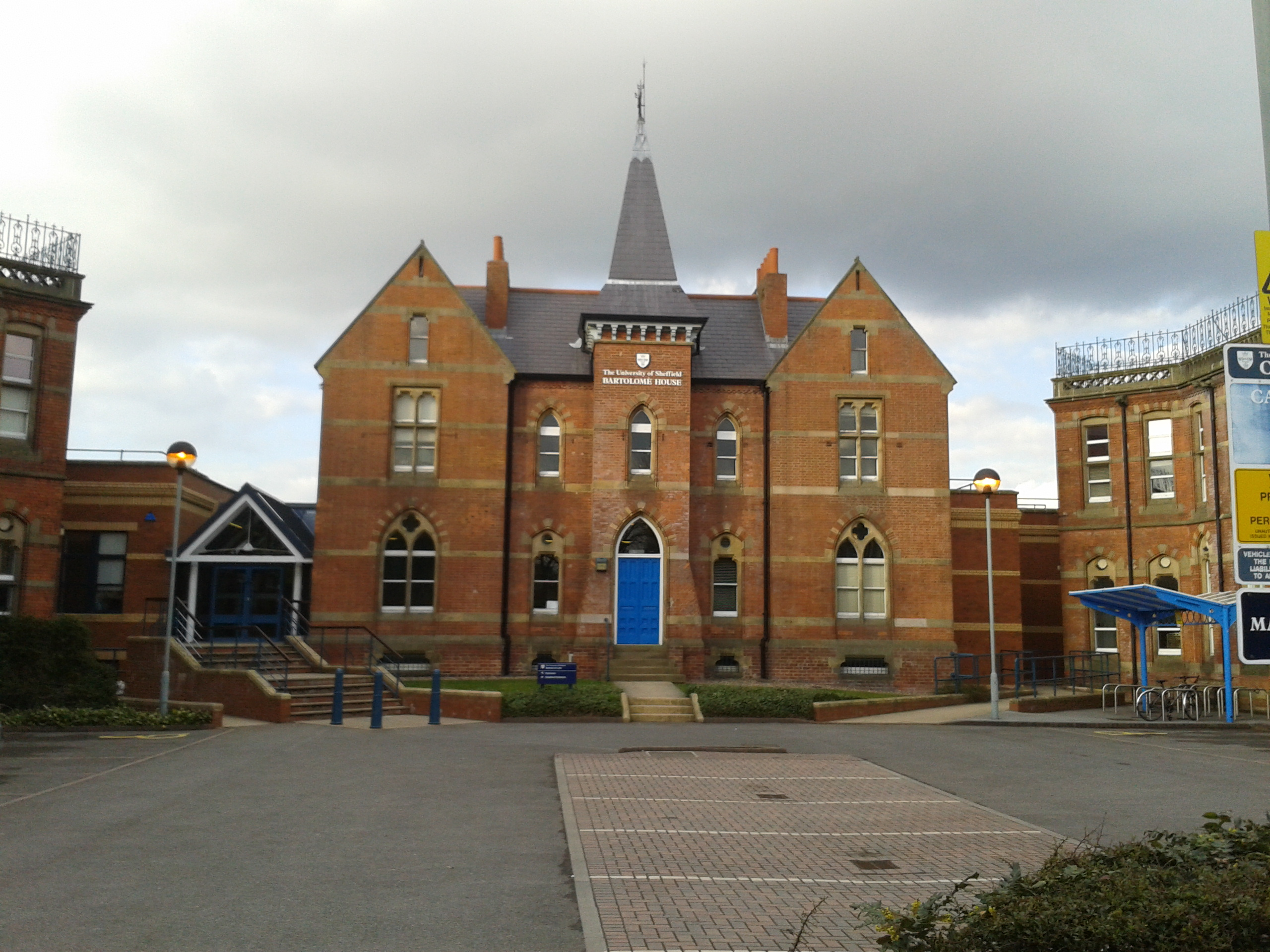
- Central block

- Shown in South Yorkshire

Geography
- Location: Winter Street, Sheffield, South Yorkshire, England
- Coordinates: 53.3842°N 1.4888°W

Organisation
- Care system: NHS

Services
- Emergency department: No

History
- Founded: 1881
- Closed: 1990

Links
- Lists: Hospitals in England

Bartolomé House, formerly Winter Street Hospital and then St George's Hospital, is former health facility on Winter Street, Sheffield. The facilities, which are Grade II listed buildings, now house the School of Law at the University of Sheffield.

== History ==
The building was designed by S. L. Swann in Gothic Revival style in red brick with ashlar dressings and slate roofs. Originally constructed in 1881 as the Winter Street Hospital for Infectious Diseases, it became a dedicated tuberculosis hospital in 1912, and was later the St George's Hospital for geriatric patients, which closed in 1990. After refurbishment it became the School of Nursing for the University of Sheffield in 1997.

It was named Bartolomé House in 1998 after Dr Mariano Martin de Bartolomé, who was president of the Sheffield Medical School for 22 years in the 19th century. In 2008 it was taken over by the School of Law.

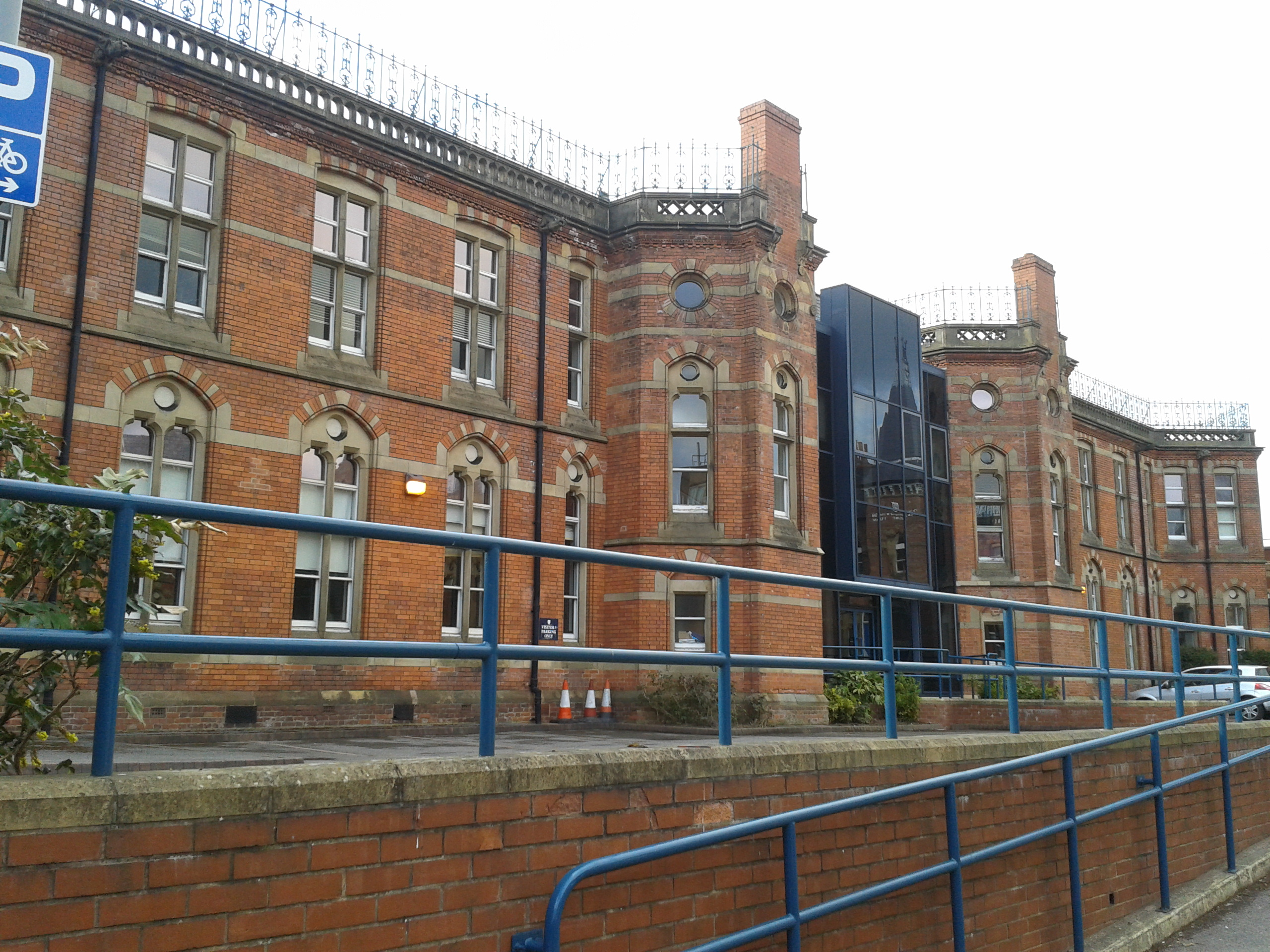
North West buildings

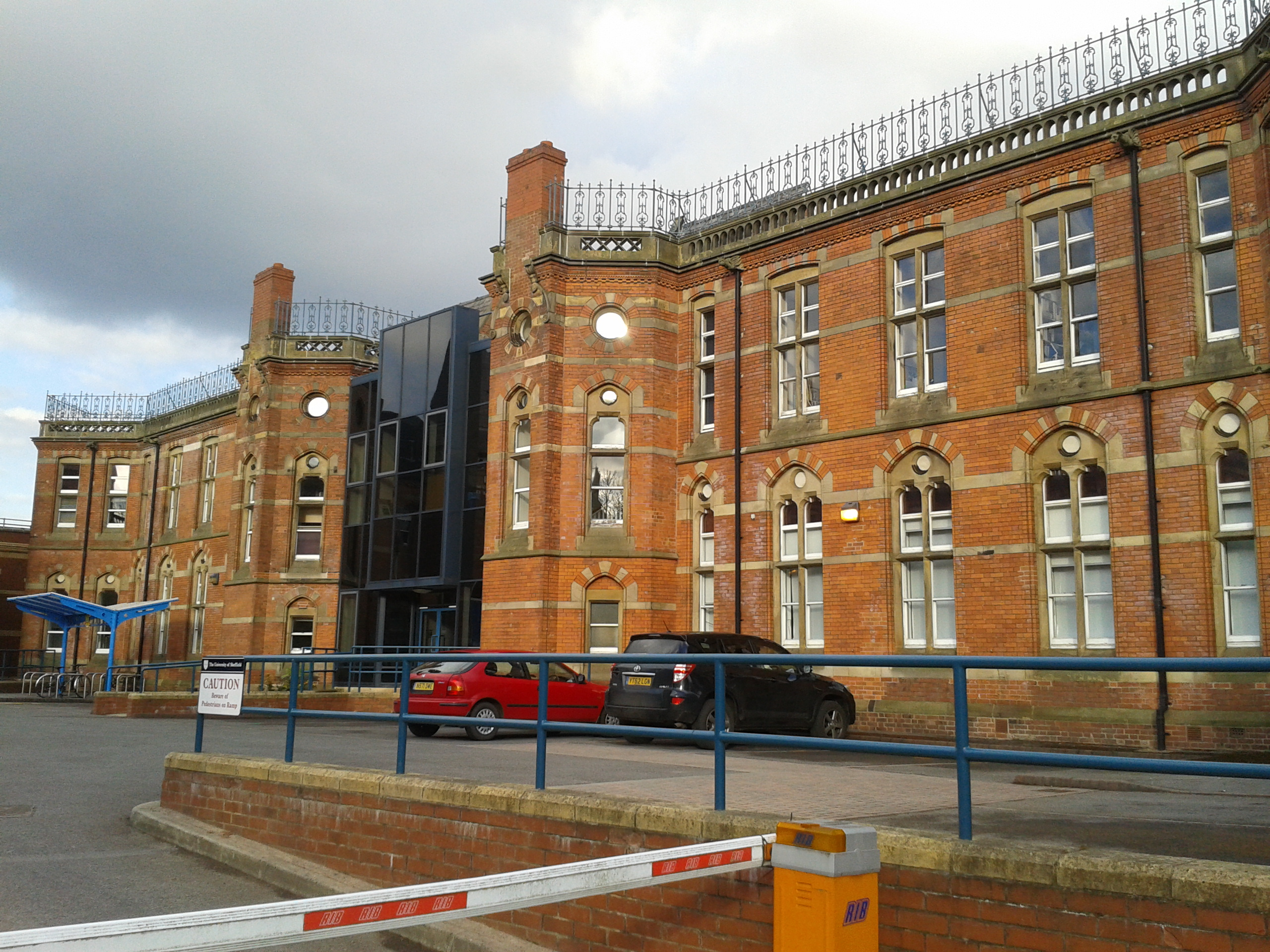
South East buildings

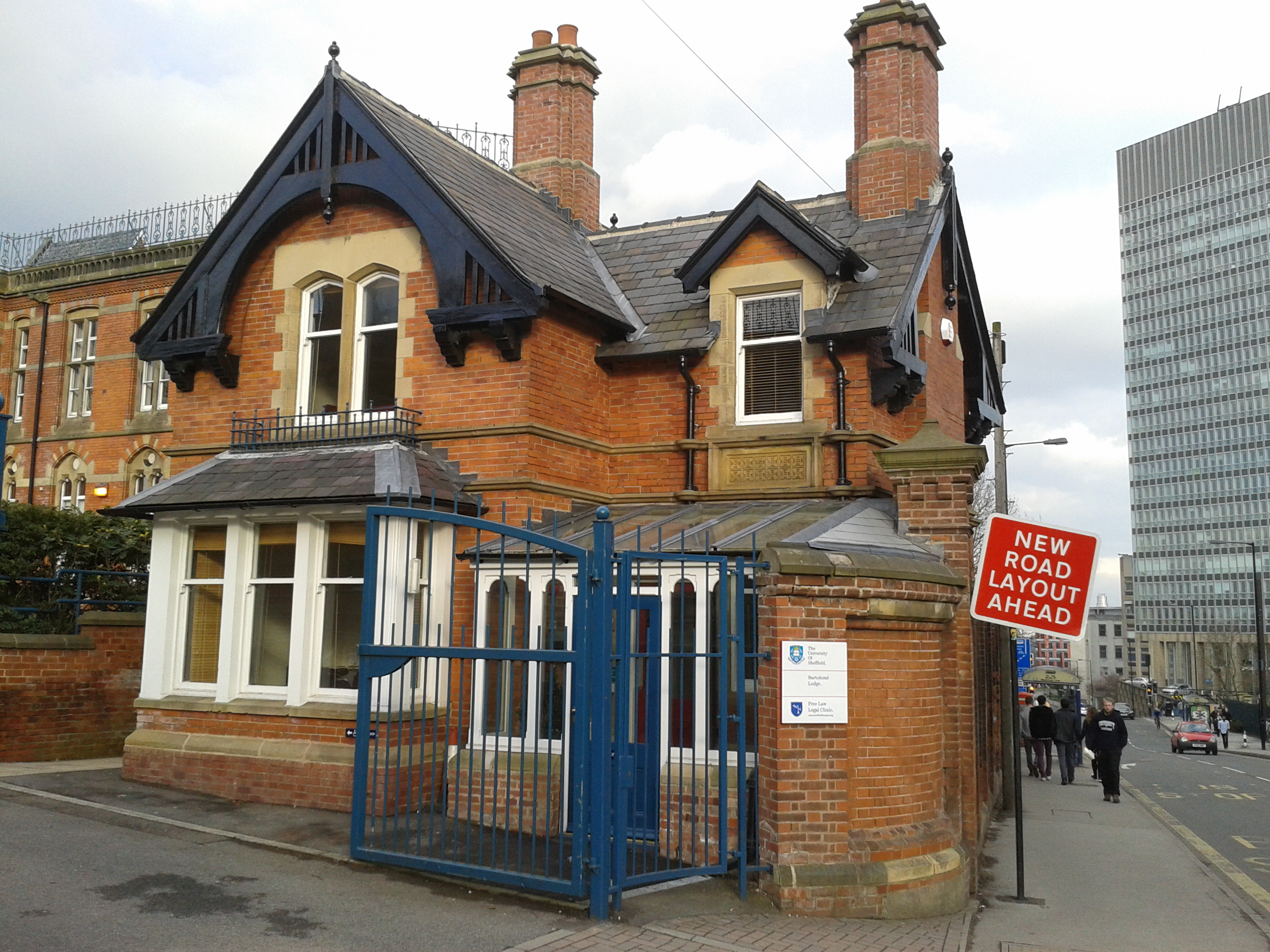
Lodge (also Grade II Listed)
