= Santolaya, Gozón =

Santolaya
- Parish
- Location within Spain
- Coordinates: 43.6°N 5.816667°W
- Country: Spain
- Autonomous community: Asturias
- Province: Asturias
- Municipality: Gozón

Santolaya (Spanish: Nembro) is one of thirteen parishes (administrative divisions) in the Gozón municipality, within the province and autonomous community of Asturias, in northern Spain.

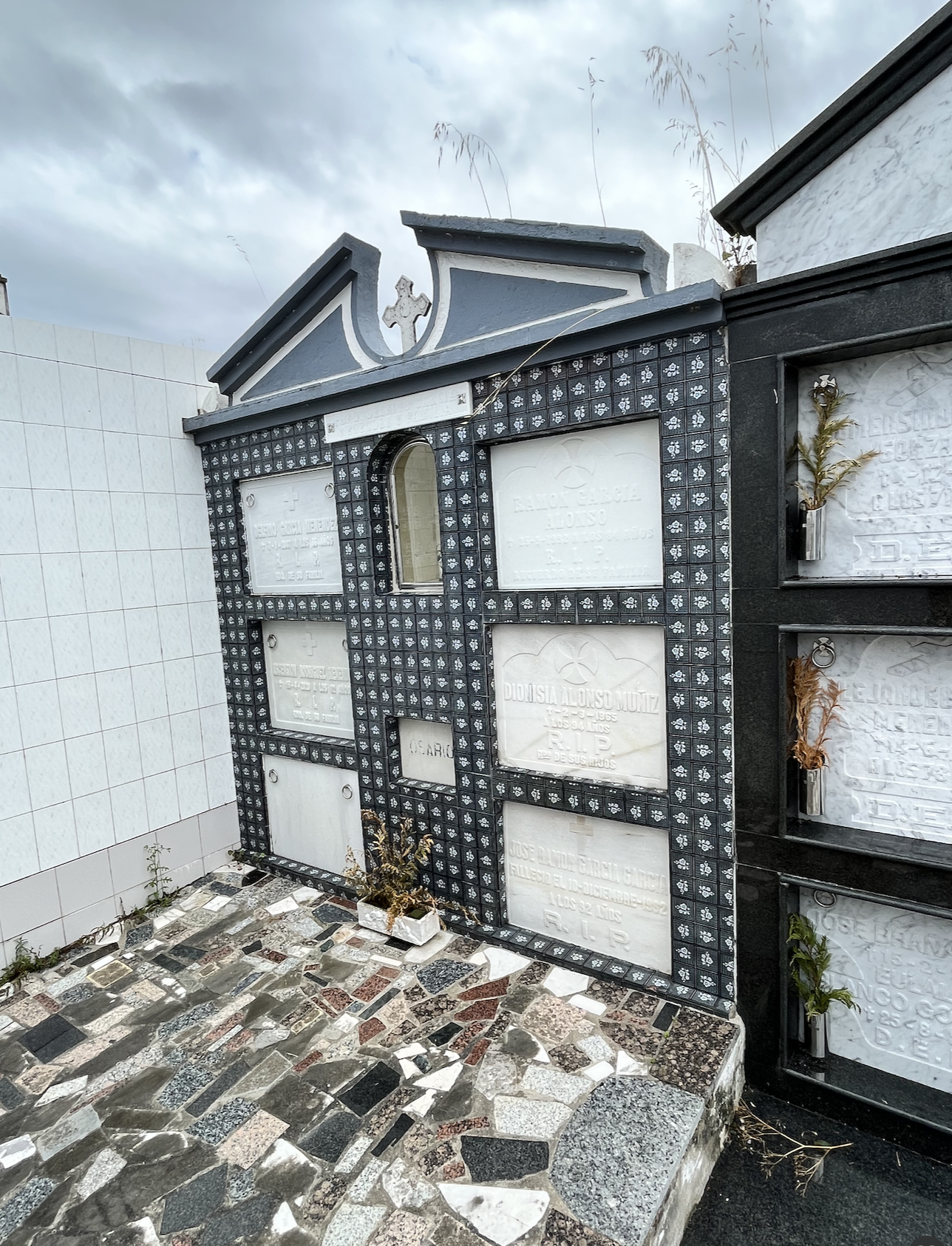
A family plot in the Cementerio parroquial de Nembro

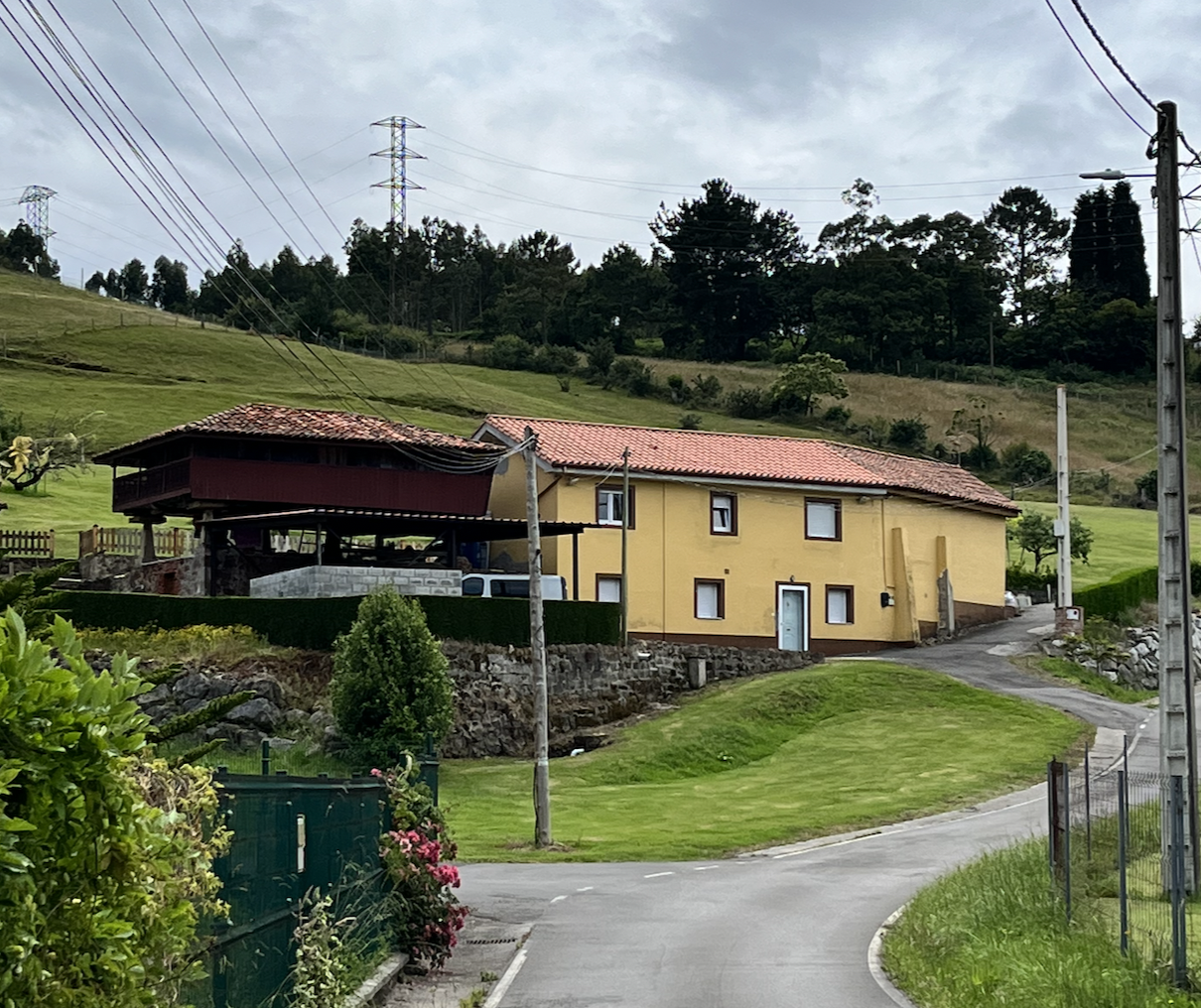
Traditional Asturian house and horreo in Nembro.

== Villages and hamlets ==
- L'Arena
- Balbín
- Bustio
- Nembro
- Susacasa

=== Other populated places ===
- Aguabierta
- Banzoleo
- Biruleo
- Canales
- Cantalarrana
- Colandrero
- El Molín de la Barrera
- Faraguyes
- Fombona
- L'Abeyera
- L'Alzapié
- La Guardada
- La Tayuela
- La Viuda
- Les Cabañes
- Llantada
- Los Llanos
- Montán
