= Loye-sur-Arnon =

- Commune
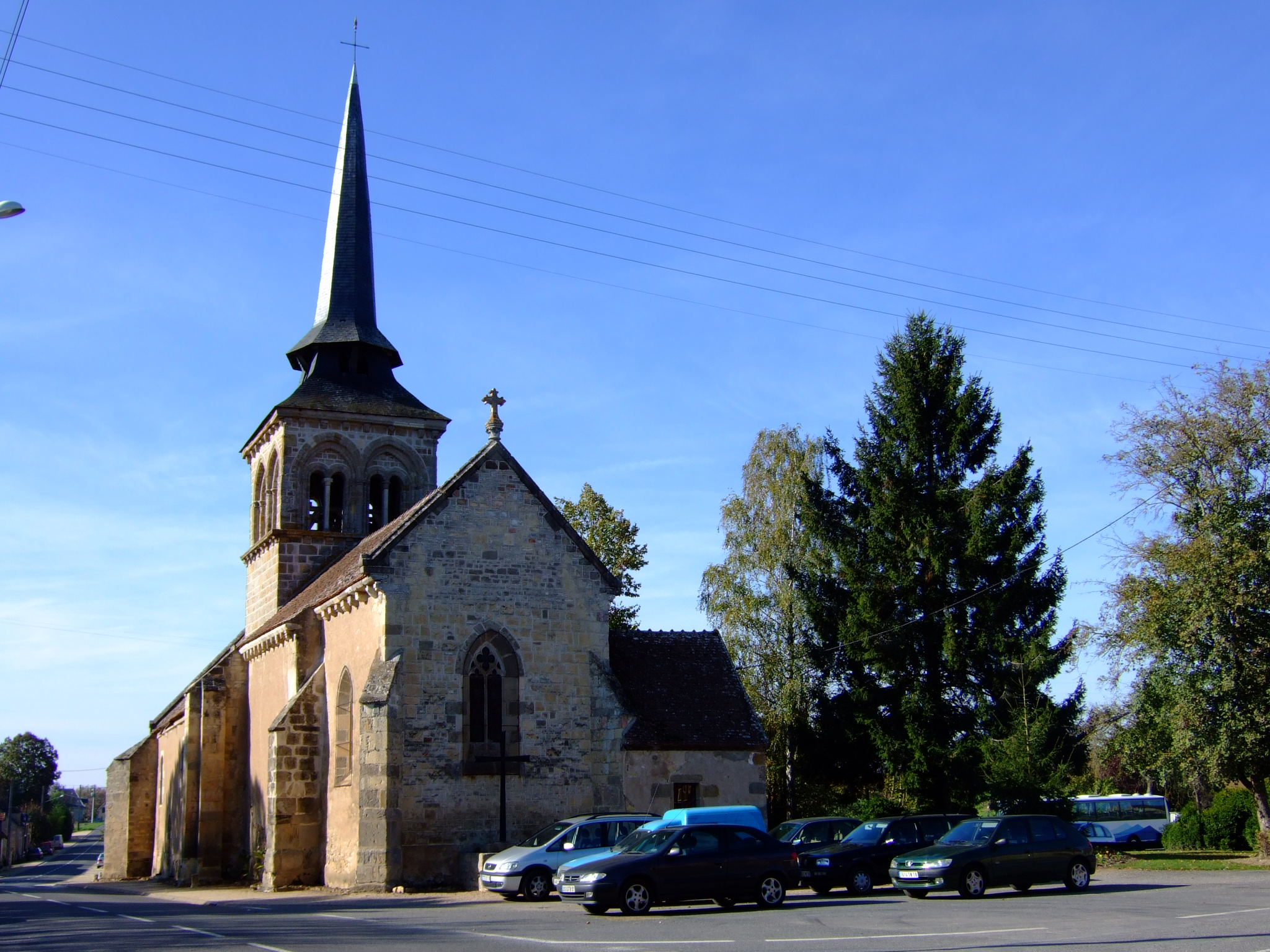
- The church of Saint-Martin, in Loye-sur-Arnon
- Location of Loye-sur-Arnon
- Location within France Location within Centre-Val de Loire
- Coordinates: 46°39′13″N 2°23′14″E
- Country: France
- Region: Centre-Val de Loire
- Department: Cher
- Arrondissement: Saint-Amand-Montrond
- Canton: Châteaumeillant

Government
  - Mayor (2020–2026): Pascal Duplaix
- Area^{1}: 34.15 km^{2} (13.19 sq mi)
- Elevation: 224 m (735 ft)
- Highest elevation: 248 m (814 ft)
- Lowest elevation: 189 m (620 ft)
- Population (2023): 305
  - Density: 8.93/km^{2} (23.1/sq mi)
- Time zone: UTC+01:00 (CET)
  - Summer (DST): UTC+02:00 (CEST)
- INSEE/Postal code: 18130 /18170
- ^{1} French Land Register data, which excludes lakes, ponds, glaciers > 1 km^{2} (0.386 sq mi or 247 acres) and river estuaries.

Loye-sur-Arnon (French pronunciation: [lwa syʁ aʁnɔ̃], literally Loye on Arnon) is a commune in the Cher department in the Centre-Val de Loire region of France.

== Geography ==
An area of lakes, forestry and farming comprising a village and several hamlets situated by the banks of the river Arnon, some 32 miles (51 km) south of Bourges, west of Canton (11 km Saulzais Le Potier and 12 km from Saint-Amand-Montrond), on both the D997 and the D951 roads, covering an area of 3414 ha, 600 ha of forest and 80 km of road and bordered on 9 km from the river.

Its economic activity consists of ten farms ranging from 6-250 hectares and employing them in every 5 employees, 9 craftsmen and traders are also part of the local economy.

Several organizations are involved in the animation of the village: a festival committee, a brotherhood of St. Vincent, an association of parents "Grande Récrée" former tobacco growers, a fishing company and a friendly hunters .

The kindergarten, renovated in 2003, is part of the teaching grouping Arcomps - Ardenais - Loye sur Arnon, and the canteen (which hosts an average of 50 children per room) are located on the town. The canteen is run by an association of parents.

The village lies on the circuit of the pilgrims of Saint Jacques de Compostela, whose house to host the Old Forest, and is crossed by numerous hiking trails, one will discover the Roman Bridge (fully restored in 2002 under the aegis of Historical Monuments).

Since 2003, a multipurpose room with parking is part of municipal assets and its Church of St. Martin of the twelfth century.

== Population ==
Historical population
Year	Pop.	±% p.a.
1968	488	—
1975	390	−3.15%
1982	329	−2.40%
1990	303	−1.02%
1999	308	+0.18%
2007	309	+0.04%
2012	306	−0.19%
2017	305	−0.07%
2023	305	+0.00%
Source: INSEE

== Sights ==
- The church of St. Martin, dating from the twelfth century.
- The ruins of a feudal castle at Buchet.
- The fifteenth-century chateau at Drulon.
- The seventeenth-century manorhouse des Girouettes.
- Three watermills, at Drulon, Graveaux and Méséreau.

== See also ==
- Communes of the Cher department
