= Gozón =

- Municipality
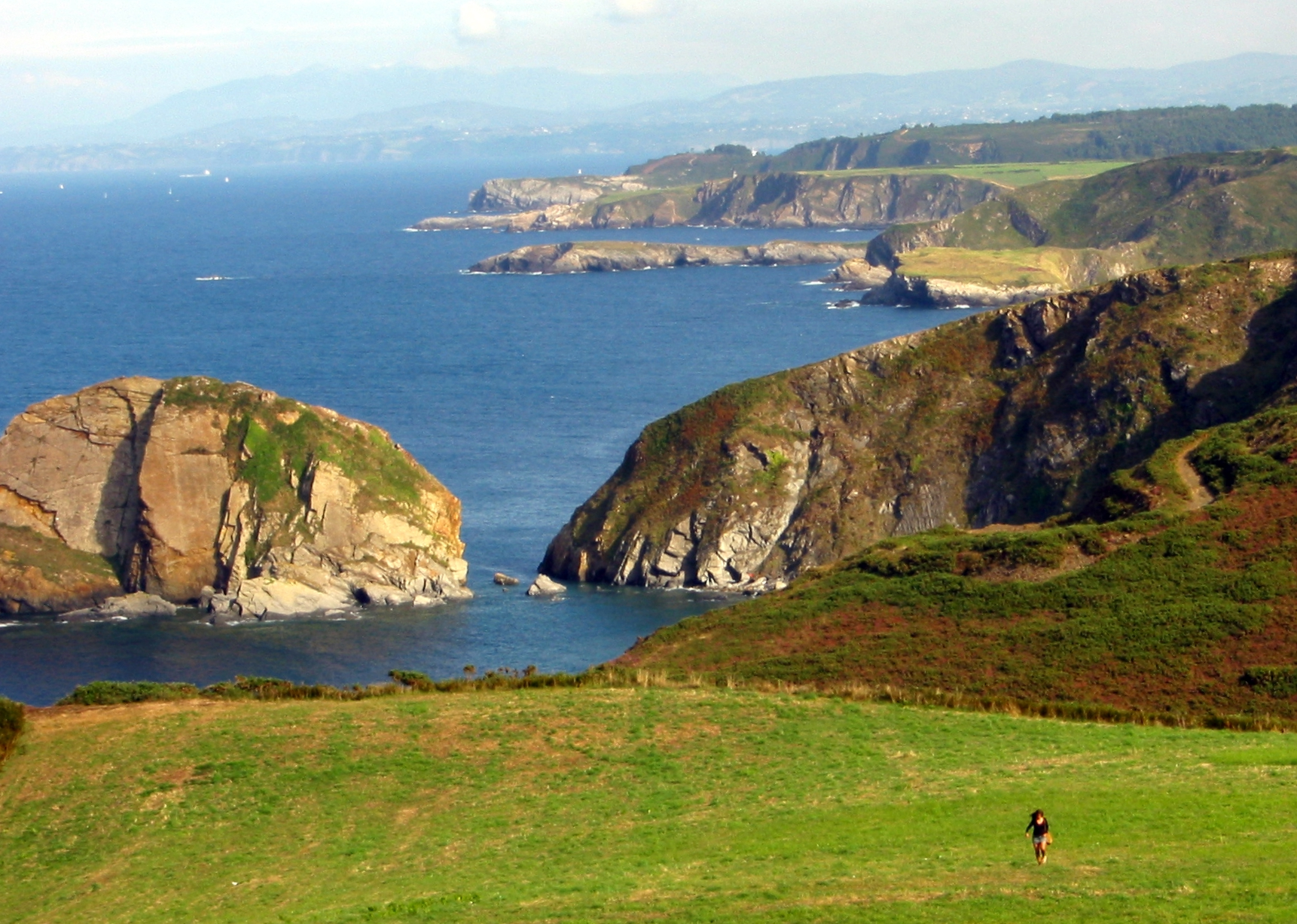
- Cabo de Peñas, Gozón

- Flag Coat of arms

- Location in Spain
- Coordinates: 43°36′36″N 5°47′24″W
- Country: Spain
- Autonomous community: Asturias
- Province: Asturias
- Comarca: Avilés
- Capital: Luanco

Government
  - Alcalde: Salvador Marcelino Fernández (PP)

Area
  - Total: 81.72 km^{2} (31.55 sq mi)
- Highest elevation: 133 m (436 ft)

Population (2025-01-01)
  - Total: 10,407
  - Density: 127.3/km^{2} (329.8/sq mi)
- Demonym: gozoniego/a
- Time zone: UTC+1 (CET)
  - Summer (DST): UTC+2 (CEST)
- Postal code: 33418, 33440, 33448, 33449, 33490
- Official language(s): Bable, Spanish
- Website: Official website

Gozón is a municipality in the Autonomous Community of the Principality of Asturias, Spain. Its capital is the town of Luanco (also called Lluanco). The Cantabrian Sea lies on its northern edge, and it is bordered to the south by Corvera de Asturias, to the west by Avilés, and to the east by Carreño.

The municipality is a fishing port, and the location of the Cabo de Peñas (Cape of Boulders).

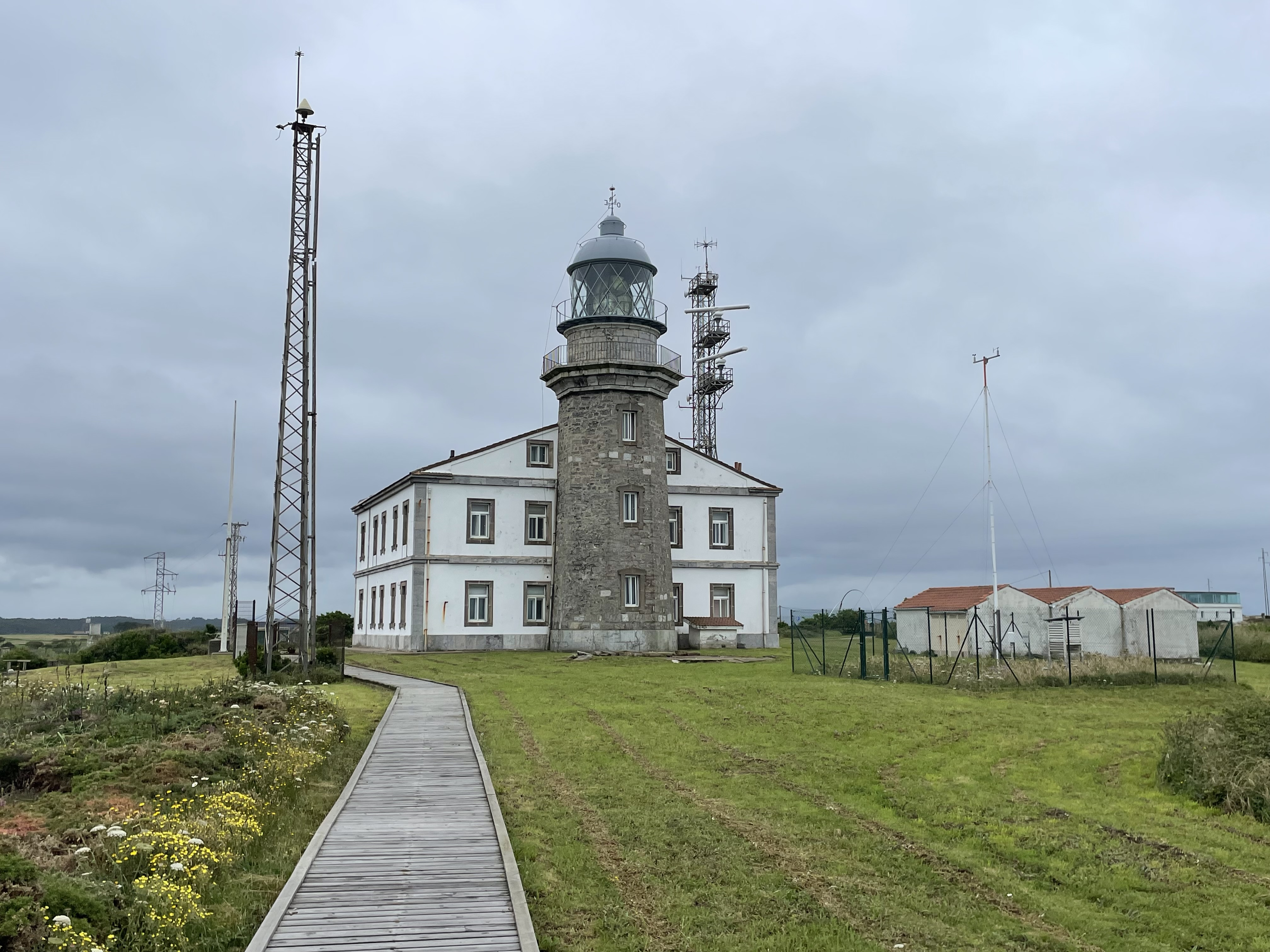
Cabo de Peñas lighthouse

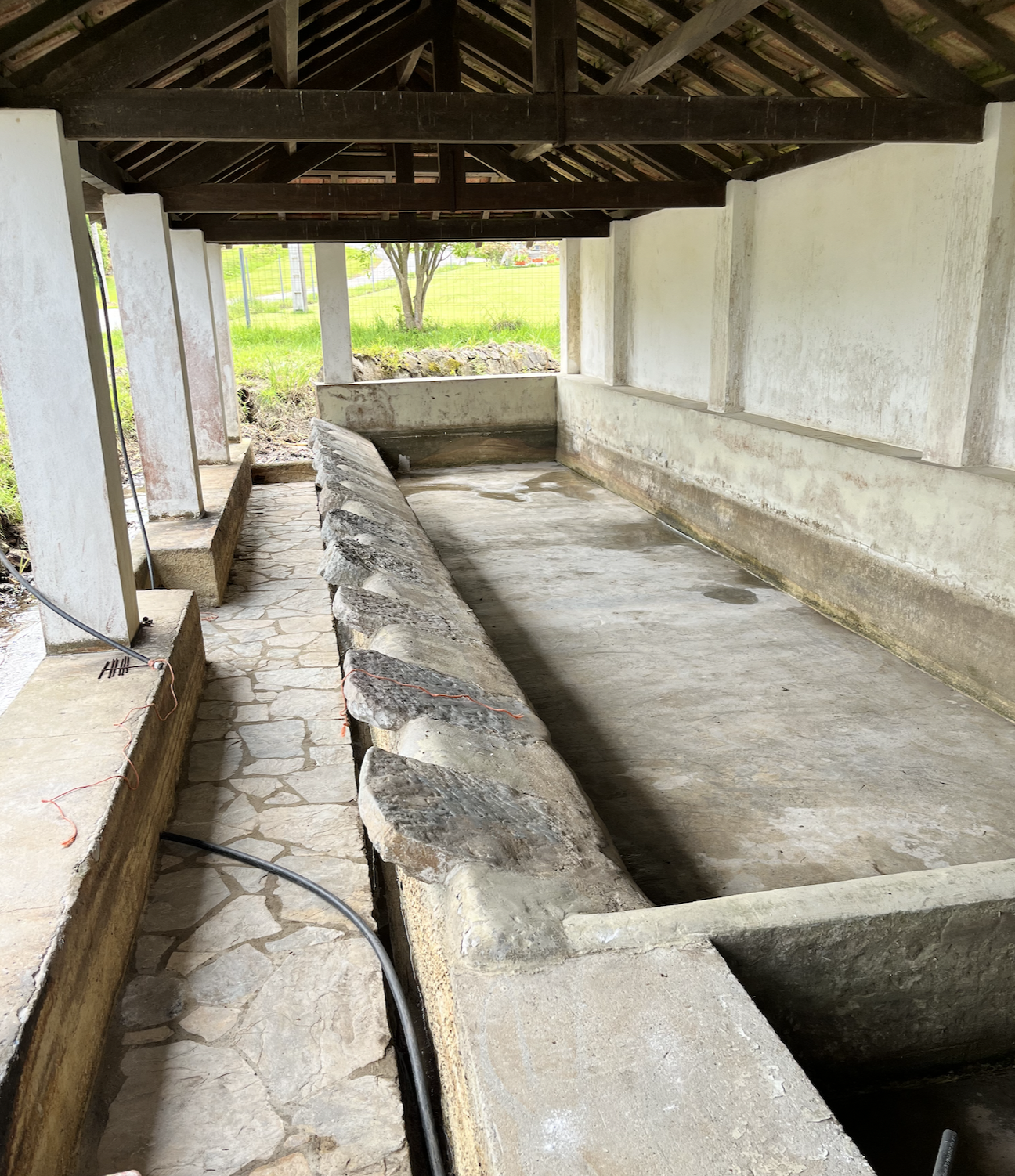
Traditional roadside clotheswashing station outside Luanco in Santa Eualia de Nembro

== Toponymy ==
In decree 72/2005 of July 7, 2005, published in the Boletin Oficial del Principado de Asturias (BOPA; official bulletin of the Principality of Asturias) granted the Asturian forms of the municipal place names official status for all uses, with the exception of the capital Lluanco/Luanco, which maintains a bilingual name. Therefore, with this exception, the Asturian names are the only ones which can appear on road signs and official maps.

== Climate ==
As with the rest of Asturias' populated areas, Gozón has a marine climate with a narrow average high temperature range between 13 °C (55 °F) – 23 °C (73 °F). For the nearest weather station see the weather data for Gijón.

== Main sights ==
- Church of Santa María built in the 18th century
- Palace Menéndez de la Pola
- The Clock Tower, dating from 1705
- Mansion Valdés Pola
- Mansion Mori'
- Palace of Manzaneda, from 1700

== Parishes ==
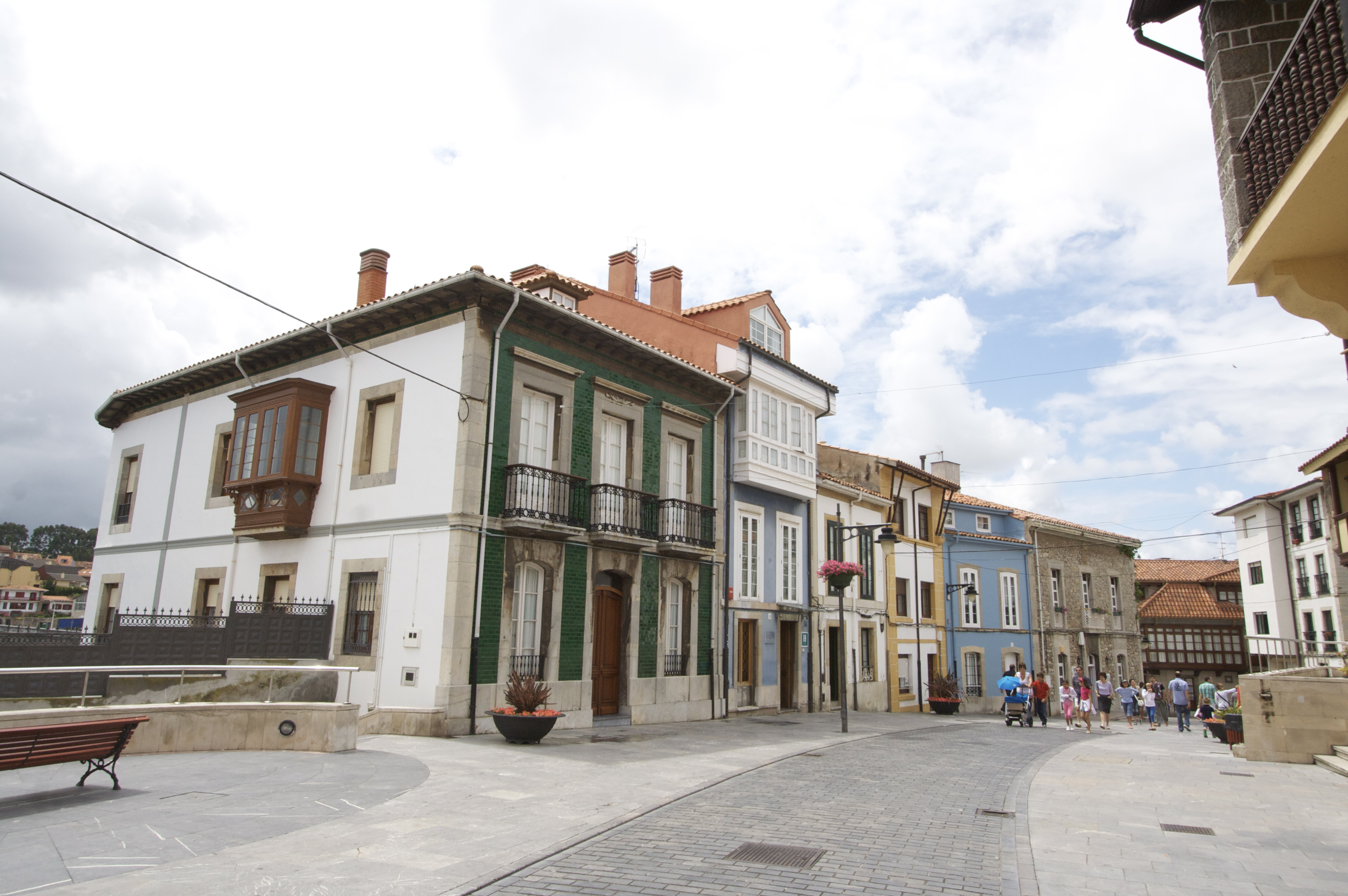
Lluanco, the municipal capital.

- Ambiedes
- Bañugues
- Bocines
- Cardo
- Heres
- Laviana
- Luanco
- Manzaneda
- Nembro
- Podes
- Verdicio
- Vioño
- Viodo

== See also ==
- List of municipalities in Asturias
