= Saint George Parish (Bridgeport, Connecticut) =

Coordinates: 41°10′09.90″N 73°11′39.36″W

St. George Church
- St. George Church
- Location: 443 Park Avenue; Bridgeport, Connecticut
- Country: United States
- Denomination: Roman Catholic

History
- Founded: 1907

Administration
- Province: Hartford
- Diocese: Bridgeport

Clergy
- Bishop: Most Rev. Frank J. Caggiano
- Priest: Father Andris Alexis Moronta

St. George is a Roman Catholic church in Bridgeport, Connecticut, part of the Diocese of Bridgeport.

== History ==
Built originally for a Lithuanian congregation this parish is now nearly 80 percent Spanish-speaking. This elegant Romanesque Revival church dates from shortly after the founding of the parish in 1907.
