= São Jorge, Alto Paraíso de Goiás =

São Jorge
- Village
- Location in Brazil
- Coordinates: 14.177°S 47.814°W
- Country: Brazil
- State: Goiás
- Municipality: Alto Paraíso de Goiás

São Jorge is a village in the city-municipality of Alto Paraíso de Goiás, in the state of Goiás, Brazil. It has a population of approximately 250 people. The village is located at the entrance of the Chapada dos Veadeiros National Park. It is 220 kilometers north of Brasília and can be reached by highway GO-118, which passes through São João d'Aliança.

== History ==
Created by prospectors who arrived in the region in search of quartz, which runs in deep veins under the area, São Jorge was important in the 1950 and 1960s because of its crystal mines. At one time the settlement had as many as 3,000 inhabitants, most of them from the Northeast. One of the most visited sites is the Bus Station Waterfall (Cachoeira da Rodoviária), named so because it was formerly the location where miners' buses arrived and left.

São Jorge was formerly known as the Baixa district of Alto Paraíso, but was renamed in honor of St. George as the area developed. An image of the saint was brought from São Paulo for the chapel built by the miners, and the village holds an annual celebration on April 23, the feast day of St. George.

== Economy and demographics ==
Today São Jorge lives off the small number of tourists who visit the Chapada dos Veadeiros National Park. There is a mixture of different lifestyles among the inhabitants: artists, hippies, intellectuals, and rural people. New Age tourism and alternative communes have also been established.

== Amenities ==
The village has a health clinic, two churches, a community center, a sports court, and a primary school. Tourism infrastructure includes restaurants, inns, craft shops, camping sites, and several bars.
