= Mazaneda =

- Parish
- Location within Spain
- Coordinates: 43.316667°N 5.816667°W
- Country: Spain
- Autonomous community: Asturias
- Province: Asturias
- Municipality: Gozón

Mazaneda is one of thirteen parishes (administrative divisions) in the Gozón municipality, within the province and autonomous community of Asturias, in northern Spain.

The church of San Jorge is located in Mazaneda.

== Villages and hamlets ==
- Alvaré
- Ferrera

=== Other populated places ===
- Bazal
- Cariello
- Cueto
- El Campo l'Álamo
- El Campo la Raíz
- El Cellero
- El Folguerón
- El Fondón
- El Fundil
- El Palacio
- El Payarón
- El Piñusu
- La Cabrera
- La Colina
- La Garita
- La Parte
- La Vallina
- La Vara
- Les Peñes
- Les Vayuergues
- Llabaxo
- Pumarín
