= Saint-Martin-du-Bois =

Saint-Martin-du-Bois may refer to the following places in France:

- Saint-Martin-du-Bois, Gironde, a commune in the Gironde department
- Saint-Martin-du-Bois, Maine-et-Loire, a former commune in the Maine-et-Loire department
