= St. George's Cathedral =

St. George's Cathedral or Cathedral of St. George may refer to:

== Australia ==
- St George's Cathedral, Perth (Anglican)

== Austria ==
- St. George's Cathedral, Wiener Neustadt

== Canada ==
- St. George's Cathedral (Kingston, Ontario), Anglican
- Cathedral of St. George (Saskatoon), Ukrainian Catholic

== Ethiopia ==
- St. George's Cathedral, Addis Ababa, built in 1896

== Georgia (country) ==
- Cathedral of Saint George, Tbilisi (Armenian Apostolic)

== Germany ==
- Limburg Cathedral (Catholic), also known as Georgsdom or Limburger Dom in German after its dedication to Saint George

== Guyana ==
- St. George's Cathedral, Georgetown, one of the world's tallest freestanding wooden structures

== India ==
- St. George's Cathedral, Chennai (formerly Madras)

== Israel and Palestine ==
- St. George's Cathedral, Jerusalem

== Italy ==
- St George's Cathedral, Ferrara
- St George's Cathedral, Caccamo

== Kosovo ==
- Cathedral of Saint George, Prizren

== Lebanon ==
- Maronite Cathedral of Saint George, Beirut
- Saint George Greek Orthodox Cathedral, Beirut

== Romania ==
- St. George Cathedral, Timișoara

== Russia ==
- Saint George Cathedral, Yuryev-Polsky

== Serbia ==
- Saint George Cathedral, Novi Sad
- Saint George Cathedral, Kruševac

== Sierra Leone ==
- St. George's Cathedral, Freetown

== South Africa ==
- St. George's Cathedral, Cape Town
- Greek Orthodox Cathedral of St George, Cape Town

== Syria ==
- Cathedral of Saint George, Damascus

== Turkey ==
- St. George's Cathedral, Istanbul (Greek Orthodox)

== Ukraine ==
- St. George's Cathedral, Lviv

== United Kingdom ==
- St George's Cathedral, Southwark, London (Catholic)
- St George's Cathedral, London, in Camden Town (Antiochian Orthodox)

== United States ==
- Cathedral of St. George Historic District, in Boston, Massachusetts, listed on the U.S. National Register of Historic Places
- St. George Cathedral (Canton, Ohio) (Romanian Greek Catholic)
- St. George Cathedral (Philadelphia) (Greek Orthodox)

== See also ==
- Saint George (disambiguation)
- Cathedral of St Michael and St George (disambiguation)
