= St George's Hospital (disambiguation) =

St George's Hospital is a large teaching hospital in Tooting, London.

St George's Hospital or St George Hospital could also refer to:

== Australia ==
- St George's Hospital, Melbourne, Victoria
- St George Hospital, Sydney, New South Wales

== United Kingdom ==
- St George's Hospital, Havering, London, a former hospital
- St George's Hospital, Morpeth
- St George's Hospital, Sheffield
- St George's Hospital, Stafford

== Other countries ==
- St George Hospital, Mumbai, India
- Saint George Hospital University Medical Center, Lebanon
- St. George's Leper Hospital, Copenhagen, Denmark
- St George's Hospital, Christchurch, New Zealand,
- St George's Hospital, Paphos, Cyprus
- Saint Göran Hospital, Stockholm
