= Abbey of Saint-Georges-du-Bois =

Abbey in Loir-et-Cher, France

Coordinates: 47°43′15″N 0°49′45″E

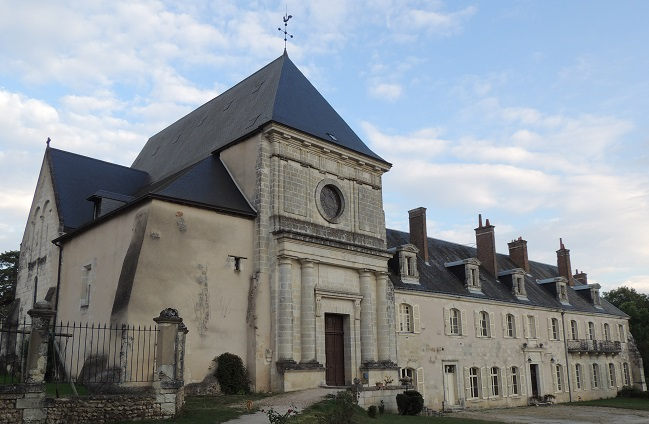
Abbey of Saint-Georges-du-Bois, with the church on the left

The Abbey of Saint-Georges-du-Bois (French: Abbaye de Saint-Georges-du-Bois; Latin: Abbatia S. Georgii de Nemore) is a recently re-established Benedictine monastery at Saint-Martin-des-Bois, a commune in the canton of Montoire-sur-le-Loir and the arrondissement of Vendôme, in Loir-et-Cher, France.

The property was left to the Diocese of Blois by its previous owners and is staffed by former monks of the dissident community at Flavigny-sur-Ozerain, who have agreed to use the Latin liturgy as revised by Pope Paul VI. Their numbers have been increased from 3 to 6 in November 2013.

The church, which is a fine (though unrestored) monument of late Romanesque style of the 12th centuries, with Angevin vaulting, has now been returned to the continuous round of worship which was interrupted by the French Revolution. A restored 13th-century chapter house adjoins. There is debate as to whether the dedication to Saint George, apparently attested in a 12th-century act of bishop Hildebert of Lavardin, bishop of Le Mans, goes back to a much earlier foundation.

== Sources ==
- Migne, Patrologia Latina 171, cols 318-319 (also cols 31–32).
