= Saint-Georges-de-Poisieux =

- Commune
- Location of Saint-Georges-de-Poisieux
- Location within France Location within Centre-Val de Loire
- Coordinates: 46°41′14″N 2°28′46″E
- Country: France
- Region: Centre-Val de Loire
- Department: Cher
- Arrondissement: Saint-Amand-Montrond
- Canton: Châteaumeillant
- Intercommunality: Berry Grand Sud

Government
  - Mayor (2020–2026): Béatrice Beurdin
- Area^{1}: 15.61 km^{2} (6.03 sq mi)
- Elevation: 223 m (732 ft)
- Highest elevation: 218 m (715 ft)
- Lowest elevation: 152 m (499 ft)
- Population (2023): 430
  - Density: 28/km^{2} (71/sq mi)
- Time zone: UTC+01:00 (CET)
  - Summer (DST): UTC+02:00 (CEST)
- INSEE/Postal code: 18209 /18200
- ^{1} French Land Register data, which excludes lakes, ponds, glaciers > 1 km^{2} (0.386 sq mi or 247 acres) and river estuaries.

Saint-Georges-de-Poisieux (French pronunciation: [sɛ̃ ʒɔʁʒ də pwazjø]) is a commune in the Cher department in the Centre-Val de Loire region of France.

== Geography ==
A farming area comprising two villages and a couple of hamlets situated in the valley of the river Cher, about 12 miles (19 km) southeast of Bourges on the D143 road at its junction with the D64 and the D951 roads. The A71 autoroute passes through the northern part of the commune.

== Population ==
Historical population
Year	Pop.	±% p.a.
1968	308	—
1975	292	−0.76%
1982	302	+0.48%
1990	373	+2.67%
1999	357	−0.49%
2007	382	+0.85%
2012	425	+2.16%
2017	456	+1.42%
2023	430	−0.97%
Source: INSEE

== Sights ==
- Two churches, of St. Paul and St. Georges, both dating from the twelfth century.
- The sixteenth-century château of Poisieux.

== See also ==
- Communes of the Cher department
