= Saint Georges Parish, Montserrat =

Parish of Montserrat

Coordinates: 16°45′00″N 62°10′00″W

The parishes of Montserrat: Saint Georges is shown in green

Saint Georges is one of Montserrat's three administrative parishes. The parish is located on the east of the island.

== History ==
Prior to 1995, the parish had a number of populated villages. The Blackburne Airport (also known as the W. H. Bramble Airport), was situated on the east coast.

On 18 July, 1995, the Soufrière Hills volcano, located on the south of the island, became active, resulting in the destruction of villages and towns in the southern and eastern parts of the island, including the former capital, Plymouth. The parish became uninhabited from this point, and the Blackburne Airport was abandoned.
