= St. George's College =

St. George's College may refer to:

== Educational institutions ==
- St. George's College, Quilmes, Argentina
- St George College, South Australia, in Adelaide, Australia
- St George's College, Perth, Australia
- Royal St. George's College, Toronto, Canada
- University of Toronto St. George, Toronto, Canada
- Saint George's College, Santiago, Chile
- St. George's College, Cairo, Egypt
- St. George's College, Agra, India
- St George's College, Mussoorie, India
- St. George's College, Jamaica, in Kingston
- St George's College, Weybridge, Elmbridge, Surrey, UK
- St. George's College, Harare, Zimbabwe
- St. George's College, Jerusalem

== Other ==
- College of Saint George, a chantry, Windsor

== See also ==
- St. George's School (disambiguation)
- St. George's University, Grenada
