= Order of Saint George (Kingdom of Hungary) =

Chivalric order

Order of St George
- Type: Order of Chivalry
- Founded: 1326; 700 years ago
- Country: Kingdom of Hungary
- Motto: In truth I am just to this fraternal society
- Status: defunct
- Founder: Charles I of Hungary

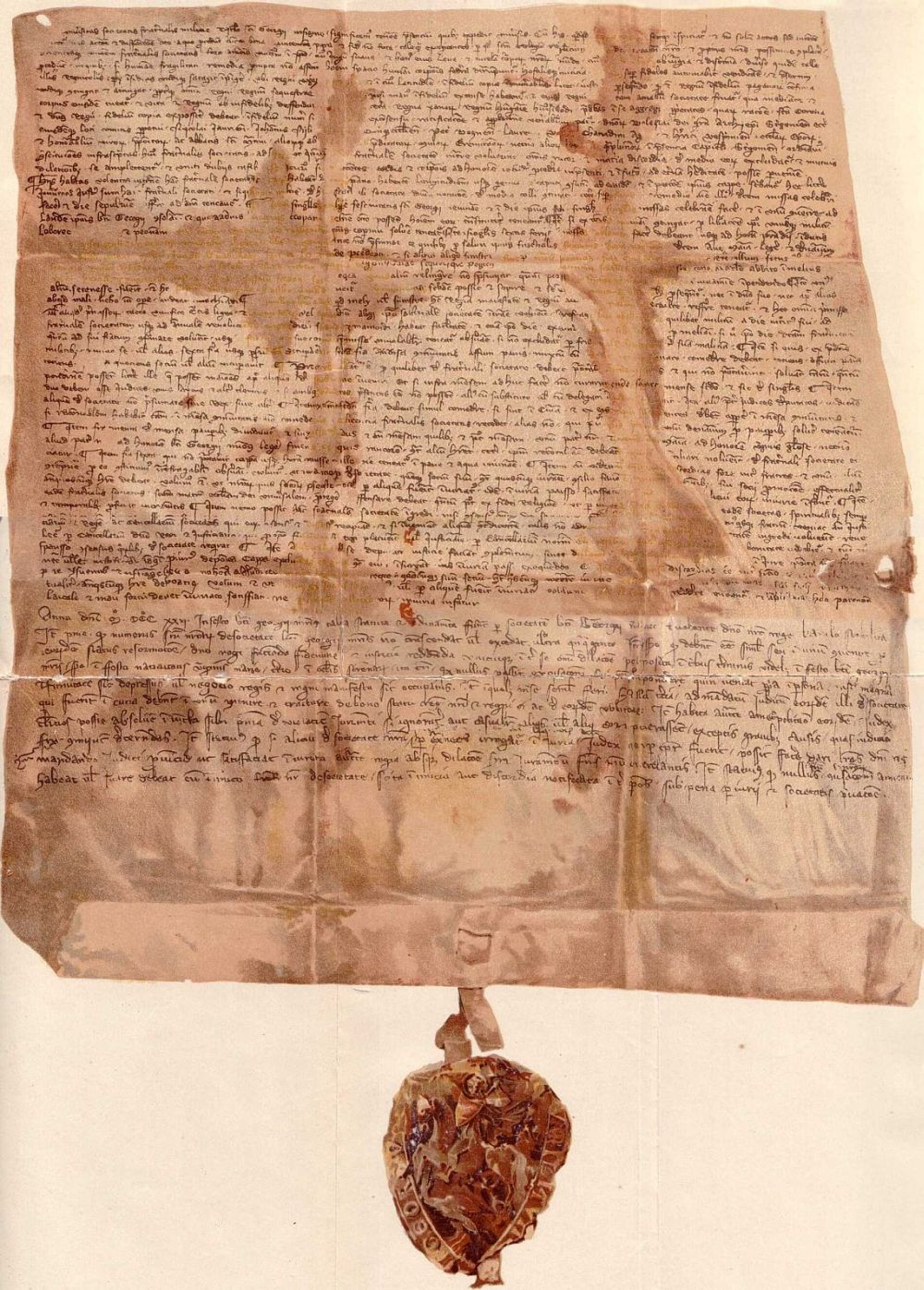
The Statutes of the Order afixed with the Great Seal bearing an image of St George slaying the dragon.

The Order of St George, Hungarian: Szent György Vitézei Lovagrend, was the first secular chivalric order in the world established by King Charles I of Hungary in 1326.

== History ==
The Order was founded by King Charles I of Hungary as the Fraternal Society of Knighthood of St George. The precise date of its foundation is not known, but based on the text of its Statutes, it was in existence on St George's Day, 23 April 1326. The order flourished during Charles' reign and achieved greater success under the reign of his son King Louis I of Hungary. After the death of Louis, however, the Hungarian throne became the subject of a violent dispute between his relations, and the Hungarian kingdom dissolved into civil war, destroying the original Society.

All that is known about the Order in terms of its mission, composition, obligations and activities has been obtained from the only surviving artifact which describes the Society: the Statutes.

Based on the Order's Statutes, although the Society of St George was a political and honorary body, Charles infused the ideals of chivalry into the Society promoting them among the lesser nobles of his kingdom and implementing the classic symbol of chivalry, the knights' tournament, in Hungarian festivals of chivalry. Unlike the ecclesiastical Orders of the period, members of the Society wore a black, knee-length, hooded mantle, bearing not an heraldic device but an inscription:

"In Veritate iustus sum huic fraternali societae" - "In truth I am just to this fraternal society."

The Statutes, written in Latin (the language of learned writing in Hungary before the nineteenth century), are about 1,700 words long, in the form of letters patent. Suspended from the document was the great seal of the Society bearing an image of the classic iconic representation of St George mounted on a horse slaying the dragon under the horse's hooves (as shown on the right). The document is currently housed in the Országos Levéltár (National Archives of Hungary), DL. 40 483. There are a number of transcriptions and translations of the Statutes, facilitating study.
