= St. George's School =

St George's School or Saint George's School may refer to:

== Brunei ==
- St. George's School, Brunei

== Chile ==
- Saint George's College, Santiago

== Canada ==
- St. George's School of Montreal, Quebec
- St. George's School (Vancouver), British Columbia

== Germany ==
- St. George's The British International School

== India ==
- St. George's Grammar School (Hyderabad)
- St. George's School, Chennai
- St George's College, Mussoorie, Uttarakhand

== Israel and Palestine ==
- St. George's College, Jerusalem
- St. George's School, Jerusalem

== Italy ==
- St. George's British International School, Rome

== Malaysia ==
- St. George's Girls' School, George Town, Penang
- St. George's Institution, Taiping

== South Africa ==
- St. George's Grammar School (Cape Town)

== Spain ==
- St. George's British School, Sevilla, Seville

== Switzerland ==
- St George's School in Switzerland

== Turkey ==
- St. George's Austrian High School, Istanbul

== United Kingdom ==
=== England ===
- St George's Catholic School, Maida Vale, London
- St George's School, Windsor Castle, Berkshire
- St George's School, Ascot, Berkshire
- St George's School, Harpenden (St.George's V.A School), Hertfordshire
- St George's School, Stowmarket; renamed to Finborough School
- St. George of England Specialist Engineering College (formerly St. George of England High School), Bootle, Merseyside
- St George's Church of England School, Gravesend, Kent
- St George's Church of England Foundation School, Broadstairs, Kent
- St George's School, Blackpool, Lancashire
- St George's College, Weybridge, Surrey
- St George's School, Birmingham, West Midlands

=== Scotland ===
- St. George's School, Edinburgh

== United States ==
- St. George's School, Tinley Park, Illinois
- St. George School, Baton Rouge, Louisiana; see Education in Baton Rouge, Louisiana § Private schools
- St. George's School (Rhode Island), Middletown, Rhode Island
- St. George's Independent School, Memphis, Germantown, and Collierville, Tennessee
- Saint George's School (Spokane, Washington)

== Zimbabwe ==
- St. George's College, Harare

== See also ==
- St George's Academy
- St. George's College (disambiguation)
