= Paul Hartog =

German Jewish banker and art collector murdered in the Holocaust

Paul Julius Hartog (born 20 March 1868 in Goch or Mülheim an der Ruhr; died 16 December 1942 in Ghetto Theresienstadt) was a German Jewish banker and art collector murdered in the Holocaust.

== Life ==
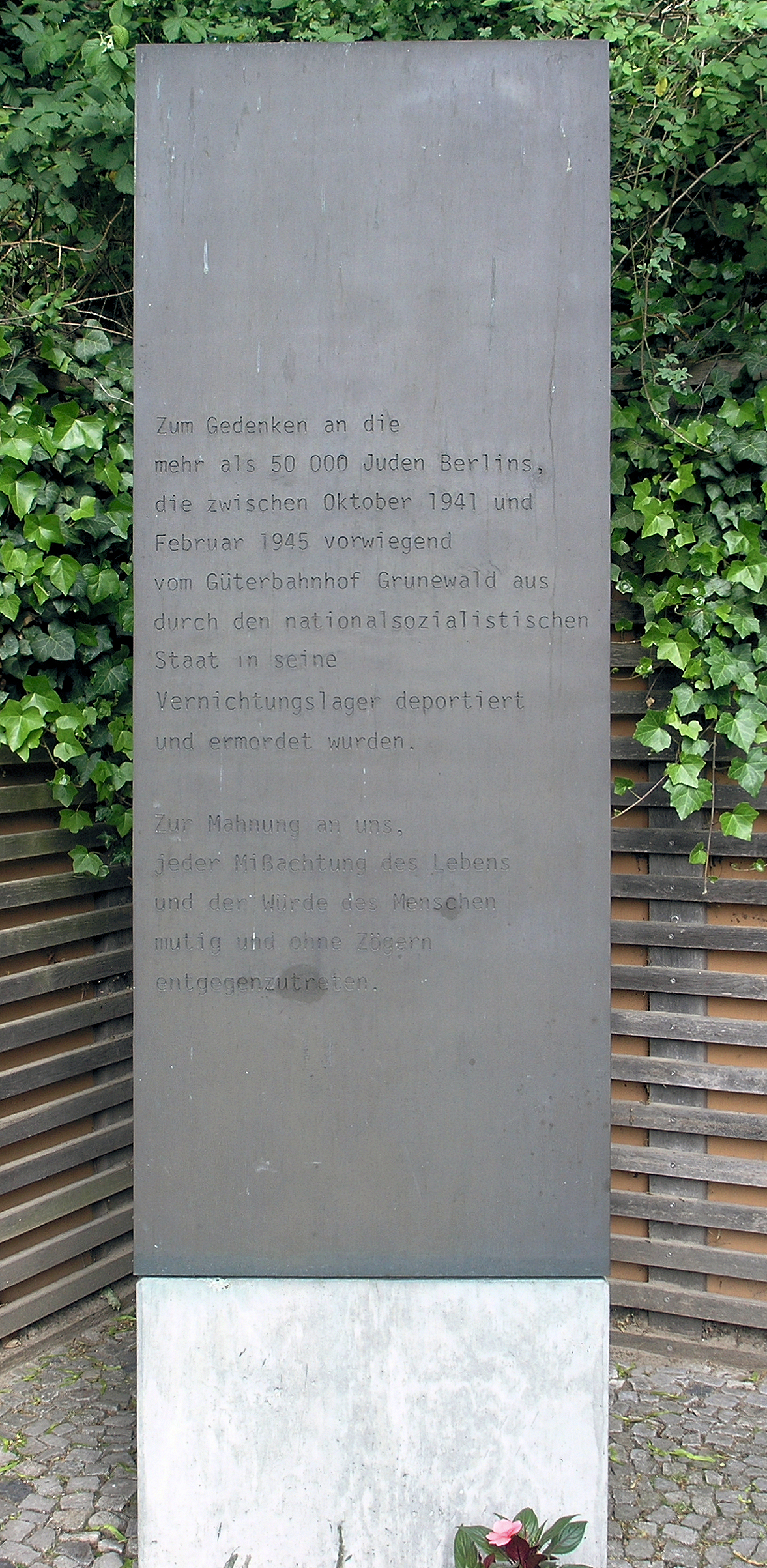
Gedenktafel am Bahnhof Berlin-Grunewald „... für mehr als 50000 Juden Berlins ... zur Mahnung an uns, jeder Mißachtung des Lebens und der Würde des Menschen mutig und ohne zu zögern entgegenzutreten“

Paul Hartog came from a Jewish family; his father was a banker in Aachen and his mother was born in Hanau.

Hartog trained at Bankhaus Gustav Hanau in Mülheim/Ruhr and then worked at Disconto-Bank in Breslau. He was later elected Deputy Chairman of the Management Board of Darmstädter Bank.

In 1917, in the middle of the First World War, Hartog founded the private bank named after him, Hartog & Co. in Berlin, of which he was also the owner. He was also a member of several supervisory boards; as chairman of the supervisory board, he managed the Berlin-based stock corporations Adler Phonograph AG and Orchestrola-Vocalion AG.

Paul Hartog was a member of the Kaiser Friedrich Museumsverein (KFMV), whose purpose was to promote the Gemäldegalerie and the sculpture collection of the Staatliche Museen zu Berlin.

Hartog married Gertrude Katz (née Trude, daughter of Hannover banker Simon Katz.

== Nazi-era persecution ==
When the Nazis came to power in 1933, Hartog was persecuted due to his Jewish heritage. In a 1935 “Aryanization”, Hartog was forced out of the bank because of only Aryans or non-Jews were allowed, in accordance with Nazi racial laws”.

On 7 July 1942 Paul Hartog was deported from Berlin to the Theresienstadt ghetto, where he was murdered after five months on 16 December 1942.

== Legacy ==
"The Letter," from Hartog's collection was located in the Denver Art Museum. Hartog was forced to sell it in a Nazi-coerced auction at the Graupe auction house in 1934. The painting, believed to be by a follower of 17th-century Dutch artist Gerard Terborch, was purchased by museum trustee Robert Silbar in 1961. After the war, his daughter, Marianne Rosson, and her family searched for the artworks. In the 1960s, Rosson’s nephew spotted a copy of "The Letter" in a Denver Art Museum catalog and contacted the museum.

== See also ==
- The Holocaust
- History of Jews in Germany
- Geschichte der Juden in Deutschland
