= Grunewald (forest) =

Forest in Grunewald, Germany

Coordinates: 52°28′N 13°15′E

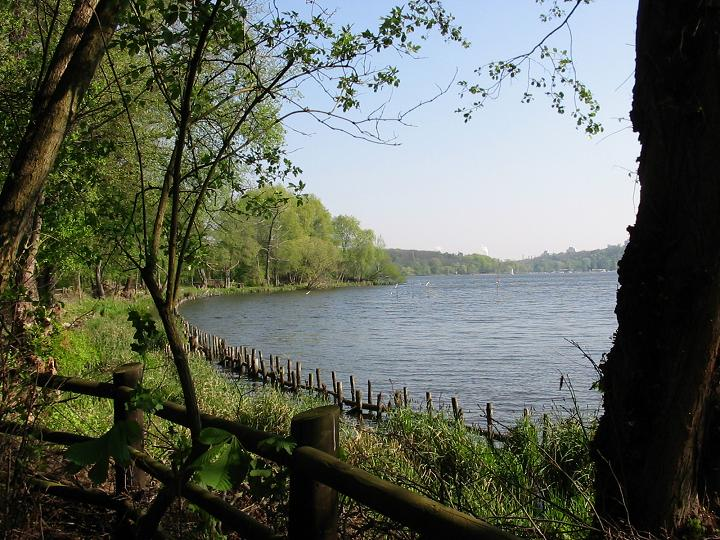
Havel river in Grunewald at Schildhorn

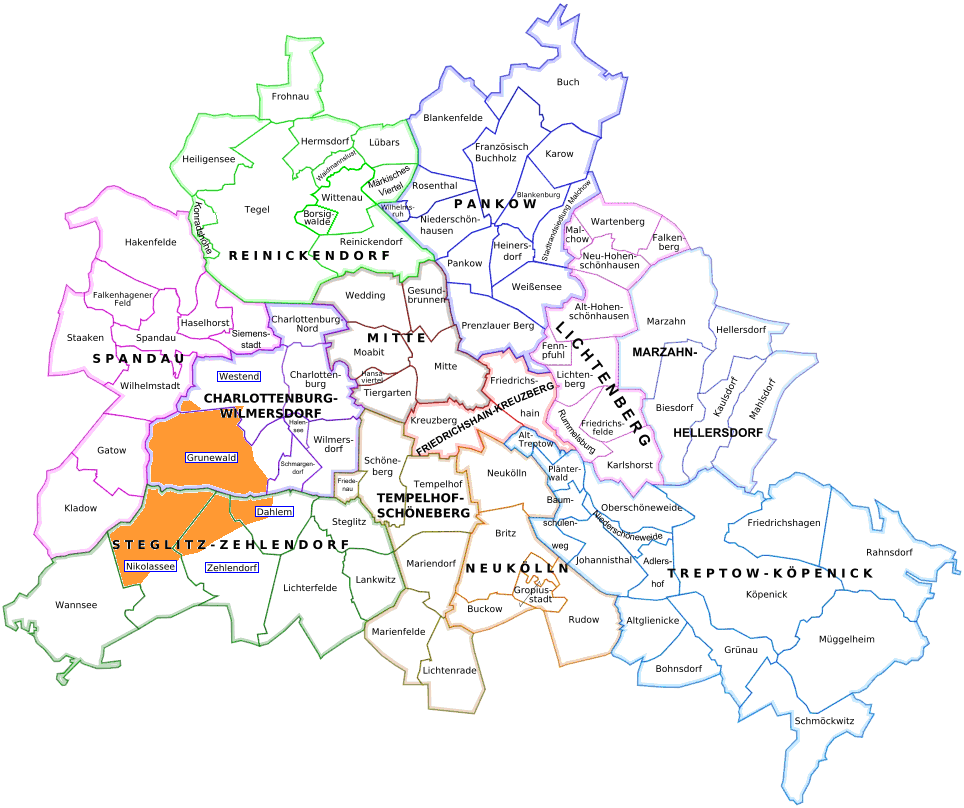
Locator map of the forest (shown in orange) in Berliner territory

Grunewald (German pronunciation: [ˈɡʁuːnəˌvalt]) is a German forest located in the western side of Berlin on the east side of the Havel, mainly in the Grunewald locality. At 3,000 hectares (7,400 acres) it is the largest green area in the city of Berlin.

== Geography ==
The forest occupies, on the western side, 3/4 of the Grunewald locality, a small portion of the southern part of Westend (both in the Charlottenburg-Wilmersdorf borough); a great part of Nikolassee, the northern side of Zehlendorf and the northwestern part of Dahlem (all 3 in the Steglitz-Zehlendorf borough). It is close to the border of the neighborhood of Wannsee and its lake, and is near the Düppel forest. It is divided by the Havel river from the localities of Kladow, Gatow and Wilhelmstadt (all in the Spandau borough). It also borders the locality of Schmargendorf.

There are two islets located off the forest in the Havel (Lindwerder and Schwanenwerder) and a small peninsula (Schildhorn); and the tallest point is the hill of Teufelsberg, which is 117 metres (384 ft) above sea level. On the northern border is found the Funkturm Berlin (radio tower) and the Messe Berlin (the trade show).

Beyond the river Havel and part of the Großer Wannsee lake, the forest is rich in lakes and ponds. The biggest are the Schlachtensee, Krumme Lanke, the Grunewaldsee and the Hundekehlesee (German pronunciation: [ˈhʊndə.keːləˌzeː]). These lakes are located along the eastern edge of the forest and are linked by a canal. The other lakes are the Riemeisterfenn (between Krumme Lanke and Grunewaldsee), the Teufelssee (in central-north area), and Pechsee and Barssee (both in the middle of the forest).

== Environment ==
The Grunewald forest is mainly composed of conifers and betulaceae. Some areas are nature reserves (Naturschutzgebiet), from which visitors are forbidden, in order to protect the animals (especially amphibians and birds).

== Transport ==
The area is served by the S-Bahn line S7 at Berlin Grunewald railway station, located at the main entrance of the forest. It is also traversed by the AVUS road, now part of the BAB 115 motorway.

The border of the Grunewald can also be reached by several other S-Bahn stations : Berlin Nikolassee (S1 + S7), Berlin Schlachtensee (S1), Berlin Heerstraße (S3 + S75), Berlin Pichelsberg (S3 + S75). The southeastern borders are linked by two U-Bahn stations: Krumme Lanke and Onkel Toms Hütte (both on U3 line).

== Photogallery ==
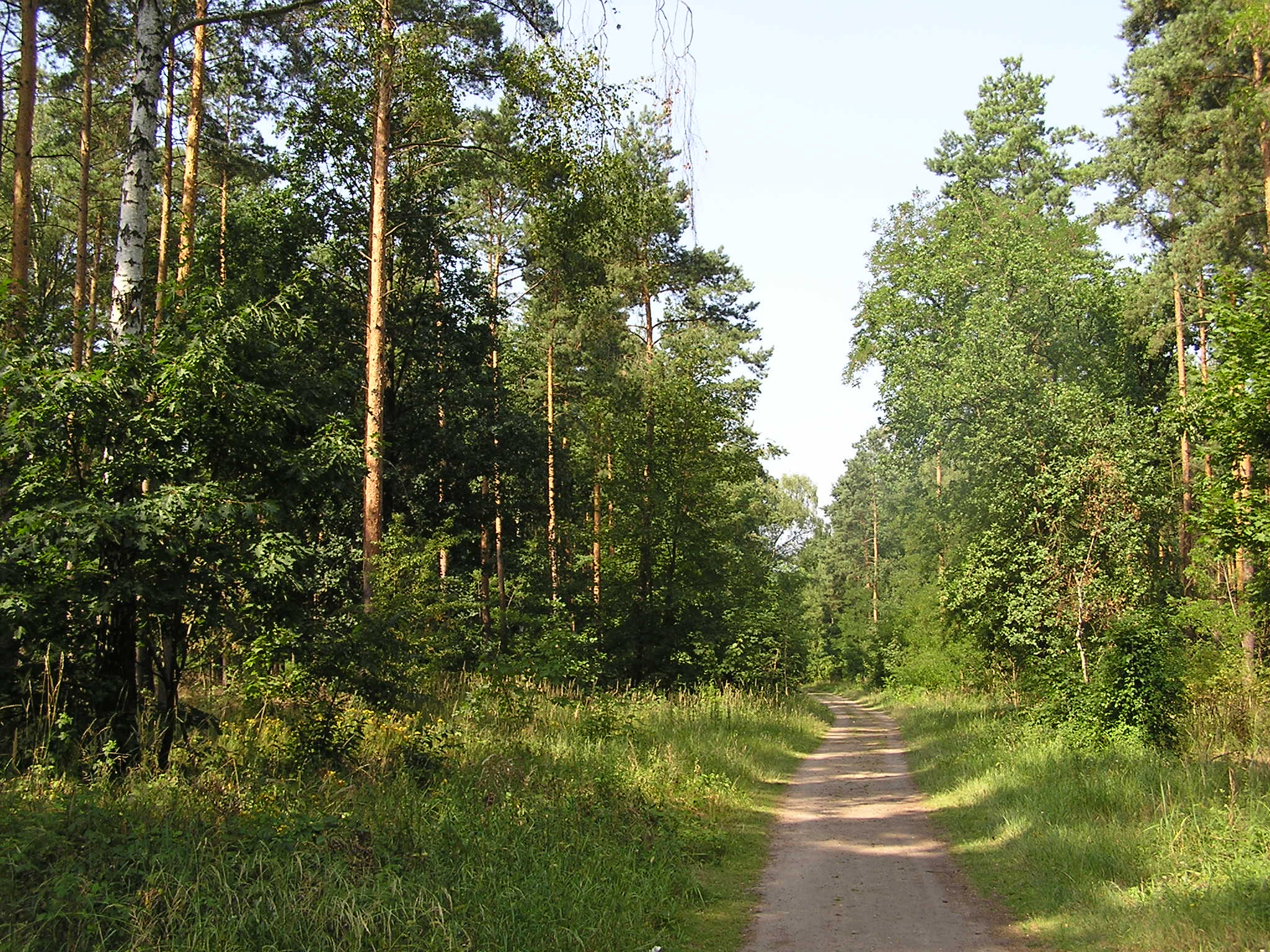
A forest view at Schildhornweg

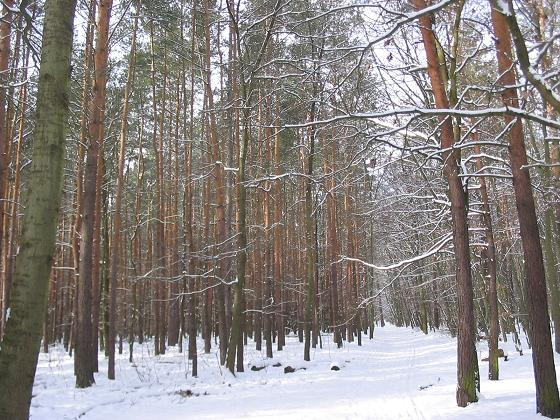
Grunewald in winter

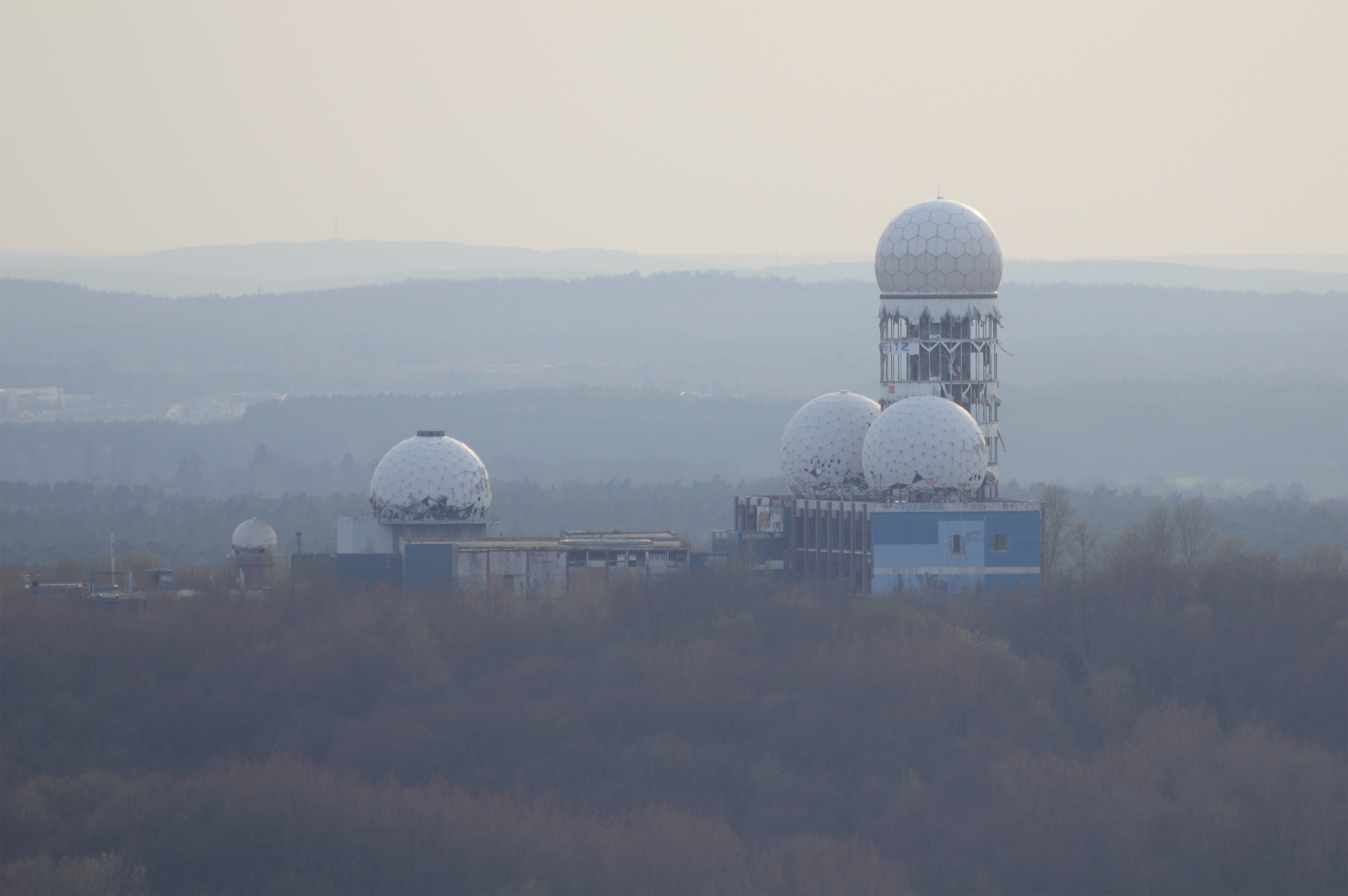
Teufelsberg

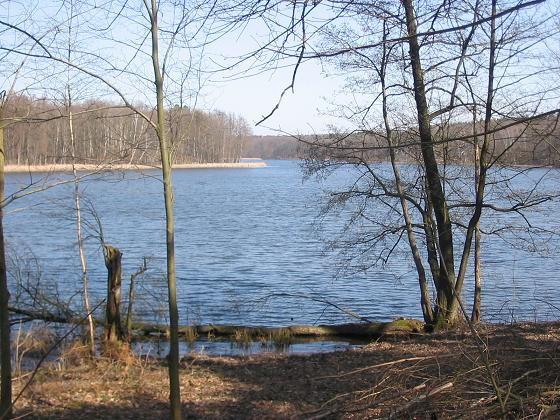
Grunewaldsee lake

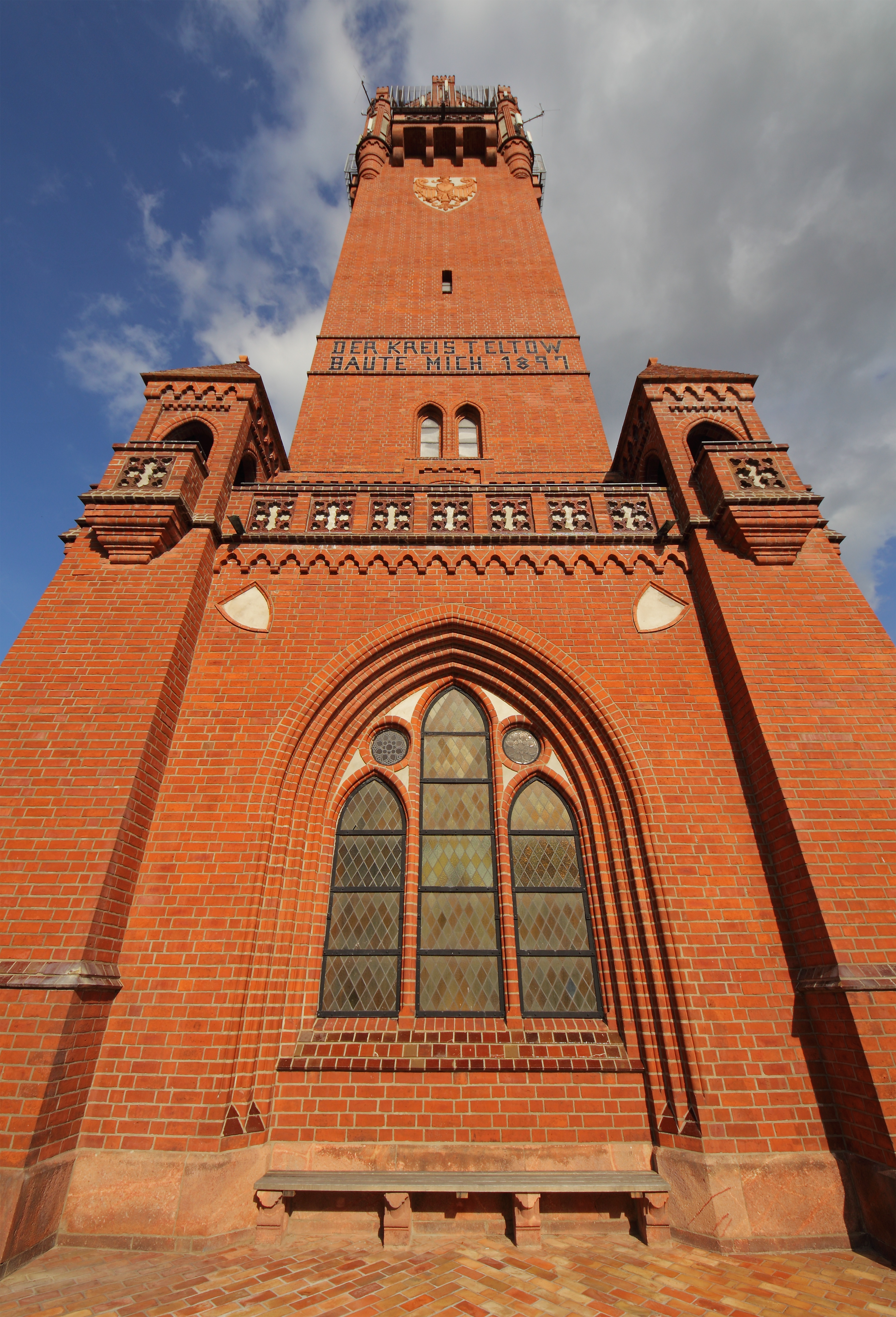
Grunewaldturm

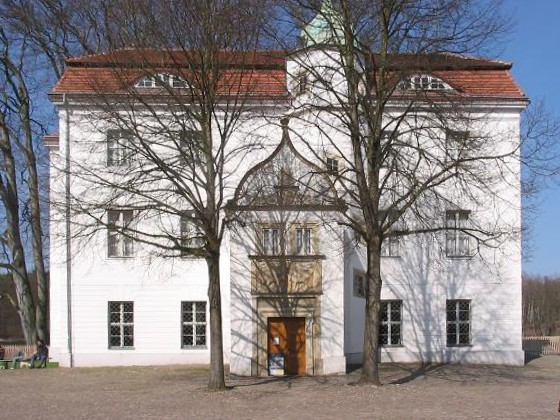
Hunting Lodge

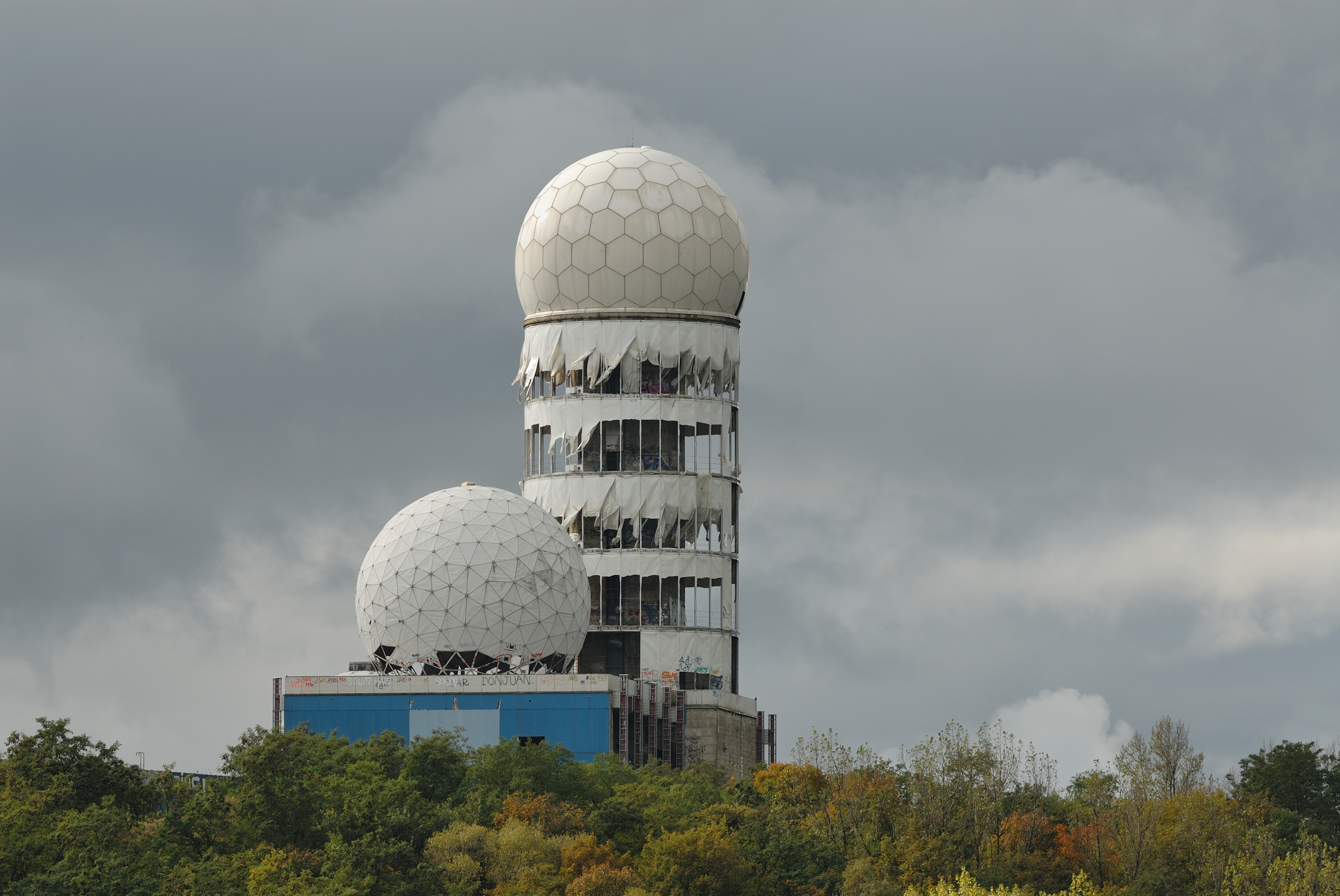
Radar at Teufelsberg

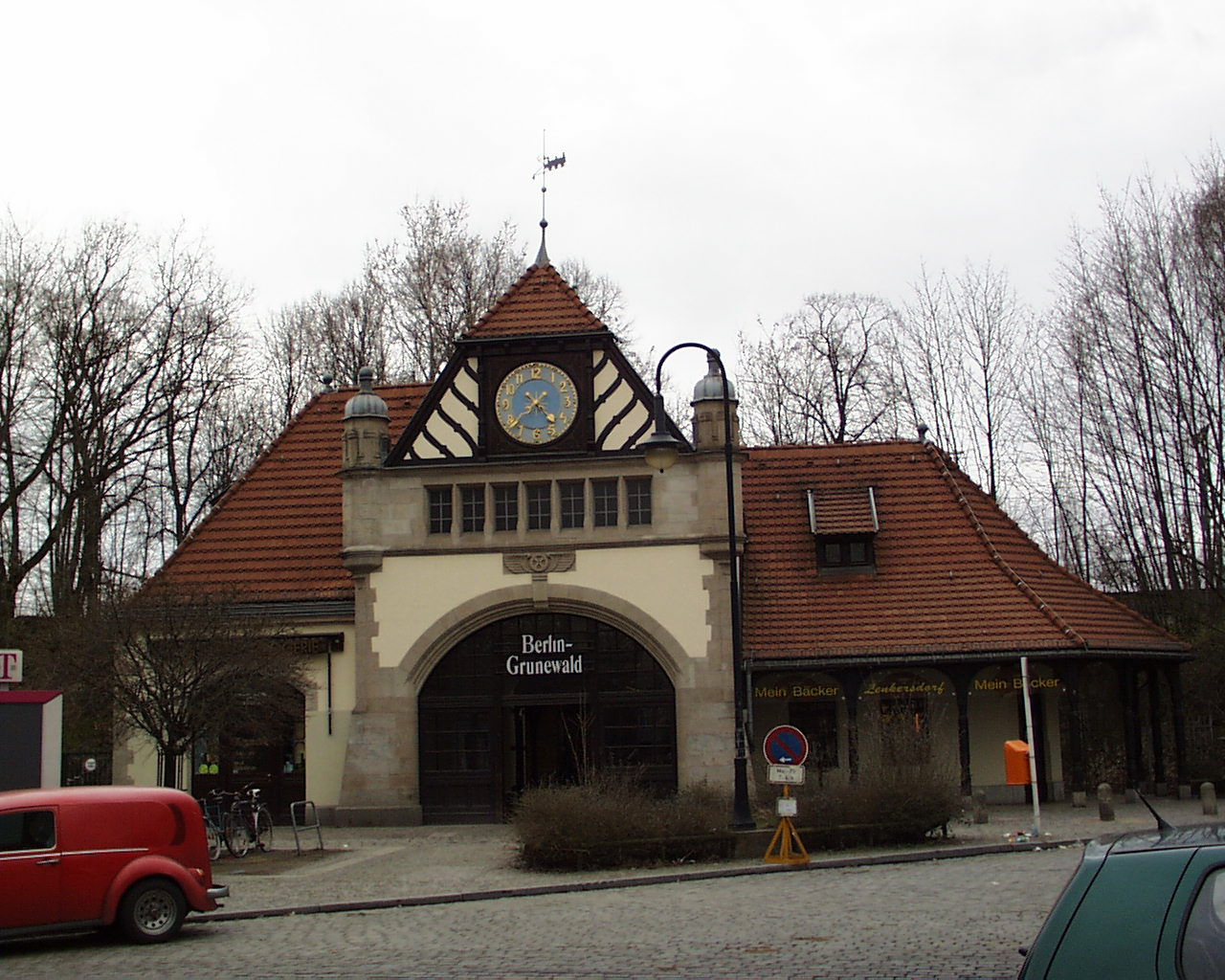
Railway station

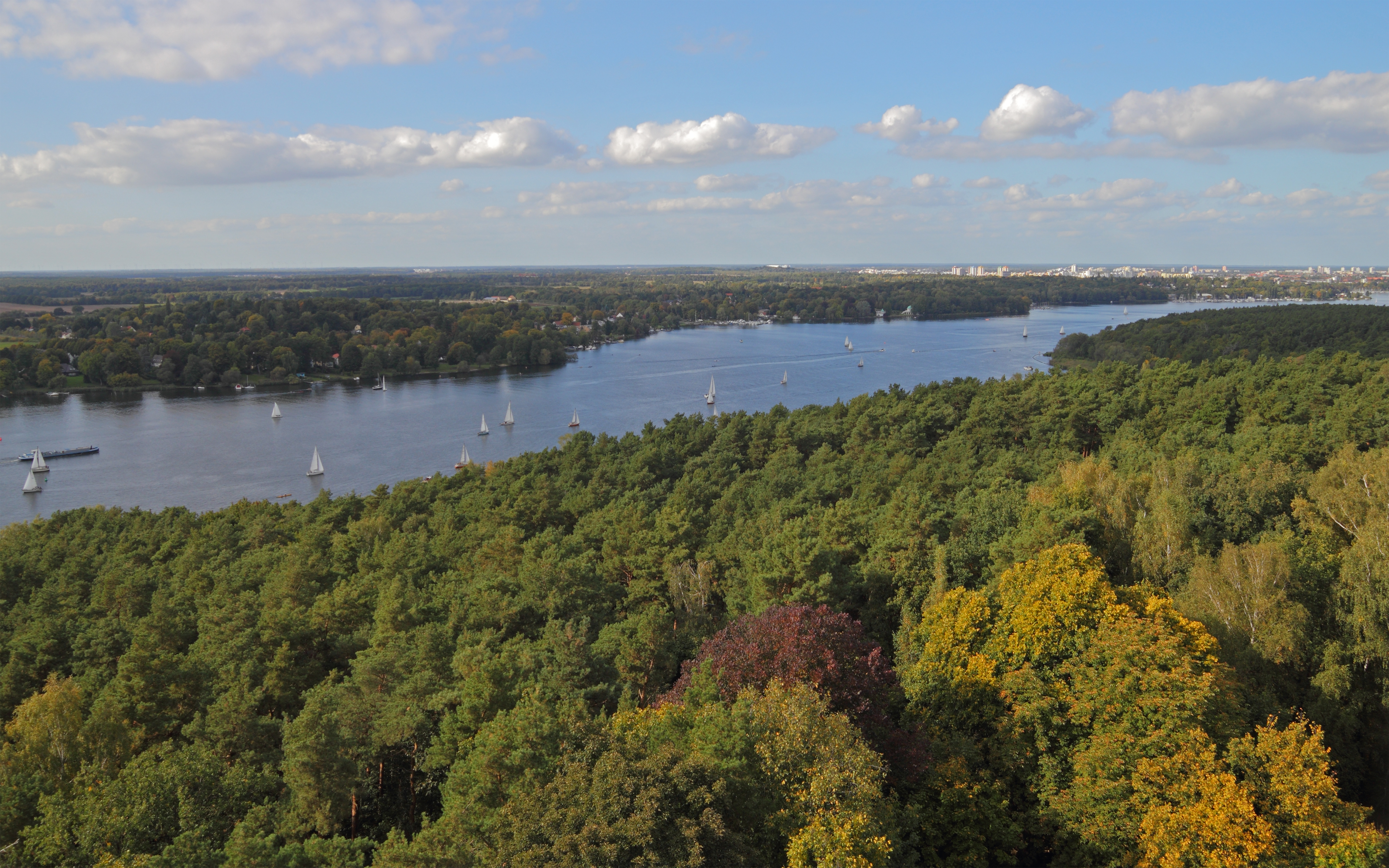
View of Grunewald and Havel from Grunewaldturm

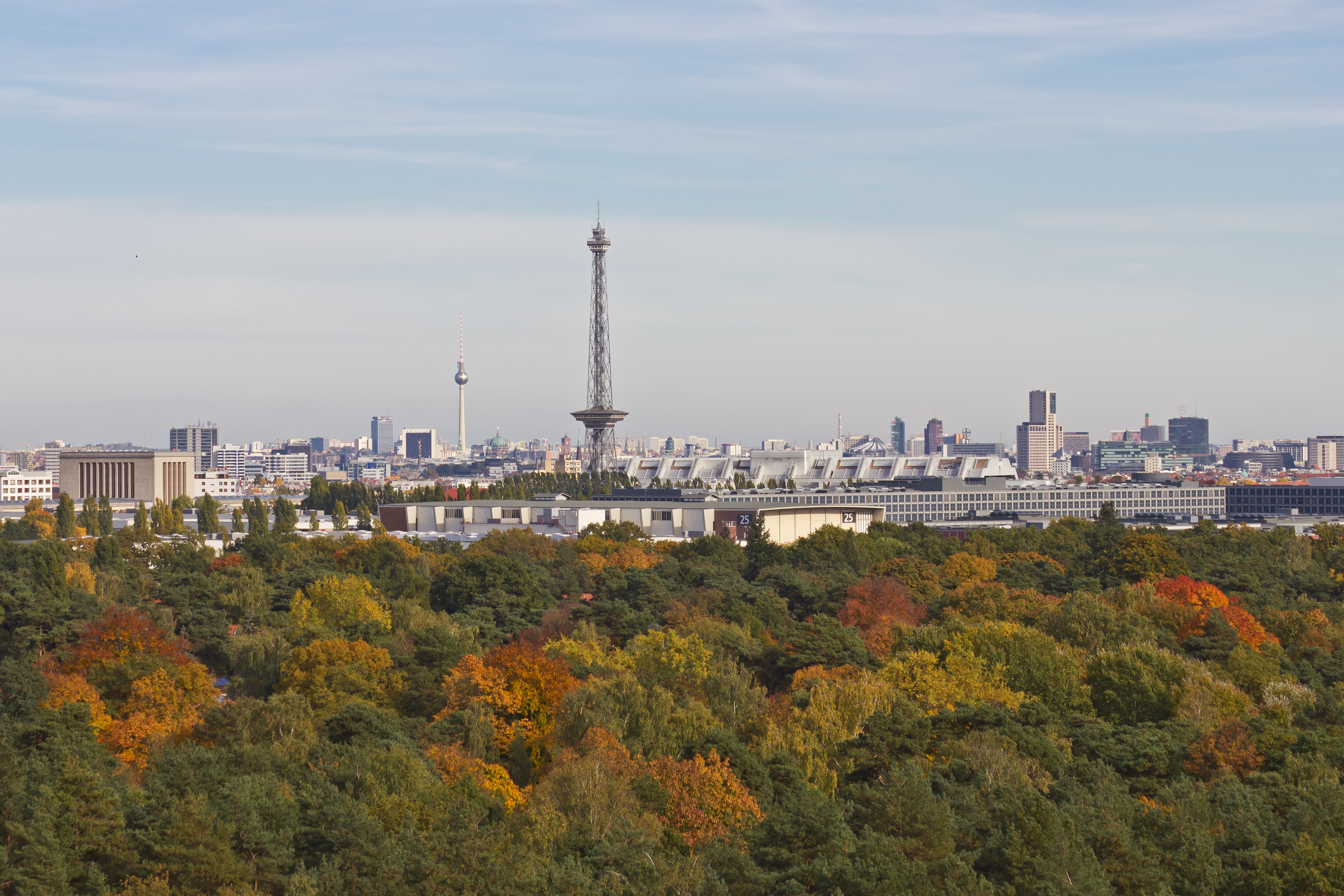
View from Drachenberg (Kite Hill)

== See also ==
- Grunewald (locality)
- Grunewald Railway Station
- Grunewaldturm
- Teufelsberg
