= Grunewald Tower =

Observation tower in Berlin

Coordinates: 52°28′42″N 13°11′48″E

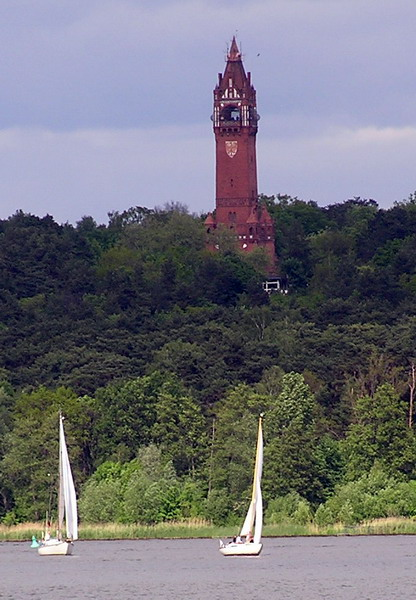
Grunewaldturm and River Havel in Berlin

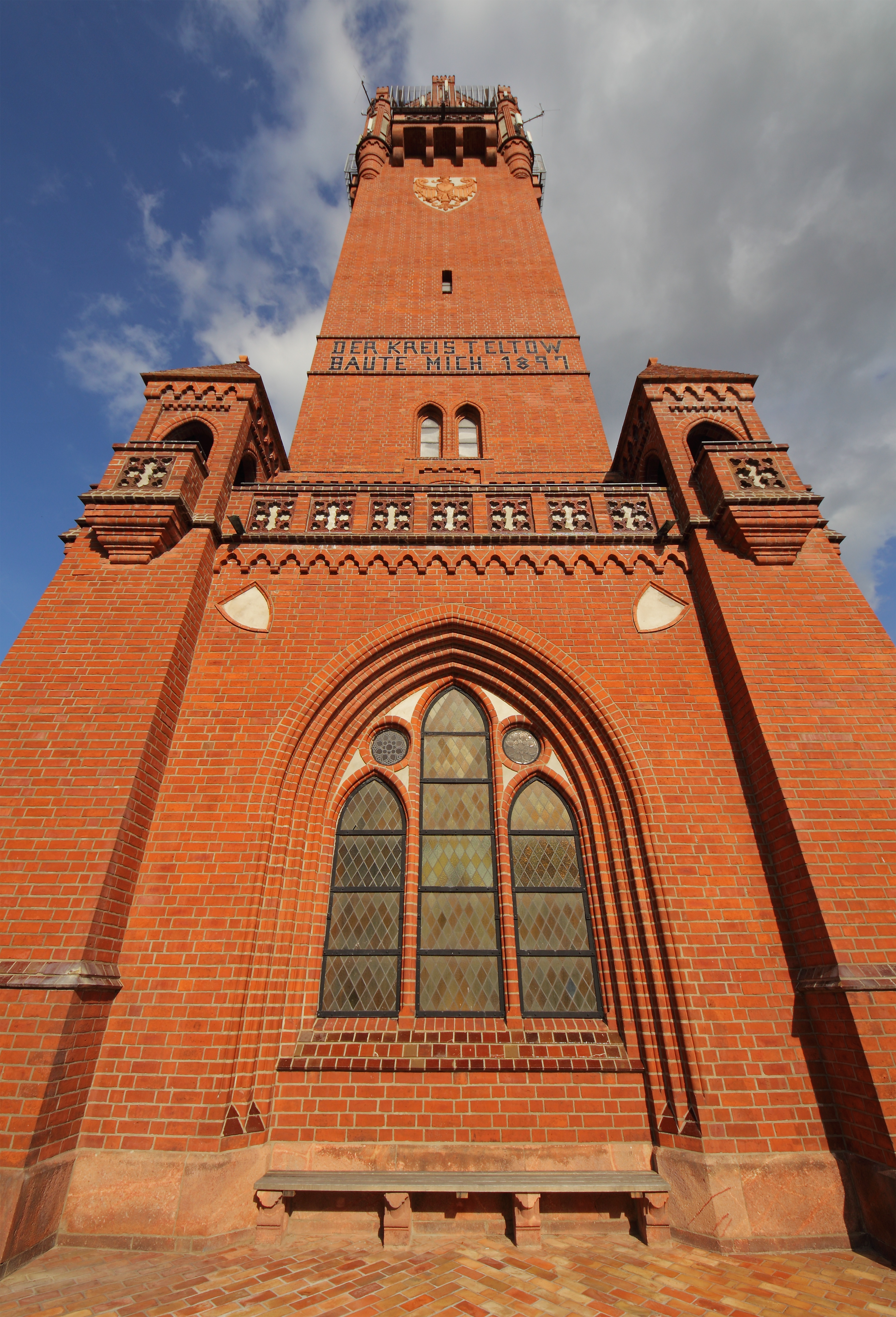
The western facade

The Grunewald Tower or Grunewaldturm is a historical tower in the Grunewald forest of southwestern Berlin, Germany, built in 1897-99 according to plans designed by Franz Heinrich Schwechten. The viewing platform offers a view over the Havel at a height of 36 metres (118 ft).

== Overview ==
In 1897 Teltow, a rural district of the Province of Brandenburg, mandated the construction of a memorial tower to mark the 100th birthday of the German Emperor Wilhelm I (d. 1888). On June 9, 1899 the landmark was opened to the public as "Kaiser-Wilhelm-Turm" (English: Emperor William Tower), though the inscription on the eastern facade reads "Koenig Wilhelm I zum Gedaechtniss" (to King William I, in memory), as he was also king of Prussia. A second inscription, on the western facade, facing the Havel river, reads: "Der Kreis Teltow baute mich 1897" (The district of Teltow built me in 1897).

Elizabeth of Wied, queen consort of Romania, visited the top of the tower in March 1916, during World War I. She was elderly and it took her over two and a half hours to make it to the top, from which she waved at a crowd of about 350 people below. Elizabeth, who was an accomplished writer and translator, died the following day.

In 1948, following World War II, the tower was renamed Grunewaldturm, after the surrounding forest, near the Havel River. A comprehensive renovation of the tower then took place in 1953. It was later closed in October 2007 due to significant structural damage to the staircase. The necessary renovation cost 1.5 million euros and lasted until Easter 2011, reopening on April 22.

Since the 1990s, the tower has also doubled as a cell tower.

== Architecture ==
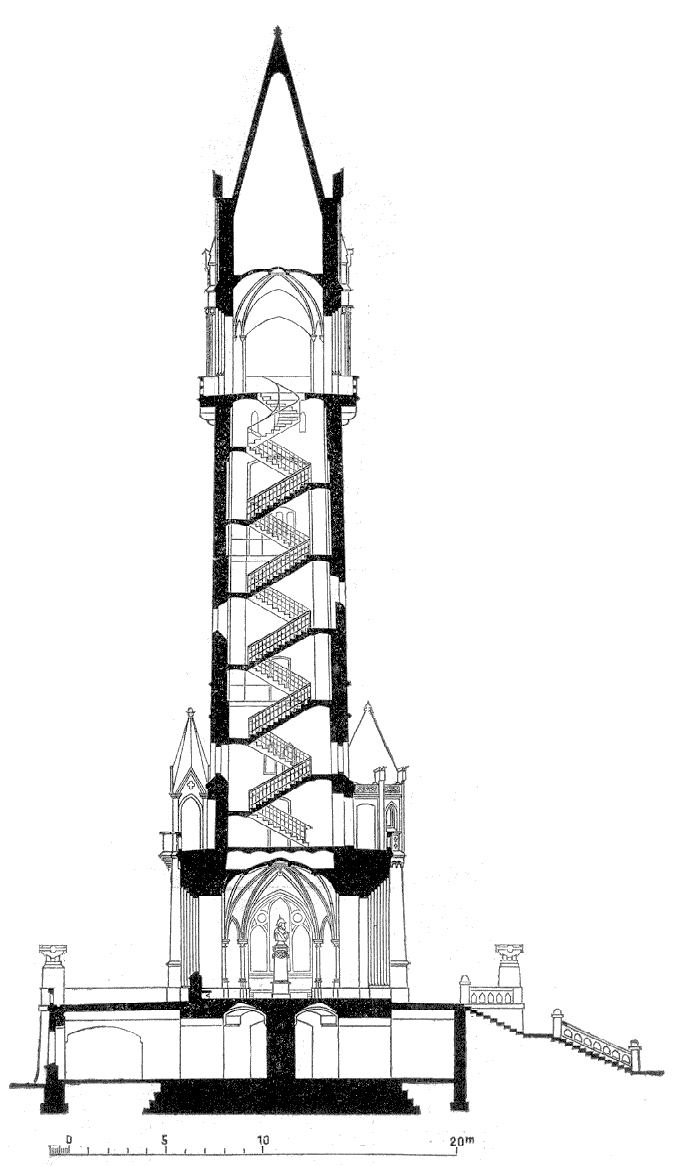
Cross section through the tower

The tower, built in Brick Gothic Revival style and designed by Franz Schwechten, stands 55 m (180 ft) high and is located on the 79 m (259 ft) high Karlsberg hill of the Teltow plateau on the eastern shore of the Havel. The building contains a domed memorial hall with a marble statue of Wilhelm I by sculptor Ludwig Manzel, and four iron reliefs depicting Albrecht von Roon, Helmuth von Moltke, Otto von Bismarck and Prince Frederick Charles of Prussia. The neo-Byzantine ceiling mosaics in the hall are early works by the church painter and mosaic artist August Oetken, executed by the company Puhl & Wagner.

A decorative band, wraps around the tower. Inscriptions are on the east and west sides, with two coats of arms located above them. The coat of arms on the side facing the river shows the red Brandenburg eagle, while the one facing the forest has the black Prussian eagle.

204 steps lead to a platform offering a panoramic view over the Havelland region and the Grunewald forest. The building has a restaurant and a beer garden.

== See also ==
- Grunewald (locality)
- List of towers
