= Grunewald (locality) =

- Quarter of Berlin
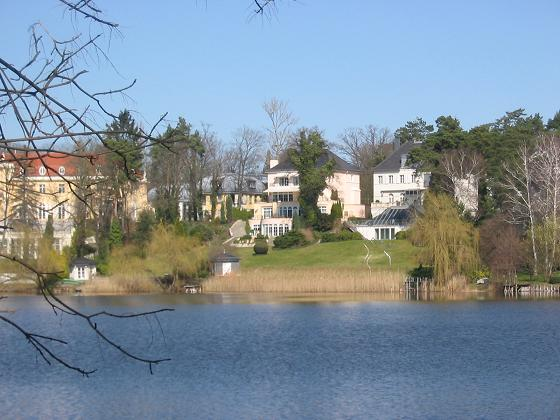
- Mansions at Hundekehlsee

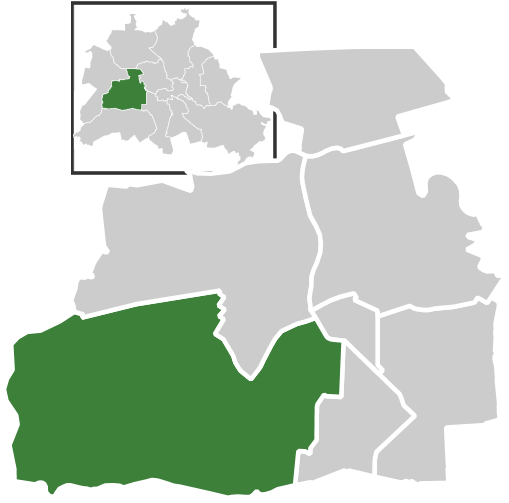
- Location of Grunewald in Charlottenburg-Wilmersdorf and Berlin
- Interactive map of Grunewald
- Location within Germany Location within Berlin
- Coordinates: 52°29′0″N 13°15′57″E
- Country: Germany
- State: Berlin
- City: Berlin
- Borough: Charlottenburg-Wilmersdorf
- Founded: 1880

Area
  - Total: 22.3 km^{2} (8.6 sq mi)
- Elevation: 52 m (171 ft)

Population (2024-12-31)
  - Total: 11,154
  - Density: 500/km^{2} (1,300/sq mi)
- Time zone: UTC+01:00 (CET)
  - Summer (DST): UTC+02:00 (CEST)
- Postal codes: 14193
- Vehicle registration: B

Grunewald (German: [ˈɡʁuːnəˌvalt]) is a locality within the Berlin borough of Charlottenburg-Wilmersdorf. Until 2001 administrative reform it was part of the former district of Wilmersdorf.

Grunewald forest lies partly within the locality and is Berlin's largest green area. Next to Lichterfelde West, Dahlem and Westend, it is part of the affluent Berlin "Villenbogen", a row of suburbs completely made up of 19th century mansions.

== Geography ==
The locality is situated in the western side of the city and is separated from Spandau by the river Havel. It borders with the localities of Westend, Halensee, Schmargendorf, Wilhelmstadt, Gatow (both in Spandau district), Nikolassee, Zehlendorf and Dahlem (all three in Steglitz-Zehlendorf district). The Grunewald forest is 10 km away from Berlin-Mitte.

== History ==
=== Etymology ===
The name derives from the Grunewald hunting lodge of 1543, the oldest preserved castle in Berlin, which is, however, physically located within the adjacent Dahlem locality. It was erected in an Early Renaissance style by order of Elector Joachim II Hector of Brandenburg and named Zum Gruenen Wald, the umlaut spelt with a following "e" instead of a diacritic as depicted above the main entrance. A corduroy road leading from the Berlin Stadtschloss to the lodge was laid out, which later would be known as the Kurfürstendamm boulevard.

=== Overview ===
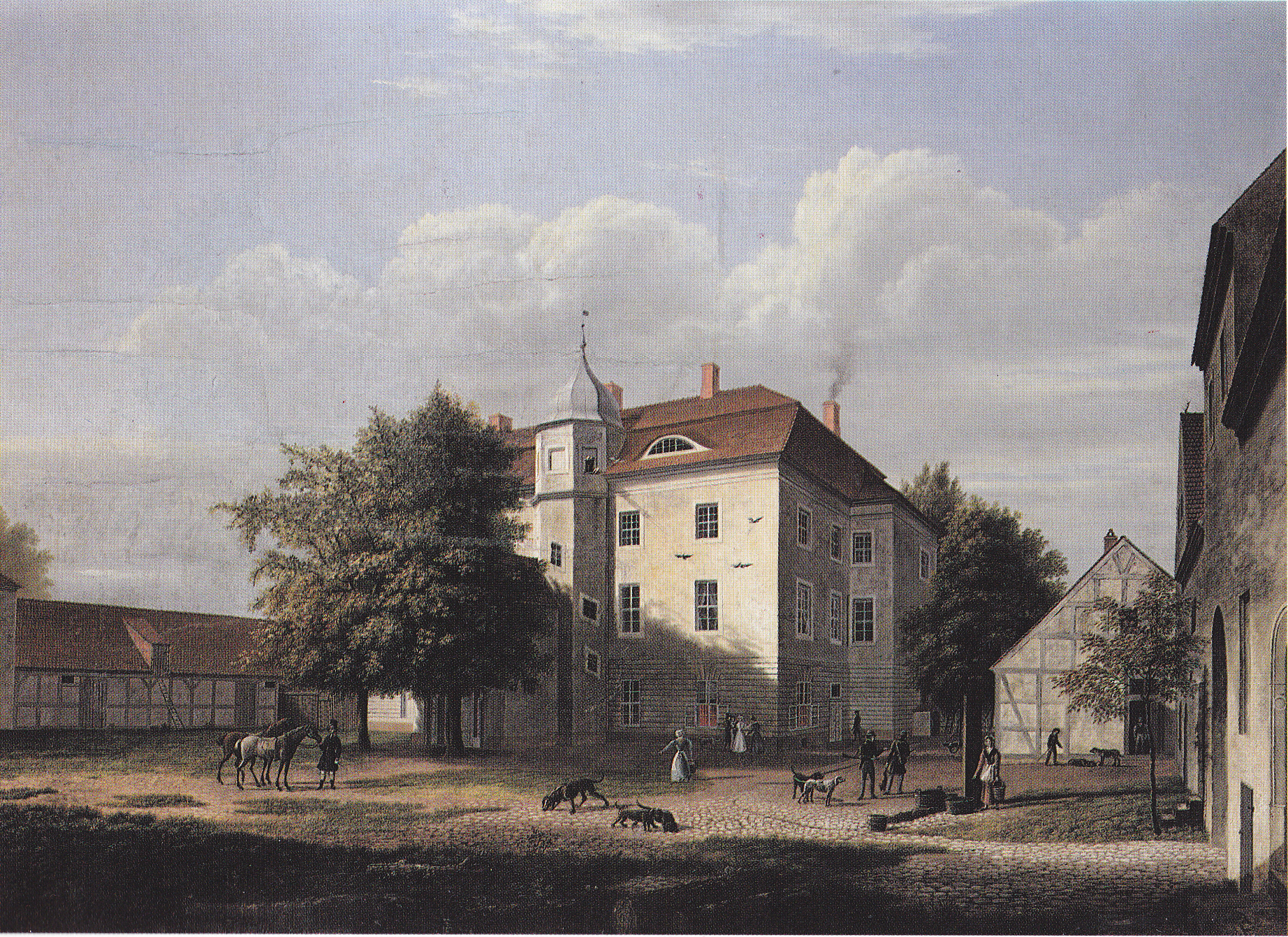
Grunewald hunting lodge, oil on canvas, Wilhelm Barth, 1832

The neighbourhood developed out of a so-called "mansion colony" at the western end of the Kurfürstendamm. Promoted by Otto von Bismarck, Grunewald was found to be a preferred residential area from the 1880s onward. Grunewald was incorporated into Greater Berlin in 1920. Today, the social structure of Grunewald is still influenced by these origins. The Rot-Weiss Tennis Club, home of the WTA Tour German Open, has been located in the district since 1897.

On 24 June 1922 Foreign Minister of Germany Walther Rathenau was assassinated by ultra-nationalist radicals of the Organisation Consul in a curve of the main street called Koenigsallee. A memorial stone marks the scene of the crime.

Since 1981 the Grunewald district is the home of the Institute for Advanced Study, Berlin. It also houses the embassies of Afghanistan, Azerbaijan, Qatar, Kuwait, Laos, North Macedonia, Poland and Serbia.

Within the Grunewald forest lies the artificial Teufelsberg hill, once a listening station of the US National Security Agency. On the shore of the Havel, the Grunewaldturm, built by Franz Heinrich Schwechten in 1898, offers views over the Havelland region.

=== Deportation memorial ===
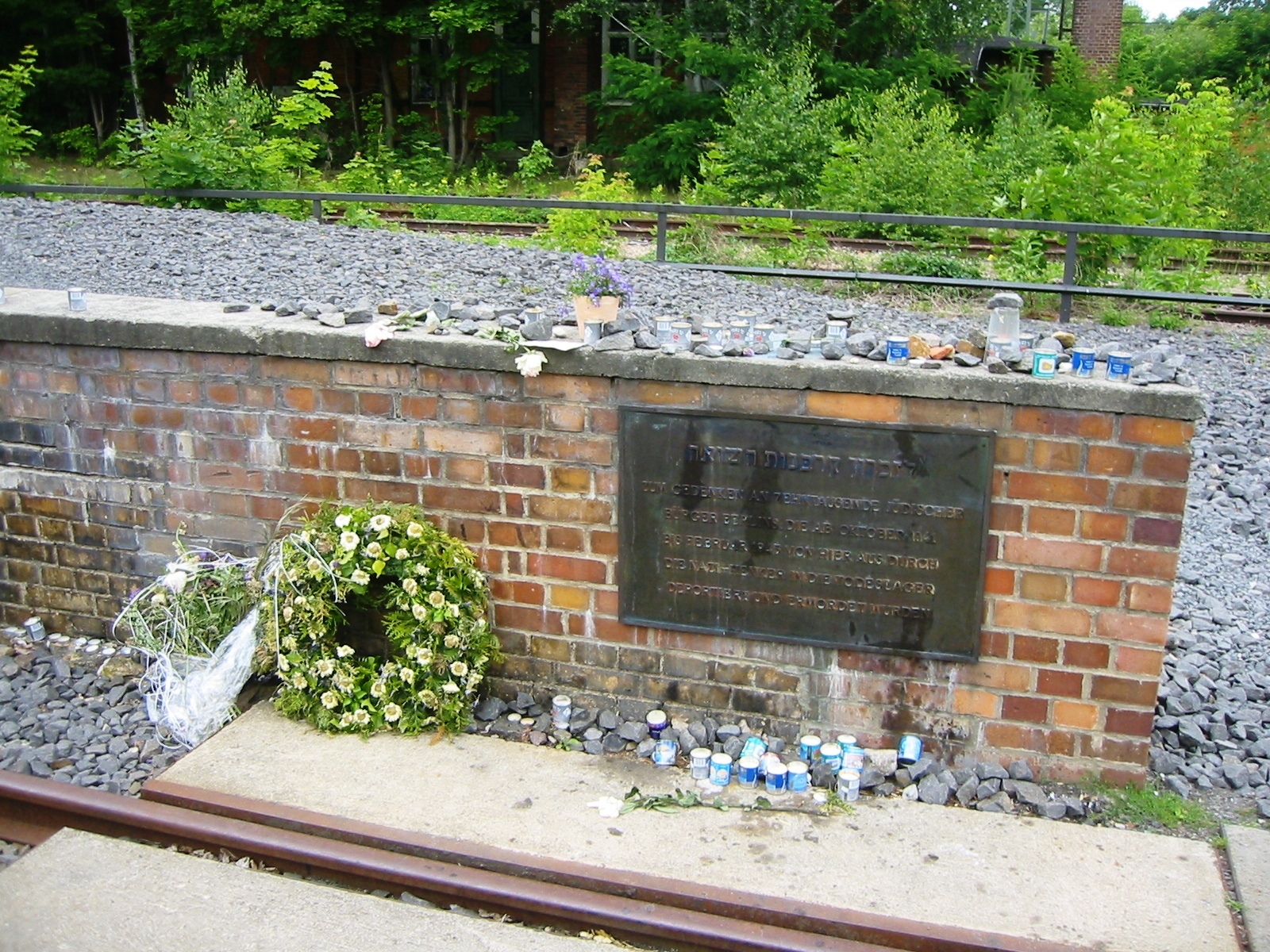
Memorial plaque, Berlin-Grunewald station

Between October 1941 and February 1945 more than 50,000 Jews were deported by German Nazis to extermination camps from the Grunewald freight railway station and murdered. Memorials from the district of Charlottenburg-Wilmersdorf and the Deutsche Bahn ("Gleis 17") commemorate this spot in Grunewald's history. The area is accessible by the Berlin-Grunewald station.

== Transport ==
Grunewald railway station is served by the S7 line of the Berlin S-Bahn, which connects the locality to Berlin Mitte, Ahrensfelde and Potsdam.

One of Germany's busiest freeways, the AVUS Autobahn, runs through the locality and was used as a marathon and bike path during the 1936 Summer Olympics.

== Notable residents ==
- Fritz Ascher, Bismarckallee 26
- Berthold Auerbach, Auerbacher Straße
- Ingeborg Bachmann, Hasensprung 2, Koenigsallee 35
- Vicki Baum, Koenigsallee 43–45
- Walter Benjamin, Delbrückstraße 23
- Dietrich Bonhoeffer, Wangenheimstraße 14
- Arno Breker, Koenigsallee 65
- Bernhard Brink
- Sarah Connor
- Isadora Duncan
- Paul van Dyk
- Lion Feuchtwanger, Regerstraße
- Samuel von Fischer, Erdener Straße 8
- Carl Fürstenberg, Koenigsallee 53
- Maximilian Harden, Wernerstraße 16
- Gerhart Hauptmann, Trabener Straße, Hubertusallee
- Heinrich Himmler, Hagenstraße 22
- Engelbert Humperdinck, Trabener Straße
- Harald Juhnke, Richard-Strauss-Straße 26, Lassenstraße 1
- Helmut Käutner, Koenigsallee 18g
- Alfred Kerr, Gneiststraße 9, Höhmannstraße 6, Douglasstraße 10
- Harry Graf Kessler, Höhmannstraße 6
- Hildegard Knef, Bettinastraße 12, Brahmsstraße 12
- Else Lasker-Schüler, Humboldtstraße 13
- Otto Lessing (sculptor), Wangenheimstraße 10
- Brigitte Mira, Koenigsallee 83
- Friedrich Olbricht, Wildpfad
- Ernst Oppler and Alexander Oppler, Hagenstraße 8
- Max Pechstein,
- Max Planck, Wangenheimstraße 21
- Walther Rathenau, Koenigsallee 65
- Max Reinhardt, Fontanestraße 8
- Ferdinand Sauerbruch, Herthastraße 11
- Ulrich Schamoni, Furtwänglerstraße 19
- Romy Schneider, Winkler Straße 22
- Angelika Schrobsdorff, Johannaplatz 3
- Olli Schulz
- Werner Sombart, Humboldtstraße 35a
- Hermann Sudermann, Bettinastraße 3
- Grethe Weiser, Herthastraße 17a

== Forest ==
The forest of Grunewald, is located mainly in the quarter but also in Nikolassee, Zehlendorf, Dahlem and Westend is, with an area of 3,000 ha, the largest green area in the city of Berlin.

== See also ==
- Grunewald Railway Station
- Holocaust Memorial "Track 17" at Grunewald station
