= T. H. E. Hill =

American author

- Born: 1948 (age 77–78)
- Education: Indiana University, DLIWC, USARI
- Occupations: Intelligence officer, author
- Writing career
- Pen name: Thomas Heinrich Edward Hill, a.k.a. T. H. E. Hill
- Period: Cold War
- Genre: Spy fiction
- Notable works: Voices Under Berlin; The Day Before the Berlin Wall
- Notable awards: Hollywood Book Festival; 2008 Voices Under Berlin
- Website: www.voicesunderberlin.com

Thomas Heinrich Edward Hill, or T. H. E. Hill (born 1948), is a pseudonymous American novelist who writes mostly in the genre of spy fiction. His first novel was published when he was 60 years old, after a career that was spent in military intelligence.

== Military career ==
Hill has three degrees from the West Coast branch of the Defense Language Institute. He is also an alumnus of The U.S. Army Russian Institute.

He served at United States Army Security Agency Field Station Berlin in the mid-1970s. His pen name is a reference to the Field Station Berlin operations site, which was referred to as "The Hill" by those who worked there. ("The Hill" was in fact a common appellation for SIGINT sites at other locations.)

Hill retired in 1993, following 26 years of combined uniformed and civilian service, 16 of it overseas.

== Writing career ==
Hill's first novel was Voices Under Berlin: The Tale of a Monterey Mary, published in 2008. It is a fictionalized story of the Berlin Spy Tunnel (Operation Gold, covername: PBJOINTLY). This was a COMINT, as opposed to a HUMINT operation, which makes the novel different from most spy fiction. Voices Under Berlin was an award winner at the Hollywood Book Festival in 2008. Since then it has garnered an additional five awards. Most recently, it was included in the Indie 500 Booklist for 2011.

Hill's second novel, The Day Before the Berlin Wall, is an alternate history of the lead-up to the construction of the Berlin Wall, based on a legend that was still being told in the mid-1970s, by U.S. Army soldiers stationed in Berlin. According to the legend, the U.S. had advance intelligence of the plans to build the wall. This information included the fact that the East-German engineer troops who were going to build it had been told to halt construction if the Americans were to take aggressive action to stop them. This novel has so far won two awards, the most recent being the Stars & Flags Book Award for Historical Fiction.

Hill was awarded the TANS “Recommended Reading” award for published authors in the 2012 Old Spooks and Spies Short-Story Contest for his story "Lieutenant Bar".

Hill's third novel, Reunification: A Monterey Mary Returns to Berlin, was published in 2013, on the occasion of the 50th anniversary of the first permanent buildings on Teufelsberg, the operational home of Field Station Berlin. The novel is set in Berlin after the fall of the Berlin Wall. The main characters are an American who used to be stationed in Berlin and his old "long-haired dictionary,” who is not thrilled to see him again. The novel is a juxtaposition of Berlin in the 1970s with Berlin in the 2010s, spiced up with stories of American intelligence escapades. The novel explores the difficulties of post-reunification reconciliation, both within Germany and between Germany and the United States.

== Graphic design ==
In addition to being an author, T. H. E. Hill is a graphic artist. He specializes in military themes. Hill has designed four sheets of commemorative Cinderella stamps:

- Americans in Berlin for the Twentieth Anniversary of the Fall of the Berlin Wall,
- Fiftieth Anniversary of the U-2 Incident, in which Francis Gary Powers was shot down over the Soviet Union.
- Fiftieth Anniversary of the Construction of the Berlin Wall
- Fiftieth Anniversary (1963-2013) of the construction of the permanent buildings for Field Station Berlin atop Teufelsberg, the operational home of Field Station Berlin.

Hill's stamps are a part of the collections of The Allied Museum in Berlin, The Wende Museum in California, and the Artistamp Museum in Florida.

Hill is also the creator of "The Great Army SIGINT Seal".
