= Teufelssee =

- Teufelssee (German)
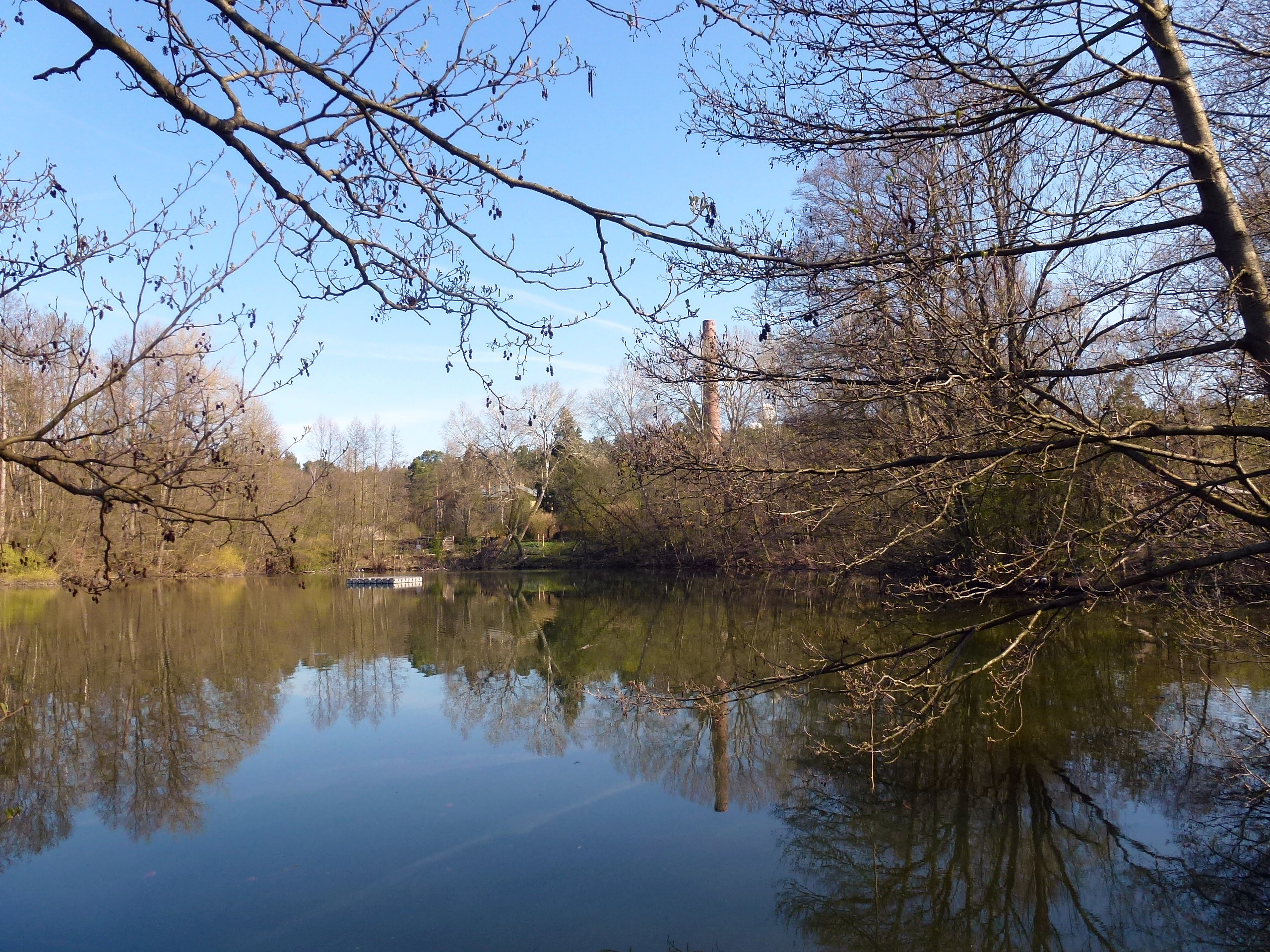

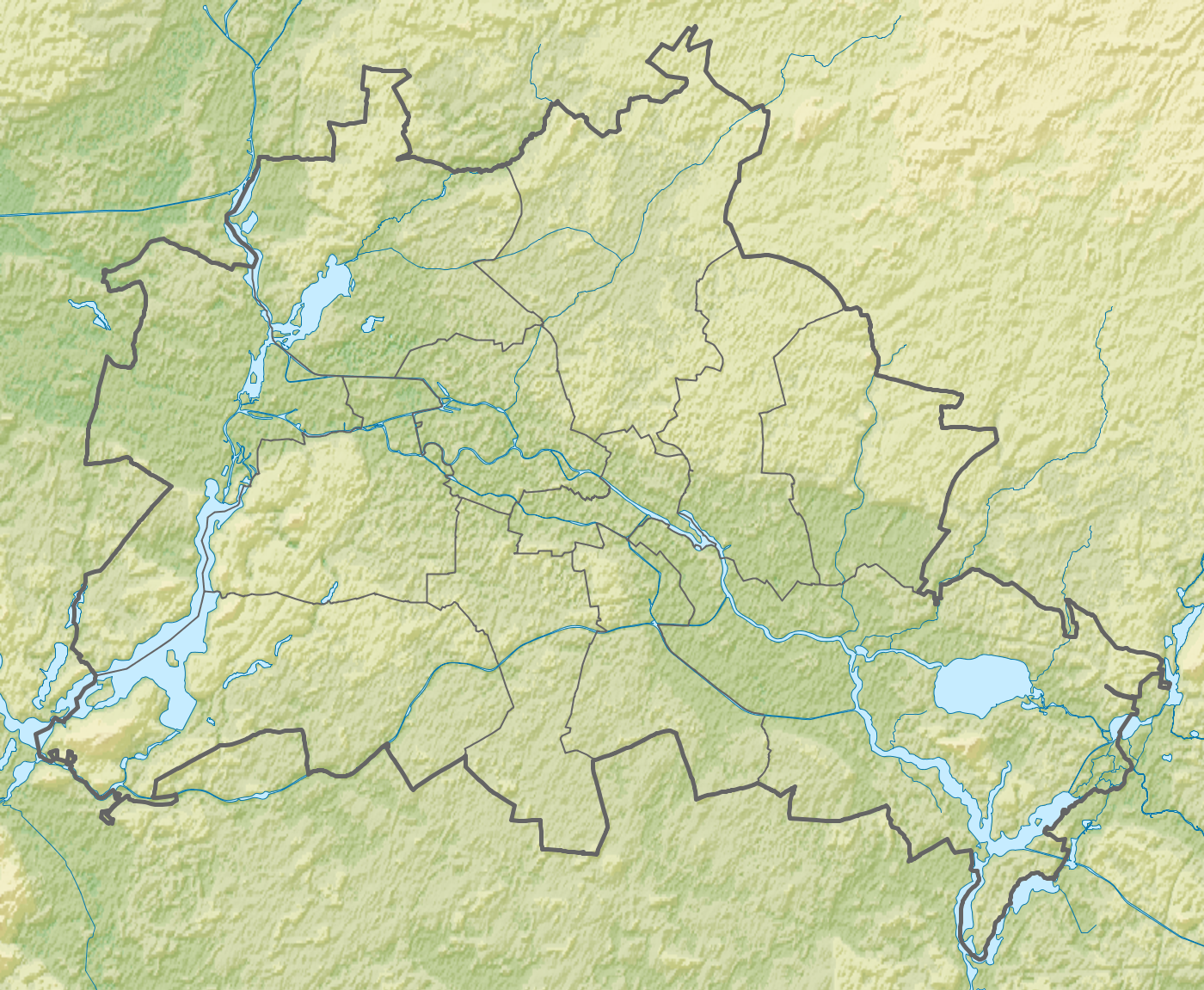
- Location within Berlin Location within Germany
- Location: Grunewald forest, Charlottenburg-Wilmersdorf, Berlin, Germany
- Coordinates: 52°29′28″N 13°14′01″E
- Type: glacial lake
- Max. length: 254 metres (833 ft)
- Max. width: 107 metres (351 ft)
- Surface area: 2.1 hectares (5.2 acres)
- Max. depth: 5.9 metres (19 ft)
- Water volume: 72,600 cubic metres (2,560,000 cu ft)

Teufelssee (German, 'Devil's Lake') is a glacial lake in the Grunewald forest in the Berlin borough of Charlottenburg-Wilmersdorf.

The Teufelssee in Grunewald forest is not to be confused with the lake of the same name in the Berlin district of Köpenick.

Nude bathing is permitted at the lake as in many parts of Germany.

The lake's western and northern banks belong to the Teufelsfenn and thus to the 13.1-hectare Postfenn and Teufelsfenn nature reserve. The southern shore is a swimming area.

The oldest surviving waterworks in Berlin, the Teufelssee waterworks built in 1872-3, are located on the east bank. The waterworks were decommissioned in 1969, and today belong to the Naturschutzzentrum Ökowerk Berlin.

To the north-east is Teufelsberg, an artificial hill made from heaped-up rubble of the Second World War.

Teufelssee is of Ice Age origin. It lies in the Teufelssee-Pechsee-Barssee channel, a glacial meltwater channel. All of the lakes in the channel with no outflow were created by dead ice.

== Environmental protection ==
Teufelssee was first designated as a nature reserve by the Senate in 1960. The designation was renewed in 1986 and incorporated into the Postfenn and Teufelsfenn nature reserve in 2007. The lake is also part of the Grunewald fauna-flora habitat.

The European bitterling, classified as "very vulnerable" in Germany, can be found in the lake, where it forms a symbiosis with swan mussels and painter mussels; fishing is prohibited by law.

The protected part of the bank is delimited by fences and signposted on the land side; swimming is forbidden in this part of the lake, which is indicated by a chain of buoys on the water side.

To prevent the water level in the lake from dropping, groundwater is fed into Teufelssee; the groundwater feed not only supports the water balance of the Teufelssee, but also wets the adjacent Teufelsfenn moor and preserves it as a valuable biotope.

== Bathing ==
The south and south-east banks of the Teufelssee, along with a large part of the water surface, are not part of the nature reserve and are used for swimming.

At the sunbathing area, nudists and non-nudists are both permitted. There are only toilet containers and no showers.

The lake shore in the bathing area drops off quite steeply. There is a floating plastic pontoon in the middle of the lake.

== Water quality ==
The lake has clean, clear-to-cloudy, and relatively low-oxygen water. The water hygiene specialist group of the Landesamt für Gesundheit und Soziales Berlin (LAGeSo) monitors bathing water quality from April to September. Despite the existence of a toilet container, LAGeSo assumes that faeces will get into the lake from bathers. Animal faeces (wild boar and dog faeces) that are washed in and washed in can also lead to bacteriological and microbiological contamination. The bathing water quality is classified as excellent. The lake has a low visibility depth of up to 40 cm, however since 2006 improvements in visibility depths have been observed.

Dogs are not allowed at Teufelssee itself and dogs must be kept on a leash on the surrounding paths.

== Culture ==
In August 2020, a photo taken by actress Adele Landauer on the lake's nudist beach received global coverage. The photograph shows a naked man running after a wild boar and her piglets — according to Landauer, the man was chasing the animals because the sow was carrying his bag and laptop in her mouth. This wild boar appears as a character in the 2026 novel, The Living Realm, by Jordan Tannahill, which is set principally at Teufelssee.
