= Teufelsberg =

Non-natural hill in Berlin, Germany

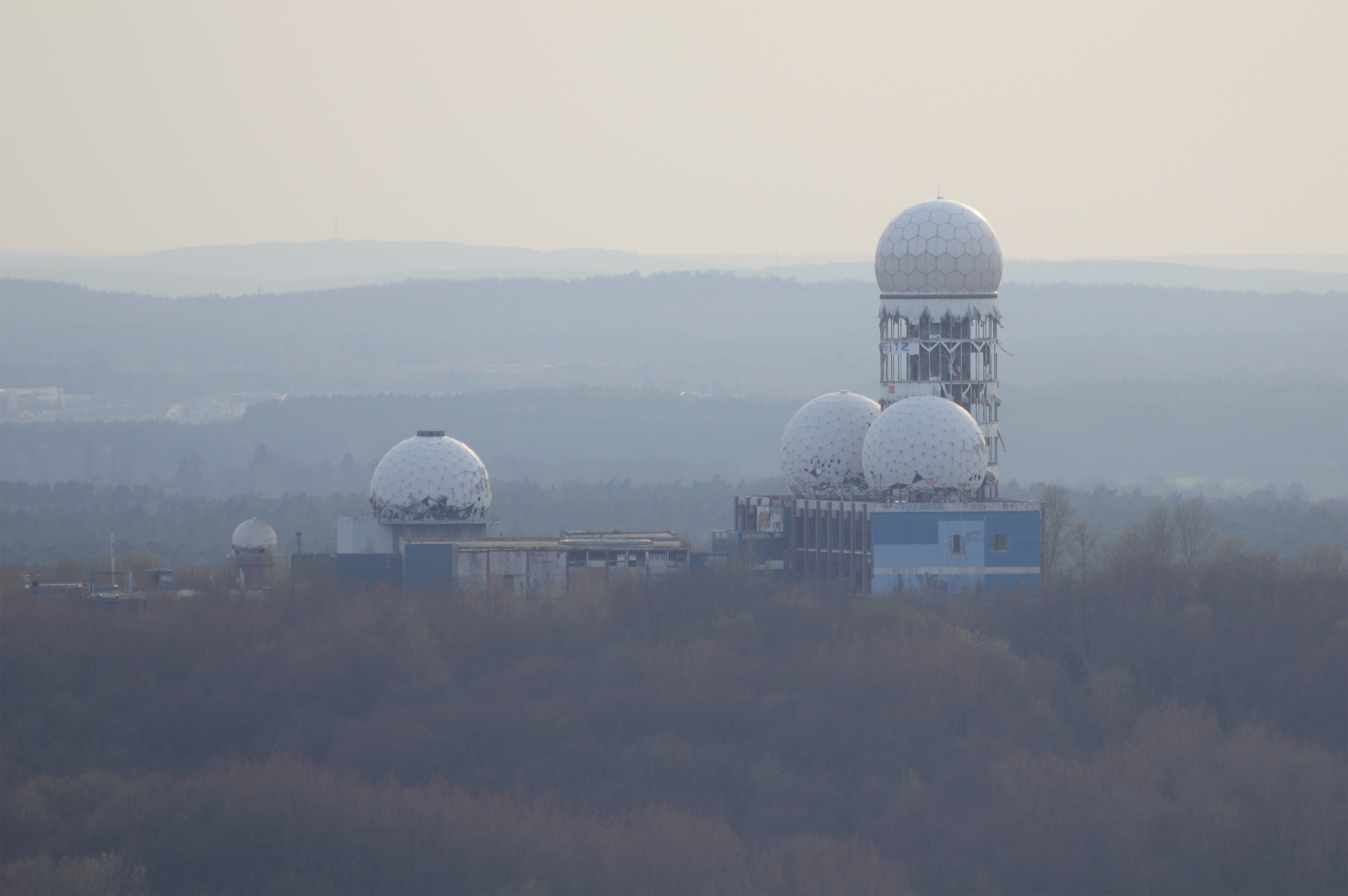
- Former US listening station on the top of the hill

Highest point
- Elevation: 120.1 m (394 ft)
- Coordinates: 52°29′51″N 13°14′28″E

Naming
- English translation: Devil's Mountain
- Language of name: German

Geography
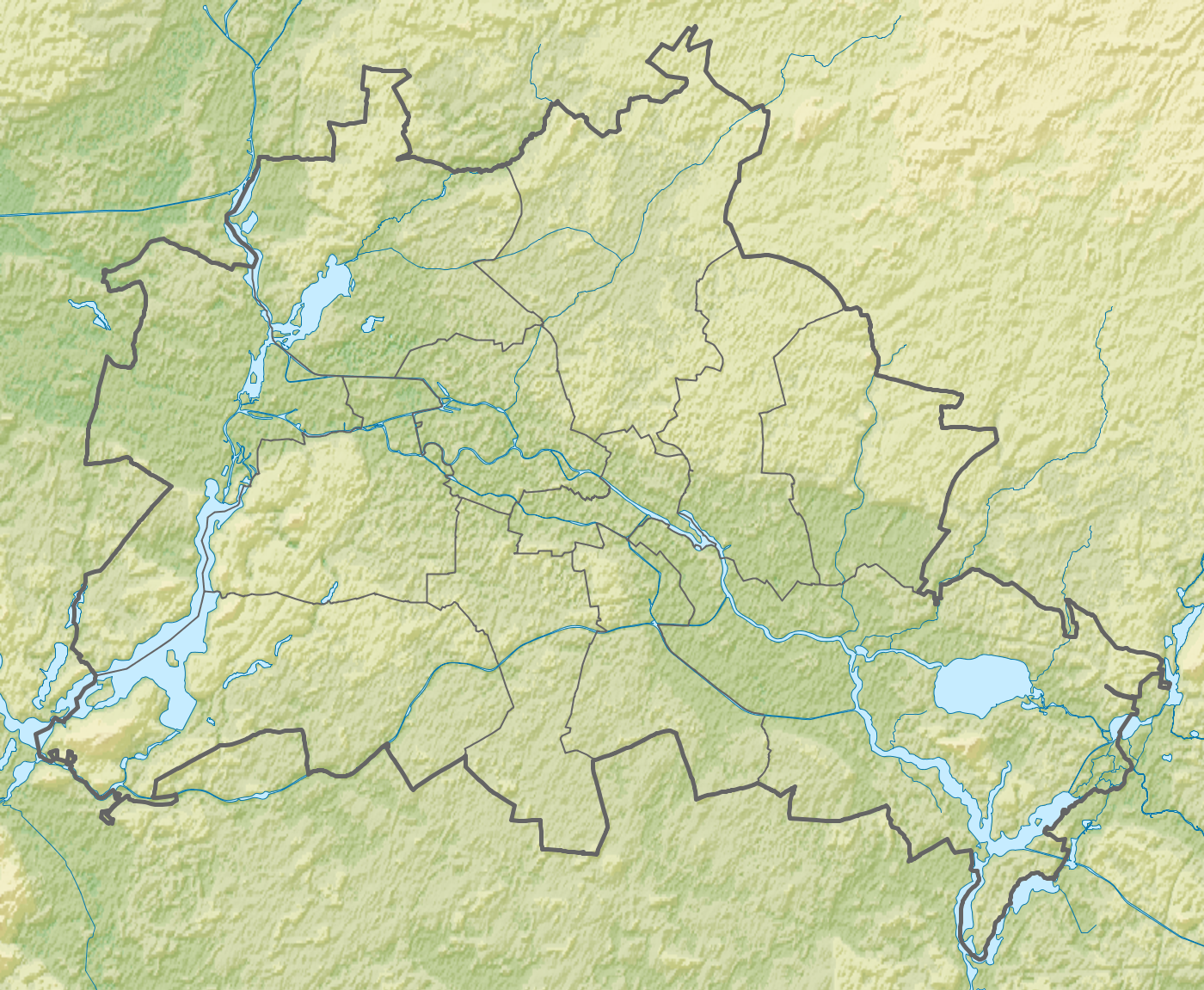
- Location within Berlin
- Location: Berlin, Germany

Teufelsberg (German: [ˈtɔʏfl̩sbɛʁk]; German for Devil's Hill) is a non-natural hill in Berlin, Germany, in the Grunewald locality of former West Berlin. It rises about 80 metres (260 ft) above the surrounding Teltow plateau and 120.1 metres (394 ft) above the sea level, in the north of Berlin's Grunewald Forest. It was named after the Teufelssee (Devil's Lake) in its southerly vicinity. The hill is made of debris and rubble, and covers an unfinished Nazi military-technical college (Wehrtechnische Fakultät). During the Cold War, there was a U.S. and British listening station on the hill, Field Station Berlin. The site of the former field station is now fenced off and is currently being managed by an organisation which charges 12 euros for public access.

== History ==
Teufelsberg is a non-natural hill, created in the 20 years following the Second World War by moving approximately 75 million m^{3} (98 million cu yd) of debris from Berlin.

After the Communist putsch in the city parliament of Greater Berlin (for all four sectors of Berlin) in September 1948, separate parliaments and magistrates (German: Magistrat von Groß-Berlin; city government) were formed for East and West Berlin. This also ended much of the cooperation between West Berlin and the state of Brandenburg, surrounding West Berlin in the North, West and South.

While part of the rubble from destroyed quarters in East Berlin was deposited outside the city boundary, all the debris from West Berlin had to be dumped within the western boundary. Due to the shortage of fuel in West Berlin, the rubble transport stopped during the Berlin Blockade.

Although there are many similar man-made rubble mounds in Germany (see Schuttberg) and other war-torn cities of Europe, Teufelsberg is unique in that the never completed Nazi military-technical college (Wehrtechnische Fakultät) designed by Albert Speer is buried beneath. The Allies tried using explosives to demolish the school, but it was so sturdy that covering it with debris turned out to be easier. In June 1950 the West Berlin Magistrate decided to open a new rubble disposal on that site. The disposal was planned for 12 million m^{3} (16 million cu yd).

With the end of material shortages after the blockade, an average of 600 trucks deposited 6,800 m^{3} (8,900 cu yd) of material daily. On 14 November 1957, the ten millionth cubic metre arrived. The site was closed to dumping in 1972, leaving approximately 26 million cubic metres (34 million cubic yards) of debris, and to a lesser extent construction waste. The Senate of (West) Berlin opted to plant greenery on the hill as a beautification project.

Teufelsberg was originally thought to be 115 metres (377 ft) high, which placed it at the same elevation as Großer Müggelberg (the summit of Müggelberge), and was the highest point in West Berlin. New measurements show that Teufelsberg is actually 120.1 metres (394 ft) high, making it higher than Großer Müggelberg.

In February 1955, a 24 m long (79 ft) ski jump opened on the hill, designed by the ski jumper and architect Heini Klopfer. A larger ski jump opened March 4, 1962, offering space for 5,000 spectators. Ski jumping ceased in 1969, allowing the ski jumps to fall into decay. The jumps were removed in 1999.

Teufelsberg has been a location for several recent movies and television programmes, such as The Gamblers, Berlin Station, Covert Affairs (second-season episode titled "Uberlin") and We Are the Night in which the finale takes place on Teufelsberg.

As in the whole of Grunewald Forest, wild boar frequently roam the hill.

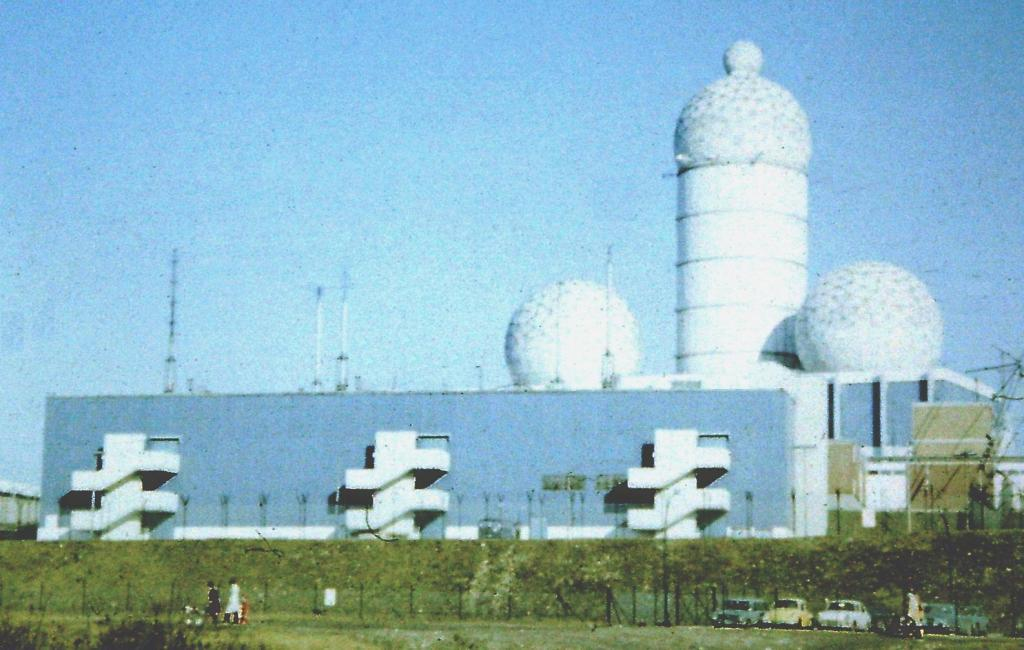
The listening station radomes in 1974

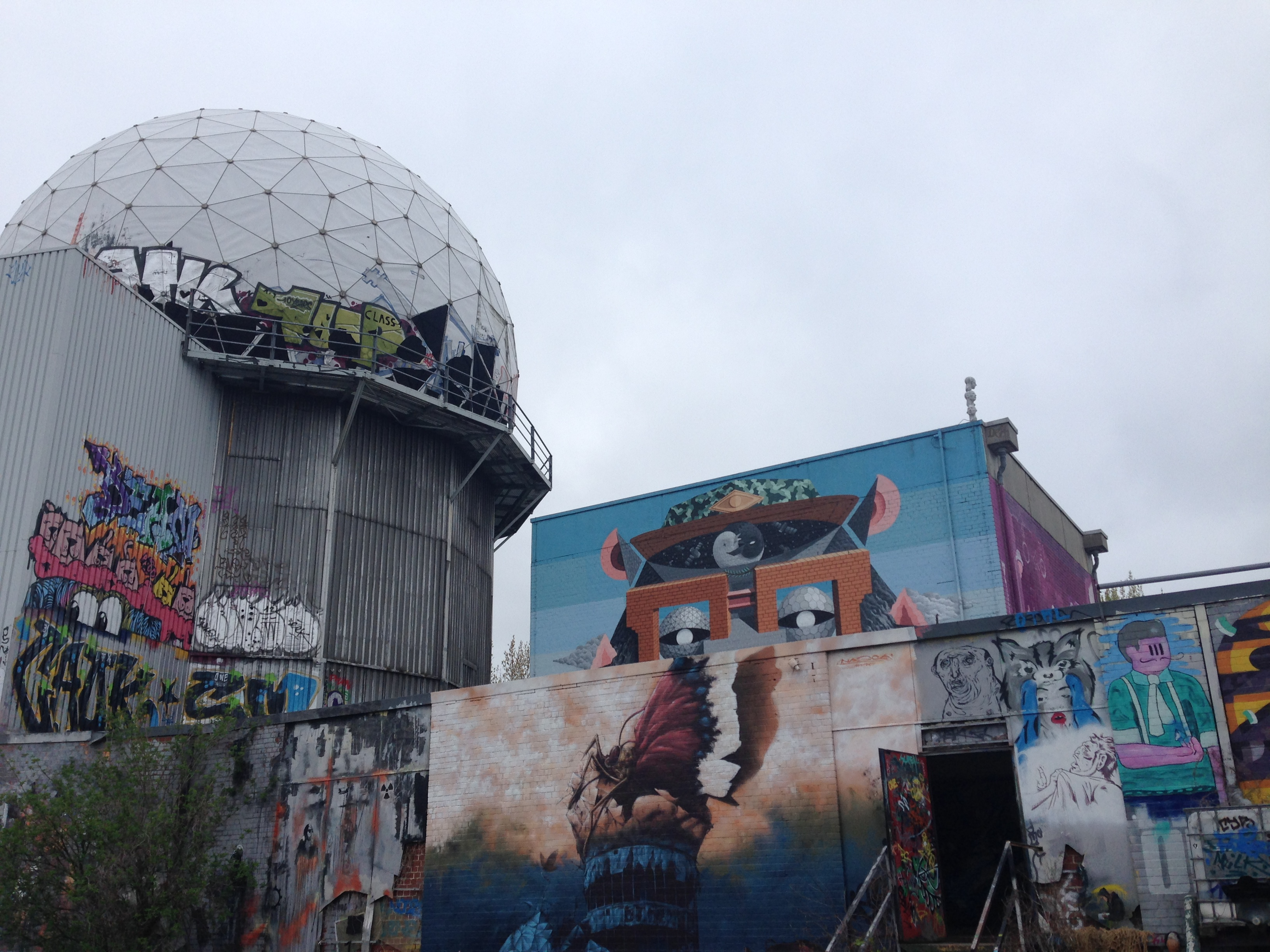
The abandoned buildings at Teufelsberg listening station have become a magnet for street artists.

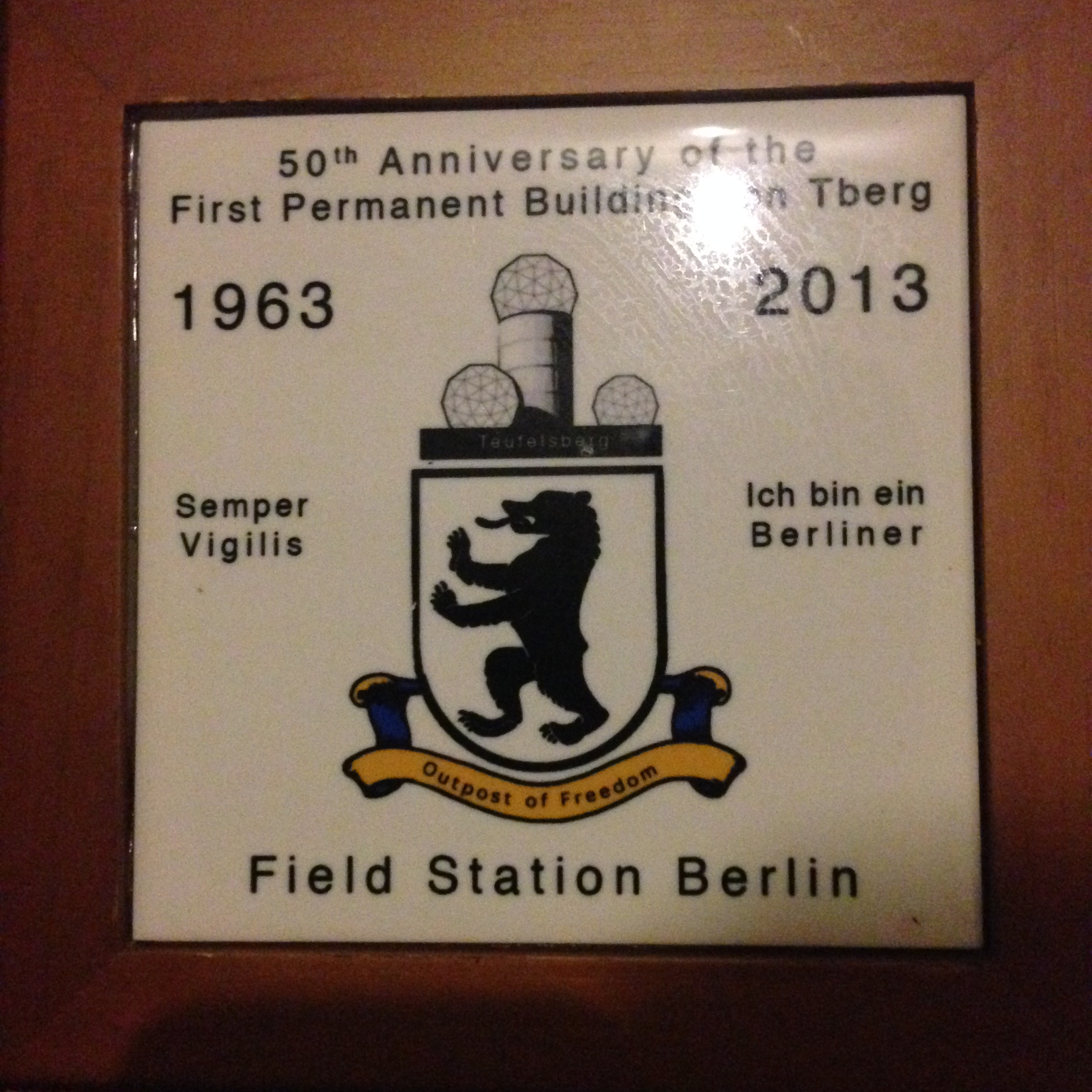
50th Anniversary of the First Permanent Building on Tberg 1963-2013

== Listening station: Field Station Berlin ==
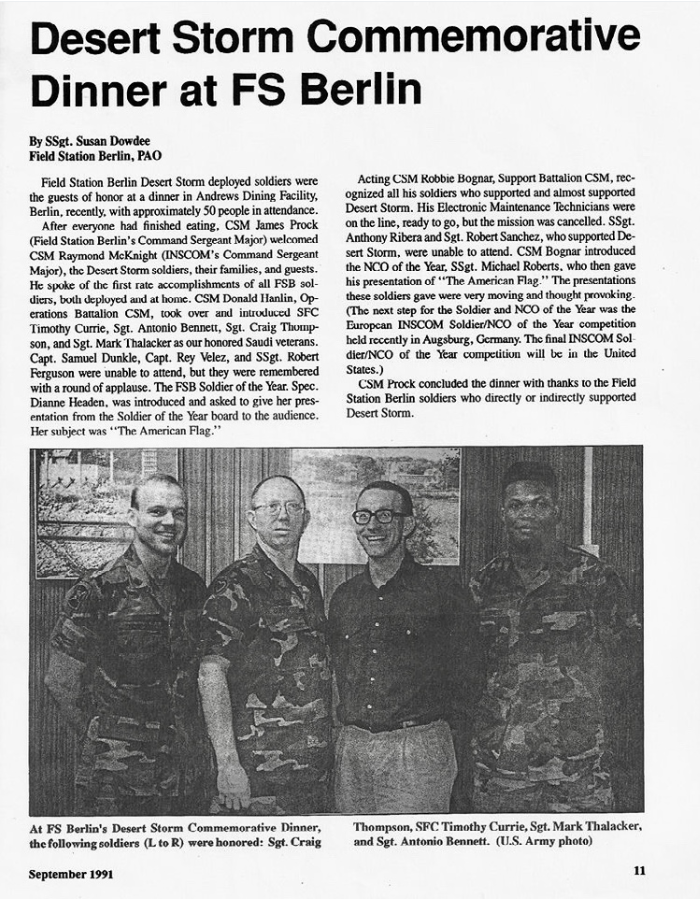
1991 dinner honoring Field Station Berlin soldiers. Sgt. Antonio Bennett 3rd

The US National Security Agency (NSA) built one of its largest listening stations atop the hill in 1963, supposedly as part of the global ECHELON intelligence gathering network. "The Hill", as it was known colloquially by the many American soldiers who worked there around the clock and who commuted there from their quarters in the American Sector, was located in the British Sector. In July 1961, mobile Allied listening units began operations on Teufelsberg, having surveyed various other locales throughout West Berlin in a search for the best vantage point for listening to Soviet, East German, and other Warsaw Pact nations’ military traffic. They found that operations from atop Teufelsberg offered a marked improvement in listening ability. This discovery eventually led to a large structure being built atop the hill, which would come to be run by the NSA (National Security Agency). Construction of a permanent facility was begun in October 1963. At the request of the US government, the ski lifts were removed because they allegedly disturbed the signals. The station continued to operate until the fall of East Germany and the Berlin Wall, but after that the station was closed and the equipment removed. The buildings and antenna radomes still remain in place.

During the NSA operations some other curious things happened: It was noticed that during certain seasons the reception of radio signals was better than during the rest of the year. The culprit was found after a while: it was the Ferris wheel of the annual German-American Volksfest Festival on the Hüttenweg in Zehlendorf. From then on, the Ferris wheel was left standing for some time after the festival was over.

While there were rumors that the Americans had excavated a shaft down into the ruins beneath, that was never proven, and was likely based on reports that those who maintained equipment in one of the first enclosed antenna structures accessed the upper levels of the inflated dome via an airlock that led to a "tunnel" that was embedded in the structure's central column. Speculation as to what might have existed within the highly restricted area frequently gave rise to rather elaborate but false rumors; one theory stated that "the tunnel" was an underground escape route, another that it housed a submarine base.

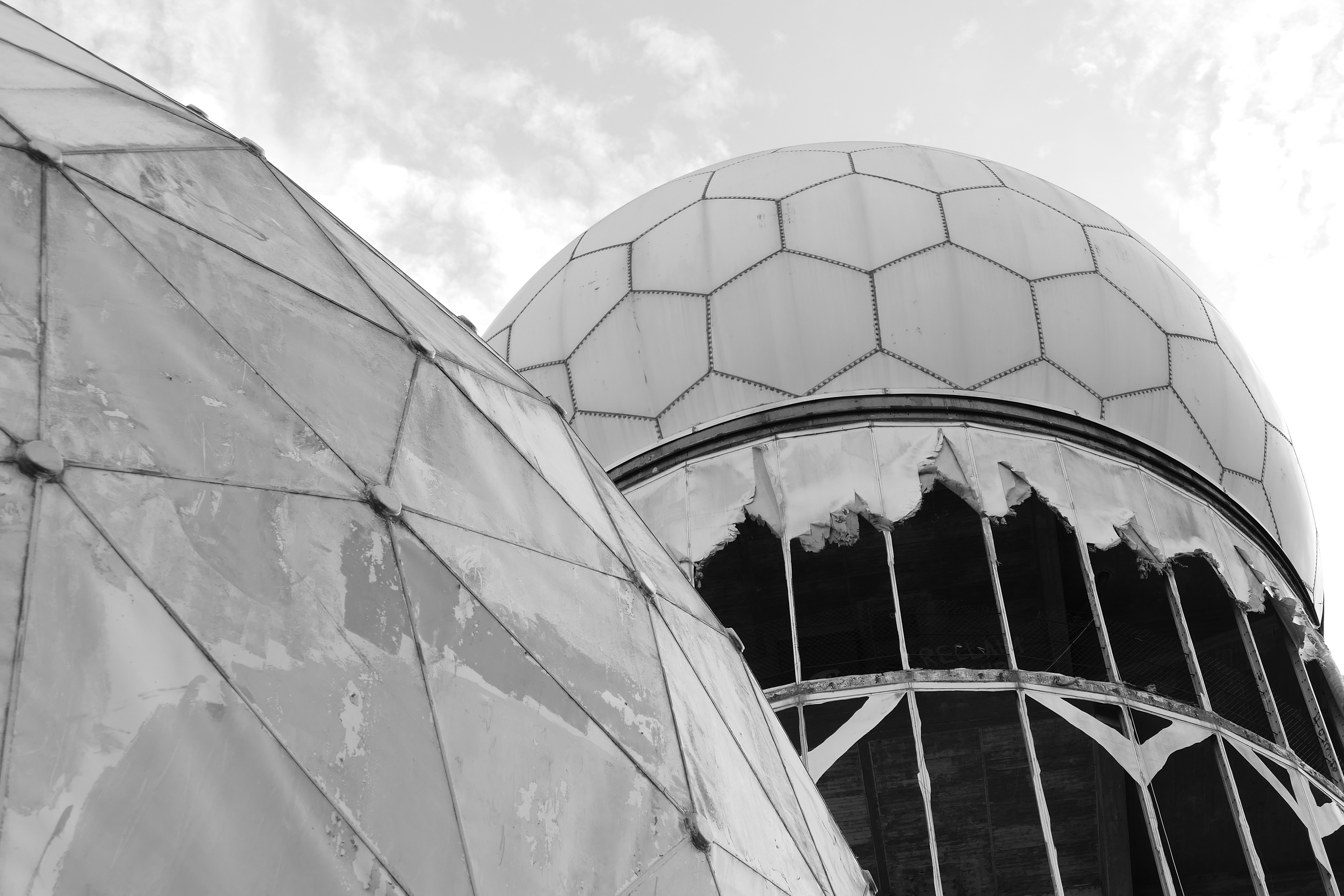
Decayed outer skins of two radomes, 2022

In the 1990s, as Berlin experienced an economic boom after German reunification, a group of investors bought the former listening station area from the City of Berlin with the intention to build hotels and apartments. There was talk of preserving the listening station as a spy museum. Berlin's building boom produced a glut of buildings, however, and the Teufelsberg project became unprofitable. The construction project was then aborted. As of the early 2000s, there has been talk of the city buying back the hill. However, this is unlikely, as the area is encumbered with a mortgage of nearly 50 million dollars. The site has been heavily covered in graffiti since the company abandoned the project. Since 1996, the site has been privately owned and is currently fenced off from the surrounding forest. In the summer of 2016, landlord Marvin Schutte opened the site to visitors who are able to climb the listening station towers and admire the ever-evolving "street art gallery" that fills the site's abandoned buildings. The site and buildings have uneven surfaces, broken glass, and building debris. Accessing the main dome involves ascending a pitch dark stairwell in the centre of the building. As of April 2017, entry to the site is €8 payable at the main entrance gate and a sign informs visitors that it is open from 10am to "one hour before sunset."

Following the announcement of plans to raze the facility and reforest the hill, talk of preserving the facility resurfaced in 2009, spearheaded by the Field Station Berlin Veterans Group, which hopes to have the memorial named in honor of Major Arthur D. Nicholson, the last military Cold War casualty, a U.S. Military Liaison Mission tour officer who was shot and killed by a Russian sentry near Ludwigslust on March 24, 1985. After no further construction was done after 2004, in 2006 the hilltop was categorised as forest in the land use plan of Berlin, thereby eliminating the possibility of building.

In September 2013, U.S. Army Teufelsberg veterans marked the fiftieth anniversary (1963–2013) of the construction of the permanent buildings for Field Station Berlin atop Teufelsberg with a special commemorative issue of Cinderella stamps, and with the dedication of a commemorative plaque. The designer is T. H. E. Hill, the award-winning author of two novels about Field Station Berlin.

== Gallery ==
Graffiti on the walls

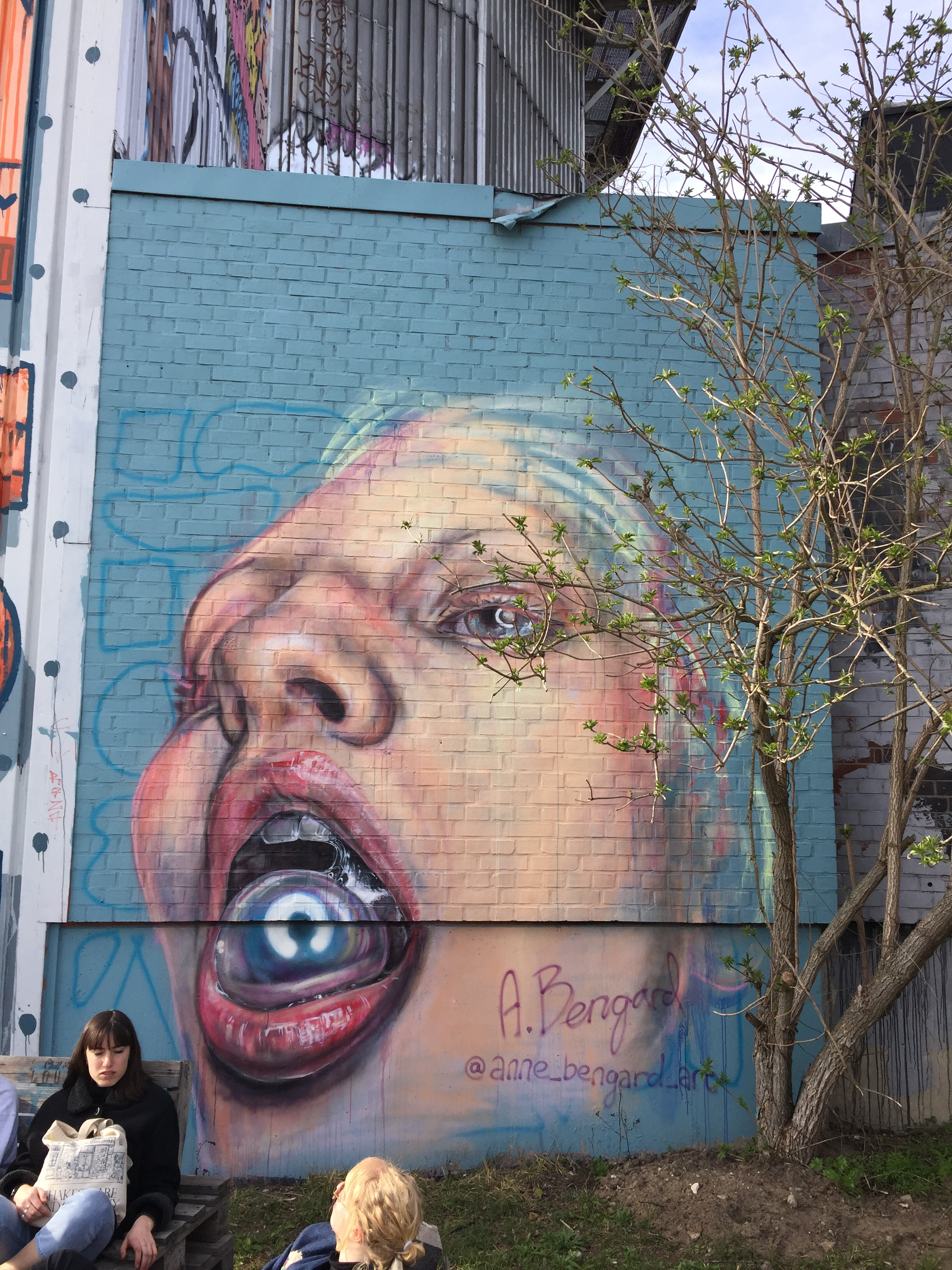

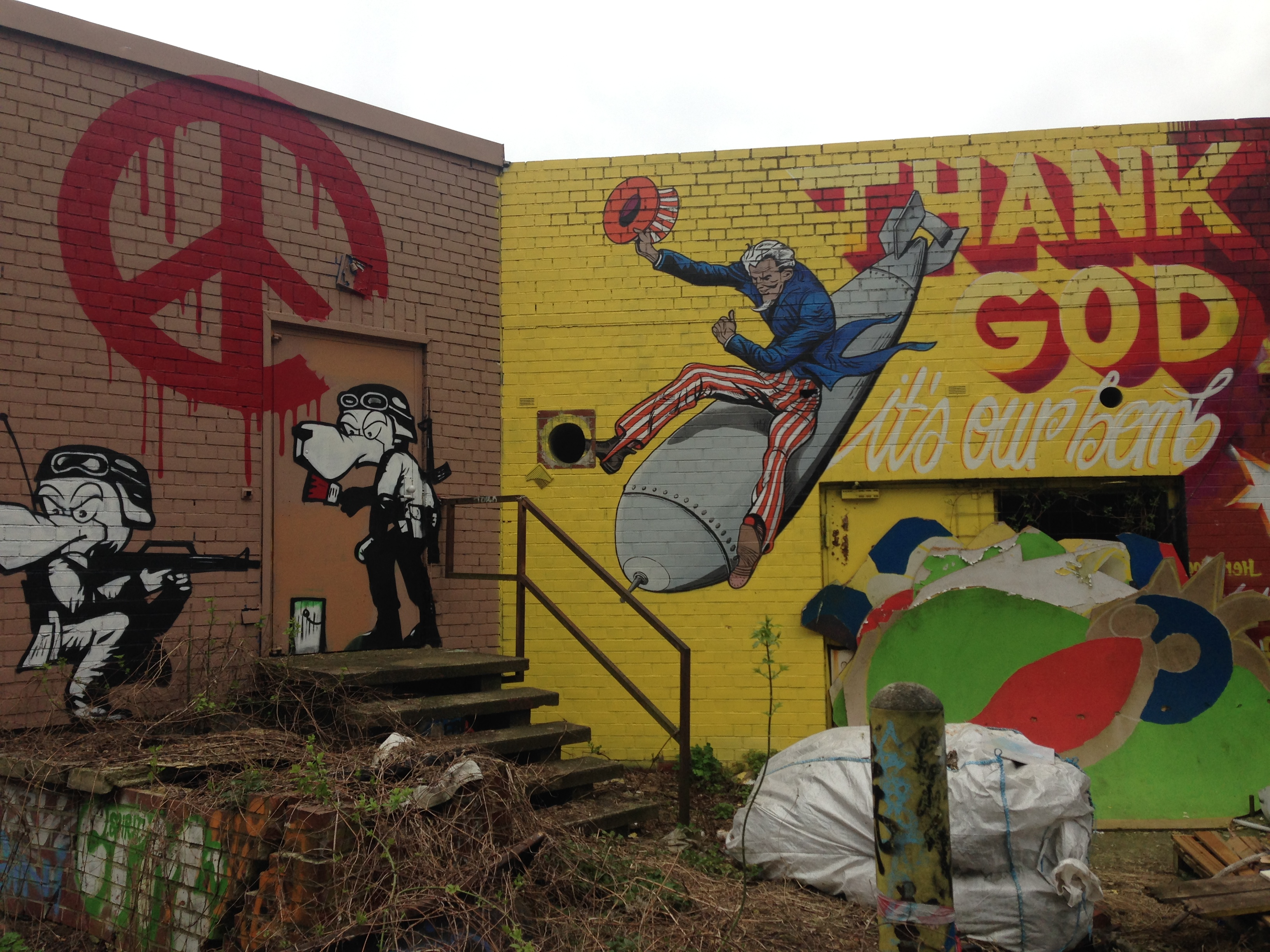

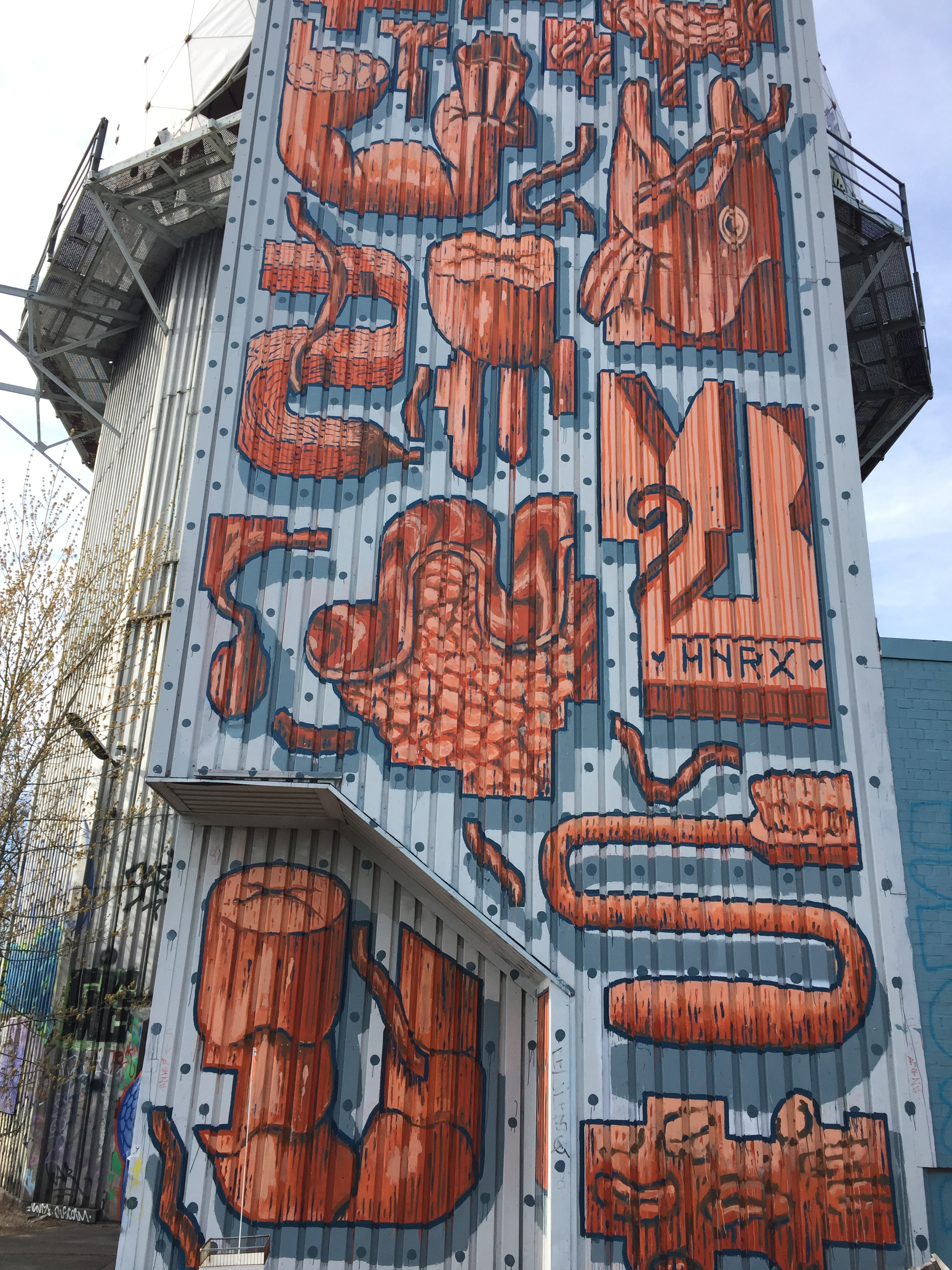

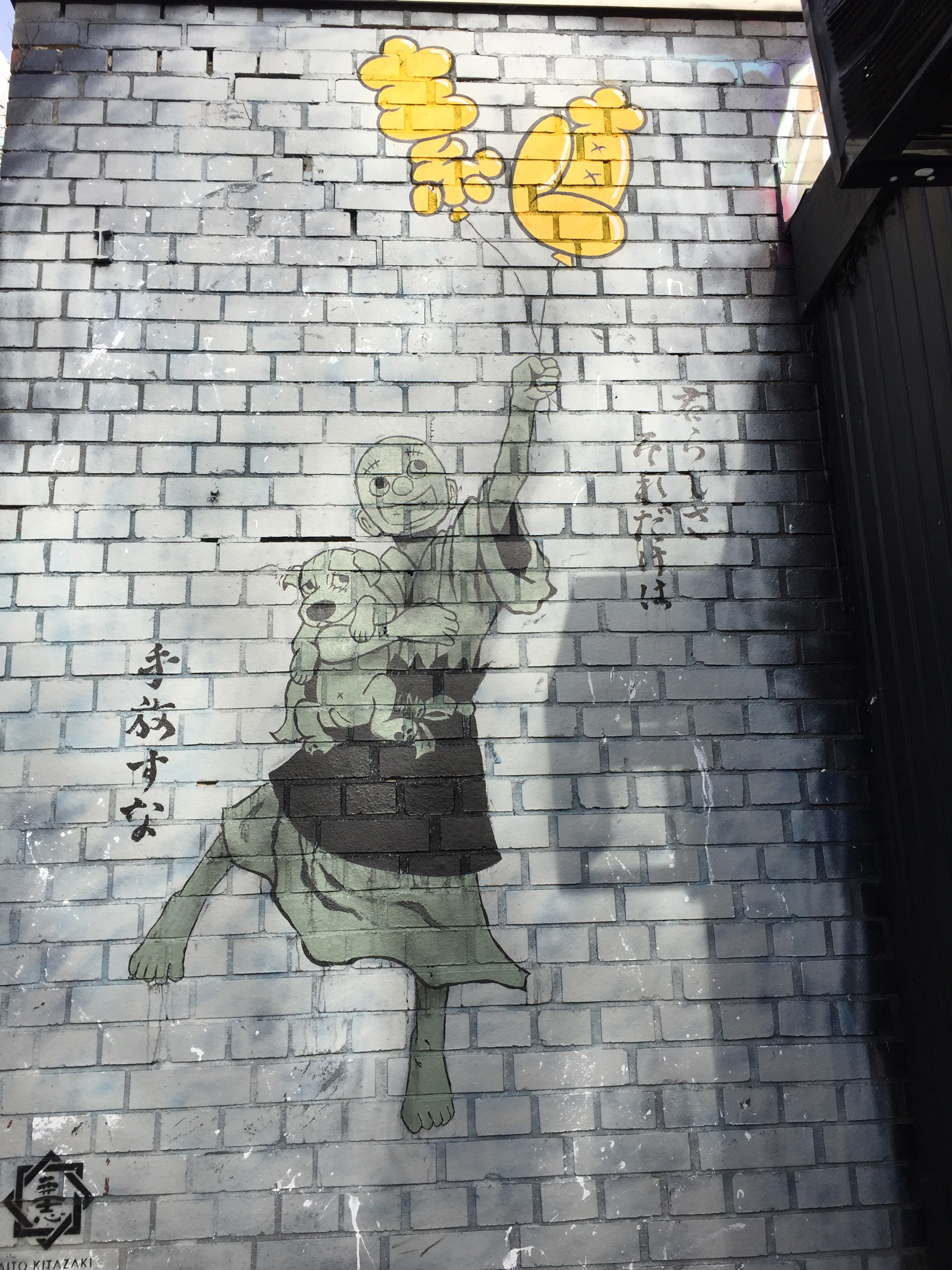

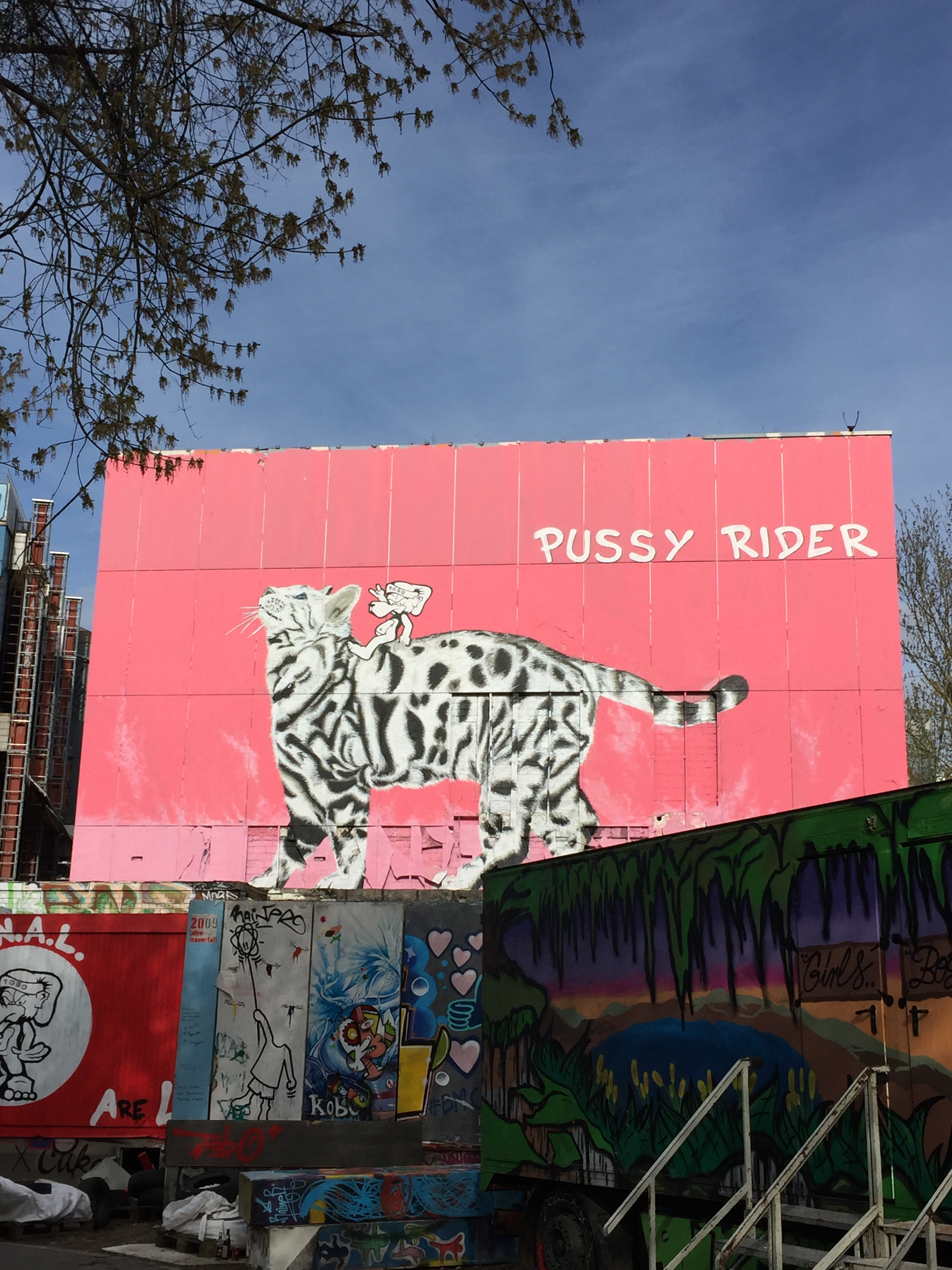

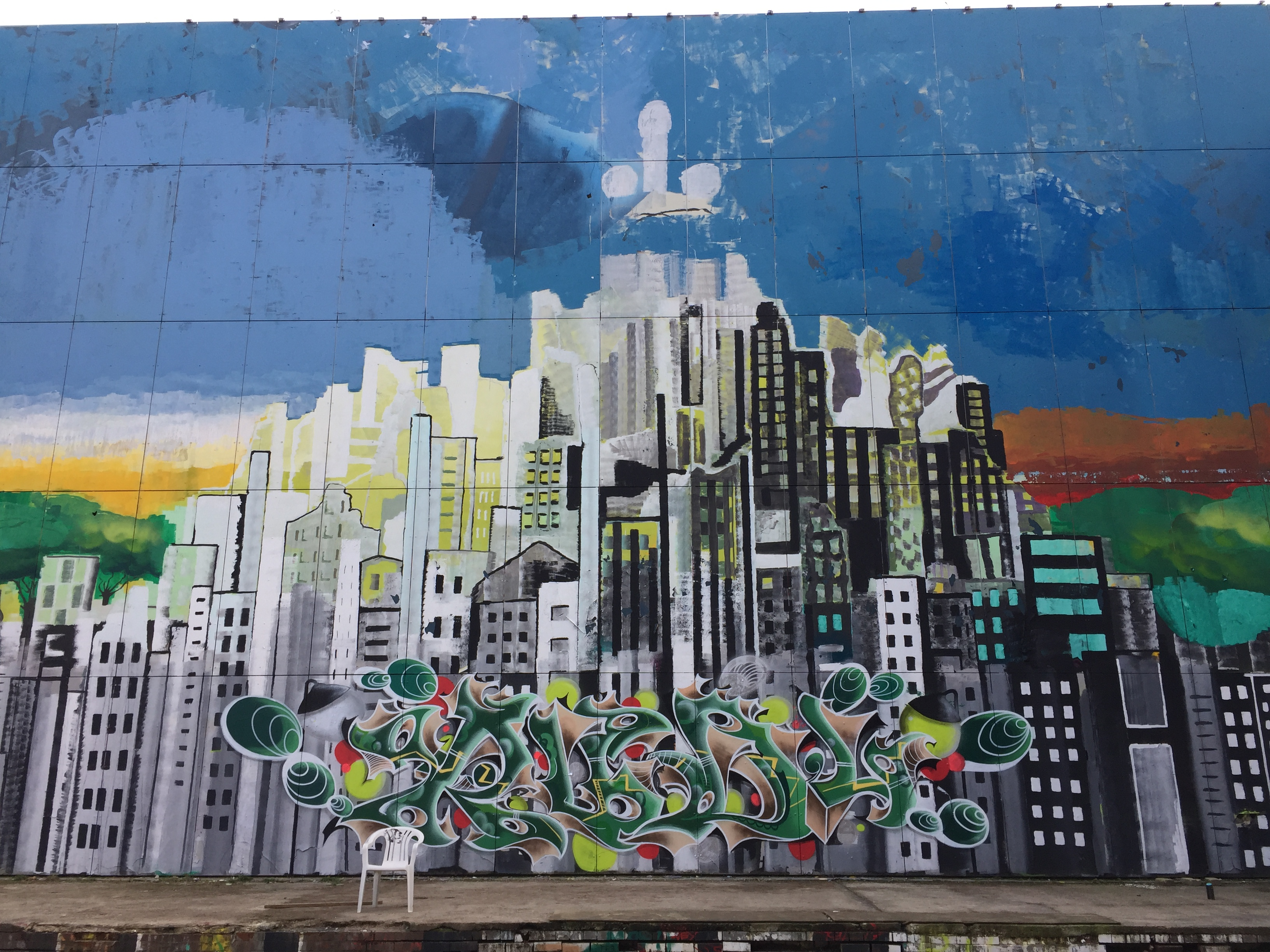

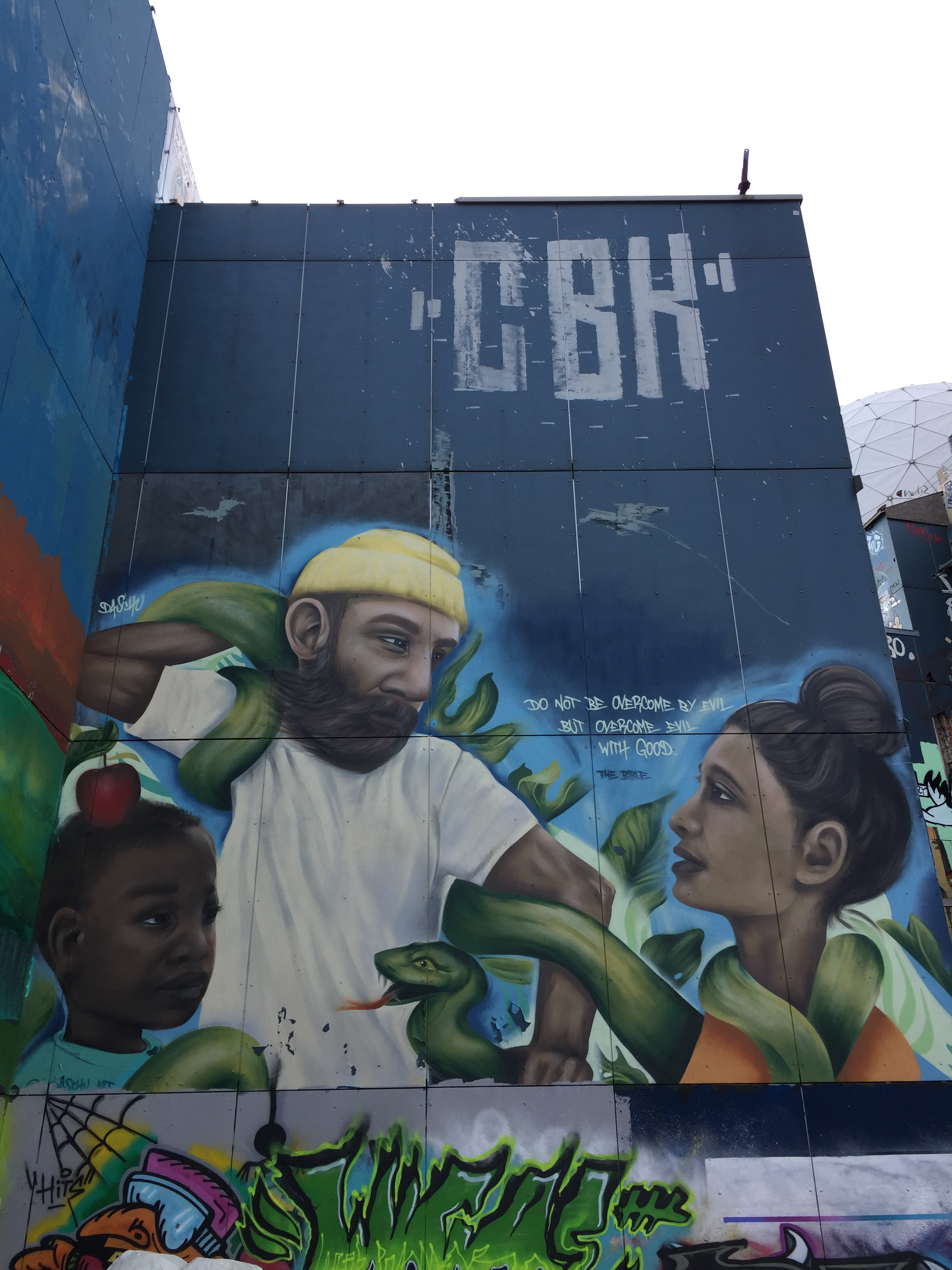

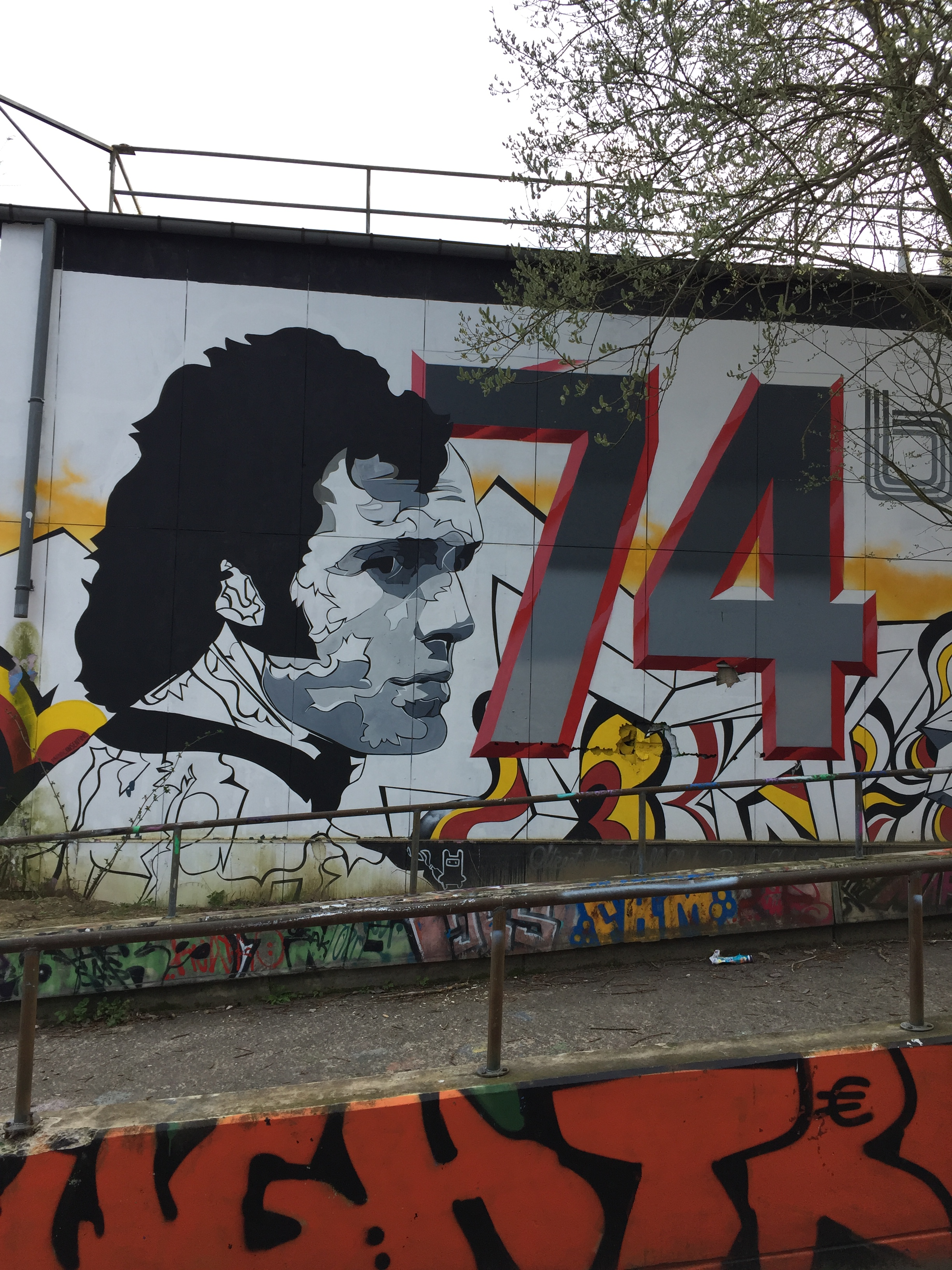

== In popular culture ==
Art

- Hito Steyerl's "Factory of the Sun" and "The Identity Factory" both feature the location as an integral part of the respective works.

Memoirs

- C Trick: Sort of a Memoir, a memoir by Don Cooper (2000). Republished and expanded in 2003 in soft-cover as Worth the Trip. Re-republished as C Trick in 2010 with a prologue, new epilogue, and four new chapters. An ASA German linguist at Field Station Berlin in the mid-1960s.
- From Pin Stripes to Army Stripes by Sergeant Michael Riles, a memoir of experiences in occupied Germany from 1977 to 1981.
- The United States Garrison Berlin 1945-1994 by William Durie, 2014. ISBN 978-1-63068-540-9.
- Berlin Daze - Tales of The Cold War on the Island of Freedom by C. Eric Estberg, 2018. ISBN 978-1726471299.

Novels

By insiders

- Death On Devil's Mountain by David Von Norden (2009). ASA on Teufelsberg at Field Station Berlin in the late 1960s.
- McCurry's War by Chuck Thompson (2012): Field Station Berlin atop Teufelsberg in the 1960s. A closer look at the escapades of the soldiers of Teufelsberg with a little bit of humor mixed in that only the Army could provide.
- Voices Under Berlin: The Tale of a Monterey Mary by T.H.E. Hill (2008): An ASA Russian linguist in Berlin ostensibly in the mid-1950s, but closer in reality to the Field Station in the mid-1970s.
- Reunification: A Monterey Mary Returns to Berlin by T.H.E. Hill (2013): A comparison of Berlin in the 1970s with Berlin in the 2010s, spiced up with the stories of escapades that only ASA-ers at the Field Station could have pulled off.

By outsiders

- The Wall by John Marks (1999): an officer at the Field Station defects to the East just hours before the Wall falls; an outsider's view of Field Station Berlin.
- The Predicament by William Boyd (2025): set in June 1963, the protagonist follows a suspected would be assassin to the Teufelsberg.

Audio

- Devil's Mountain by the Walrus & Bear podcast
- Cold War Linguists: The NSA's Spies of Teufelsberg (interviews with former workers)

Video

- Inside Field Station Berlin Teufelsberg [31c3] by Bill Scannell on YouTube

Music videos

- In 2010 Dutch band Ilanois recorded the music video for their single "Chase the Sundown with Me" at the roof of the station.
- "Lost Faith" by Bob Mould, a music video in which the listening station is featured as a backdrop.
- "A Million Stars" by the Australian band The Faim was recorded in the station in 2018.

Television

- The Same Sky, a 2017 series set in 1974, where several characters work at the listening station
- Berlin Station, a 2016 series set in the modern-day CIA Berlin Station

Film

- Manifesto, a 2015 multi-screen film installation by Julian Rosefeldt, features a scene at the station, involving a homeless man reciting various Situationist manifestos.

Video Games

- Call of Duty: Black Ops Cold War, a 2020 first-person shooter video game, features Teufelsberg, and the listening station, as the multiplayer map Echelon.

== See also ==
- Teuflesberg (horse), American thoroughbred racehorse named after the Berlin landmark
