= Berlin-Grunewald station =

Railway station in Berlin, Germany

Coordinates: 52°29′21″N 13°15′41″E

Berlin-Grunewald
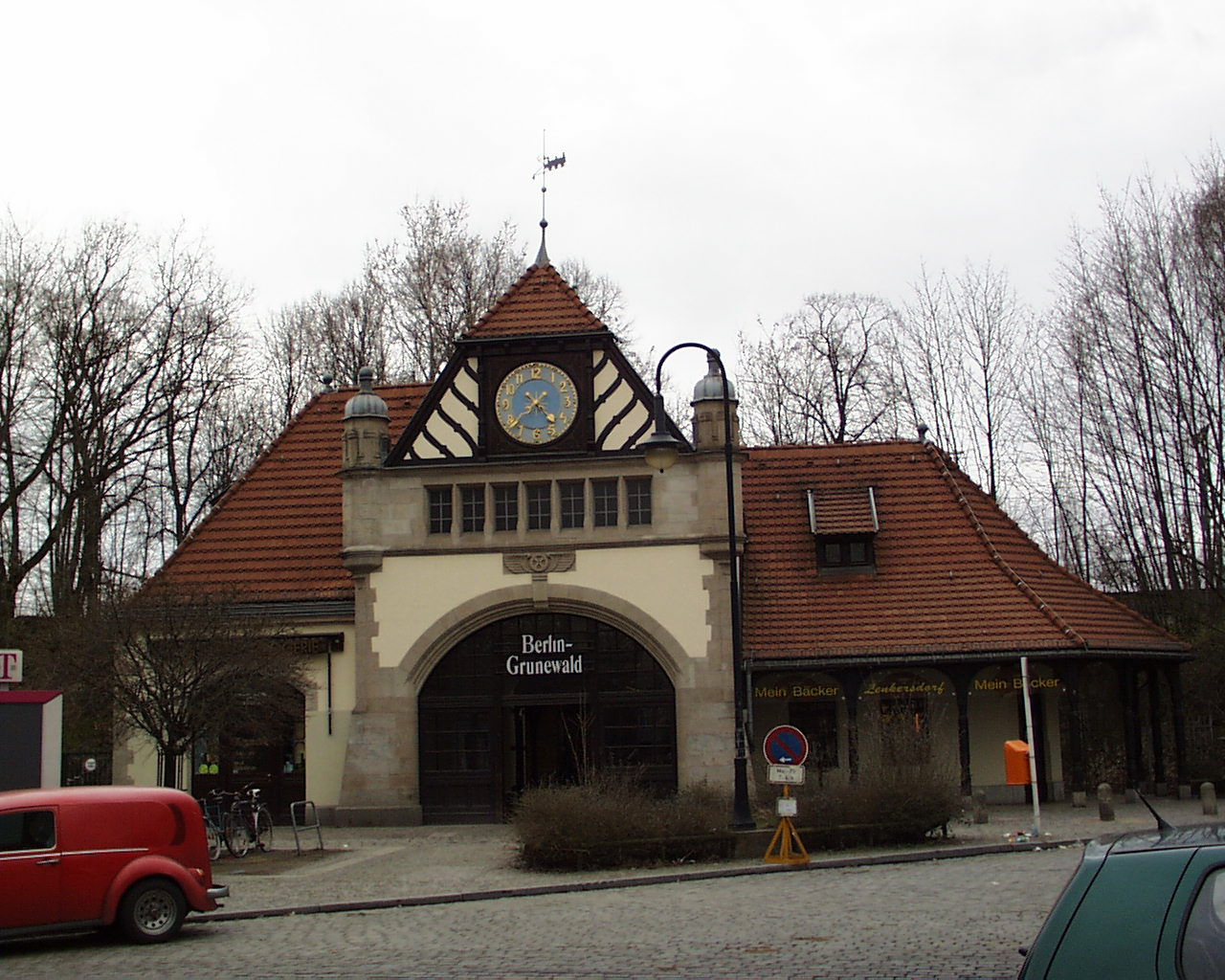

General information
- Location: Charlottenburg-Wilmersdorf, Berlin, Berlin; Germany
- Line: Berlin-Blankenheim

Other information
- Station code: 0541
- DS100 code: BGD
- Category: 4
- Fare zone: : Berlin B/5656

Services
Preceding station	Berlin S-Bahn	Following station
Nikolassee towards Potsdam Hbf	S7	Westkreuz towards Ahrensfelde
Location

Berlin-Grunewald is a railway station in the Grunewald district of Berlin. It is served by the S-Bahn line S7.

In the Second World War, the station was the principal location for deporting Berlin Jews to the East during The Holocaust.

== History ==
The station opened on 1 August 1879 on the Wetzlarer Bahn from Berlin to Blankenheim and Wetzlar, the southwestern continuation of the Stadtbahn. It was originally named Hundekehle after a nearby lake and received its current name on 15 October 1884, when the former Grunewald station reopened under the name of Halensee. The entrance hall modelled on a castle gate was finished in 1899. Berlin-Grunewald was connected to the S-Bahn network on 11 June 1928.

== Platform 17 ==
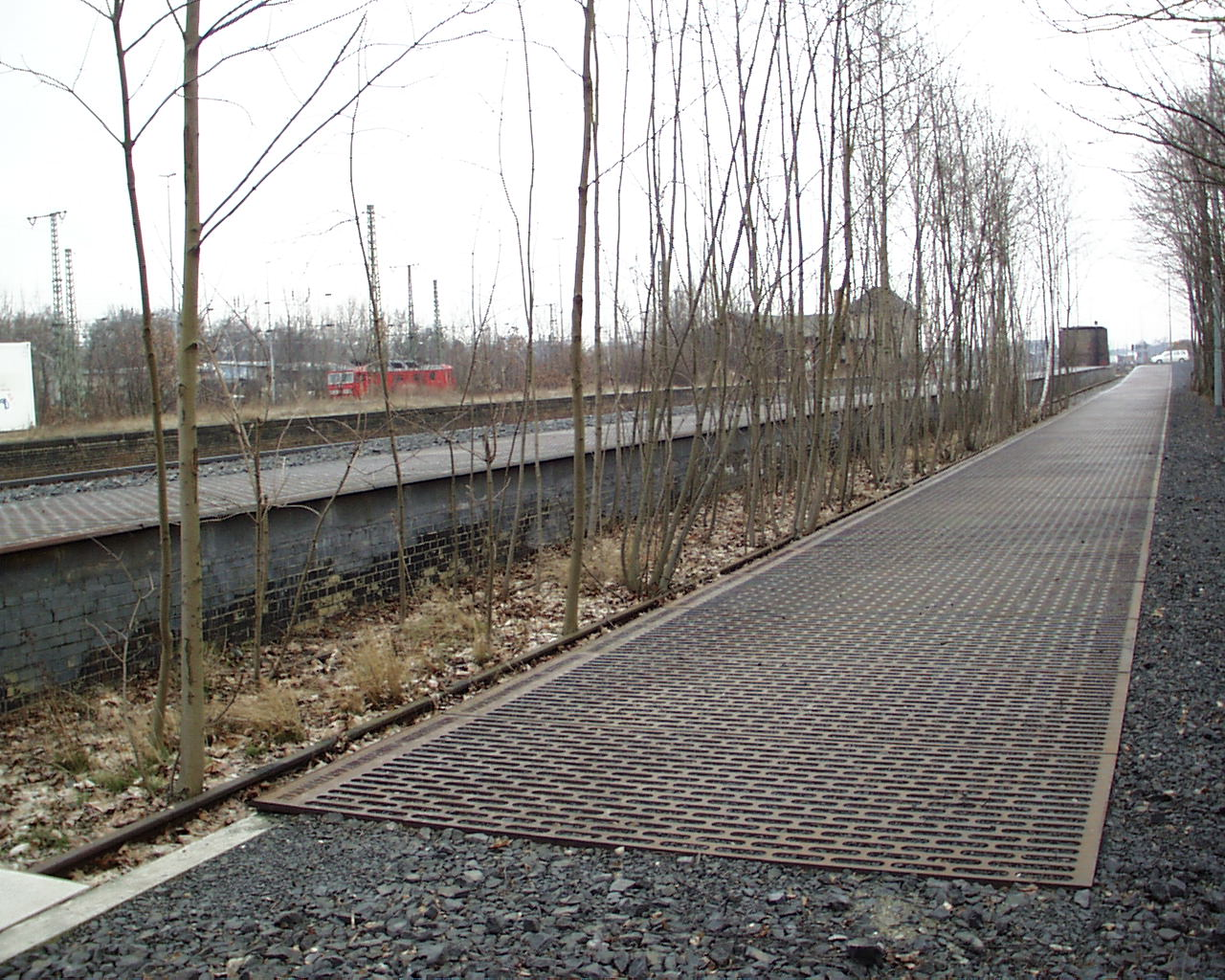
Gleis 17 memorial

Starting on 18 October 1941 until February 1945, the adjacent goods station was one of the major sites of deportation of Jews from Berlin. The trains left for ghettos in Eastern Europe such as Litzmannstadt and Warsaw. In 1942 trains left directly for Auschwitz and Theresienstadt concentration camps. A total of 35 trains transporting 17,000 Jews departed from Platform 17 (German: Gleis 17) directly to Auschwitz. By the end of the war more than 50,000 Jews had been deported through this station.

=== Memorial ===
On 18 October 1991 a monument was inaugurated at the ramp leading to the former freight yard. The memorial includes silhouettes etched into a concrete wall, designed by Polish artist Karol Broniatowski.

On 27 January 1998, Deutsche Bahn established a memorial entitled "Gleis 17" (Platform 17). The installation records the dates of the transports, the number of people they carried and their destinations.

Near the station entrance there is a plaque detailing the history of the station and its role in the Holocaust.
