= Axel Ripke =

German politician (1880–1937)

Gauleiter of Gau Rhineland-North
- In office 27 March 1925 – 27 September 1925
- Preceded by: Position created
- Succeeded by: Karl Kaufmann; Joseph Goebbels; Viktor Lutze

Personal details
- Born: 28 April 1880 Mitau, Latvia, Russian Empire
- Died: 5 December 1937 (aged 57) Halensee, Nazi Germany
- Party: (Nazi Germany) Nazi Party (NSDAP)
- Other political affiliations: German Fatherland Party
- Occupation: Journalist

Military service
- Allegiance: German Empire
- Branch/service: Imperial German Army
- Years of service: 1914–1917
- Rank: Leutnant
- Battles/wars: World War I

Axel Herbert Ewald Ripke (28 April 1880 in Mitau – 5 December 1937 in Halensee) was a German journalist and politician of the German Fatherland Party and the Nazi Party (NSDAP). Among other things, he was one of the first Gauleiters of the NSDAP and an early mentor of Joseph Goebbels.

== Early life ==
After leaving school Ripke studied history and philology at university. During that time the theories of his teacher Heinrich Rickert exerted a dominating influence on him. After completing his studies he worked as a journalist.

Before World War I Ripke held close ties to the imperialist and nationalist Pan-German League. In 1912 he became a more widely known figure when he took over the position of publisher of the newly founded national-liberal periodical Der Panther (The Panther), which was distinguishing itself for its viciously imperialist positions: Even the name of the new organ was an invocation of one of the most notorious gestures of aggression in the area of foreign politics made by the German Government in the years preceding World War I, namely the so-called Panthersprung nach Agadir (Panther's leap to Agadir), which referred to the demonstrative deployment of the German gunboat Panther to the Moroccan city of Agadir during the Agadir Crisis of 1911, which was generally interpreted (and intended to be) as a statement of willingness on the part of the Imperial German Government to resort to force, to assert its goals. An aspect of particular significance pertaining to the tendency of Der Panther was the belligerent Anglophobia it was propagating:

The saying that 'the world is rapidly becoming English' has so far proved true; and it is up to the Germans alone to put a stop to this prophecy.

== World War I and immediate post-war period ==
After the outbreak of World War I Ripke had his newspaper, in accordance with their positions in foregone years, immediately joined the chorus of enthusiastically pro-war voices among the German press. Der Panther was vastly more annexationist than most other publications. After Ripke himself was drafted into the Prussian army in the Winter of 1914/1915 as a Leutnant of the reserve, he handed the control of his newspaper over to his wife. During the ensuing two years of the war Ripke worked in the Army Press Office and in German military administration.

In 1917 Ripke joined the German Fatherland Party (DVP) a far-right party, which represented the most right-wing and pro-war elements in the political spectrum of Imperial Germany during the last years of World War I. In November 1917 Ripke was discharged from the Prussian Army in order to become chief of the press department of the DVP. In this capacity he published a plethora of brochures and books that were intended to flare up the waning war morale. Among those publications was the anthology Zehn deutsche Rede (Ten German speeches) which Ripke edited, while his future colleague among the higher echelons of the NSDAP Ernst Graf zu Reventlow was among the contributors.

After the end of World War I and the collapse of Imperial Germany, Ripke served as Secretary General of the new DVP, a moderate right-wing party which was propped up in 1918 and 1919, for a brief period of time. He was swiftly dismissed from that position on account of his inept handling of the party's finances - creating a debt of 40,000 Reichsmarks.

In the following years Ripke worked as executive director of the Hansa Association's branch in the city of Elberfeld and as contributor of the right-wing newspaper Bürgervorwärts (Ahead!, Bourgeoisie), whose name was an allusion to the social-democrat newspaper Vorwärts, whose right-wing/bourgeois counterpart the Bürgervorwärts was supposed to be. In the early 1920s Ripke started to move closer and closer to the völkisch movement among the German right.

== Nazi Party career ==
Ripke became one of the first members of the Nazi Party (NSDAP) after its re-foundation in February 1925. Adolf Hitler appointed Ripke as the first Gauleiter of the Gau Rheinland-Nord (Northern Rhineland) on 27 March 1925. Ripke established his Gau headquarters in the city of Elberfeld. Among his staff members were Karl Kaufmann, Hellmuth Elbrechter and Joseph Goebbels. After a short period of time, Ripke's more radical aides grew at odds with their chief whom they considered to be inadequately activist. After bemoaning his lack of revolutionary spirit for a couple of weeks the trio of Goebbels, Elbrechter and Kaufmann set out to stage a coup against Ripke. In June 1925 Goebbels published an essay entitled Verkalkte Intelligenz (Calcified Intelligence) which represented a frontal attack against Ripke, who was clear to everyone to be the target of Goebbels polemics, even though his name was not mentioned. Goebbels' diaries from that time also included a number of sharp criticisms of Ripke:

He hates my radicalism as if it was the plague. Alas he is a bourgeois man in disguise. That kind is unusable if one wants to make a revolution.

In their aspiration to overthrow Ripke, the clique of Goebbels, Kaufmann and Elbrechter initiated an intrigue against him. By accusing him of embezzling party funds they sought to make him unacceptable as Gauleiter for the leadership of the NSDAP in Munich. Following the charges brought forward by Ripke's subordinates, the party leadership started an investigation of his handling of his Gau's funds in July 1925. Exhausted by the continuous barrage of attacks against him by his staff, on 7 July Ripke took a leave of absence from his post. In August, a Party investigative committee convened under the leadership of Gregor Strasser. As a result, Ripke was dismissed from his Gauleiter position on 27 September 1925. He was succeeded by a triumvirate consisting of Kaufmann, Goebbels, and Viktor Lutze. Goebbels, despite his machinations against Ripke, conceded in his diary that the latter had taught him "infinitely much" as a propagandist and that Ripke had been "an event in my life".

After 1925 Ripke mostly retreated from public life. For a period of time he worked as editor for the nationalist Bergisch-Märkische Zeitung. In 1929 he was elected a member of the municipal council of the city of Wuppertal for the NSDAP. His hope to be put on the list of Nazi candidates for the Reichstag election of 1930 was thwarted by Goebbels who had him ruled out from the list of suggested candidates.

In 1929 Ripke managed to gain a post as a Municipal Policy Specialist in Gau Düsseldorf. There he experienced ongoing conflicts with the Gauleiter, Friedrich Karl Florian. In February 1932, he was appointed by Alfred Rosenberg as Regional Leader in the Rhineland and Westphalia for the Fighting League for German Culture. However, by April, Florian managed to have the appointment revoked. Following additional conflicts with Florian, Ripke was declared mentally ill by a court-appointed physician. It was rumored that this resulted from syphilis contracted in his youth. A number of character flaws were alleged against Ripke, and Florian sought his dismissal as he was deemed "a political liability." A review by the Obersten Parteigericht (Supreme Party Court) under Walter Buch on 9 November 1932 determined that he should be expelled from the Party for "conduct damaging to the Party."

After being re-admitted to the NSDAP for a very brief time in May 1934, Ripke was once again excluded at the insistence of Florian by a decision of the Gau Düsseldorf Party tribunal on 9 May 1934. Ripke, however, did re-enter politics when he was re-elected to the municipal council of Wuppertal. He died on 5 December 1937.

== Publications ==
- Neue Weltkultur, 1915.
- Zehn deutsche Reden, 1915. (editor)
- Wie ehrt ein Volk seine großen Männer?, 1915.
- Der Koloss auf tönernen Füssen, 1916.

== Sources ==
- Fritz Fischer: War of Illusions. German policies from 1911 to 1914, 1975.
- Höffkes, Karl (1986). Hitlers Politische Generale. Die Gauleiter des Dritten Reiches: ein biographisches Nachschlagewerk. Tübingen: Grabert-Verlag. ISBN 3-87847-163-7.
- Longerich, Peter (2015). Goebbels: A Biography. New York: Random House. ISBN 978-1400067510.
- Miller, Michael D.; Schulz, Andreas (2017). Gauleiter: The Regional Leaders of the Nazi Party and Their Deputies, 1925-1945. Vol. II (Georg Joel - Dr. Bernhard Rust). R. James Bender Publishing. ISBN 978-1-932970-32-6.
- Matthew Stibbe: German Anglophobia and the Great War, 1914-1918, 2006.
