= Verein für Hamburgische Geschichte =

German historical society

The Verein für Hamburgische Geschichte (VHG) is a historical society founded on 9 April 1839, which is open to both professional historians and historically interested laypersons. The society's office and library are located in the Staatsarchiv der Freien und Hansestadt Hamburg.

== History ==
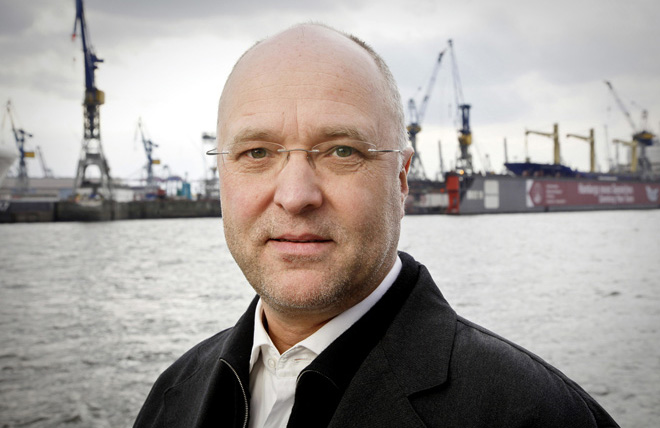
Rainer Nicolaysen is the current chairman of the Association for Hamburg History

The VHG was founded on 9 April 1839 by Hamburg citizens on the initiative of the Patriotic Society of 1765. The first chairman of the society, which 62 people joined on the day of its foundation, was until 1865 the historian and Senate archivist Johann Martin Lappenberg. The number of members rose to 242 by the end of the year.

From 1937, the archival councillor and later short-term head of the Staatsarchiv der Freien und Hansestadt Hamburg Kurt Detlev Möller as the first chairman. Möller swore the association to hostility towards the Jews in a lecture. To the 18 remaining Jewish members he sent a form in which they were to confirm their "Aryan" origin. Möller came under public criticism after 1945. This occurred not because of his antisemitism, but because in a publication on the surrender of Hamburg he criticised the Reichsstatthalter and Gauleiter Karl Kaufmann, who had been in office throughout the Third Reich and was jointly responsible for all crimes in Hamburg, and the entire National Socialist leadership of Hamburg in his post-war account Das letzte Kapitel. Geschichte der Kapitulation Hamburgs with a mild account partially absolved of guilt and responsibility. This process led to the removal of Kurt Detlev Möller from his post as Head of the State Archives, which he had just taken up, by the Free Hanseatic City of Hamburg. However, the Verein für Hamburgische Geschichte stood by its chairman and kept him in his post until 1957. His Jewish members who were expelled at that time were only commemorated by the association in November 2007 during an extraordinary general meeting.

The VHG celebrated its 175th birthday on 9 April 2014 with a ceremony at Hamburg City Hall. The keynote speech was given by the New York historian Volker Berghahn, who grew up in Hamburg. From April 2014 to March 2015, a travelling exhibition entitled "Anchored in the City - 175 Years of the Verein für Hamburgische Geschichte" was shown at several public places in Hamburg.

In 2019, the association has around 1143 members, including the historians Frank Bajohr, Hans-Werner Goetz, Joist Grolle, Rainer Hering, Franklin Kopitzsch, Wolfgang Kopitzsch, Hans-Dieter Loose, Angelika Schaser and Barbara Vogel. The current chairperson is Rainer Nicolaysen. Vice-chairman is Dirk Brietzke. The Verein für Hamburgische Geschichte is one of the few German history and antiquities societies in Germany that can boast a young department.

Over time, various contributions and presentations have appeared on the history of the association itself.

The VHG is a member of the Gesamtverein der Deutschen Geschichts- und Altertumsvereine. Since 1864, the association has awarded the Lappenberg Medal.

== Working groups and association activities ==
Library Committee The library of the VHG comprises about 13,000 volumes (as of 2020) on the history of Hamburg, its districts and neighbouring regions as well as the Hanseatic League. The Library Committee has the task of administering the library, taking in new books, cataloguing and signing them, arranging the holdings, deciding on new acquisitions, accepting donations (for example from budget liquidations), repairing damaged books. There are exchange partnerships with a number of Hamburg and non-Hamburg institutions for the exchange of new publications. The numerous duplicates from donations are offered to the members of the association in a book flea market. The holdings of the association's library have not yet been entered in the union catalogue of Hamburg libraries. The books can be viewed and borrowed on site in the association's rooms at the State Archives.

Historical Excursions Committee The Committee for Historical Excursions cultivates the knowledge of Hamburg's history and its research in excursions and tours. These tours or trips are each prepared and led by two members of the committee and, depending on the topic, supplemented and supported by experts. The spectrum ranges from theme-related walks and bicycle tours, museum tours to round trips of several days through northern Germany or abroad.

Working Group "Young Association" In order to counter a foreseeable ageing and loss of members, the VHG started in 2013 to recruit members among students and pupils (among others, the membership fee is waived for members up to the age of 28). The "younger" members (about 14–40 years old) meet regularly for regulars' evenings after museum tours and lectures. Recurring events include the colloquium "From the BA thesis to the dissertation", self-organised museum visits and further training, as well as participation in pub quizzes. According to a study published in 2016, a good 200 of the 1,100 members belonged to the "young association" working group at that time.

Working Group on Remembrance From 2007 to 2017, members of the VHG met to report, discuss and write down their personal memories on various topics. During this time, the work of the working group has resulted in several books dealing with topics such as Living in Hamburg, School Days in Hamburg or "Essen und Trinken in Hamburg".

Stumbling Stone Research Group From 2013 to 2017, a group consisting mainly of association members researched the biographies of Nazi victims for whom Stolpersteine have been laid in the Grindel district of Hamburg-Rotherbaum. In cooperation with the Hamburg Stolperstein Initiative the Landeszentrale für politische Bildung Hamburg and the Institut für die Geschichte der deutschen Juden, the collected biographies and research results were published in the series Biografische Spurensuche.

== Publications ==
One of the main fields of activity of the VHG is the editing and publication of writings on the history of Hamburg.

The main publication is the annual Zeitschrift des Vereins für Hamburgische Geschichte (ZHG). Essays, research reports and reviews are published in the journal. The members' magazine Tiedenkieker - Hamburgische Geschichtsblätter, also published annually, contains smaller contributions on persons, institutions and events from Hamburg's history, as well as news from the life of the association. The predecessor of the Tiedenkieker was initially the Mitteilungen des Vereins für Hamburgische Geschichte (MHG), which was replaced in 1926 by the Hamburgische Geschichts- und Heimatblätter (HGH). Both ZHG and the Tiedenkieker and its predecessors, are searchable by full text search in the holdings of the Staats- und Universitätsbibliothek Hamburg.

In addition to the periodicals, the ZHG also publishes scientific research literature and special publications in loose succession. Since 1969, the series Beiträge zur Geschichte Hamburgs has been published with 68 volumes so far (as of 2020). The books of the Hamburgische Lebensbilder have been published in 25 volumes so far. Since 2018, both series have been managed by Wallstein Verlag in Göttingen.

== Chairpersons ==
- 1839–1865 Johann Martin Lappenberg
- 1867–1872 Wilhelm Hübbe
- 1872–1888 Johann Friedrich Voigt
- 1888–1912 Theodor Schrader
- 1912–1937 Hans Nirrnheim
- 1937–1957 Kurt Detlev Möller
- 1957–1974 Jürgen Bolland
- 1975–2005 Hans-Dieter Loose
- 2005–2007 Udo Schäfer
- 2007–2011 Joist Grolle
- seit 2011 Rainer Nicolaysen
