= Langhans =

Langhans is a German surname. Notable people with the surname include:

- Carl Gotthard Langhans (1732–1808), Prussian architect
- Carl Ferdinand Langhans (1782–1869), Prussian architect
- Magda Langhans (1903–1987), German political activist and politician
- Paul Langhans (1867–1952), German geographer and cartographer
- Rainer Langhans (born 1940), German writer and filmmaker
- Theodor Langhans (1839–1915), German pathologist
