= Electromote =

World's first vehicle run like a trolleybus

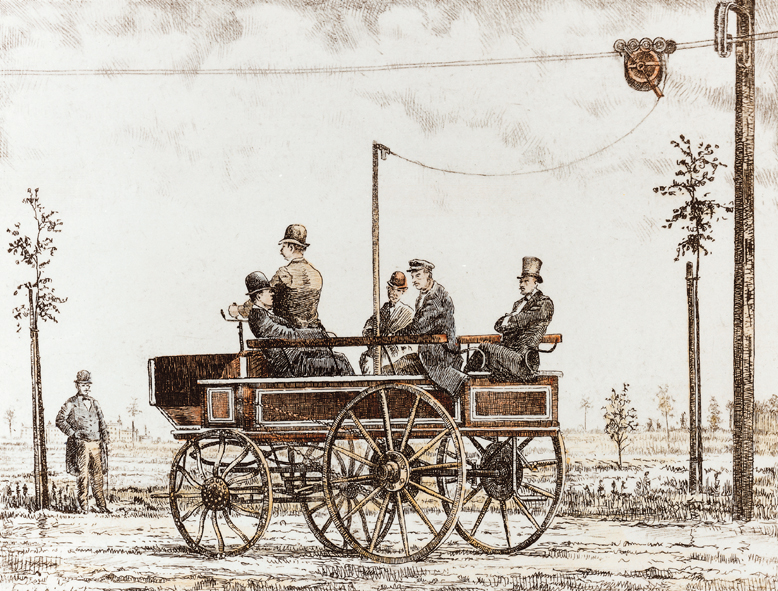
World's first trolleybus, Berlin (1882)

The Electromote was the world's first vehicle run like a trolleybus, which was first presented to the public on April 29, 1882, by its inventor Dr. Ernst Werner von Siemens in Halensee, a suburb of Berlin, Germany.

== Working on electro-magnetic propulsion ==
In 1847, Siemens told his brother Wilhelm that should he have time and money, he wanted to build himself a carriage with electro-magnetic propulsion. In the early 1880s, he managed to realize the idea, first erecting the masts and infrastructure on site in 1881. Halensee, independent and not yet part of Berlin at the time, had only been named the previous year and was not yet fully developed, providing the project with the space needed as well as access via the Berlin Ringbahn at nearby Halensee station.

== Operational history ==
The Elektromote operated from April 29 to June 13, 1882, on a 540 m (591-yard) trail-track along “Straße No. 5”, today's Joachim-Friedrich-Straße, and “Straße No. 13”, today's Johann-Georg-Straße, crossing the upper Kurfürstendamm. According to other sources, the track was along the Ku'damm itself. The track being unimproved and correspondingly bumpy led to malfunctions of the vehicle which in turn contributed to the short duration of the experiment. Public transport or demonstration was not part of the project's purpose.

This experimental vehicle already fulfilled all the technical criteria of a typical trolleybus. After the demonstration runs closed on June 13, the test track was dismantled on June 20, 1882.

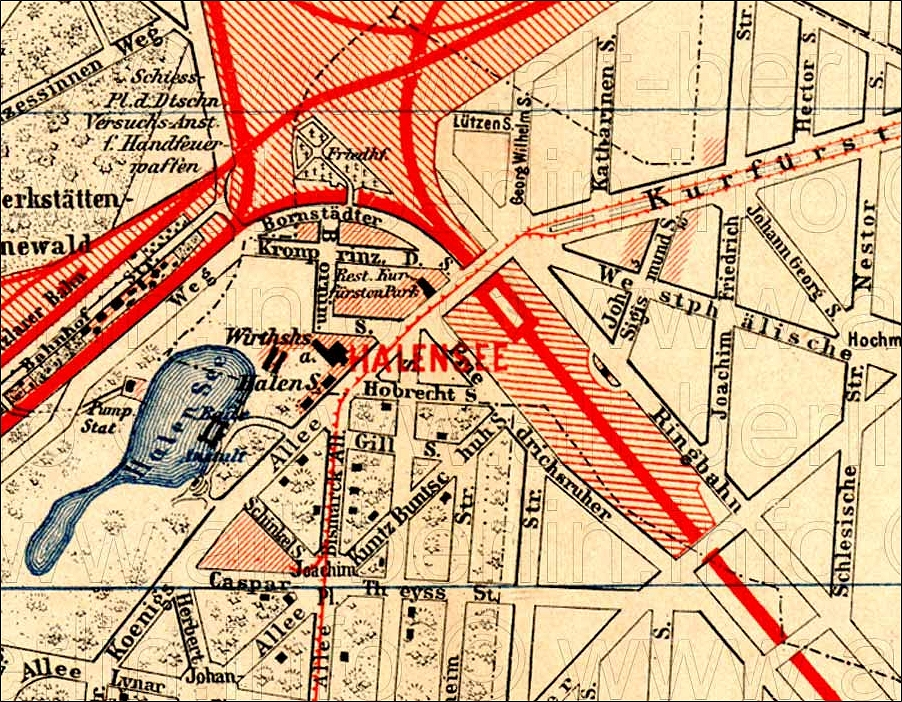
1893: The area of the experiment on a plan in 1893 (upper right corner). Eleven years later, the area still is only sparsely developed.

== Voltage and horsepower ==
The Electromote built by the Siemens & Halske company was a converted four-wheel landau carriage, equipped with two 2.2 kW electric motors, each of which transmitting power directly to one of the rear wheels using a chain drive. This was because a working differential was not available at the time. The voltage used was 550 V DC. The electric power transmission to the coach was by a flexible cable pulling a small eight-wheeled "contact car" (Kontaktwagen) that ran along the overhead power lines. The car was weighed so it wouldn't fall off the cables it ran on. In English language use, the Kontaktwagen was later named the "trolley", giving the trolley car and trolley bus their names. With the horsepower available, the conveyance reached approx. 12 km/h (7-mile-per-hour). To power the system, Carl Ludwig Frischen, chief engineer of Siemens & Halske, had a power station built in a nearby shed, consisting of a small steam engine hooked up to a dynamo.

== See also ==
- Gross-Lichterfelde Tramway
