= Johann Culemeyer =

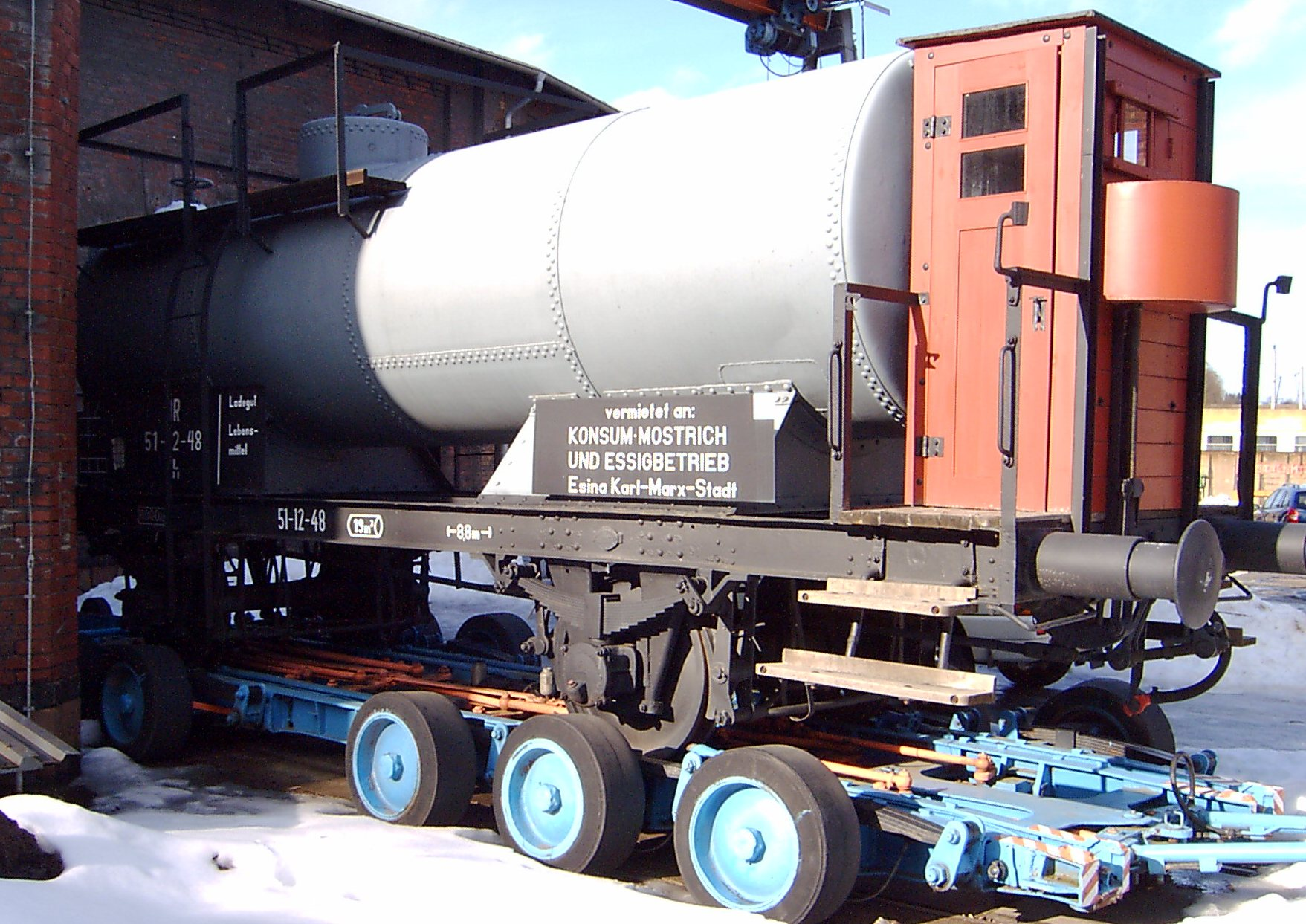
The Chemnitz Culemeyer in the Saxon Railway Museum at Chemnitz - Hilbersdorf

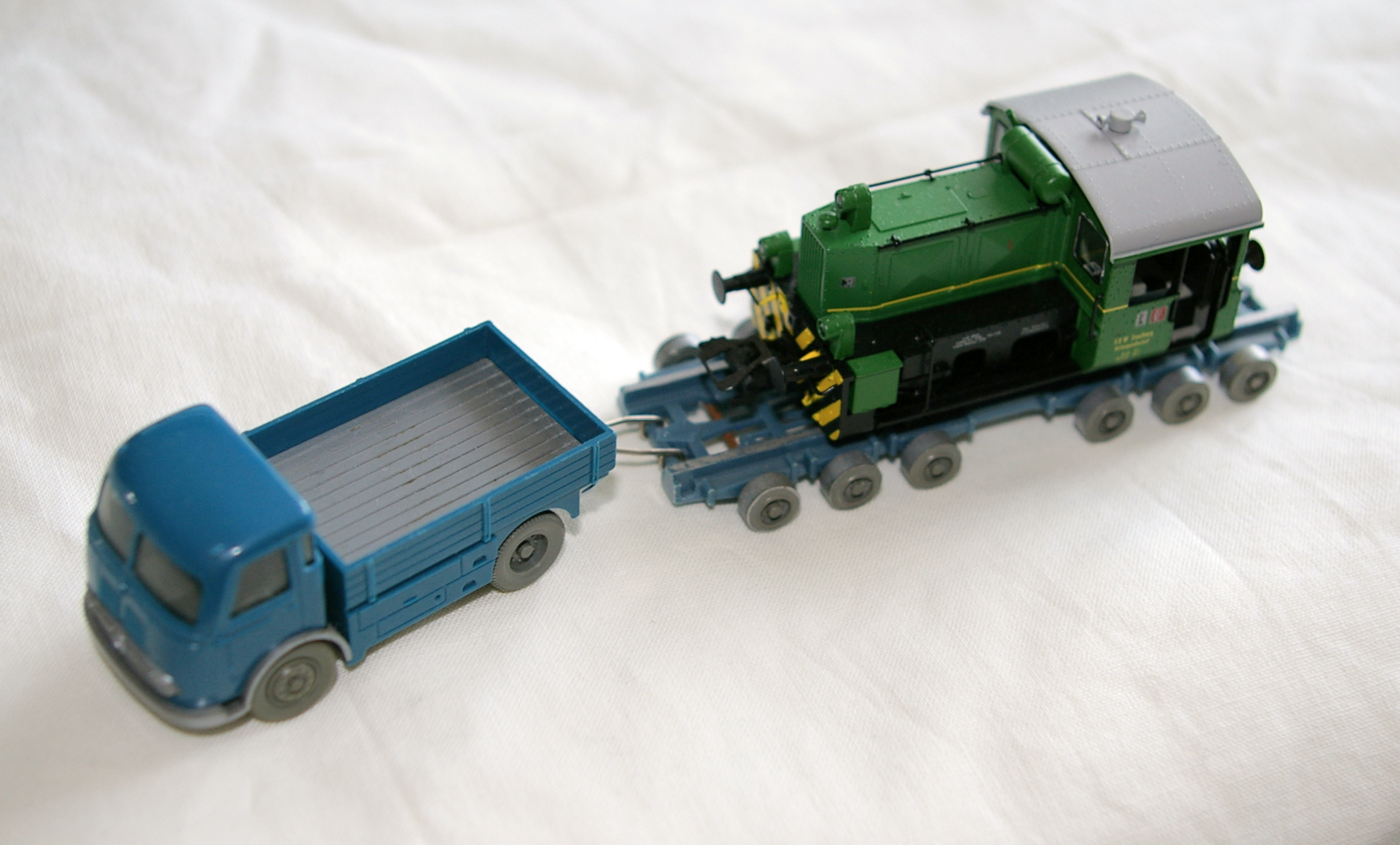
Model of a Culemeyer heavy trailer with tractor (Mercedes LPS 332, Wiking, ca. 1966) and shunter (Köf II, Märklin, 2007)

Johann Culemeyer (16 October 1883 - 20 January 1951) was a German engineer.

Culemeyer was born in Hanover in 1883 and, in 1936, he became a director of the Deutsche Reichsbahn and in that capacity was responsible for the construction, procurement and running of road vehicles, railway wagons and heavy transporters.

As early as 1931, he had designed a transportation system which was subsequently named after him, the "Culemeyer heavy trailer". This heavy road trailer enabled the transportation of goods wagons on the road. These trailers initially had four axles with 16 solid rubber wheels. From 1935, a six-axle, 24-wheel version was also produced.

Under the slogan Die Eisenbahn ins Haus ('The Railway to Your Door') goods wagons were brought to factories and other places that did not have their own railway links from the nearest loading station. It was patented on 29 November 1931 under the name Fahrbares Anschlussgleis ('Rail Link on Wheels') and demonstrated to the public for the first time on 24 April 1931 at the Anhalter Bahnhof in Berlin.

In the Deutsche Bundesbahn the trailers were hauled by Kaelble tractors; the Deutsche Reichsbahn (GDR) in East Germany used Tatra tractors.

Whilst Culemeyer heavy trailers have been largely superseded on the roads by lorries, in some factories and firms they are still used occasionally.

On 4 November 1976 a private road belonging to the management of the former Reichsbahn authority (VdeR) in Berlin-Marienfelde (Tempelhof) was named after Johann Culemeyer. The road is open to public traffic and is a cul-de-sac with several industrial sites along it, including the Berliner Werk der Converteam Deutschland that in 1984 moved there as the AEG-Stromrichterfabrik. In the vicinity, there is also the Schwechtenstrasse, named after the architect of the Anhalter Bahnhof.

Culemeyer died in 1951 in Nordholz, Cuxhaven, in north Germany.

== Sources ==
de:Johann Culemeyer
