= Halensee =

- Quarter of Berlin
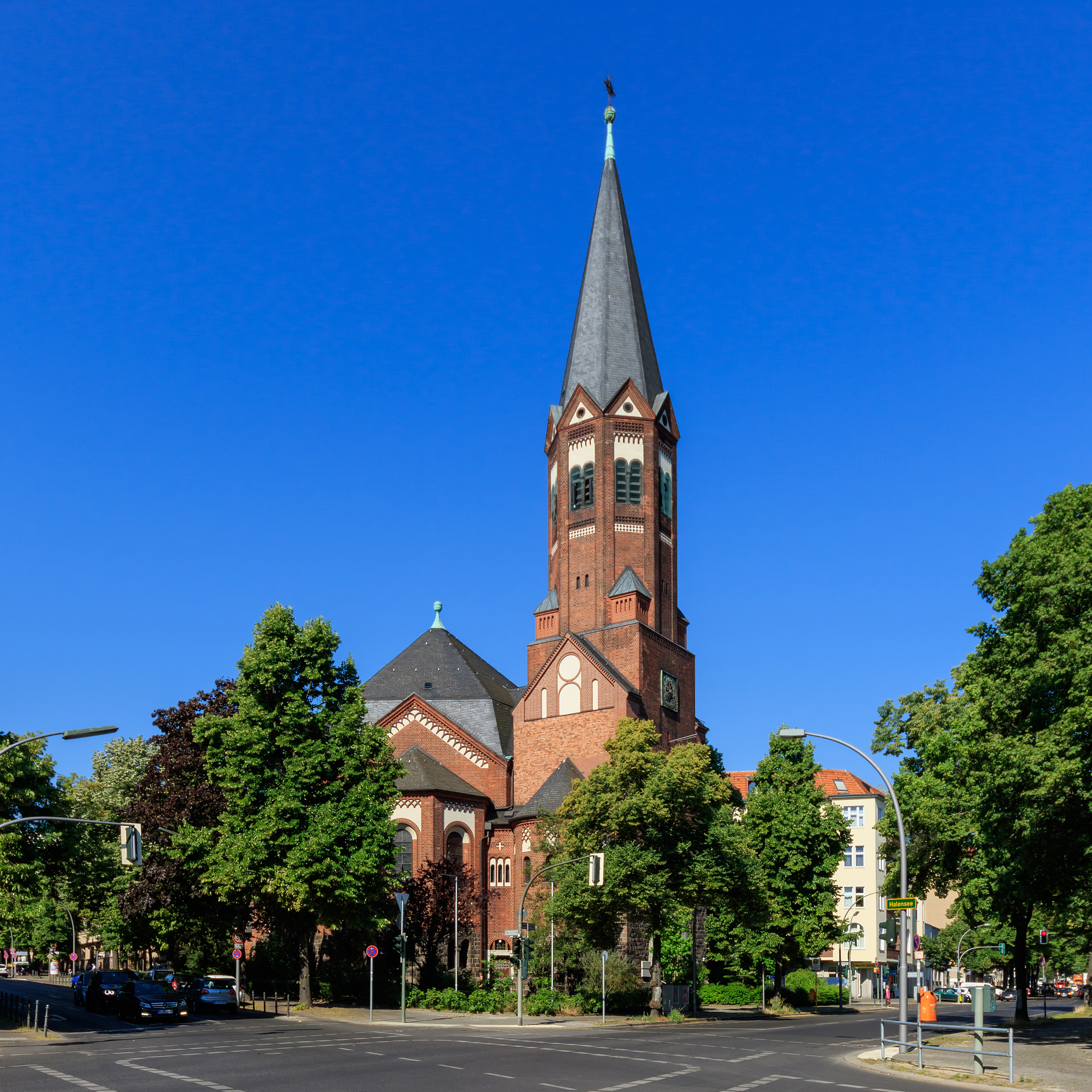
- Hochmeister Church

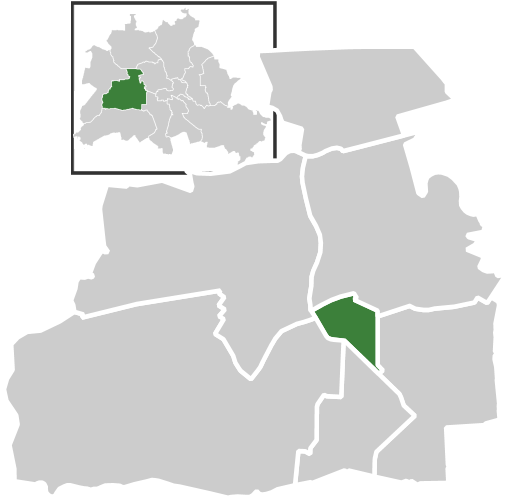
- Location of Halensee in Charlottenburg-Wilmersdorf and Berlin
- Interactive map of Halensee
- Location within Germany Location within Berlin
- Coordinates: 52°29′41″N 13°17′08″E
- Country: Germany
- State: Berlin
- City: Berlin
- Borough: Charlottenburg-Wilmersdorf
- Founded: 1880

Area
  - Total: 1.27 km^{2} (0.49 sq mi)
- Elevation: 52 m (171 ft)

Population (2024-12-31)
  - Total: 15,719
  - Density: 12,400/km^{2} (32,100/sq mi)
- Time zone: UTC+01:00 (CET)
  - Summer (DST): UTC+02:00 (CEST)
- Postal codes: 10709, 10711
- Vehicle registration: B

Halensee (German: [ˈhaːlən̩ˌzeː]) is a locality (Ortsteil) of Berlin in the district (Bezirk) of Charlottenburg-Wilmersdorf. Halensee was established as a villa and tenement settlement in about 1880, in the suburb of Wilmersdorf, which became part of Greater Berlin in 1920. In 2004, Halensee became its own Ortsteil. With an area of 1.27 km^{2} it is the smallest Ortsteil in Berlin after Hansaviertel.

== History ==
Halensee was the site of the German shooting championship in 1921. On 26 September, one Jannich won the competition firing an Ortgies semi-automatic pistol.

== Geography ==
The locality, the smallest of the Charlottenburg-Wilmersdorf district, is situated in its centre and borders with Charlottenburg, Wilmersdorf, Schmargendorf, Grunewald and Westend.

It is bounded by the Bundesautobahn 100 (Stadtring) in the west and the Cicerostraße, a branch-off of the Kurfürstendamm in the east. The locality is named after the small Halensee lake, which however is part of the neighbouring Grunewald locality.

== Transport ==
Halensee is served at Berlin-Halensee station and Berlin-Hohenzollerndamm station by the Berlin S-Bahn lines S4 (the circular Ringbahn) and S46.

== Education ==
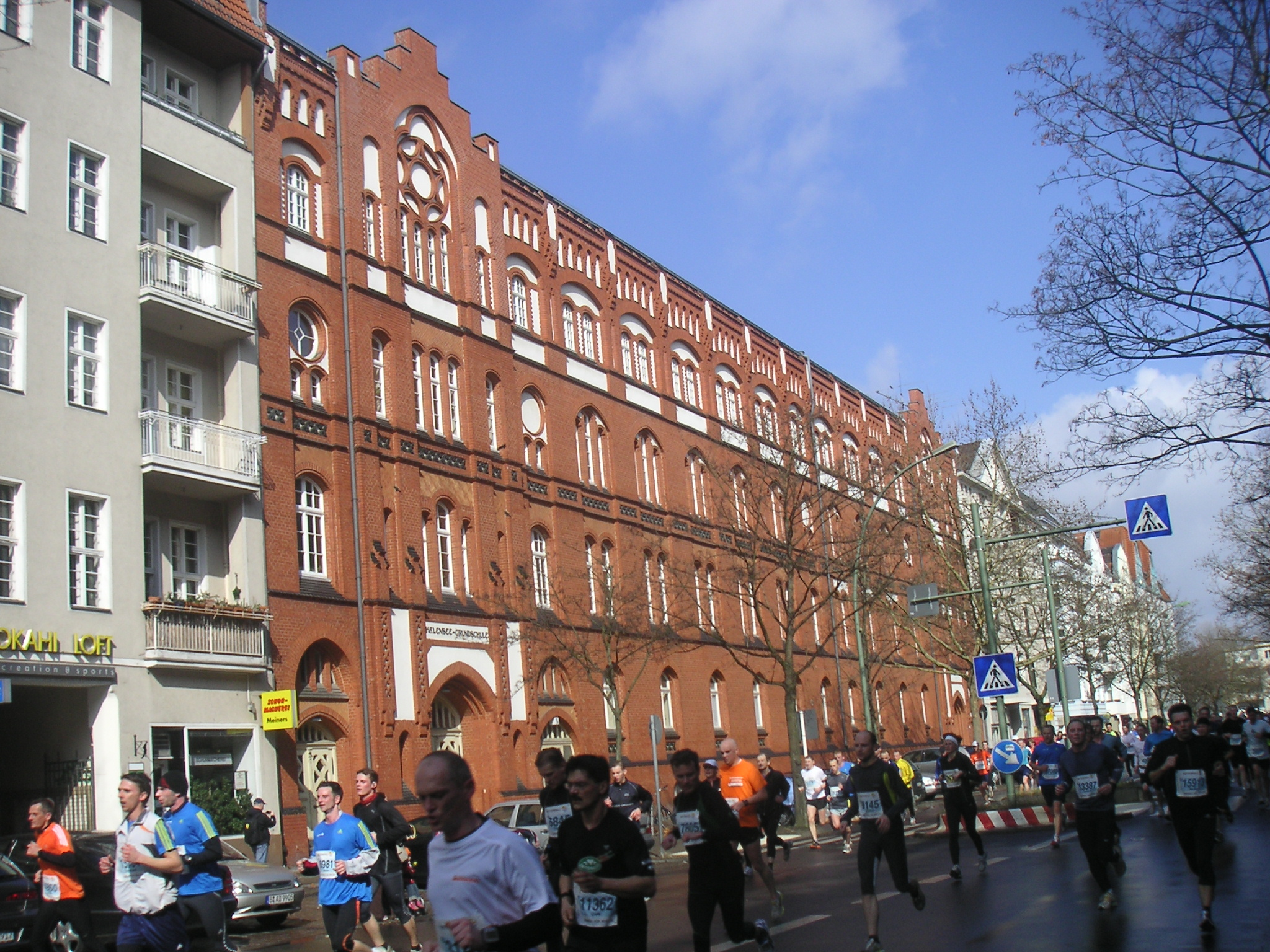
Halensee-Grundschule

Halensee-Grundschule, a primary school, is in Halensee.

The Japanische Ergänzungsschule in Berlin e.V. (ベルリン日本語補習授業校 Berurin Nihongo Hoshū Jugyō Kō), a weekend Japanese supplementary school, is held at Halensee-Grundschule.

== Photo gallery ==
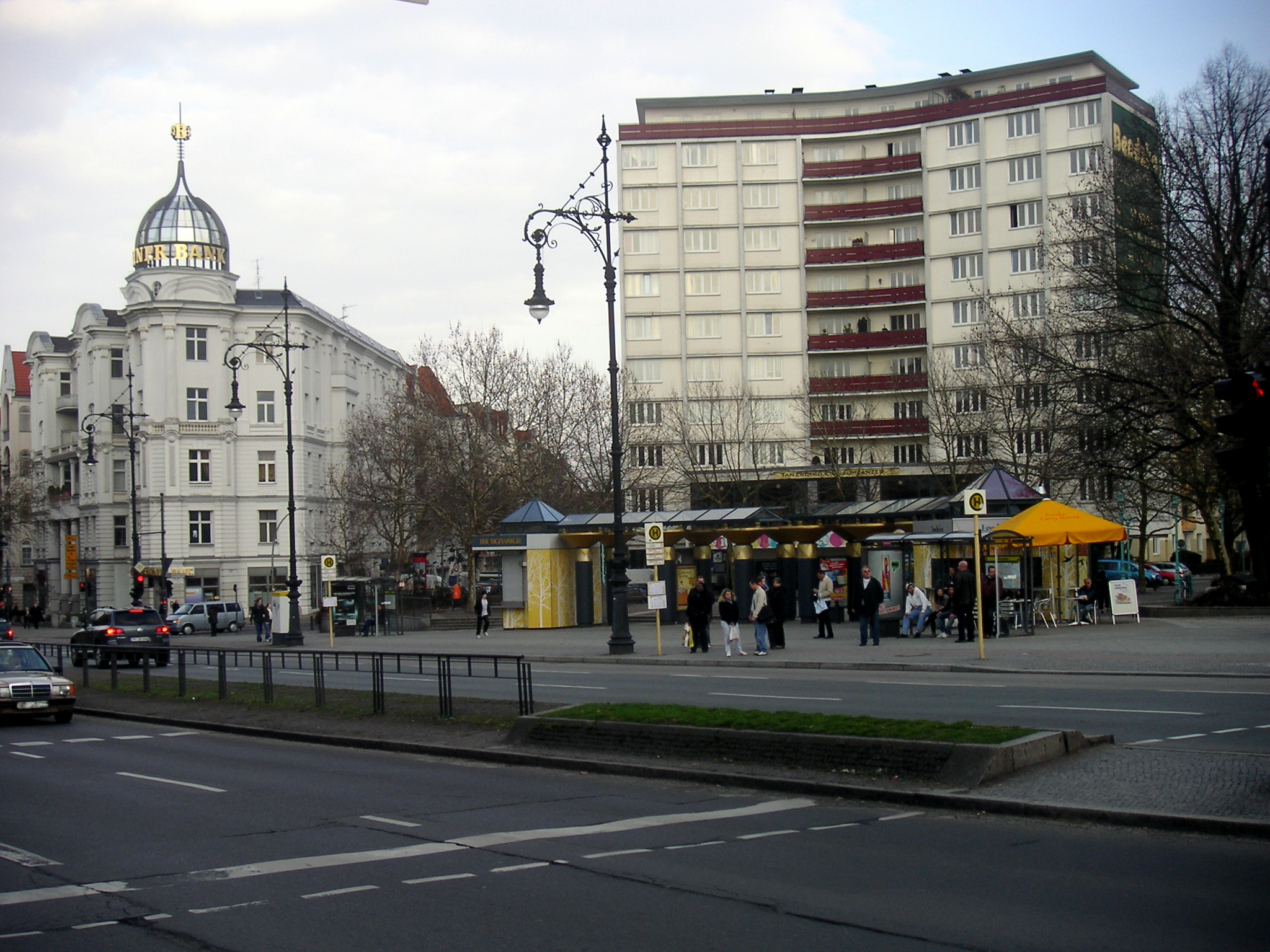
Old and new architecture at Henriettenplatz

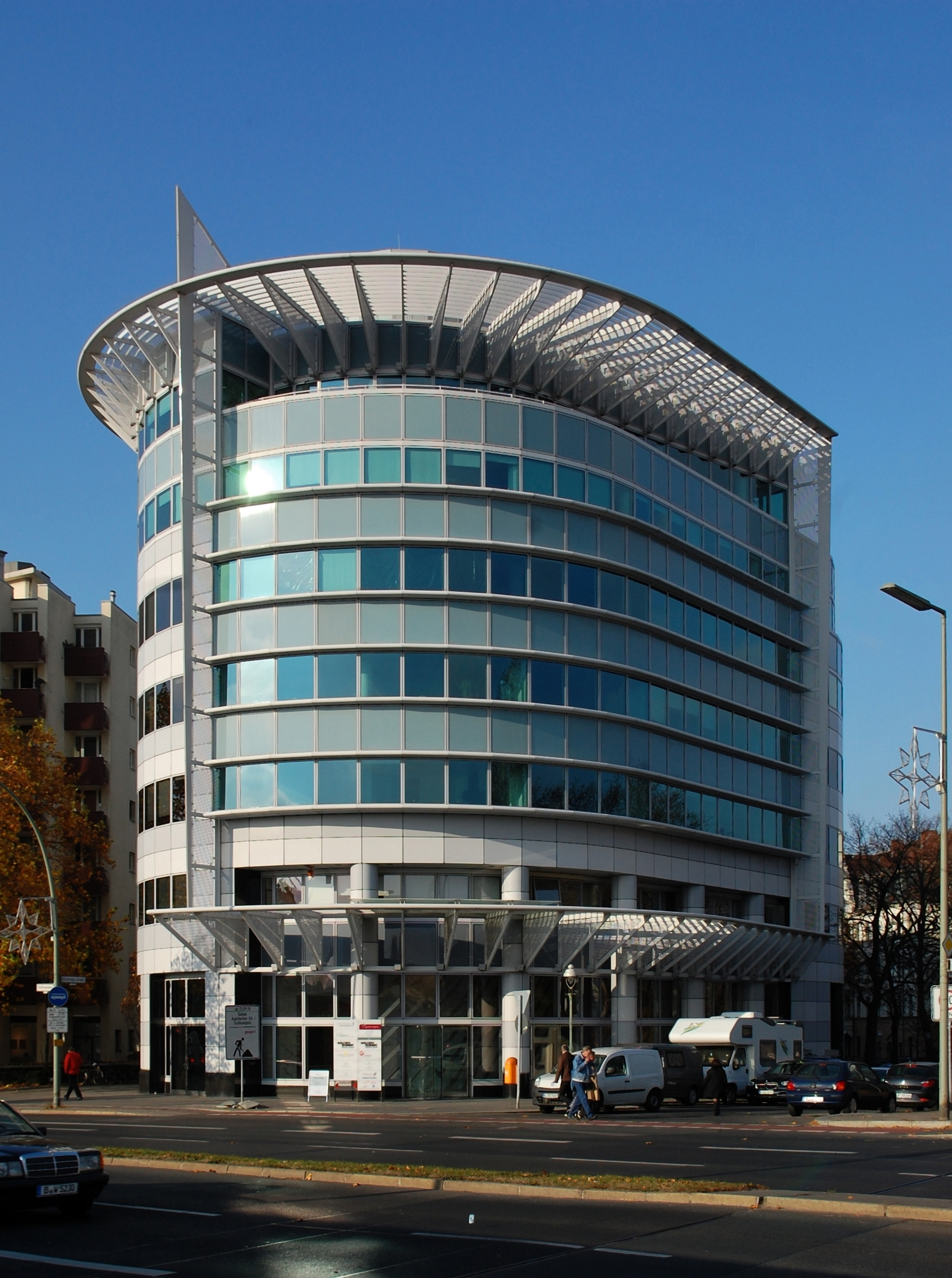
Office Building Kurfürstendamm

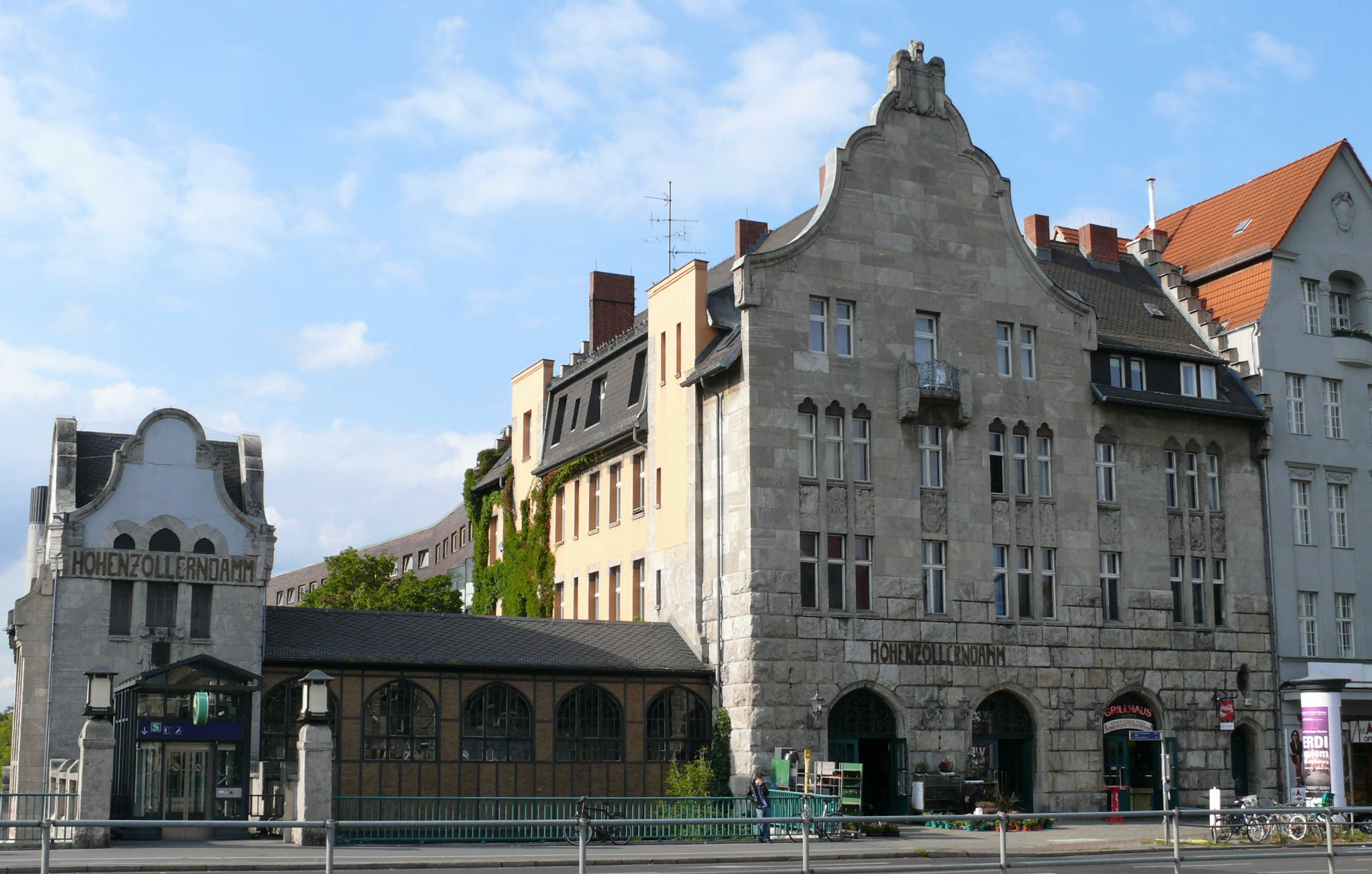
Berlin Hohenzollerndamm station

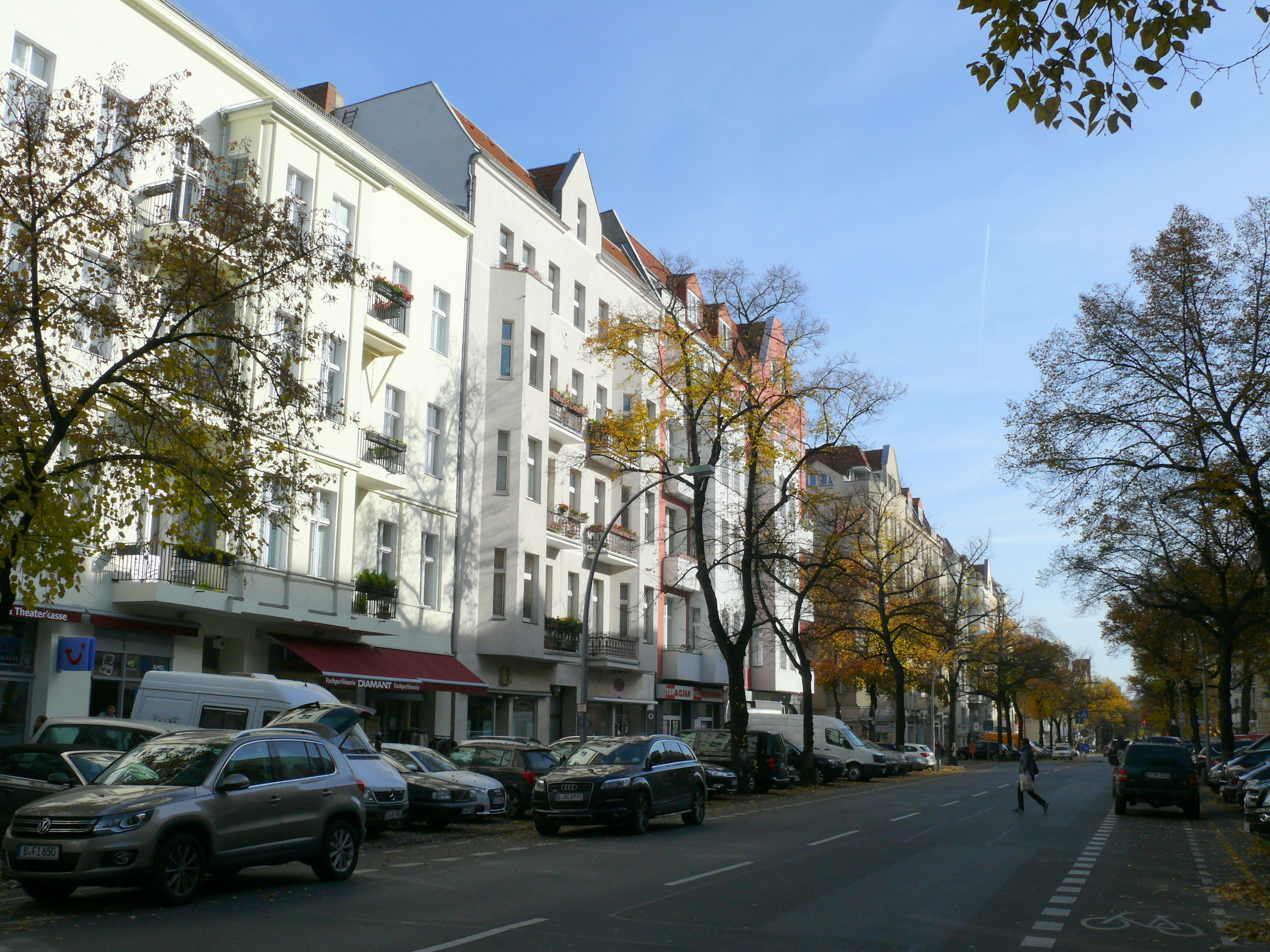
Westfälische Straße

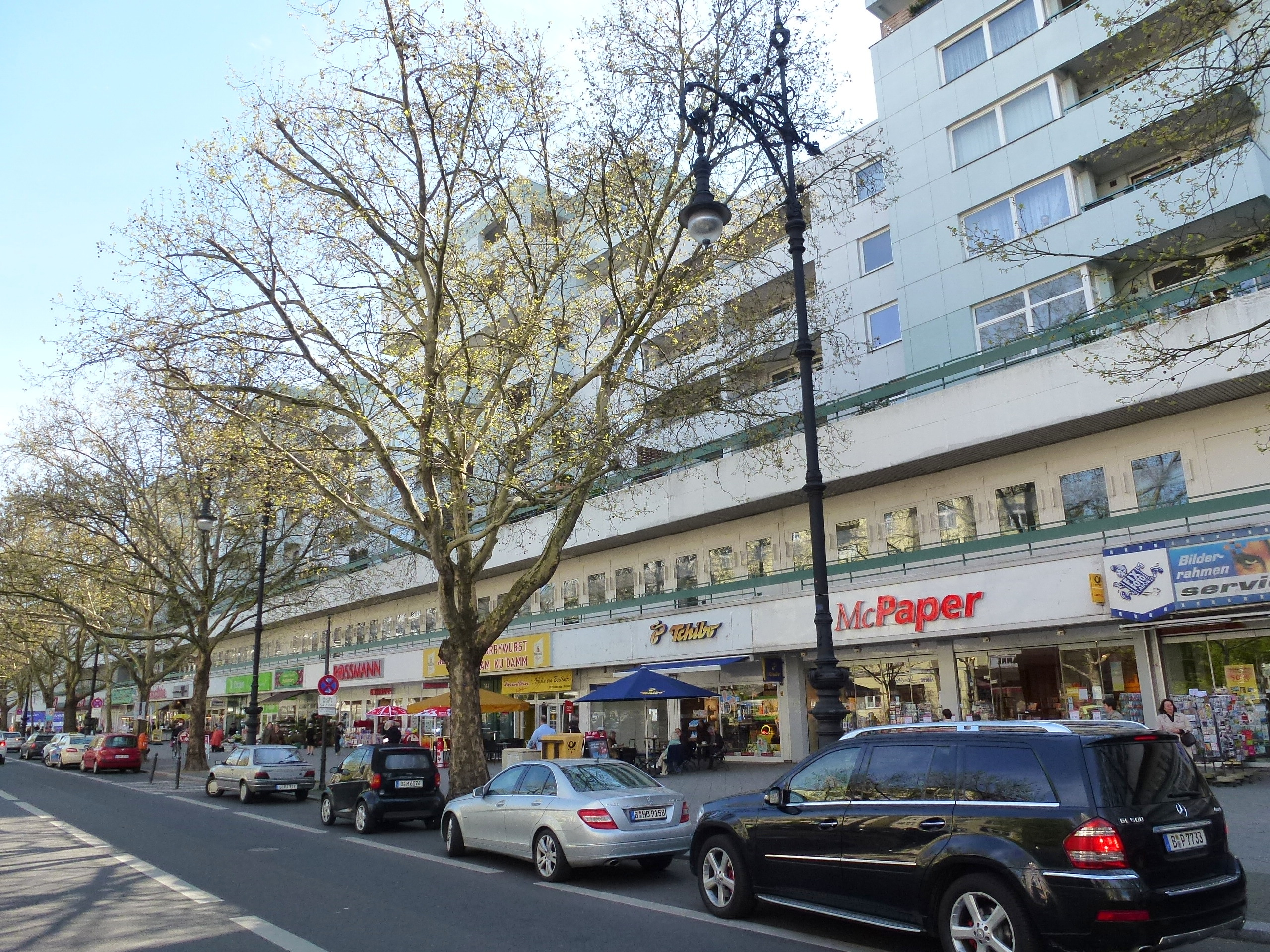
Kurfürstendamm-Center

== See also ==
- Electromote
