= Berlin-Halensee station =

Railway station in the Halensee (former Wilmersdorf) district of Berlin

Berlin Halensee
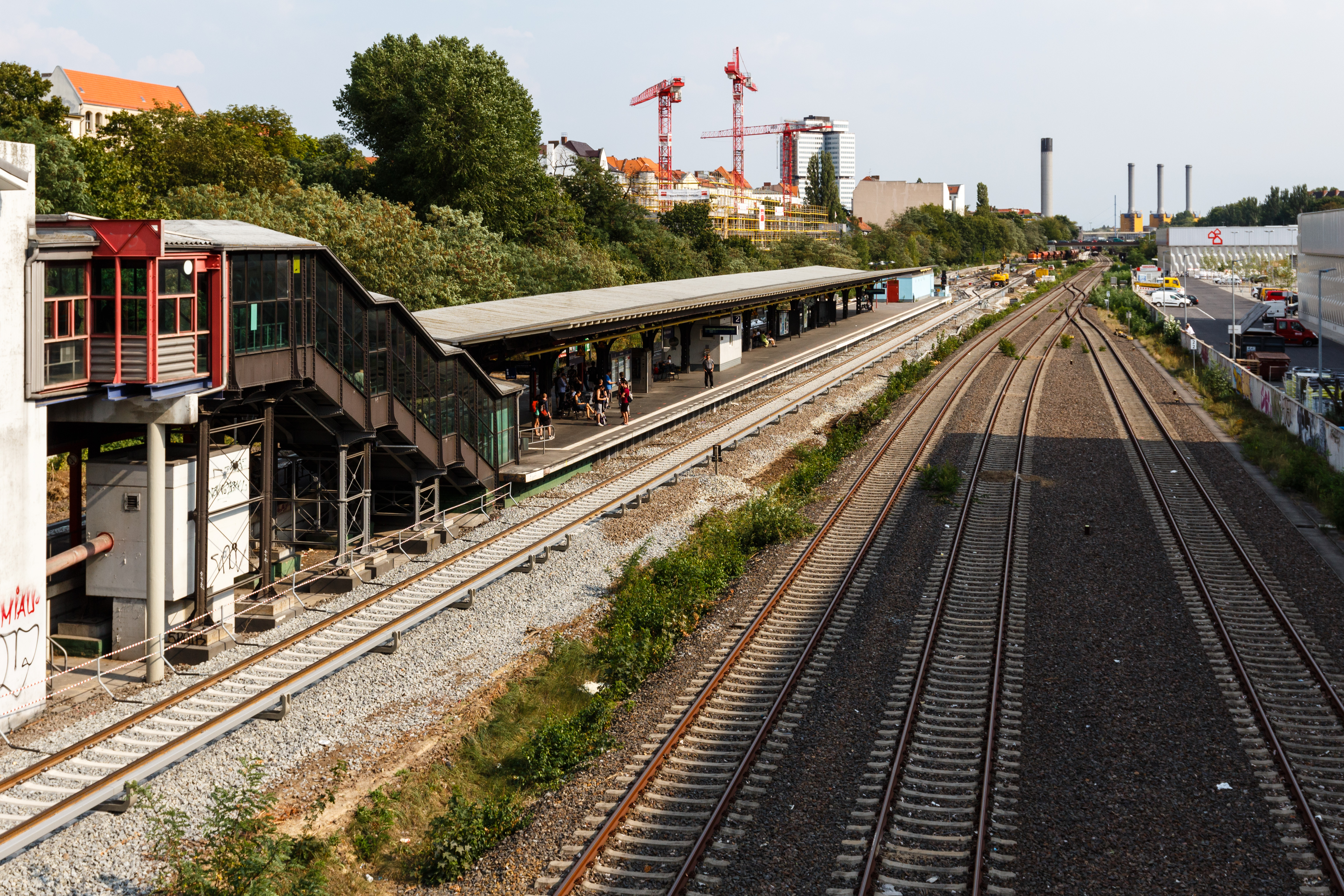

General information
- Location: Kurfürstendamm; 10711 Berlin; Charlottenburg-Wilmersdorf, Berlin, Berlin; Germany
- Coordinates: 52°29′46″N 13°17′26″E
- Line: Berlin Ringbahn
- Platforms: 1
- Tracks: 2

Construction
- Accessible: Yes

Other information
- Station code: 0542
- DS100 code: BHAL
- Category: 4
- Fare zone: VBB: Berlin A/5555
- Website: www.bahnhof.de; sbahn.berlin

Services
Preceding station	Berlin S-Bahn	Following station
Hohenzollerndamm One-way operation	S41	Westkreuz Ringbahn (clockwise)
Hohenzollerndamm Ringbahn (counter-clockwise)	S42	Westkreuz One-way operation
Westkreuz towards Westend	S46	Hohenzollerndamm towards Königs Wusterhausen
Location

Halensee is a station on the Berlin Ringbahn in the Halensee (former Wilmersdorf) district of Berlin. It is served by the S-Bahn lines S41, S42 and S46.

== Position ==
It is located at the prosaic western end of the Kurfürstendamm, one of Berlin's most famous and important boulevards and near the lake Halensee, after which the small locality of the city and the station take their names. The station is also served by four bus lines, two of which run continuously and one of which is an express service, as well as one line at night.

== History ==
The station was opened on 15 November 1877 along with the extension of the Ringbahn from Schöneberg to Moabit. It was initially established as a simple halt located south of the current platform on the site of a turning loop and was called Grunewald after the nearby Grunewald forest. The facility was rebuilt in 1884, with the old platform being removed in favour of a four-track turning system. To the north of it, two platforms were built for the Ringbahn and the trains were routed from here to and from the Stadtbahn via a newly installed connecting curve. At the same time, the name was changed to the current Halensee, while the nearby Hundekehle station on the Wetzlar Railway was renamed Grunewald. A stately entrance building on Kurfürstendamm completed the facility.

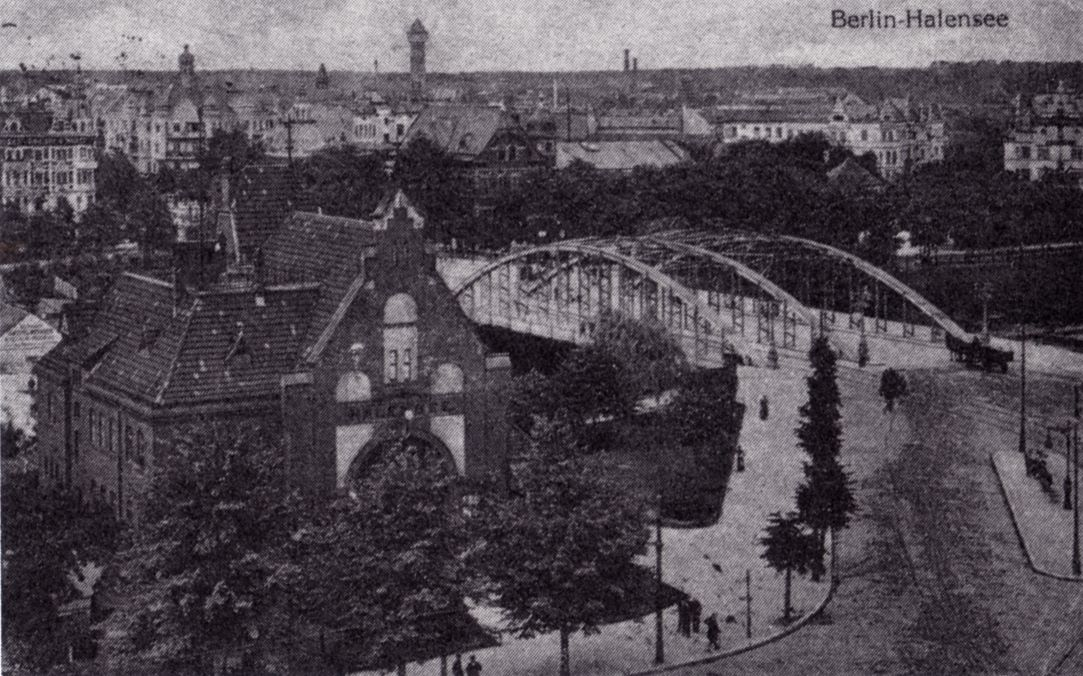
Halensee station, about 1900

The entrance building was a two-story brick building in the Romanesque Revival style. It was located at the northwest end of the station with exits to Kurfürstendamm and the adjacent Seesener Straße . The building was adjoined by the glazed entrances to the two platforms A and B, colloquially known as Gewächshäuser ("greenhouses"). The roof construction of the two platforms consisted of a central single-pillar roof construction that could only be found on the Ringbahn. Supports of this type can still be found at the Prenzlauer Allee station, among other places. The four-track turning system connected to the south, and the Stadtbahn and Ringbahn railways were separated north of the station.

Electrical operations began on 6 November 1928. For this purpose, all suburban transport systems were converted, the signals were converted, the platforms were increased to the height of 960 millimetres, which is still used today, and other measures were taken. The train groups that ran were train group A along the entire Ringbahn and the Südringspitzkehre (a prewar branch off the south ring to the Ringbahnhof of the Potsdamer Bahnhof), as well as train group G, which, coming from Mahlsdorf via the Eastern Railway and the Stadtbahn, swung onto the Ringbahn and then ran via the Neukölln–Baumschulenweg link to the Berlin–Görlitz railway towards Grünau. On Sundays, train group E was used for excursion traffic, which ran over the full ring.

According to Hitler's plans for a "world capital Germania" drawn up in the 1930s, the Ringbahn was to be fundamentally redeveloped. Halensee station would have had another single-track platform to the west of the existing platforms. The background was the creation of a connecting curve from the Ringbahn to the Stadtbahn, which, in contrast to the existing one, would have run to the west where a new Westbahnhof station was to be built, replacing Westkreuz station. This proposal never progressed beyond the planning stage.

During the Second World War, the entrance building was hit in Allied air raids and then burned down. The ruins remained there for another 15 years and continued to serve as the station access. The city was now divided, but the operational management of the S-Bahn was still the responsibility of Deutsche Reichsbahn.

At the instigation of the Berlin Senate, which had the Halensee Bridge rebuilt and ordered the demolition of the old entrance building in 1958, a new pavilion-style building was built on the same site in 1960. The client was the Administration of the Former Reichsbahn Assets.

=== S-Bahn boycott and Reichsbahn strike ===
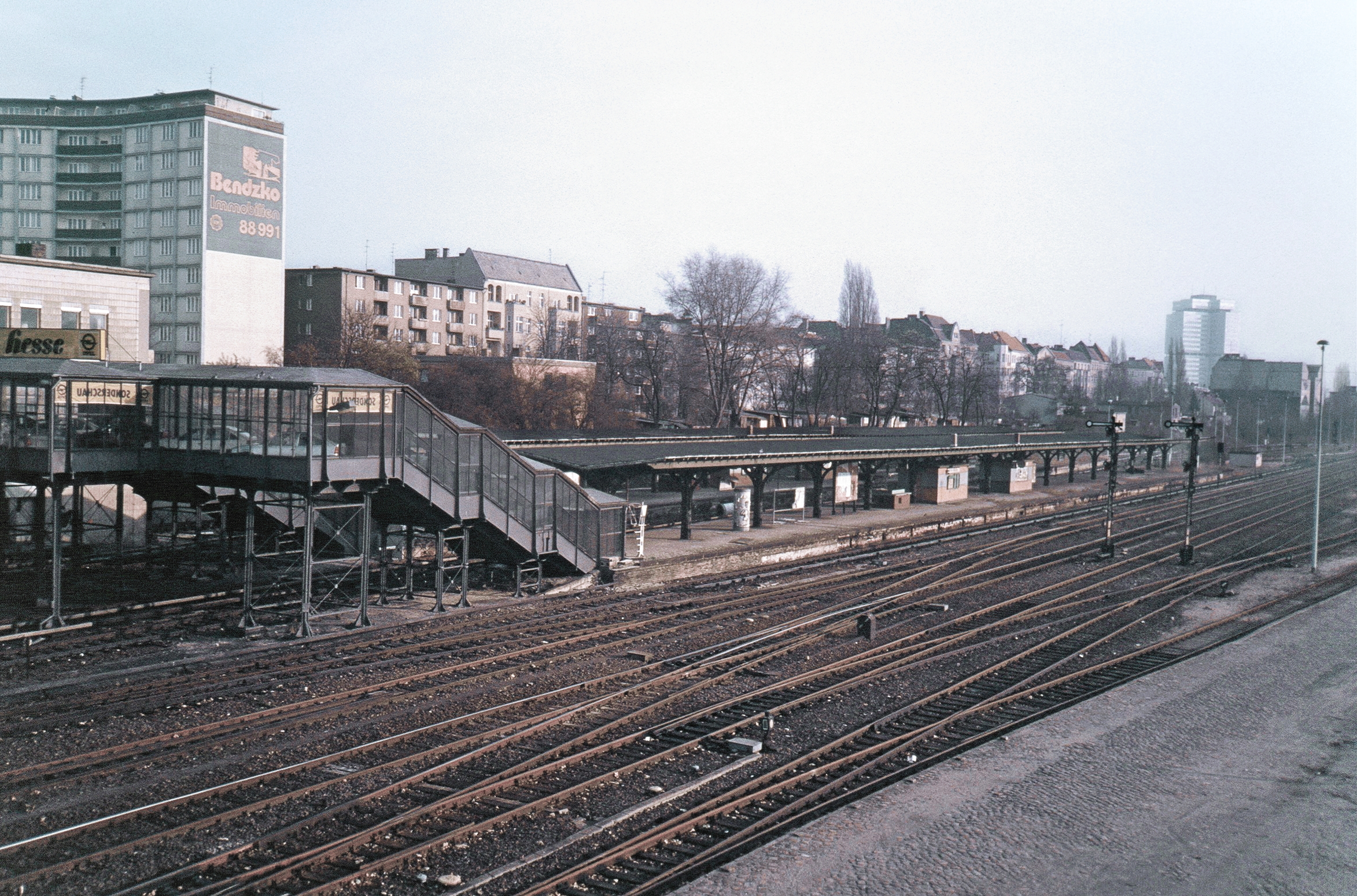
Disused S-Bahn station, 1986

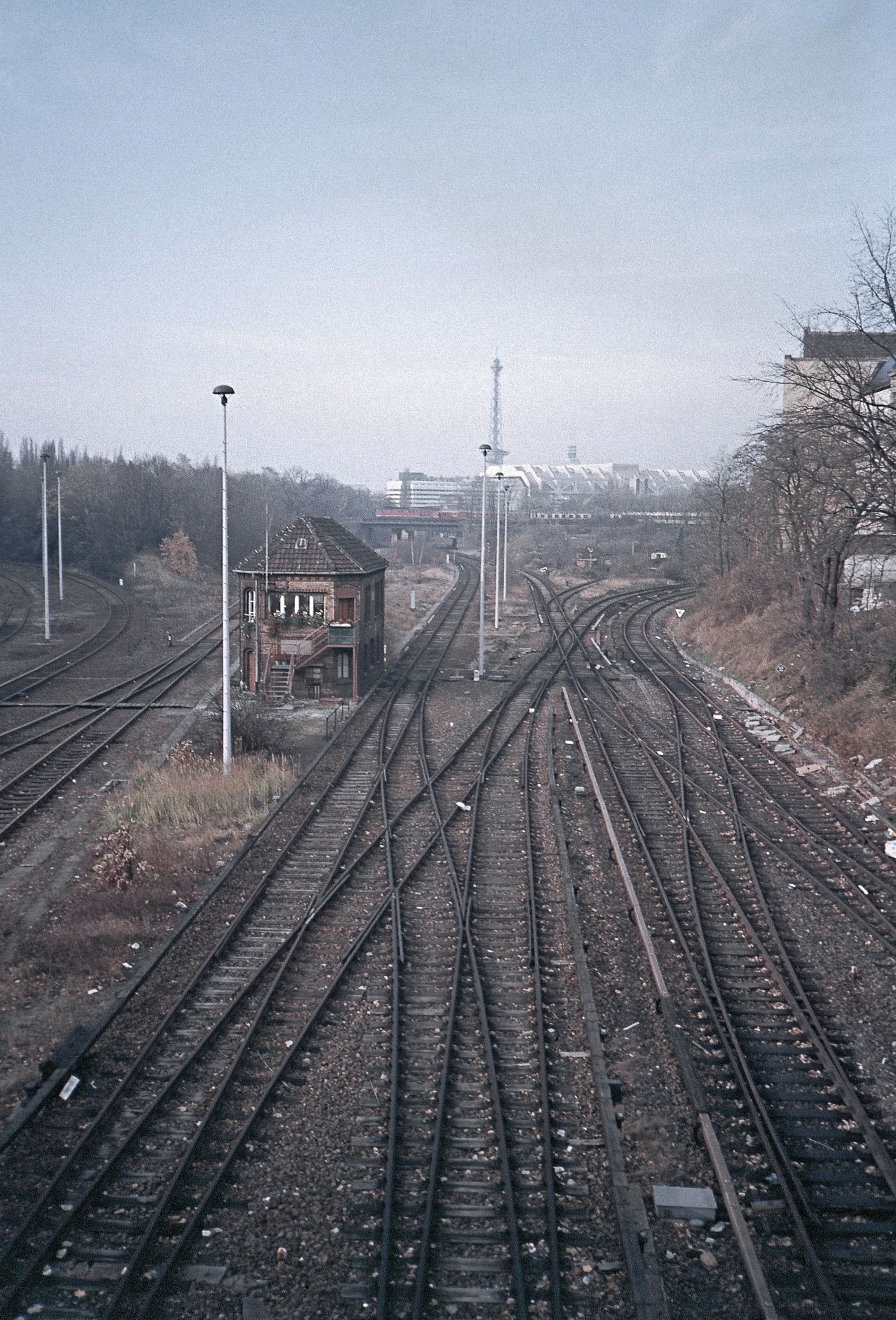
Hal signal box, on the right the south ring curve to the Stadtbahn, on the left the connecting curve to the Grunewald marshalling and freight yard, in the background the Wetzlar Railway, 1986

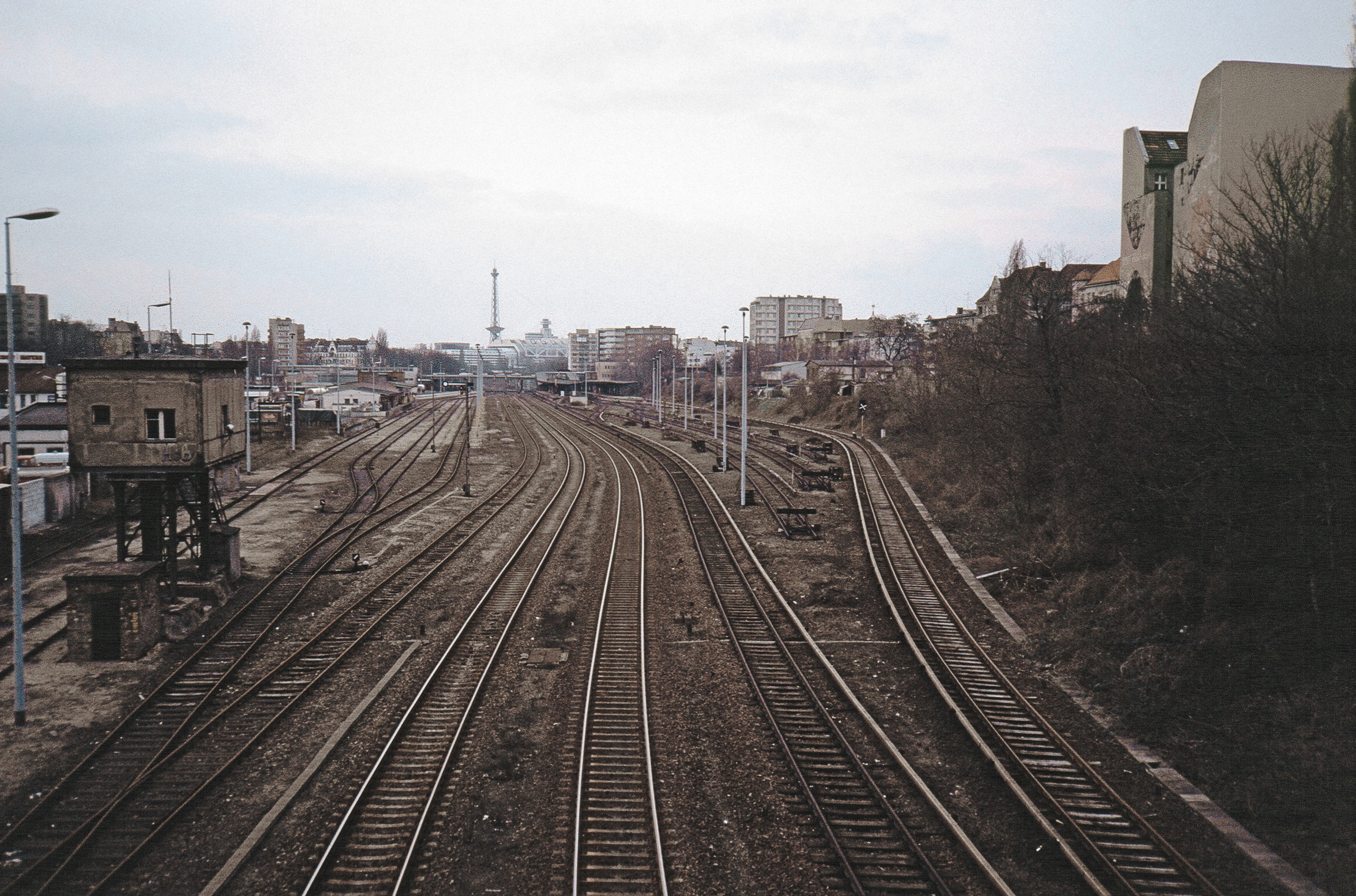
Halensee station (view from Paulsborn bridge), part of the freight yard on the left, 1989

Just four days after the Wall was built on 13 August 1961, a boycott of the S-Bahn was announced by the German Trade Union Confederation and Governing Mayor Willy Brandt. They said, "The S-Bahn driver pays for the border fortifications on the inner Berlin border". The campaign met with great approval early on and around 400,000 passengers turned away from the S-Bahn, although the traffic of East German citizens crossing West Berlin and now no longer being used was also a cause. Nevertheless, the Reichsbahn initially maintained the old frequency on train group A as late as 1980. However, from May 1976 the terminus alternated between Sonnenallee and Köllnische Heide. Train group G (Friedrichstrasse – Köllnische Heide) coming from the Stadtbahn was discontinued at the same time.

From May 1977 until the strike in 1980, train group C ran between Zoo and Sonnenallee (previously from Gesundbrunnen) during peak hour.

Due to the drastic decline in passenger numbers, the Reichsbahn was increasingly forced to scale down operations. However, thinning out the timetable alone was not enough to compensate for the annual deficit of 120 to 140 million Marks (adjusted for purchasing power in today's currency: around €159.4m). This also resulted in staff savings. However, the remaining West Berlin Reichsbahn workers complained about the extra work they had to do and about the lower pay compared to other companies in West Berlin. When the DR announced further cost-cutting measures in September 1980, the first work stoppages occurred on 15 September. Two days later the strike reached its climax, with all traffic in the west being stopped. Reichsbahn workers occupied the Hal signal box in the station. The following train drivers are also said to have removed the main fuses of the trains so that any strike breakers could not continue operations.

However, the West Berlin police were unable to clear the signal box because the systems were owned by DR and therefore did not belong to the territory of West Berlin. The signal box was not cleared until 22 September when the railway police, which consisted of West Berlin Reichsbahn officers and British soldiers, acted. The eight strikers were subsequently arrested.

Three days later, the strike had largely subsided so that the next steps could be determined. The Ringbahn was then shut down and operations were only maintained on the Stadtbahn along with the north-south tunnel and the adjacent routes.

=== Interim use and reopening ===
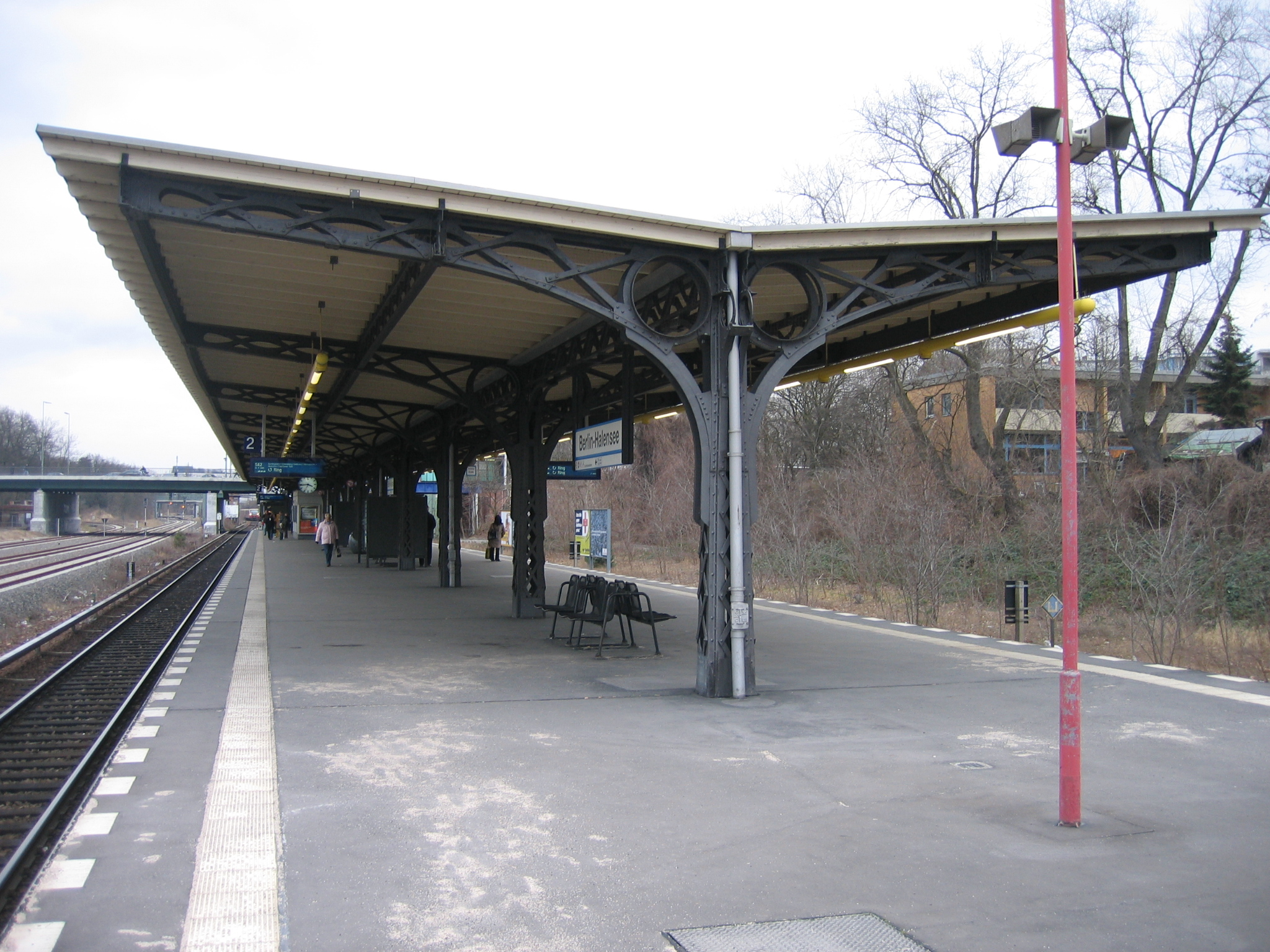
Platform, 2008

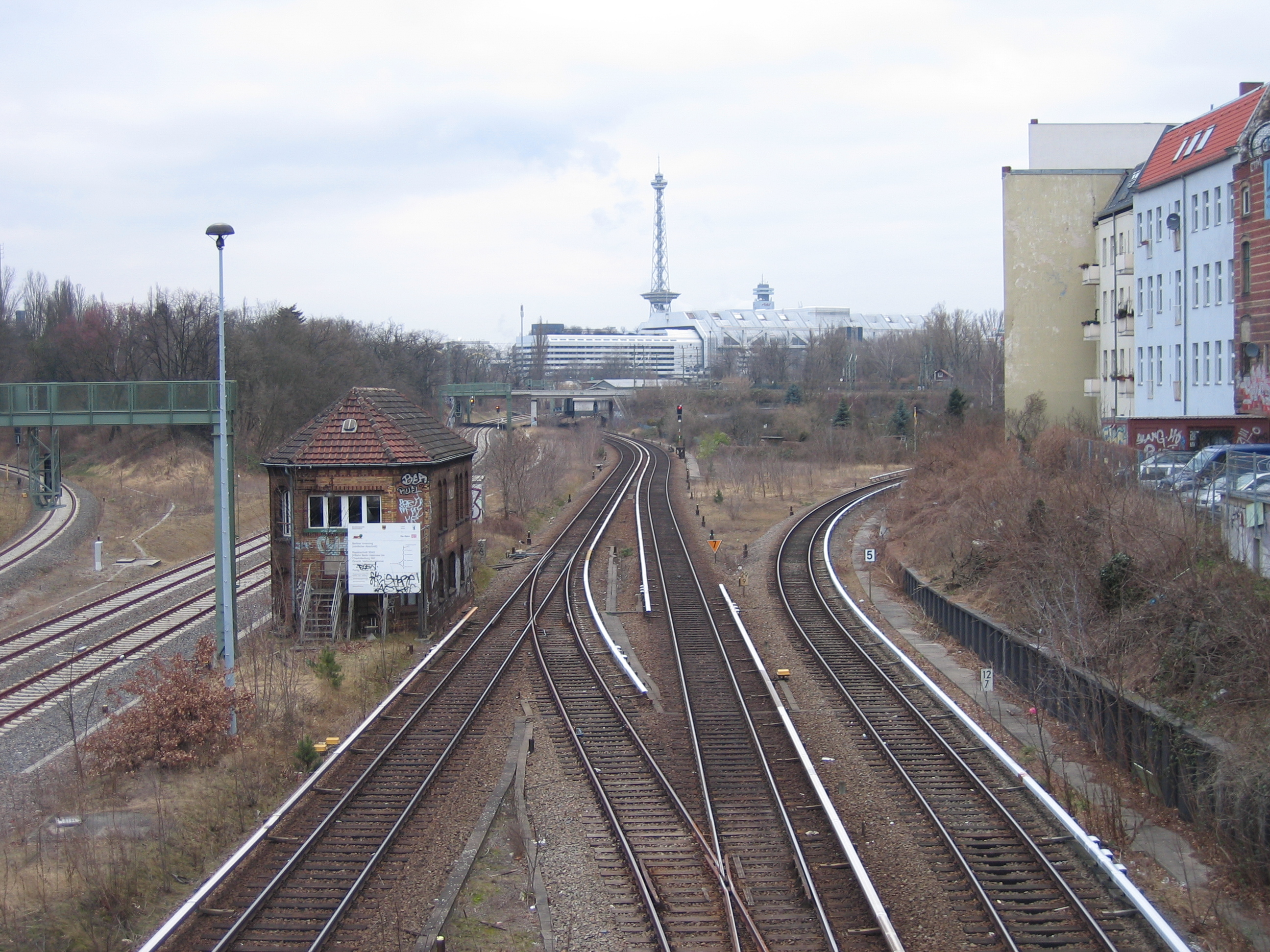
Hal signal box, on the right the junction to the southern curve from the Ringbahn to the Stadtbahn, 2008

After the temporary closure, the station area increasingly fell into disrepair. The entrance building and the glazed transition was used as a showroom for a car dealership from 1985, but the former was demolished in 1993. In the years that followed, numerous discussions arose about reopening the line. Among the various suggestions as to how the railway systems should be restored, there was also the option of "capping" the S-Bahn route including the parallel urban motorway, i.e. converting the entire route into a tunnel. The area above would have had space for 1,400-1,600 apartments. However, the lack of private investors meant that the project was put on hold.

In 1989 the decision was made to put the Ringbahn back into operation by 1991. Initially only the Westend–Schöneberg section was to go into operation. However, due to the reunification of the two halves of the city at the same time, it was decided to reopen the line through to Baumschulenweg.

The station was then extensively repaired. Since the southern curve from the Ringbahn to the Stadtbahn, which now had one track, was only to be used for non-passenger operations, one platform was sufficient; the old platform A was then removed. The surface and superstructure of the remaining platform were renewed and the roof structure was also replaced. The glazed aisles were retained in a more contemporary form. The station also received an elevator. The reversing system in the south, on the other hand, was reduced to just one track, as the new line runs through the remaining area. Shortly before it was put back into operation, the old entrance building was demolished due to its dilapidation. The area is still vacant. The section was formally reopened on 17 December 1993.

Since the end of 2015, train dispatch has been carried out by the driver using a driver's cab monitor (ZAT-FM).

Although there is still space for a second platform and the station was initially only temporarily modernised, there are currently no plans to expand it. The covering of the Ringbahn section in the Halensee area is also not currently proposed. In addition to the lack of investors, Deutsche Bahn also has had other plans for the site at times.
