= Peter Longerich =

German professor of history (born 1955)

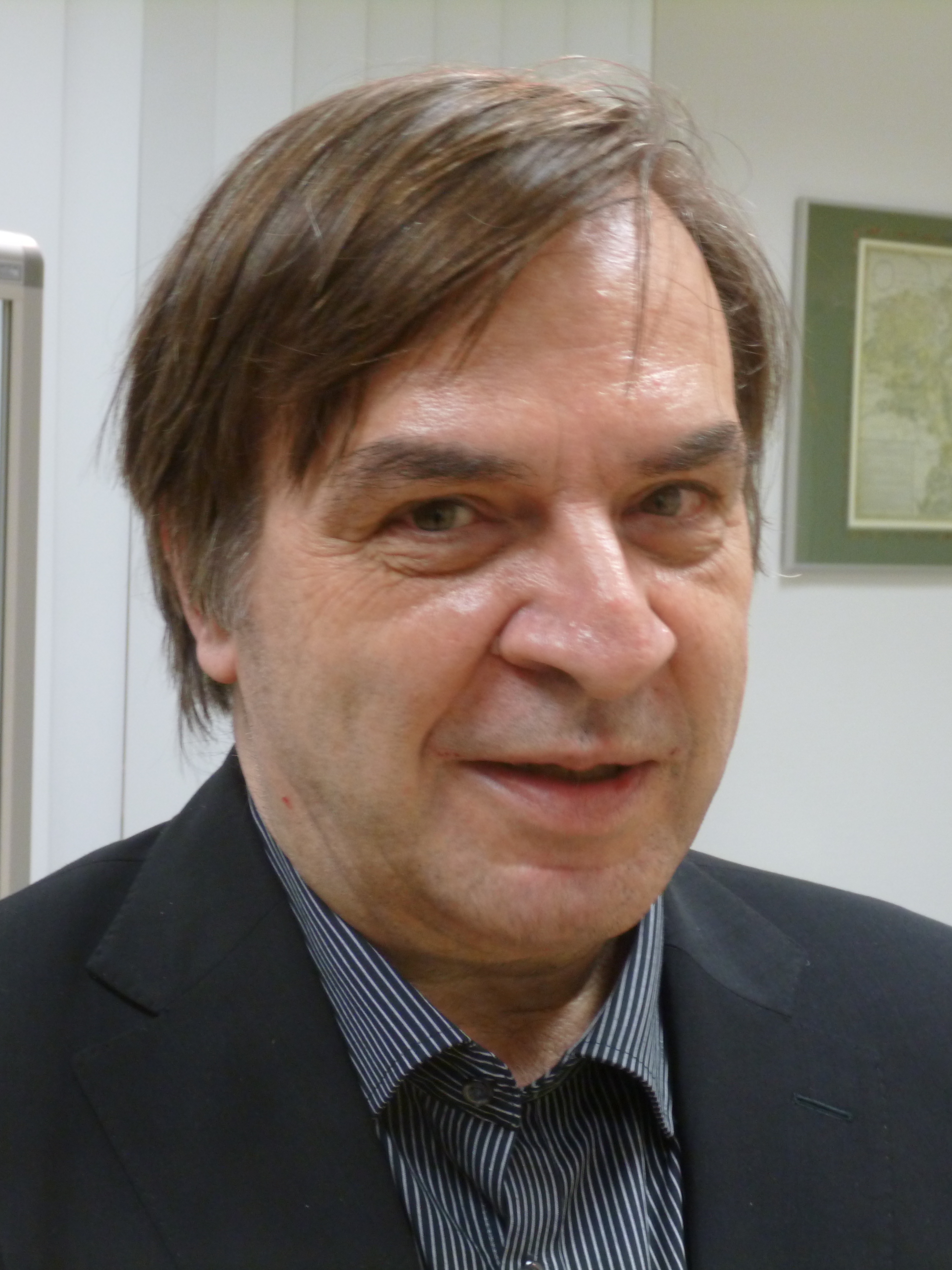
- Longerich in 2015
- Born: Heinz Peter Longerich; 1955 (age 70–71); Krefeld, West Germany (now Germany)
- Occupation: Historian

Academic background
- Education: LMU Munich

Academic work
- Notable works: The Unwritten Order: Hitler's Role in the Final Solution; Holocaust: The Nazi Persecution and Murder of the Jews; Heinrich Himmler: A Life; Goebbels: A Biography

Heinz Peter Longerich (born 1955 in Krefeld) is a German professor of history and historian. He is regarded by Ian Kershaw, Richard Evans, Timothy Snyder, Mark Roseman and Richard Overy, as one of the leading German authorities on the Holocaust.

== Career ==
Longerich studied at LMU Munich and received a Ph.D. in history and an M.A. in history and sociology.

From 2002 until 2003, Longerich was the third holder of the Visiting Chair at the Fritz Bauer Institute in Frankfurt. From 2003 until 2004, he was J.B. and Maurice Shapiro Senior Scholar in Residence at the Centre for Advanced Holocaust Studies at the United States Holocaust Memorial Museum in Washington DC, where he worked on a biography of Heinrich Himmler. From 2005 to 2006, he was a Fellow at the Wissenschaftszentrum Nordrhein-Westfalen.

Longerich was director of the Research Centre for the Holocaust and Twentieth-Century History at Royal Holloway, University of London (RHUL), where he worked alongside David Cesarani. In 2015, he left his position at Royal Holloway and returned to Germany. His major research interests include the history of the Weimar Republic, the Third Reich, the Second World War, the Holocaust, Heinrich Himmler, and Joseph Goebbels.

He has appeared in the media to comment upon the links between Adolf Hitler and the Holocaust, as well as on related topics, and has published, in 2001, a book documenting Hitler's pivotal role in the Holocaust entitled The Unwritten Order. The book arose from his expert testimony at the David Irving trial. Reviewing Longerich's work, Timothy Snyder declared Holocaust "profound" and Heinrich Himmler: A Life "magnificent".

== Published works ==
English

- The Unwritten Order: Hitler's Role in the Final Solution. Stroud: Tempus Publishing. 2003 [2001]. ISBN 978-0-7524-2564-1.
- Holocaust: The Nazi Persecution and Murder of the Jews. Oxford: University Press. 2010. ISBN 978-0-19-280436-5.
- Heinrich Himmler: A Life. Oxford: University Press. 2011. ISBN 978-0-19-959232-6.
- Goebbels: A Biography. Random House. 2015. ISBN 978-1400067510.
- Hitler: A Life. OUP Oxford. 2019. ISBN 978-0198796091.
- Wannsee, The Road to the Final Solution. OUP Oxford. 2021. ISBN 978-0198834045.

German

- (1989). Die braunen Bataillone. Geschichte der SA. Beck, Munich. ISBN 3-406-33624-8.
- (1992). Hitlers Stellvertreter. Führung der NSDAP und Kontrolle des Staatsapparates durch den Stab Heß und Bormanns Partei-Kanzlei. K.G. Saur. ISBN 3-598-11081-2.
- (1998). Politik der Vernichtung. Eine Gesamtdarstellung der nationalsozialistischen Judenverfolgung. Piper: Munich. ISBN 3-492-03755-0.
- (1998). Die Wannsee-Konferenz vom 20. Januar 1942. Planung und Beginn des Genozid an den Europäischen Juden. Hentrich: Berlín. ISBN 3-89468-250-7.
- (2001). Der ungeschriebene Befehl. Hitler und der Weg zur „Endlösung“. Piper: Munich. ISBN 3-492-04295-3.
- (2006). „Davon haben wir nichts gewusst!“ Die Deutschen und die Judenverfolgung 1933–1945. Siedler: Munich. ISBN 3-88680-843-2.
- (2008). Heinrich Himmler: Eine Biographie. Siedler: Munich. ISBN 978-3-88680-859-5.
- (2010). Goebbels. Biographie. Siedler: Munich. ISBN 978-3-88680-887-8.
- (2015). Hitler. Biographie. Siedler: Munich. ISBN 978-3-8275-0060-1.
- (2016). Wannseekonferenz. Der Weg zur „Endlösung“. Pantheon: Munich. ISBN 3570553442.
- (2021). Antisemitismus: Eine deutsche Geschichte. Von der Aufklärung bis heute. Siedler: Munich. ISBN 978-3-8275-0067-0.
- (2022). Außer Kontrolle. Deutschland 1923. Molden, Vienna 2022, ISBN 978-3-222-15102-6.
