= Karl Kaufmann =

German Nazi, Gauleiter and Reichsstatthalter of Hamburg (1900–1969)

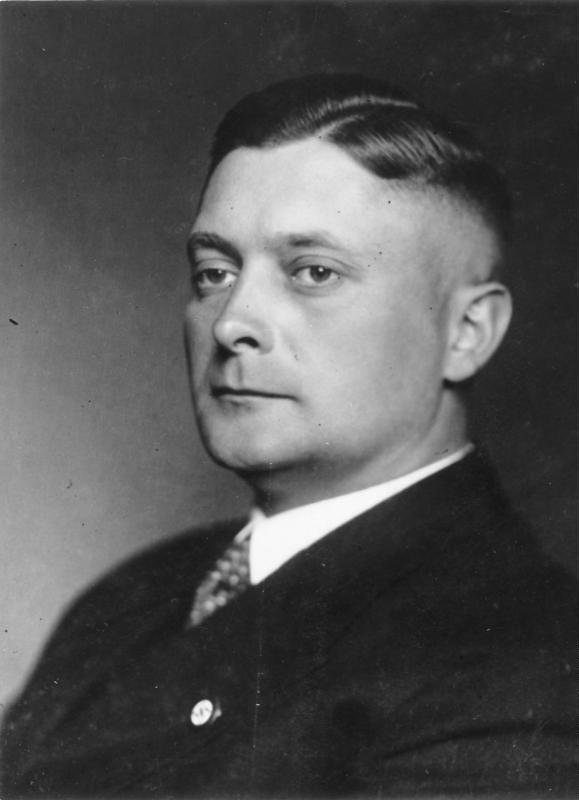

Reichsstatthalter of Hamburg
- In office 16 May 1933 – 3 May 1945
- Preceded by: Office created
- Succeeded by: Office abolished

Gauleiter of Gau Hamburg
- In office 15 April 1929 – 3 May 1945
- Preceded by: Hinrich Lohse
- Succeeded by: Office abolished

Gauleiter of Gau Rhein-Ruhr (later, Großgau Ruhr)
- In office 7 March 1926 – 1 October 1928
- Preceded by: Position created
- Succeeded by: Position abolished

Gauleiter of Gau Rhineland-North
- In office July 1925 – 7 March 1926
- Preceded by: Axel Ripke
- Succeeded by: Position abolished

Personal details
- Born: Karl Otto Kurt Kaufmann; 10 October 1900 Krefeld, Rhine Province, Kingdom of Prussia, German Empire
- Died: 4 December 1969 (aged 69) Hamburg, West Germany
- Party: Nazi Party (NSDAP)

Military service
- Allegiance: German Empire
- Branch/service: Imperial German Army
- Years of service: 1917–1918
- Unit: Brunswick Infantry Regiment 92
- Battles/wars: World War I

Karl Kaufmann (10 October 1900 – 4 December 1969) was a German politician who served as a Nazi Party Gauleiter from 1925 to 1945 and as the Reichsstatthalter (Reich Governor) of Hamburg from 1933 to 1945.

== Early life ==
Kaufmann was the son of a textile manufacturer. He attended Realschule in Elberfeld until age 16 and then trained as an agricultural worker. He entered military service during the First World War and underwent pilot training but, due to a vision loss, was transferred to Brunswick Infantry Regiment 92. He was hospitalized for pneumonia and was discharged at the end of the war without having seen front line action.

From February 1919 to May 1920, Kaufmann was a Freikorps member of the Marinebrigade Ehrhardt. In 1920, he joined the Deutschvölkischer Schutz- und Trutzbund, the largest most active, and most influential antisemitic federation in Germany and, in 1921, he took over the leadership of their youth group in Elberfeld. In 1921, as a member of the Freikorps "von Killinger", he participated in actions against Polish insurgents in Upper Silesia. In 1921–22 he took part in illegal sabotage operations against the French occupation of the Ruhr. Wanted by the police, he fled to Bavaria.

== Nazi Party career ==
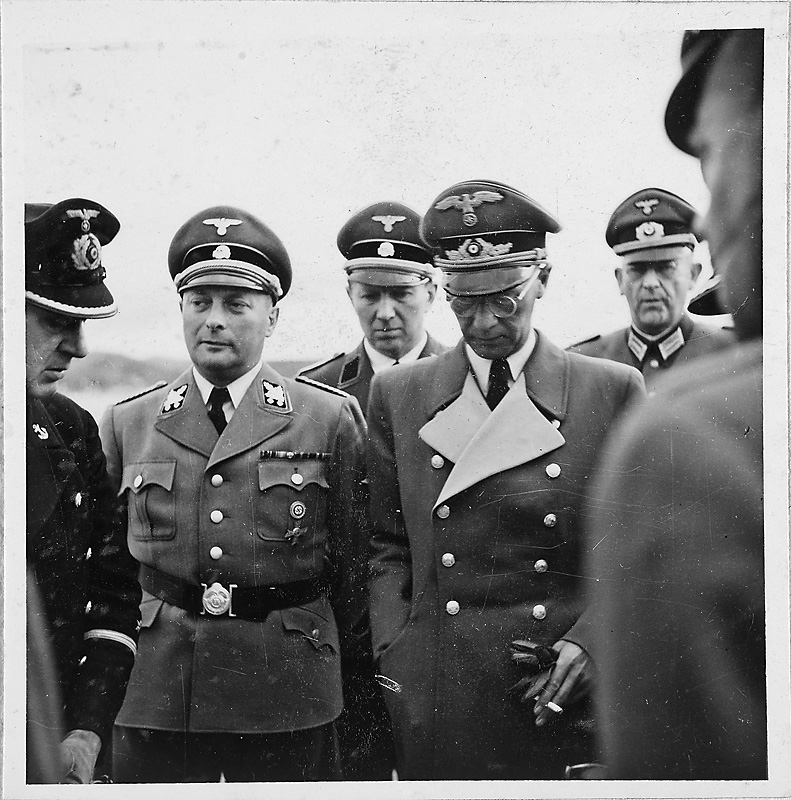
Gauleiter, Reichsstatthalter, and SS-Obergruppenführer Kaufmann visiting Norway July 1942 in his capacity as Reichskommissar für die deutsche Seefahrt (RKS). Josef Terboven, Reichskommissar for Norway during the Nazi occupation 1940–1945, to his left. Photo: National Archives of Norway

Kaufmann joined the Nazi Party (NSDAP) in 1921. Though his membership number was unknown, in 1935 he was retroactively granted membership number 95. He co-founded the Nazi Party in the Ruhr area, establishing Ortsgruppen (local groups) in Elberfeld, Essen, Bochum and other cities. During this time, he was working as a woodworker and construction worker and joined the Sturmabteilung (SA). He participated in the failed Beer Hall Putsch of November 1923 in Munich, then fled to Westphalia. He was arrested, briefly detained and then moved to Upper Bavaria where he worked as a laborer. In February 1925 when the ban on the Nazi Party was lifted, he moved back to the Ruhr and rejoined the SA.

In July 1925, at the age of only 25, Kaufmann became Acting Gauleiter of Gau Rheinland-North in a power sharing agreement with Joseph Goebbels and Viktor Lutze. This lasted until 26 September when Kaufmann was granted sole control. In September 1925, he became a member of the National Socialist Working Association, a short-lived group of northern and western German Gauleiter, organized and led by Gregor Strasser, which supported the "socialist" wing of the Party and unsuccessfully sought to amend the Party program. It was dissolved in 1926 following the Bamberg Conference.

On 7 March 1926, his Gau expanded by merging with the Gau Westphalia headed by Franz Pfeffer von Salomon. Now renamed Gau Rhine-Ruhr (and still later renamed Großgau Ruhr), it comprised the entire Rhenish-Westphalian industrial area. Again, a sort of triumvirate was established with Kaufmann, Pfeffer von Salomon and Goebbels sharing authority. However, conflicts and disputes among them led to Adolf Hitler resolving the issue in favor of Kaufmann becoming sole Gauleiter on 20 June 1926. Goebbels would go on later that year to become the Gauleiter of Berlin-Brandenburg and Pfeffer von Salomon was soon made Oberster SA-Führer (Supreme SA Leader). Kaufman's tenure was marked by further conflict and upheaval, particularly when his Deputy Gauleiter, Erich Koch, accused him of embezzling Party funds. A Party investigating commission found evidence of irregularities but Kaufmann was not removed from office. On 15 May 1927, he succeeded Goebbels as editor of the Nationalsozialistischen Briefe (National Socialist Letters). In May 1928, Kaufmann was elected to the Landtag of Prussia where he served until October 1930. Then in July 1928, he was made editor of the Nazi weekly newspaper Die Neue Front (The New Front) in Essen. He remained as Gauleiter in the Ruhr until 1 October 1928 when the Gau was subdivided.

On 15 April 1929, he was named Gauleiter of Gau Hamburg, Germany's second largest city and one of the 17 federated states of Germany. He would retain this important post until the end of the Nazi regime in May 1945. In September 1930, he was elected to the Reichstag from electoral constituency 34, (Hamburg), remaining a member until 1945. He was also named as a Reichstag Schriftführer (secretary) and a member of its executive committee.

On 16 May 1933, a few months after the Nazi seizure of power, Kaufmann was named the Reichsstatthalter (Reich Governor) of the State of Hamburg, thus uniting under his control the highest party and governmental offices in his jurisdiction. He commissioned the formation of a “search commando unit” in the Hamburg State Police to suppress Communist and Socialist groups in the city. By September 1933, Kaufmann personally authorized the establishment of the Fuhlsbüttel concentration camp where over 250 persons were eventually murdered. On 15 November 1933, Kaufmann joined the Schutzstaffel (SS) with the rank of SS-Oberführer. He would serve on the honorary SS leadership cadre in the staff of the Reichsführer-SS Heinrich Himmler from 1936 to 1945.

On 30 July 1936, Hitler bestowed the title of Führer der Landesregierung (Leader of the State Government) on Kaufmann, thus granting him more direct authority over the administration of Hamburg at the expense of Carl Vincent Krogmann the titular Governing Mayor of Hamburg. Also in 1936, Kaufmann became the editor of the Hamburger Tageblatt, a Nazi daily newspaper.

On 26 January 1937, the Greater Hamburg Act was passed (effective 1 April) which enlarged Hamburg by the addition of several formerly Prussian cities. During Kristallnacht on the evening of 9–10 November 1938, Kaufmann at a meeting in Munich phoned orders to the Hamburg Nazi Party organization to destroy the synagogues, shops and apartments of Hamburg's Jews.

== Wartime activities ==
At the start of the Second World War on 1 September 1939, Kaufmann was appointed Reich Defense Commissioner for Wehrkreis (military district) X which encompassed his Gau as well as Gau Schleswig-Holstein, and most of Gaue Weser-Ems and Eastern Hanover. After the Allied bombing raid of 15–16 September 1941 resulted in over 600 homeless in Hamburg, Kaufmann petitioned Hitler to allow him to deport local Jews so that he could confiscate their property to re-house bombed-out Germans. Hitler quickly agreed, and the deportations began the following month, in this instance to the Łódź Ghetto in Poland. It is estimated that some 10,000 Hamburg Jews ultimately died during his tenure.

A member of the National Socialist Motor Corps (NSKK), Kaufmann was promoted to NSKK-Obergruppenführer on 20 April 1941. On 30 January 1942, Kaufmann was promoted to SS-Obergruppenführer.

On 30 May 1942, as leader of Germany's largest seaport, Kaufmann was named Reichskommissar (Reich Commissioner) for Overseas Shipping. As such, he shared in the responsibility for supplying overseas elements of Germany's Wehrmacht, such as the Afrika Korps. On 24 August 1942 he was additionally named as Reich Defense Commissioner for the Northern Coast (German Bight). On 16 November 1942, the jurisdiction of the Reich Defense Commissioners was changed from the Wehrkreis to the Gau level, and he retained control only over Gau Hamburg and the German Bight.

The bombing of Hamburg between 24 July and 3 August 1943 ("Operation Gomorrah") resulted in massive material destruction and unprecedented loss of life, estimated at nearly 40,000.

On 20 July 1944, immediately after the failed attempt to assassinate Adolf Hitler, orders were sent out by the plotters for the Army to arrest local Nazi leaders. In most places, however, this did not occur. In Hamburg, Kaufmann and the local army district commander were friends. They sat together and joked about which of them should arrest the other until the situation was clarified.

Like all Gauleiters, on 18 October 1944, Kaufmann was made commander of the Volkssturm in his Gau and began plans to defend the city. However, on 3 April 1945 in a meeting at Hitler's Berlin bunker, Kaufmann expressed doubt about the ability to defend the heavily damaged city and asked Hitler to declare Hamburg an open city. Hitler responded by relieving him as Reich Defense Commissioner for the German Bight. However, on 2 May 1945, Grossadmiral Karl Dönitz who had been appointed Reichspräsident by Hitler before his suicide, agreed to surrender Hamburg without a fight. Accordingly, the military commander in Hamburg, Generalmajor Alwin Wolz, on 3 May surrendered the city to the British army which marched into Hamburg later that day. Kaufmann was arrested and interned on 4 May 1945. On route to being transferred to Nuremberg, he was involved in an auto accident resulting in a severe head injury which required a lengthy hospitalization.

== Post war period ==
Kaufmann was sent to an internment camp. In April 1946, he gave testimony at a British war crimes tribunal investigating the sinking of the SS Cap Arcona which resulted in the deaths of some 7,500 concentration camp inmates. He was eventually sentenced to 14 months' imprisonment for war crimes by a British military court but was released on 22 April 1949 for health reasons relating to his head injury.

Kaufmann subsequently joined the so-called "brotherhood", a right-wing underground organization of former Nazis. He was arrested again on 3 August 1950 but released on 18 November. Undergoing a denazification process, in January 1951 he was classified into Group III (minor offender). He once again became involved in neo-Nazi political activity as a member of the so-called Naumann Circle formed around Werner Naumann, the former State Secretary in the Reich Ministry of Propaganda. This group tried to infiltrate political parties in West Germany. Under surveillance by the British secret service, Kaufmann, Naumann and others were arrested on 15–16 January 1953. On 29 March 1953, Kaufmann was released from the British military hospital in Iserlohn. From 1959 on, he worked as a partner in an insurance company, and later as co-owner of a chemical factory. He lived in Hamburg until his death on 4 December 1969.

== Apologetic account ==
In his book Das letzte Kapitel (The last chapter) published in 1947, Kurt Detlev Möller described Kaufmann as a "good Gauleiter", a "rebel against the leader", and the "rescuer of Hamburg", because of the capitulation without struggle of the city of Hamburg.

== Sources ==
- Höffkes, Karl (1986). Hitlers Politische Generale. Die Gauleiter des Dritten Reiches: ein biographisches Nachschlagewerk. Tübingen: Grabert-Verlag. ISBN 3-87847-163-7.
- Longerich, Peter (2015). Goebbels: A Biography. New York: Random House. ISBN 978-1400067510.
- Miller, Michael D.; Schulz, Andreas (2017). Gauleiter: The Regional Leaders of the Nazi Party and Their Deputies, 1925–1945. Vol. II (Georg Joel – Dr. Bernhard Rust). R. James Bender Publishing. ISBN 978-1-932970-32-6.
- Stubbe-da Luz, Helmut (2005). "Kaufmann, Karl". In Franklin Koplitzsch and Daniel Tilgner (ed.). Hamburg Lexikon (in German) (3 ed.). Ellert&Richter. p. 267. ISBN 3-8319-0179-1.
- Williams, Max (2017). SS Elite: The Senior Leaders of Hitler's Praetorian Guard. Vol. II. Fonthill Media LLC. ISBN 978-1-78155-434-0.
