= Berlin Hohenzollerndamm station =

Railway station in Berlin, Germany

Hohenzollerndamm
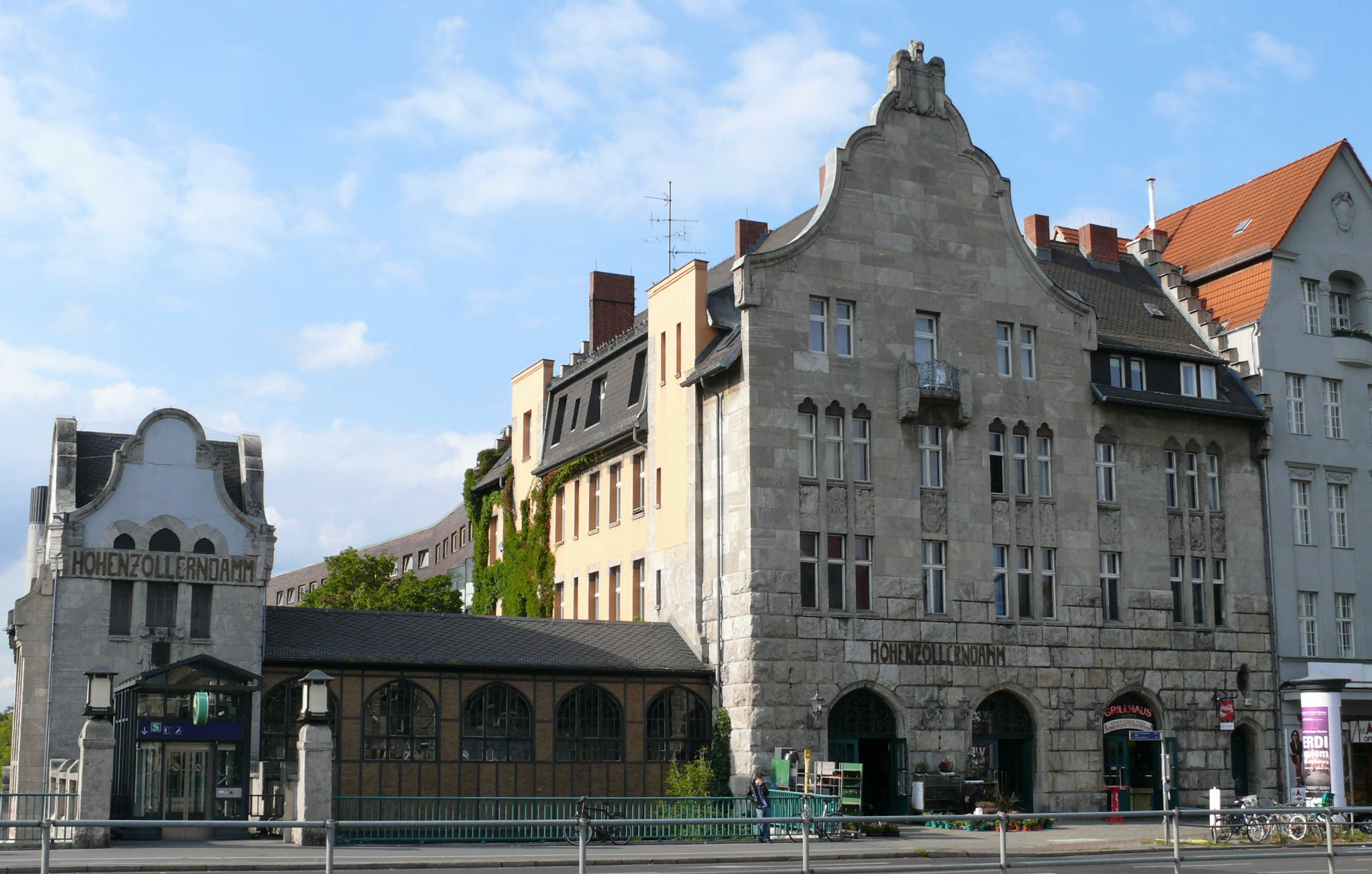

General information
- Location: Hohenzollerndamm; 10713 Berlin; Charlottenburg-Wilmersdorf, Berlin, Berlin; Germany
- Coordinates: 52°29′19″N 13°18′1″E
- Platforms: 1
- Tracks: 4

Construction
- Accessible: Yes

Other information
- Station code: 2866
- DS100 code: BHO
- Category: 4
- Fare zone: VBB: Berlin A/5555
- Website: www.bahnhof.de; sbahn.berlin

Services
Preceding station	Berlin S-Bahn	Following station
Heidelberger Platz One-way operation	S41	Halensee Ringbahn (clockwise)
Heidelberger Platz Ringbahn (counter-clockwise)	S42	Halensee One-way operation
Halensee towards Westend	S46	Heidelberger Platz towards Königs Wusterhausen
Location

Hohenzollerndamm is a station in the Wilmersdorf district of Berlin. It is served by the S-Bahn lines S41, S42 and S46. The station is located on the eponymous street named after the House of Hohenzollern. The neo-baroque entrance hall reminiscent of Art Nouveau design was erected in 1910.

== Location and structure ==
The S-Bahn station is located in the extreme south of the Halensee district under the Hohenzollerndamm bridge. The central platform of the S-Bahn is located below the bridge and is bordered on its northeast by the street of Sesselmannweg and to the northwest by the Ringbahn freight tracks and the Autobahn 100 (inner ring road). Access is from both the entrance building and the bridge via a pedestrian bridge and from there on to the platform.

Additional access building (completed in 2008)

The third access was created in 2008 by the architects Dörr Wimmer PartGmbB (dlw), a direct access from the southeast side of the street of the Hohenzollerndamm bridge. The construction costs amounted to around €500,000.

The entrance building is designed like a residential building in keeping with the surrounding buildings. It was built in the early modernist style with elements of Art Nouveau.

The station is fully accessible. The complex consisting of the station and a residential building is listed on the Berlin state heritage list.

== History ==
The station was built between 1908 and 1910 to serve the new residential areas on Hohenzollerndamm. It was opened on 1 November 1910. Since 6 November 1928, the station has been served by the electric suburban trains, from which the S-Bahn emerged in 1930.

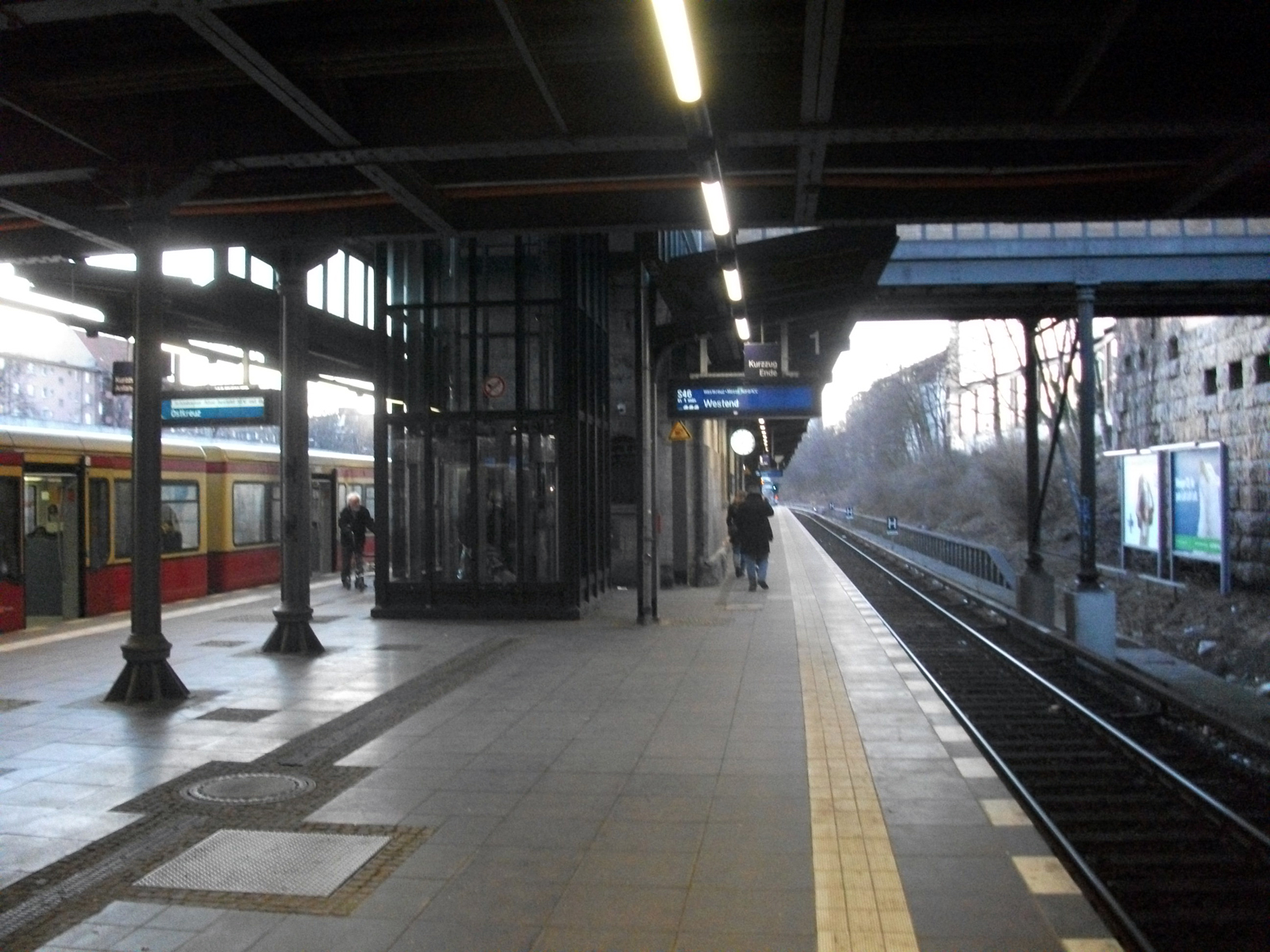
Platform

The S-Bahn station and the Ringbahn were closed due to the S-Bahn strike on 18 September 1980. The Berliner Verkehrsbetriebe then took over the S-Bahn from the Deutsche Reichsbahn in 1984 and began renovating the outdated entrance building in 1988. The repair work on the Ringbahn and the stations took a year, during which the platform at Hohenzollerndamm station was moved under the bridge to the southeast in order to enable further access from the other side of the street. A lift was also installed for disabled access. The southern Ringbahn was put back into operation on 17 December 1993. The new access followed about 15 years later on 19 December 2008.

Since the end of 2015, train dispatch has been carried out by the driver using a driver's cab monitor (ZAT-FM).

== Connections ==
The station is served by Ringbahn lines S41 and S42 as well as the S46 line of the S-Bahn. There is an option to transfer to bus line 115 of the Berliner Verkehrsbetriebe. There was a direct connection to tram line 57 until 1 November 1954.
