= Kurt Detlev Möller =

German archivist and historian (1902–1957)

Kurt Detlev Möller (19 August 1902 – 21 November 1957) was a German archivist and historian. Towards the end of 1947 his reputation was retrieved from respectable obscurity when it became known that he had been a member of the National Socialist Party between 1937 and 1945. Records were unearthed of a lecture he had delivered in 1939 which had included toxic antisemitic remarks. Detlev Möller's problems were compounded when, following public disclosures about his politically tainted past, critics asserted that in his 1947 treatise "Das letzte Kapitel", which dealt with the history of Hamburg during the final months of the Second World War, he was insufficiently critical of the city's Nazi-era Gauleiter, Karl Kaufmann (1900–1969).

== Life ==
Kurt Detlev Möller was born and died in Hamburg. His father was a businessman. He spent his childhood living in Hamburg-Eimsbüttel, a little to the west of the city centre. He embarked on a degree course in History at the University of Hamburg. Four years later he emerged from the Ludwig-Maximilians-Universität München with a doctorate. His dissertation was supervised by Hermann Oncken, and was entitled "Contributions to the history of church and religious life in Hamburg during the early decades of the nineteenth century". (Note: "Beiträge zur Geschichte des kirchlichen und religiösen Lebens in Hamburg in den ersten Jahrzehnten des 19. Jahrhunderts") He returned from Bavaria and undertook an archivists' course in Hamburg before accepting a job as an academic assistant with the Hamburg City Archives Service. He was promoted to the position of Archives Officer ("beamteter Archivrat") in 1934.

In the first part of 1937, he took over the presidency of the Verein für Hamburgische Geschichte in succession to Hans Nirrnheim. It was only in 1948 that confirmation emerged that in 1937 Möller became a member of the ruling National Socialist Party. Under Nirrnheim the "Association for Hamburg History", which had been founded in 1839, had kept itself at a discreet distance from the new regime, but under Möller links to the National Socialists became closer. One of his first acts on taking charge was to organise an exhibition on Family History, which might be thought relatively innocuous, except that a "patron" of the exhibition was the SA Hansa Group ("SA-Gruppe Hansa"). Later in 1937, the merging of various Hamburg borough councils was taken by Möller as an opportunity to present a series of lectures on local history, during the course of which he tried to demonstrate to the politicians that the "Association for Hamburg History" was worthy of official backing. Meanwhile within the association, from 1938 it became known that new Jewish members were no longer to be welcomed. Later that year the Jewish members already in the association were persuaded to resign through an oblique form of communication. Despite already being signed up as members, between ten and fifteen Jewish members were each sent a membership application form on which it was stated that Jews were not able to become members. In the broader context of the institutionalised antisemitism which by this time was part of daily life across Germany, the Jewish members were expected to draw their own conclusions from this and resign their memberships.

War broke out in September 1939 and Möller joined the army. Nirrnheim resumed his responsibilities at the "Association for Hamburg History", though the association appears to have been pretty inactive till 1945. That year Nirrnheim died a couple of days after his eightieth birthday, and Möller returned from the war to Hamburg, resuming his duties both at the Hamburg History Association and as a senior member of the management team at the city archives. In 1948, he was appointed as director (head) of the Hamburg City Archives Service in succession to Heinrich Reincke. He took office on 1 January 1948, but was then sent on leave early in February 1948, facing the prospect of dismissal.

Early in 1948, it became known that Möller had been a member of the National Socialist Party since 1937. A history of Hamburg during the final part of the war, of which lengthy extracts from the pre-publication edition had been appearing in the press for several months, now became controversial. Two things attracted particular criticism: a succession of highly positive comments that Möller included concerning the city's Nazi-era Gauleiter, Karl Kaufmann (1900–1969). The other was a confident assertion that intensive British bombing of Hamburg during 1943 had done nothing to dent civilian morale. This carried uncomfortably close echoes of the speeches transmitted by Joseph Goebbels back in 1943 and was in sharp contrast to the experiences of those made homeless, as well as of friends and relatives of the (estimated) 42,000 people killed in the deadly firestorms through the streets and other destruction generated by those air raids. Further criticism arose over pro-Hitler comments (which at the time had gone largely unremarked, being presumably relatively mainstream) in the longer history of Hamburg that Möller had produced in 1939 to celebrate the centenary of the "Association for Hamburg History". Antisemitic comments included in lectures that Möller had delivered in 1937 resurfaced. In 1949 the city's mayor, Max Brauer, suspended the archivist. In the event the suspension was not permanent, however, since Möller successfully launched a court challenge to the mayor's decision, receiving his directorship of the City Archives Service back in 1951. The post was confirmed five years later on 1 January 1956. However, Kurt Detlev Möller died in Hamburg on 21 November 1957.

== Works ==
- 1933 "Hamburger Männer um Wichern. Ein Bild der religiösen Bewegung vor 100 Jahren", concerning followers of the Home Mission pioneer from Hamburg, Johann Hinrich Wichern
- 1937 Johann Albert Fabricius, biography
- 1939 (with Annelise Tecke) "Bücherkunde zur hamburgischen Geschichte" (Exploring books on Hamburg History)
- 1947 "Das letzte Kapitel", concerning Hamburg during the later war years

At the time of his death Möller was working on a lengthy biography of Caspar Voght. It was never completed.
