= Goebbels: A Biography =

2010 book by Peter Longerich

- First edition (German)
- Author: Peter Longerich
- Original title: Goebbels: Biographie
- Translators: Alan Bance, Jeremy Noakes, Lesley Sharpe
- Language: English
- Genre: Biography
- Published: 2010
- Publisher: Siedler Verlag (Germany); Random House (UK)
- English publication date: 2015
- Media type: Book
- Pages: 964
- ISBN: 978-1-4000-6751-0

Goebbels: A Biography is a 2015 book by Peter Longerich. The book presents an account and analysis of the life of Nazi propaganda minister Joseph Goebbels, with extensive material from his diary, which he kept from 1923 to 1945. It is an English translation of the 2010 German book Goebbels: Biographie by Longerich.

Following its publication, Goebbels' estate sued publisher Random House, because the book quotes excerpts from his diaries without paying royalties to his estate.
