= Verwaltung des ehemaligen Reichsbahnvermögens =

The Verwaltung des ehemaligen Reichsbahnvermögens (VdeR) (Administration of the Former Reichsbahn Assets) was a body created in 1953 by the Occupying Powers of Berlin to take ownership of assets and properties of the East German Deutsche Reichsbahn in the western sectors of Berlin that were not directly related to the operations of the railways in Berlin. These included various storage facilities, buildings, houses, and community gardens. It continued in existence until it transferred its railway assets to the Deutsche Bahn in 1994, after the reunification of Germany.
