= Schmargendorf =

- Quarter of Berlin
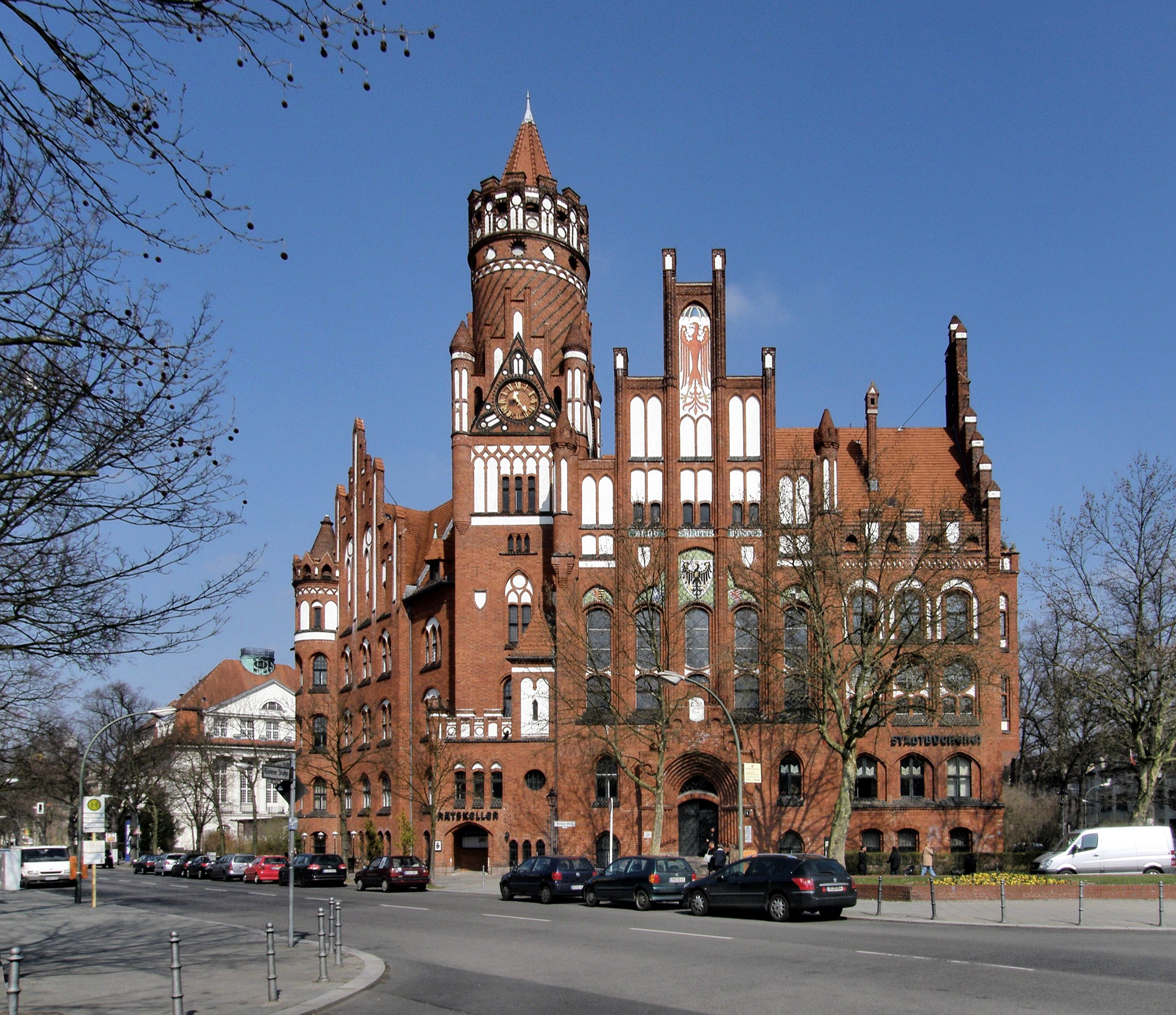
- Schmargendorf Town Hall

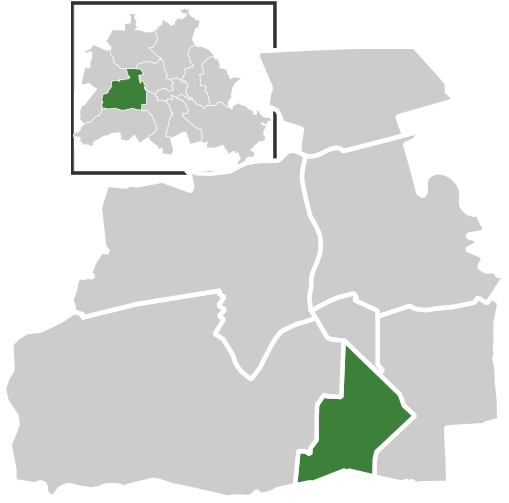
- Location of Schmargendorf in Charlottenburg-Wilmersdorf and Berlin
- Interactive map of Schmargendorf
- Location within Germany Location within Berlin
- Coordinates: 52°28′38″N 13°17′17″E
- Country: Germany
- State: Berlin
- City: Berlin
- Borough: Charlottenburg-Wilmersdorf
- Founded: 1354

Area
  - Total: 3.59 km^{2} (1.39 sq mi)
- Elevation: 45 m (148 ft)

Population (2024-12-31)
  - Total: 24,132
  - Density: 6,720/km^{2} (17,400/sq mi)
- Time zone: UTC+01:00 (CET)
  - Summer (DST): UTC+02:00 (CEST)
- Postal codes: 14193, 14199
- Vehicle registration: B

Schmargendorf (German: [ˈʃmaʁɡn̩ˌdɔʁf]) is a south-western locality (Ortsteil) of Berlin in the district (Bezirk) of Charlottenburg-Wilmersdorf. Until 2001 it was part of the former district of Wilmersdorf.

== Geography ==
Schmargendorf borders with the localities of Grunewald (with Grunewald Forest) in the west, Halensee in the north, Wilmersdorf in the north and east, as well as Dahlem (this one in Steglitz-Zehlendorf borough) in the south. The northeastern border with Berlin's inner city is marked by the Ringbahn line of the Berlin S-Bahn and the Stadtring motorway.

== History ==
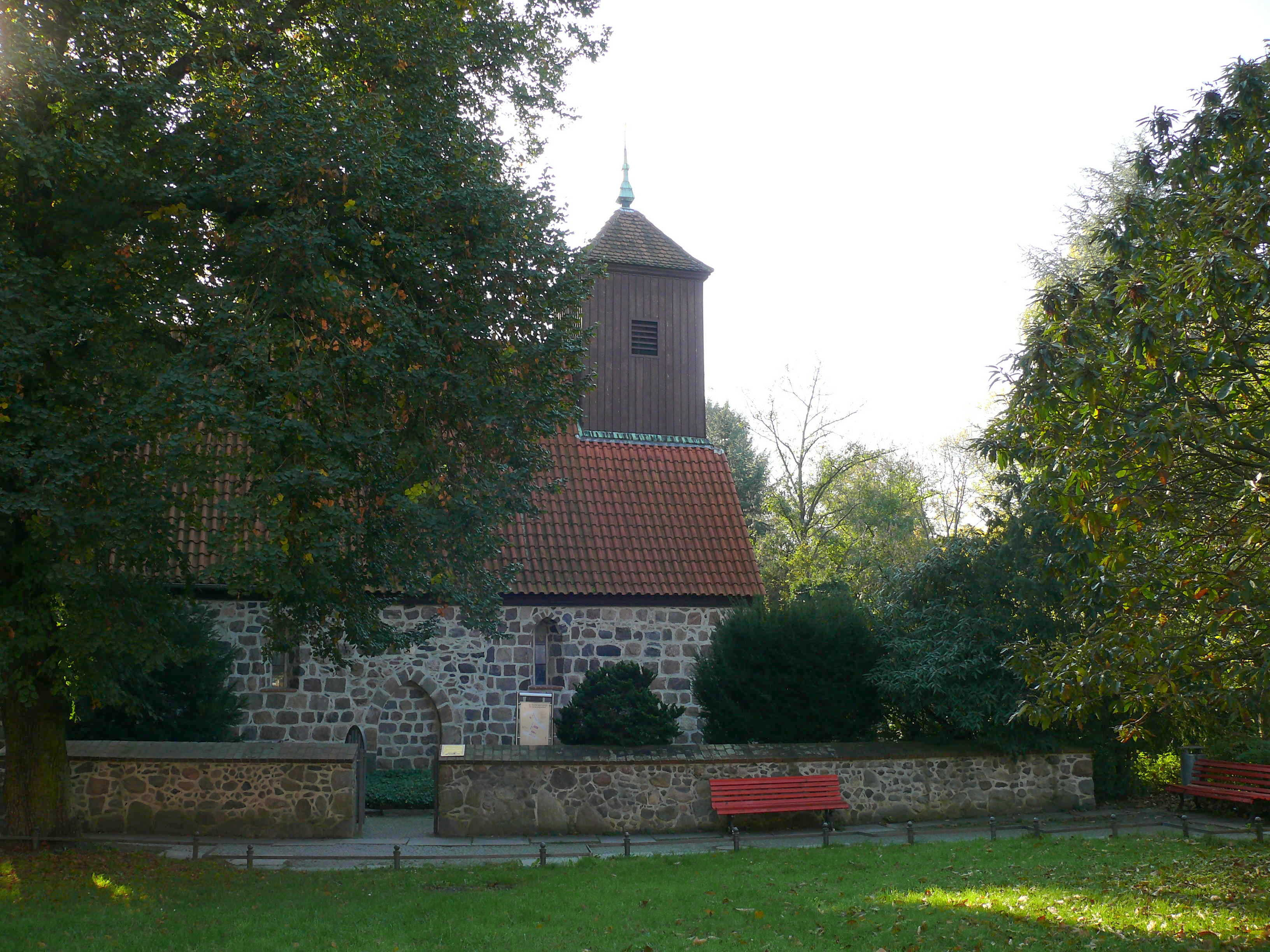
Village church

The village in the Margraviate of Brandenburg was first mentioned as des or ’s Margreven Dorp (literally English: the Margrave's Village) in 1354, contracted to Low German Smargendorp and later adapted to High German standard as Schmargendorf. It was probably established about 1220 by German settlers in the course of the Ostsiedlung under the co-ruling Ascanian Margraves John I and Otto III of Brandenburg, after the former Slavic territories had been conquered by their great-grandfather Albert the Bear.

During the growth of the City of Berlin after the 1871 unification of Germany, many peasants profited by the real estate speculation, when Schmargendorf on the eastern rim of the Grunewald forest became a popular residential area. In 1899 the former village was separated from neighboring Wilmersdorf and received municipal rights within the Brandenburgian Landkreis Teltow, whereafter the residents had the lavish Neo-Gothic town hall erected in 1902. On 1 October 1920 Schmargendorf was incorporated into Berlin by the "Greater Berlin Act".

During the Battle of Berlin in 1945, Schmargendorf became a battleground. Among the force trying to resist there the advancing Soviets were the film producer Ewald von Demandowsky and his lover, the future film star Hildegard Knef, dressed as a soldier.

Since 1954 Schmargendorf houses the Berlinisches Gymnasium zum Grauen Kloster, formerly located in Berlin Mitte.

== Notable residents ==
- Rainer Maria Rilke (1875–1926), poet, from 1898 to 1900 lived in Schmargendorf on Hundekehlestrasse No. 11, together with Lou Andreas-Salomé
- John Heartfield (1891–1968), photographer
- Brigitte Mira (1910–2005), actress
- Heinz Drache (1923–2002), actor
- Lea Rosh (b. 1936), TV journalist
- Cornelia Froboess (b. 1943), actress
- Vladimir Nabokov from 1921-1923, writer

== Transport ==
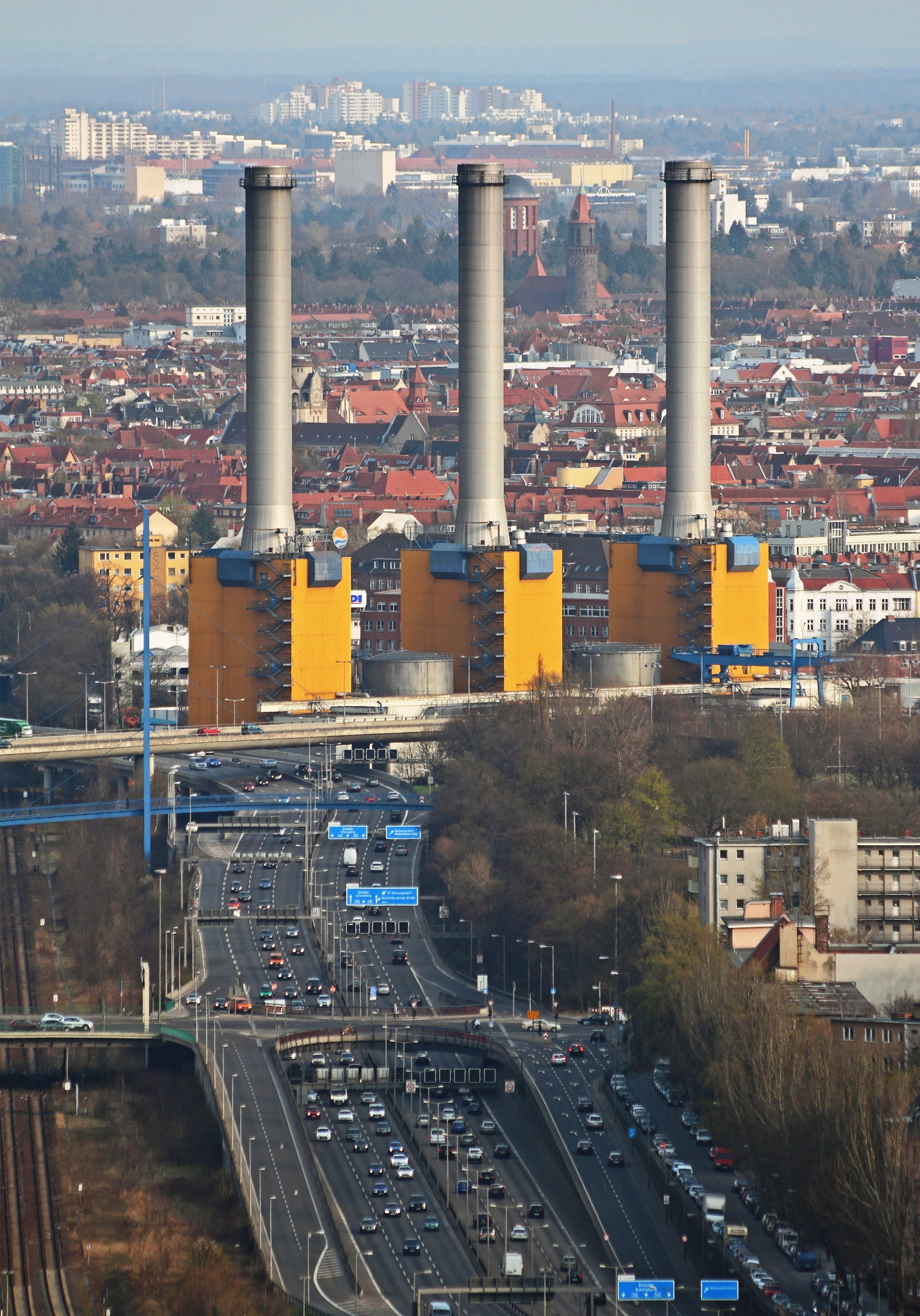
Stadtring and Wilmersdorf power station

At its northern rim Schmargendorf is served by the Ringbahn urban rail stations of Heidelberger Platz (S-Bahn lines : S4 (Ringbahn) + S46; U-Bahn line U3) and Hohenzollerndamm (S-Bahn line S4).

By car it can be reached on the Stadtring motorway (BAB 100), at the Hohenzollerndamm exit (No. 13), and via the Schmargendorf junction (No. 14, former BAB 104) at the exit Mecklenburgische Straße.

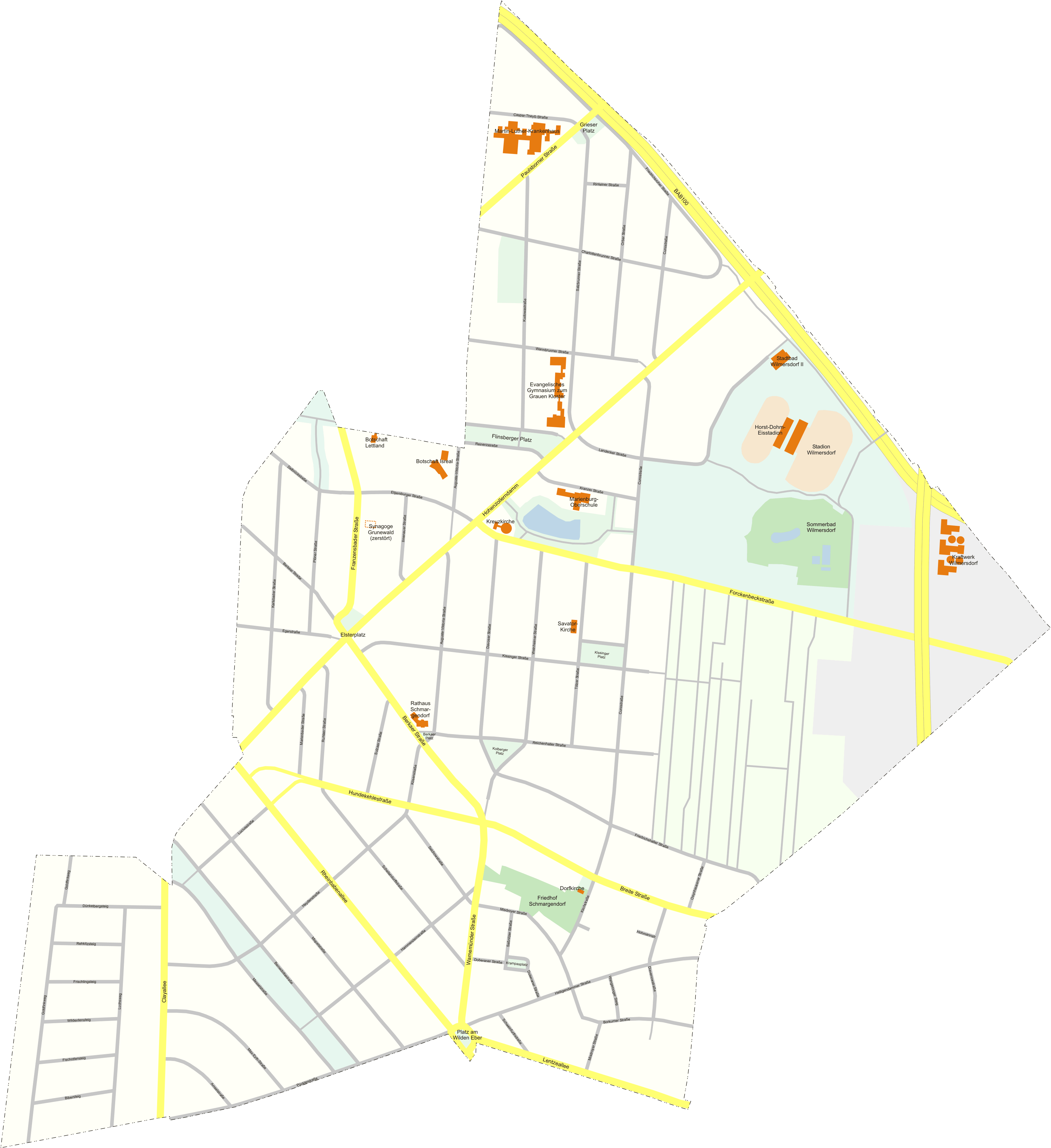
Map of the quarter
