= Schmargendorf Town Hall =

Former town hall in Berlin, Germany

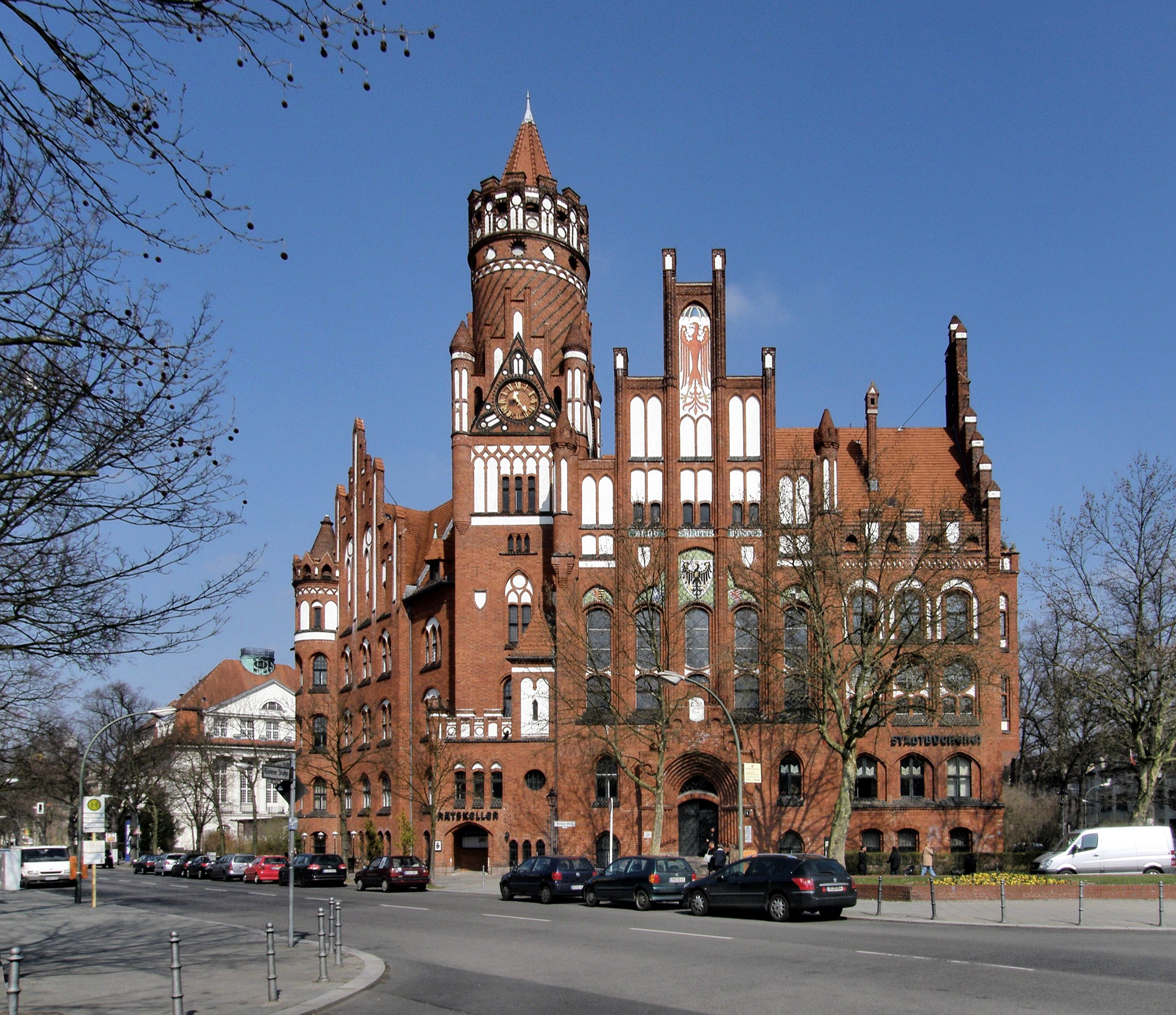
- Schmargendorf Town Hall

General information
- Architectural style: Historicist, Brandenburg brick Gothic, Art Nouveau
- Location: Berlin-Schmargendorf
- Coordinates: 52.4777°N 13.2879°E
- Construction started: 1 June 1900
- Completed: 1 June 1902

Height
- Height: 46 metres (151 ft)

Design and construction
- Architect: Otto Kerwien

The Schmargendorf Town Hall is the former town hall of the once-independent municipality of Schmargendorf, which was incorporated into Berlin in 1920 and has been a district of the Berlin borough of Charlottenburg-Wilmersdorf since 2001. The historicist building was constructed between 1900 and 1902 according to plans by Otto Kerwien in the style of Brandenburg brick Gothic. Kerwien's design was inspired by the mostly medieval secular buildings of Tangermünde and Stendal. Today, it houses the district registry office, the music school, and the Adolf Reichwein Library, a branch of the city library.

== Background ==
By the late 19th century, the farming village of Schmargendorf, on the edge of the Grunewald Forest, had developed into a suburb of Berlin. In 1883, it gained a station on the Ringbahn railway line (Schmargendorf station), and in 1899, the village became an independent administrative district in the Teltow district. At that time, Schmargendorf's municipal council met in a small farmhouse on Breite Straße. In 1900, the decision was made to build a new town hall. Otto Kerwien, an architect from Potsdam who had recently completed the Babelsberg town hall, was commissioned for the project.

== Construction ==
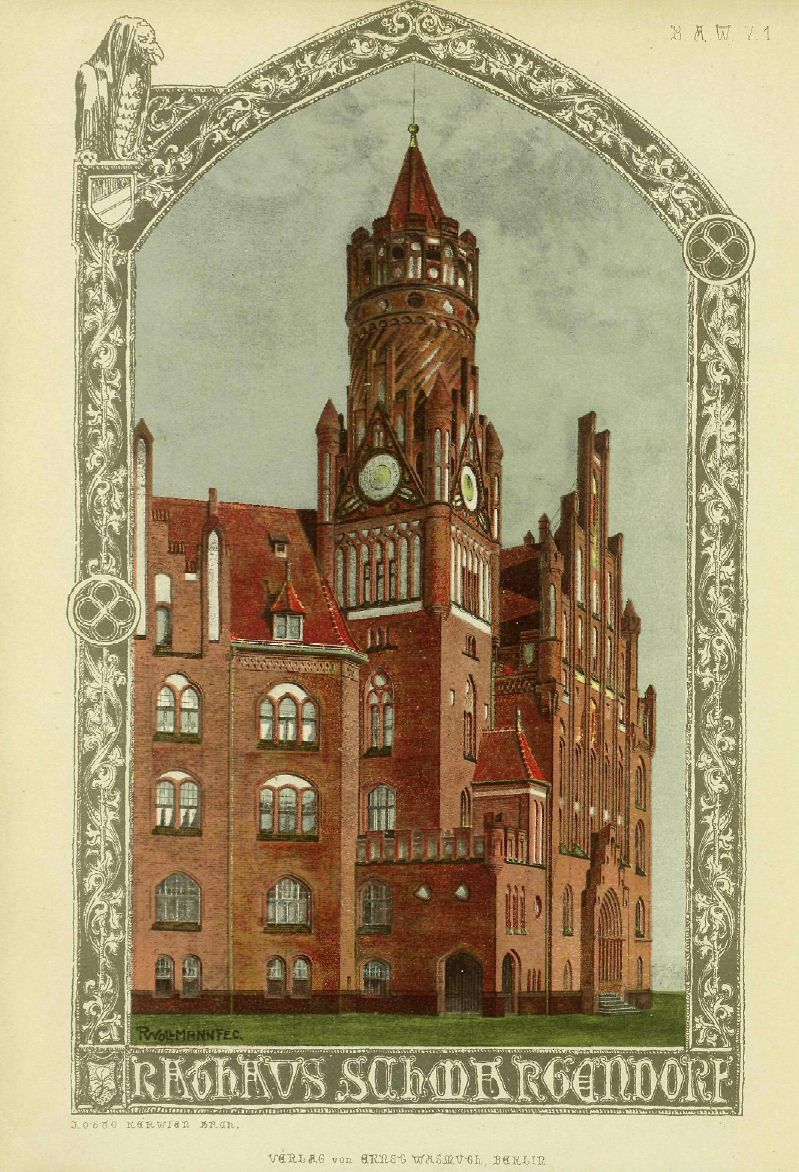
Colour representation of the structural condition in 1902

On 1 June 1900, construction began on the Schmargendorf Town Hall outside the existing settlement area on a plot of land measuring just under 2,000 square metres on Berkaer Platz. The construction costs were estimated at 200,000 marks. Exactly two years later, the new town hall was opened on 1 June 1902. Due to numerous subsequent embellishments and price increases, the building cost 394,000 marks (adjusted for purchasing power in today's currency: approximately 3.24 million euros), nearly double the original estimate.

=== Building structure ===
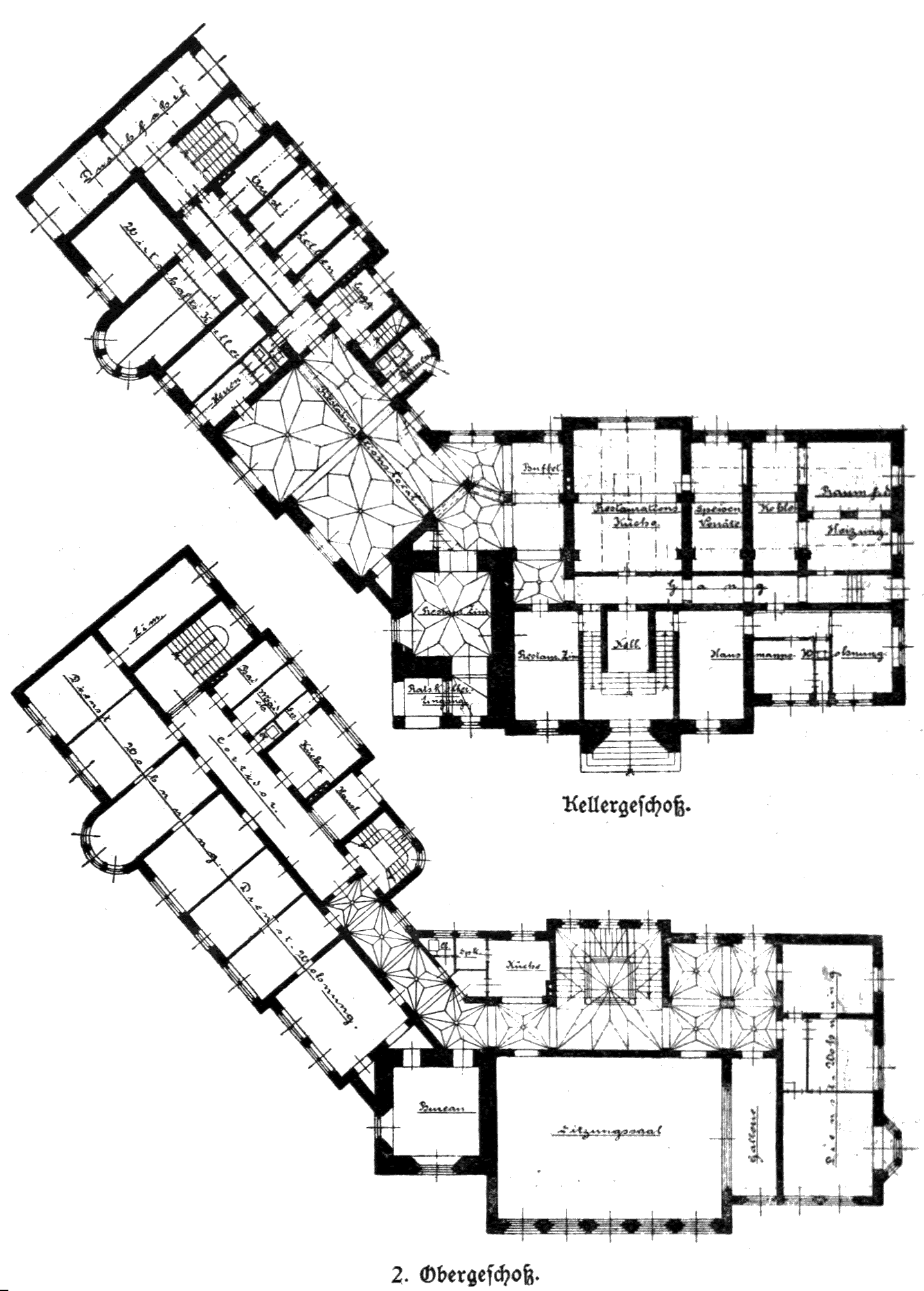
Floor plans of the lower ground floor (‘basement’) and second floor

The building, with a floor area of 840 square metres, consists of two wings that meet at an obtuse angle of approximately 125°. The town hall tower, 46 metres high, serves as a ‘hinge’ between the two wings. The usable area comprises five floors, from the lower ground floor to the attic. The lower ground floor houses the Ratskeller, which has a separate entrance at the corner where the two wings meet, below the tower. Additionally, an apartment for the caretaker and four cells for police detainees were set up in the basement. On the ground floor, adjacent to the vestibule, were rooms for the police, the cash office, tax administration, registration and deregistration, the building office, and a large five-room apartment for a senior administrative officer.

The 108-square-metre council chamber extends over the first and second floors with a height of nine metres, dominating the east wing. On the first floor, there was a small meeting room, an office for the district and municipal administrator, an office for the district and municipal secretary, rooms for the registry office, and a spacious apartment for the municipal administrator. On the second floor, above the small meeting room, was the council chamber's public gallery. The remaining space, like the attic, was converted into apartments for civil servants.

The two-wing buildings are topped by steep gabled roofs with stepped gables. Except for the northwest façade, all façades have windows. The northwest front is closed off by a firewall. Along Berkaer Straße, the town hall could have been extended if necessary.

=== Interior design ===
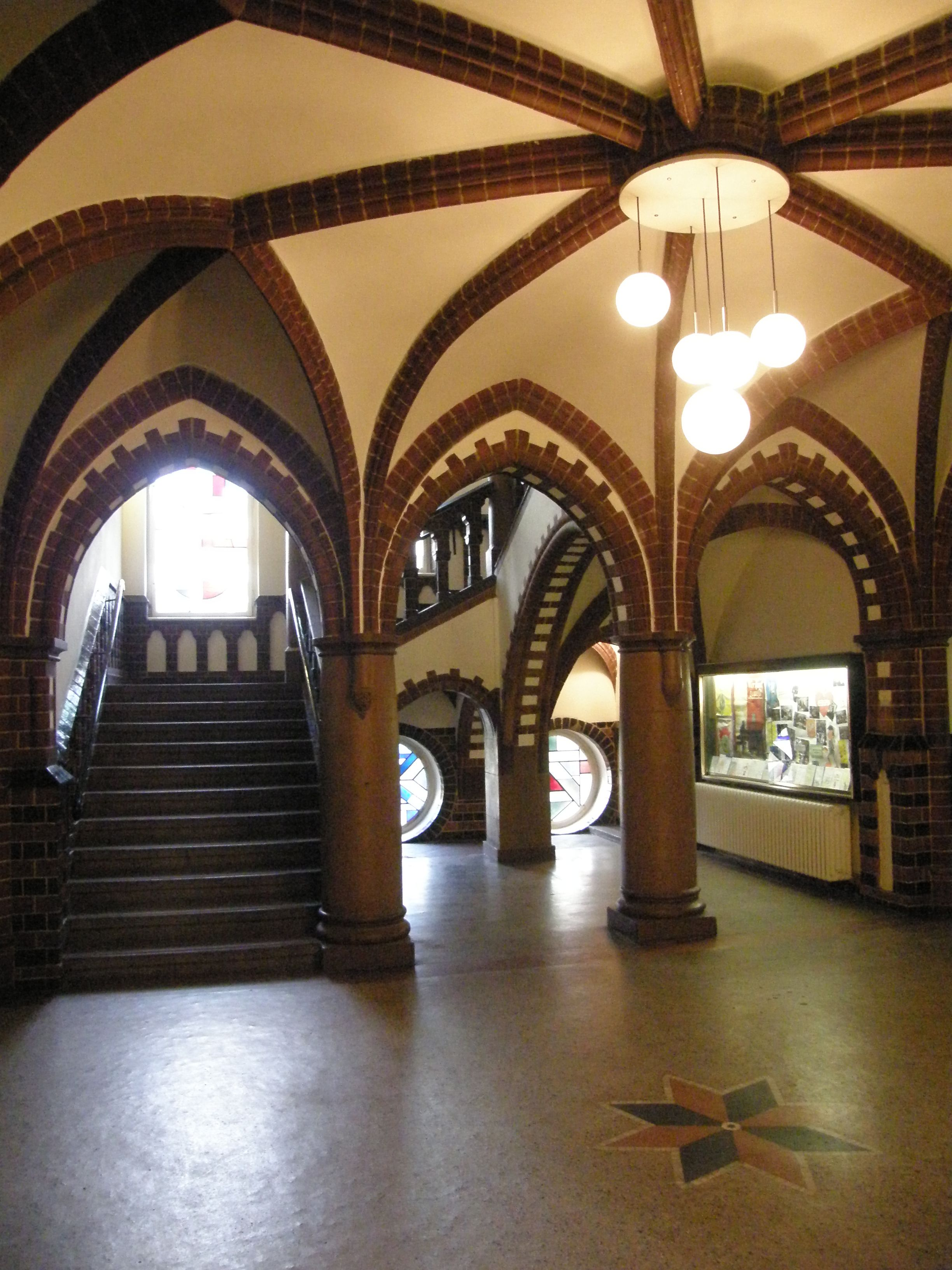
Star vault in the vestibule

All corridors intended for public use, the main staircase, and the Ratskeller were decorated with cross or star vaults. These vaults were constructed using the Rabitz method and solidly bricked, with brick ribs reproduced using original bricks from a monastery in the Mark Brandenburg. The main staircase was constructed with 2.5-metre-wide flights of stairs supported by granite steps. The railings are solidly bricked with openings and clad with coloured glazed bricks.

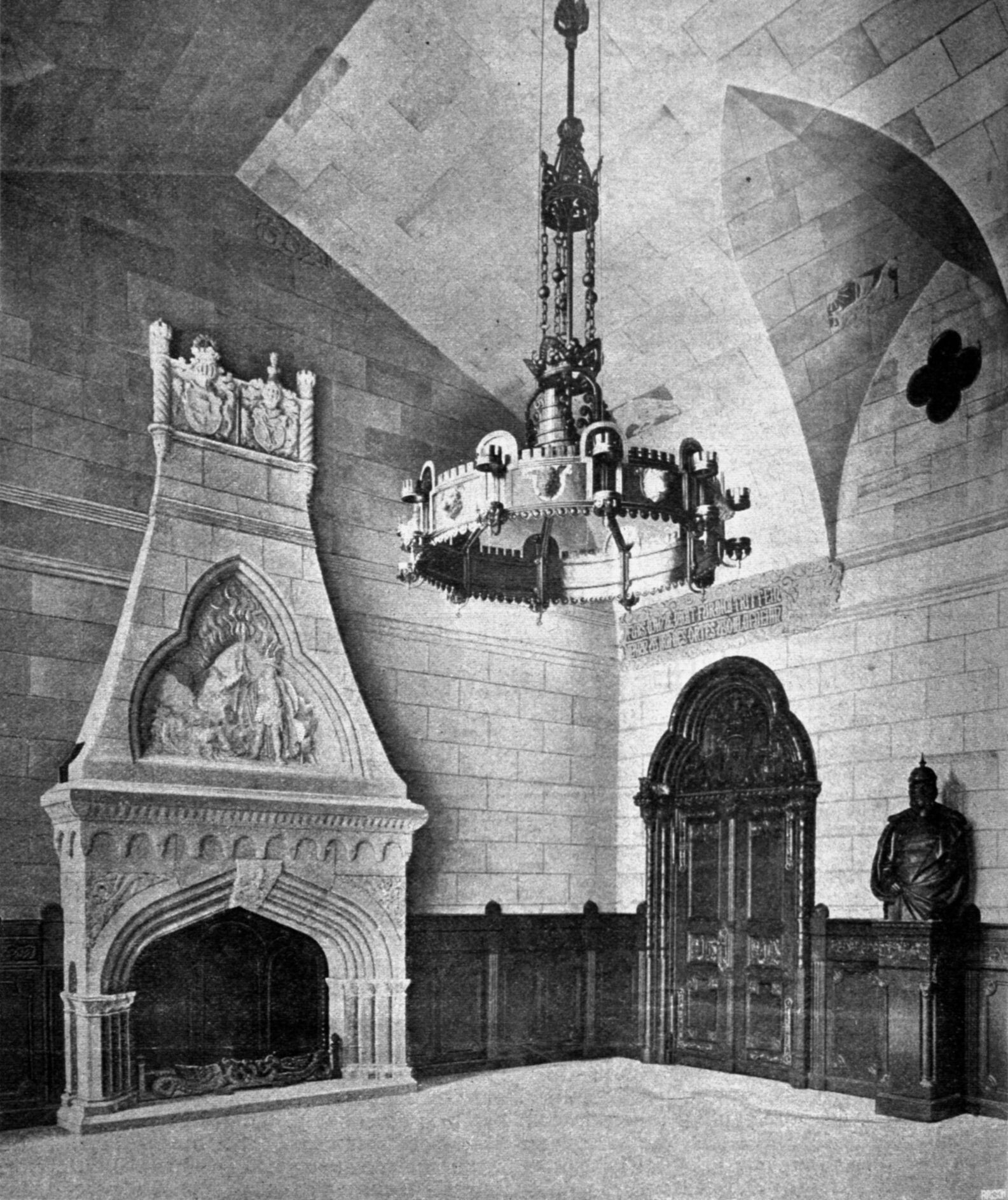
Council chamber with its original 1902 furnishings

The 9 m × 12 m council chamber was particularly ornate. Under the wooden beam ceiling, a Rabitz construction created an imitation vault with the cross-section of a Tudor arch and pointed caps, giving the impression of a vault made entirely of sandstone. Heavy chandeliers, designed by architect Otto Nachtigall, were suspended from the ceiling in two places. The wrought iron light fixtures are riveted with bronze decorations in the shape of wild boar and bear heads, evoking the nearby Grunewald Forest.

The western side of the meeting room was adorned with a large fireplace, which housed the radiators of the former low-pressure steam heating system. Above the fireplace opening is a relief by Charlottenburg sculptor Rudolf Franke, depicting Wotan and Brünhilde performing the fire magic from Die Walküre. The fireplace is crowned by the coats of arms of the Stubenrauch and Eberstein families, from which the former head of the Teltow district originated. The five stained glass windows in the hall displayed coats of arms of noble families from the Teltow district, namely the families von Beyme, von Gerlach, von Schlegel, Graf von Podewils, and von Wilmersdorff. Opposite the window front, on oak pedestals, were three busts, also designed by Franke, of German emperors Wilhelm I, Friedrich III, and Wilhelm II. Carved oak panels covered the walls up to a height of about one metre, and the double doors, richly decorated with carvings, were made of oak to match the pedestals. Above one of the doors, the village church of Schmargendorf is depicted in the arch.

=== Facade ===
The Schmargendorf Town Hall was modelled on medieval late Gothic fortifications in the Altmark region, particularly buildings in Tangermünde and Stendal. At the Uenglinger Tor gate in Stendal's city fortifications, similar tower designs, white-clad gables, slanted clad coat of arms fields, and moulded bricks can be seen.

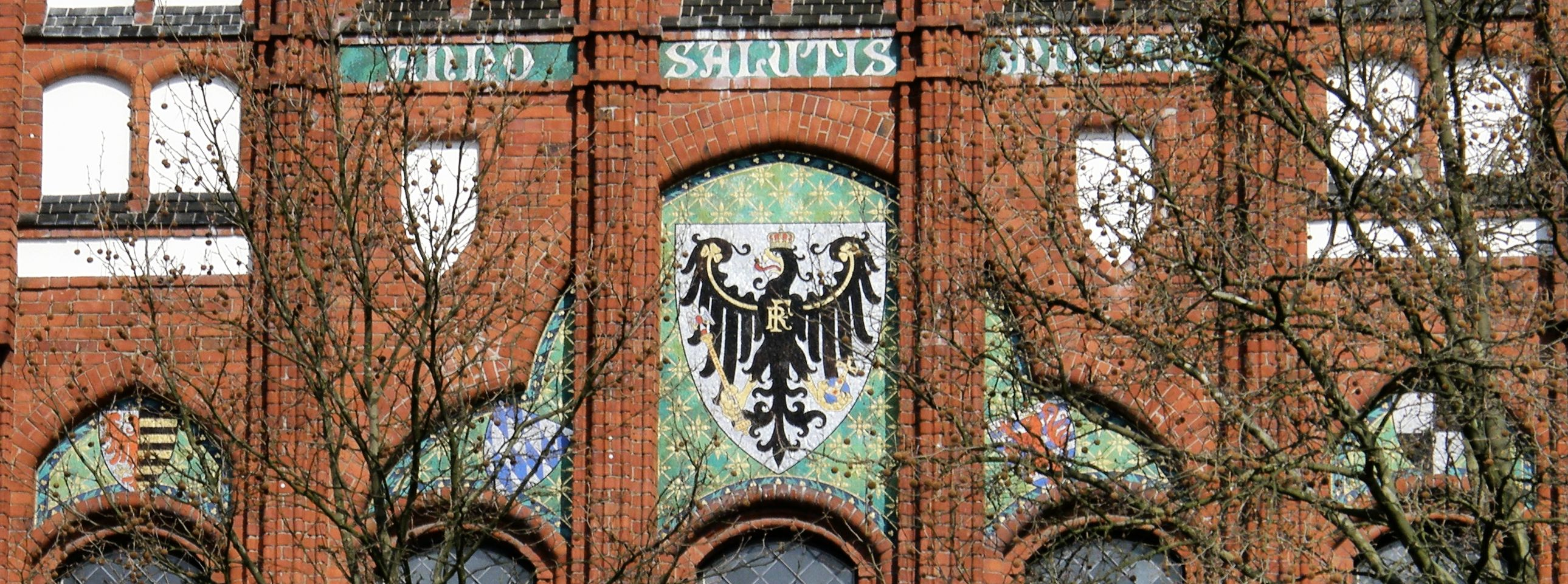
Glass mosaic coat of arms above the windows of the council chamber

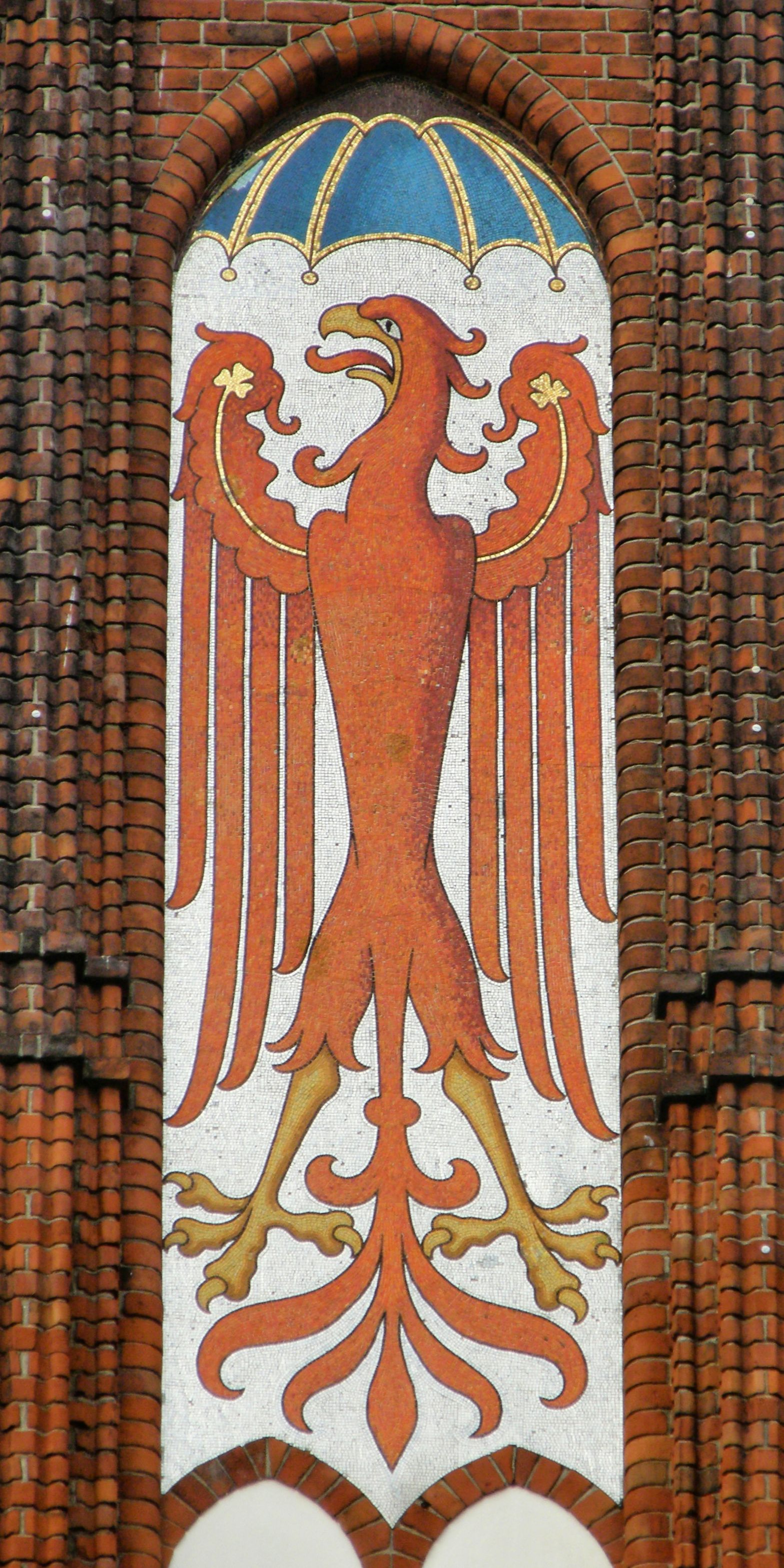
Mosaic of the Märkischer Adler

Kerwien aimed to give the building a ‘picturesque’ appearance, adorning it with numerous gables, towers, and battlements. He added white panels to the red façade and used windows of various sizes and shapes. While the rooms were adequate for the time, the architectural reference to the Middle Ages was "meaningless". The building has a base of porphyry granite. The load-bearing masonry, made of Miltenberg sandstone, was clad with red bricks (‘Rathenow hand-cut bricks’) in monastery format. The main gable on the south façade is richly decorated with glass mosaics by the Rixdorf company Puhl & Wagner.

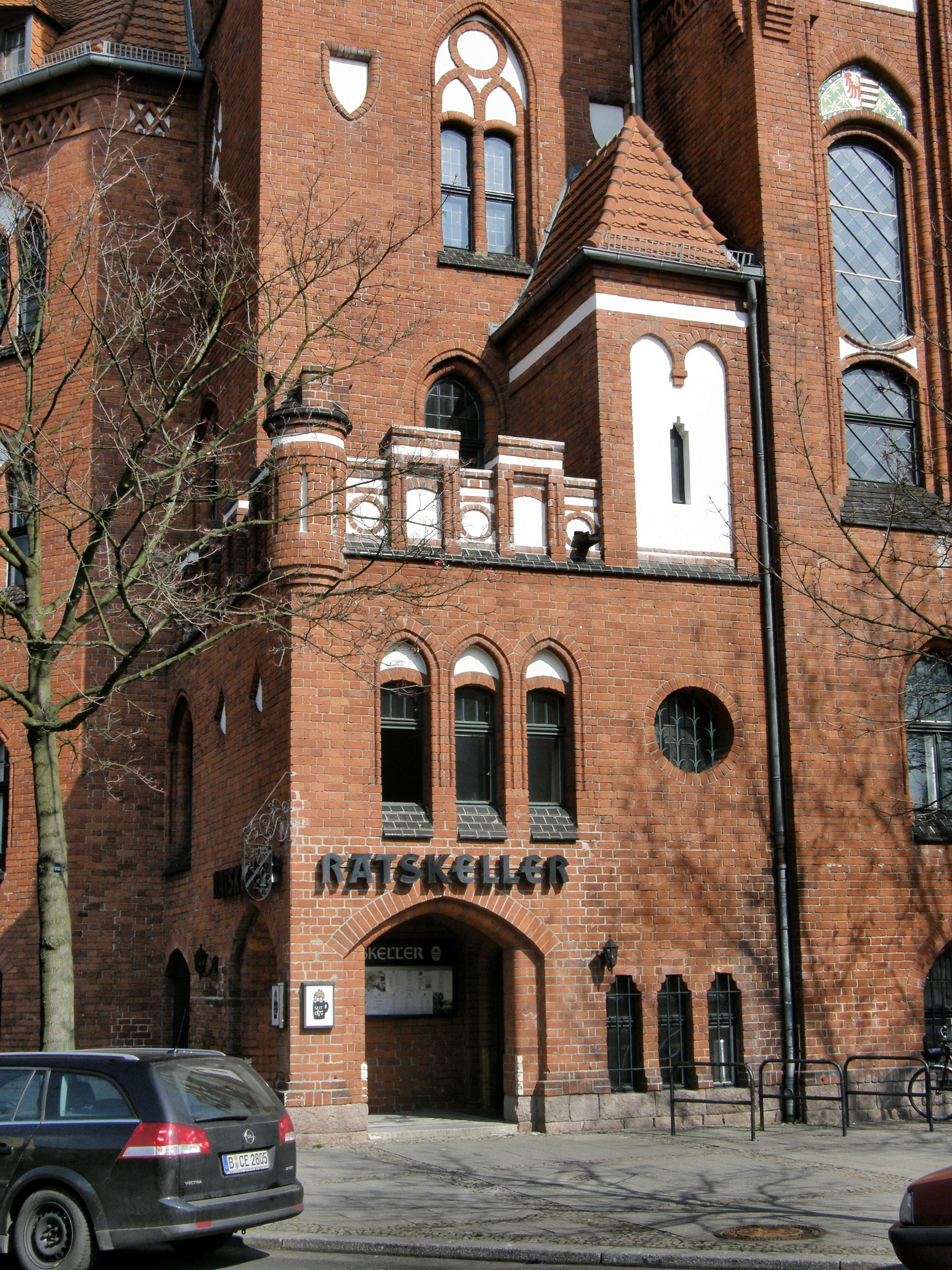
Patio with entrance to the Ratskeller

The main façade, featuring most of the decorative elements, forms the southern front facing Berkaer Platz, where the main entrance is located. The entrance portal protrudes from the southern façade above a short flight of steps. Above the portal is the window front of the council chamber, with five windows crowned by glass mosaics. Above the central window is the large Prussian royal coat of arms, and above the other four windows are the smaller coats of arms of the four Margrave families who once ruled Brandenburg: the Ascanians, Wittelsbachs, Luxembourgs, and Hohenzollerns (from left to right). Above these, a glass mosaic bears the inscription "Anno Salutis MDCCCCI", a reference to medieval models, as this phrase had not been commonly used for about 100 years at the time of construction. The south façade is crowned by an elongated mosaic of the Brandenburg eagle.

The decoration of the remaining façades is limited to panels and architectural ornamentation. Dark green glazed bricks are used, particularly in the tower area. The tower has a square floor plan up to the ridge height of the wing buildings. Above the ridge, a round tower appears to emerge from the square tower, achieved by the spiral arrangement of glazed bricks in the round tower façade. Up to the second floor, the tower is fronted by a loggia, which also forms the entrance to the Ratskeller.

== Conversions ==
Less than 20 years after its inauguration, the town hall lost its original function with the formation of Greater Berlin on 1 October 1920, as Schmargendorf became a district of Wilmersdorf. The district registry office moved into the Schmargendorf Town Hall, and the no-longer-needed council chamber was repurposed as a wedding hall. The spectator stands were dismantled. Due to the town hall's romantic, playful architecture, the registry office became a popular wedding venue.

The building survived the Second World War largely unscathed, though a nearby bomb explosion destroyed most of the glazing. The stained-glass windows of the former council chamber were replaced after the war with simple diamond-shaped glazing.

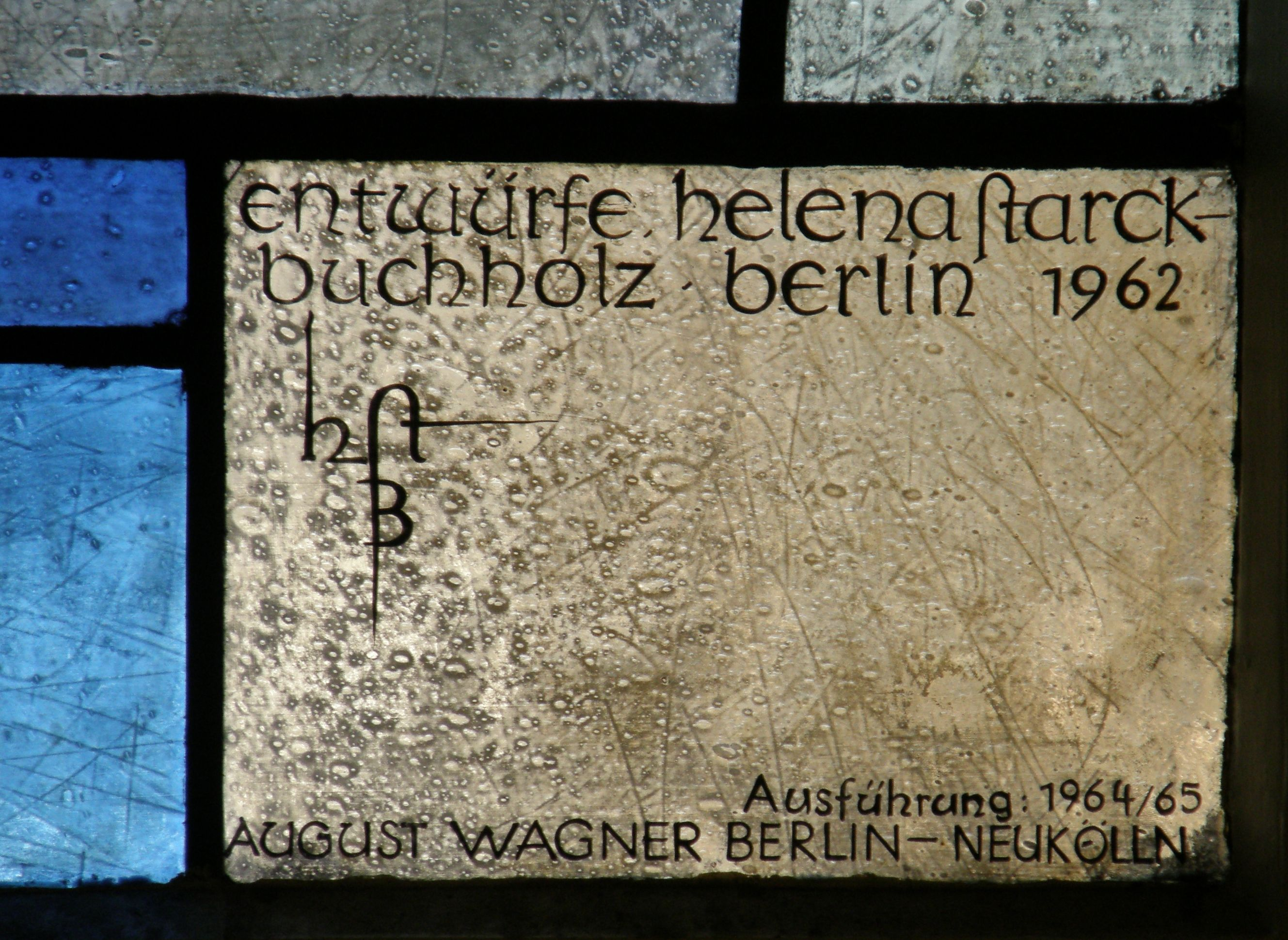
Design and manufacturer's details on one of the windows

Restoration work was carried out in the early 1960s. The façade was cleaned, and war damage was repaired using historical methods, such as whitewashing the panels with soaked lime, a medieval technique. The windows in the main stairwell were also replaced during the restoration. The appearance of the original stained-glass windows was not preserved. The new stained-glass windows, designed between 1962 and 1964 by Wilmersdorf artist Helena Starck-Buchholz, wife of artist Erich Buchholz, were installed in 1964–1965 by August Wagner's company, which had supplied the glass mosaics for the façade 60 years earlier. The main staircase features 14 windows, five of which are circular.

Numerous alterations over the years, necessitated by changing space requirements, have altered the interior appearance. For example, simple corridors in front of staff quarters were connected to public corridors with cross vaults, causing the vaults to end abruptly in present-day corridors. Light fixtures, doors, and partition walls added later often do not align with the original historicist appearance.

== Use ==
=== Registry office ===
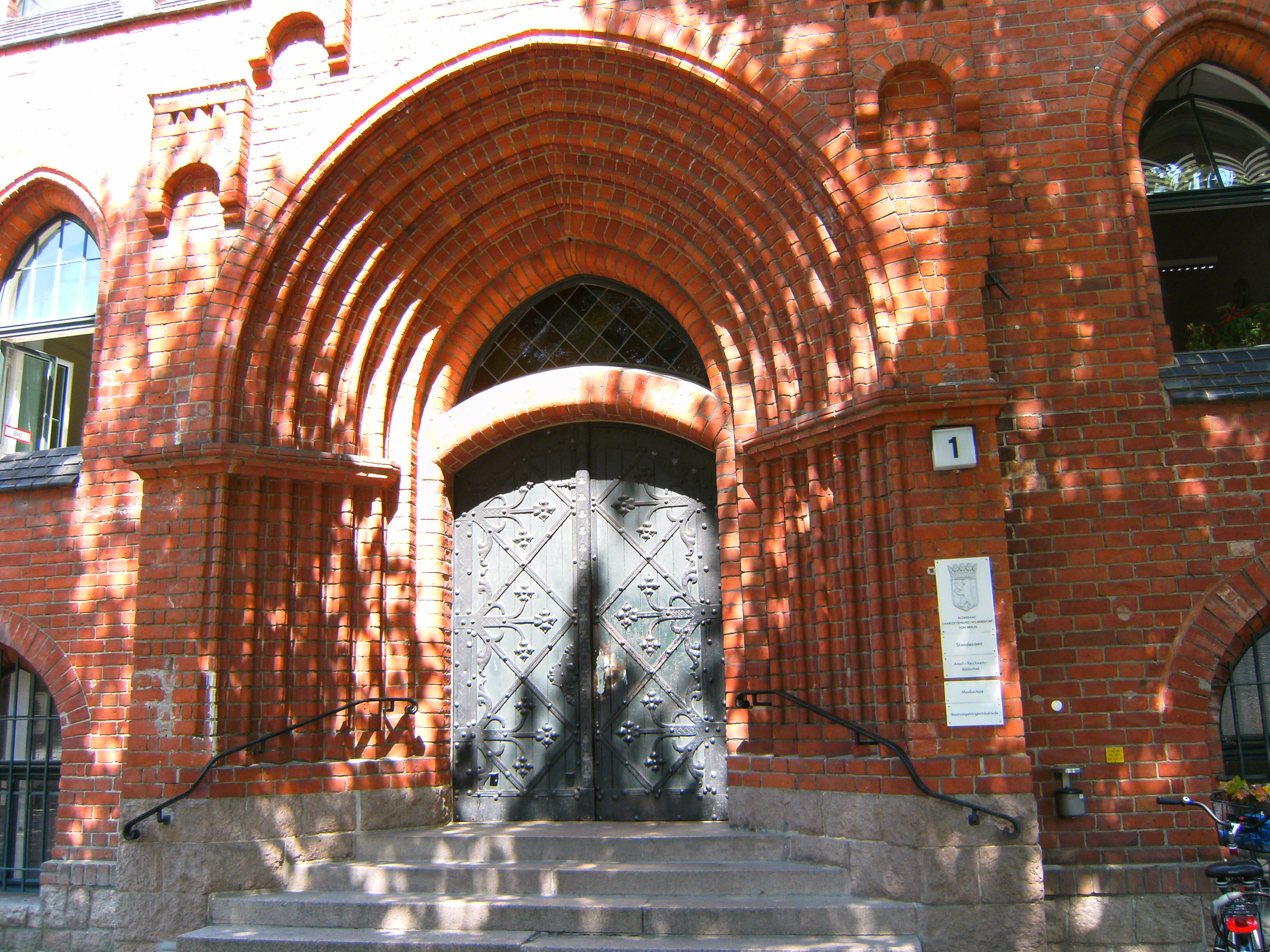
Entrance gate to Schmargendorf Town Hall with information boards about the users

After the district reform in 2001, the registry office, now part of the Charlottenburg-Wilmersdorf district, remained in the Schmargendorf Town Hall. It continues to be popular with wedding couples. Notable figures who married here include director Ernst Lubitsch (1922), physicist Albert Einstein, composer Friedrich Hollaender (1932), actor Curd Jürgens (1937), physicist Manfred von Ardenne (1938), musician Helmut Zacharias (1943), racing driver Bernd Rosemeyer, actress Romy Schneider (1975), actor Erik Ode (1954), boxer Bubi Scholz (1955), actress Anita Kupsch, musician Paul Kuhn, football coach Helmut ‘Fiffi’ Kronsbein, actress Ingrid Steeger, singer Gunter Gabriel, singer Roland Kaiser, singer Susi Dorée (1970), actor Harald Juhnke (8 April 1971), and politician Friedbert Pflüger (22 December 2006).

=== Local library ===
The district library, named after educator and resistance fighter Adolf Reichwein, is also located in the town hall. The adult section occupies the former police rooms on the ground floor, while the youth section is on the second floor. Both departments moved into the vacant premises of the former Ratskeller in 2019. A bust of Adolf Reichwein, created by Knud Knudsen, stands in the vestibule in his memory. The library was established in 1952 by Hertha Block, who was active in the Federation of Proletarian Revolutionary Writers and had been imprisoned in the SA prison on Papestraße. In her memory, the Hertha Block Promenade of the East-West Green Belt, opened in 2012, was named after her.

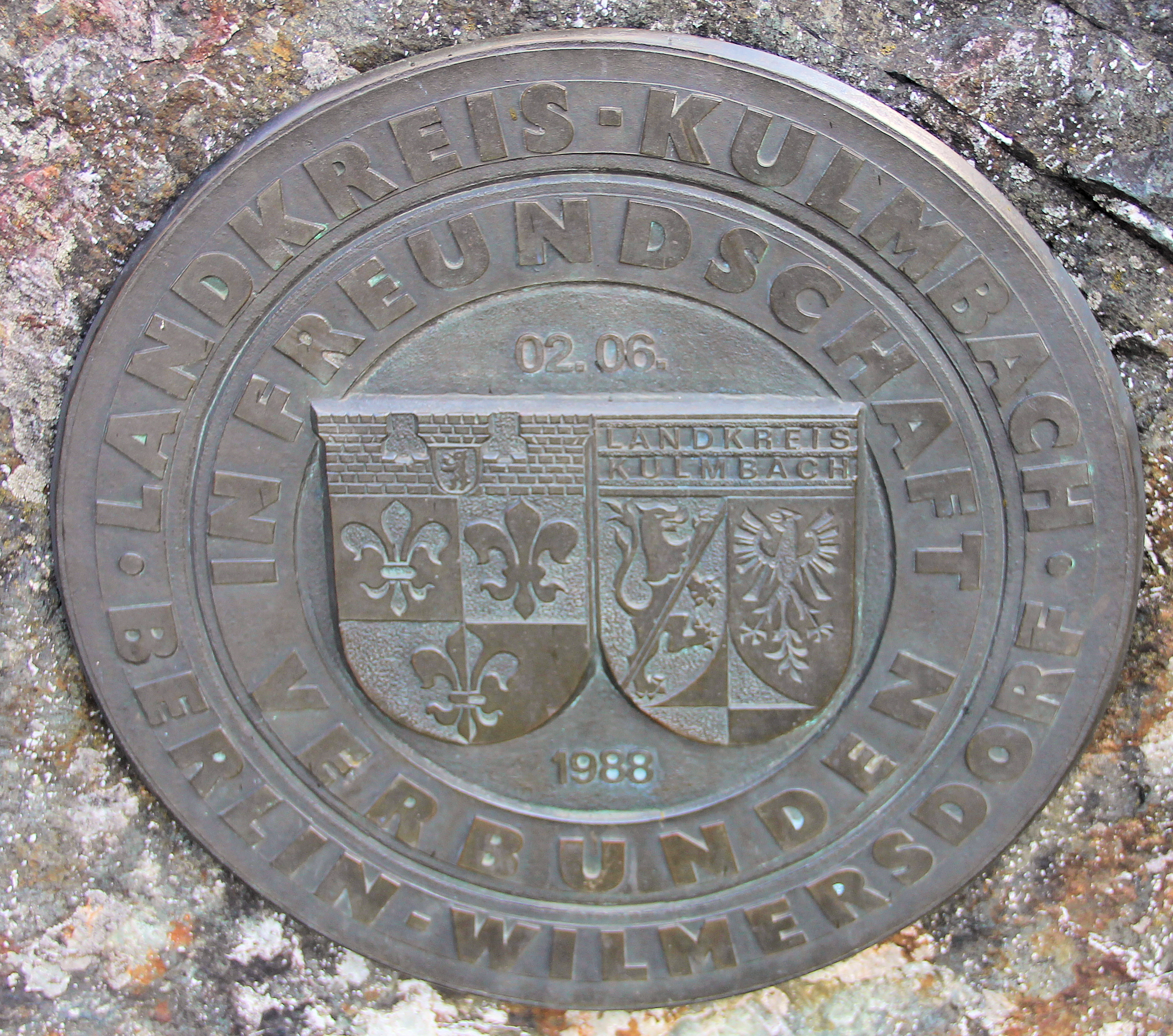
Commemorative plaque marking the partnership between Charlottenburg-Wilmersdorf and Kulmbach
