= Rüdesheimer Platz station =

Station of the Berlin U-Bahn

Coordinates: 52°28′24″N 13°18′52″E

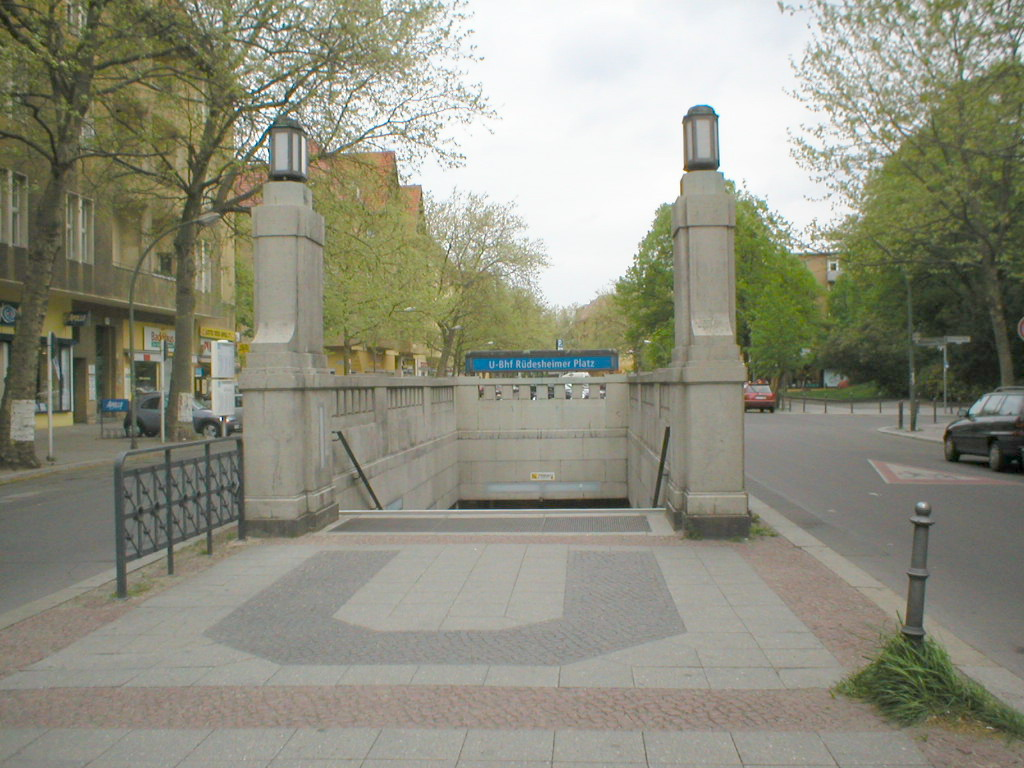
Entrance

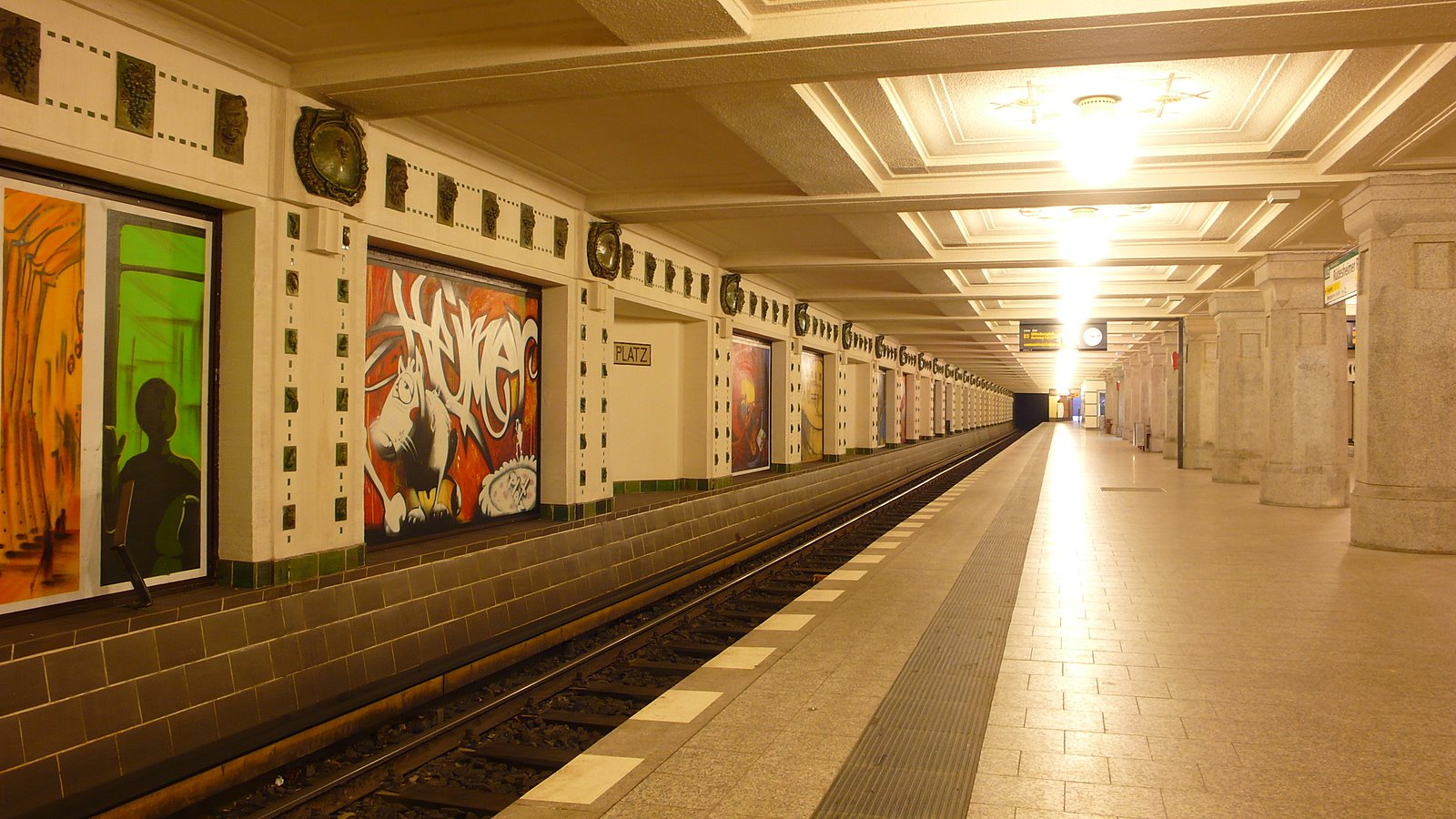
Platform view

Rüdesheimer Platz is a Berlin U-Bahn station located on the U3 line in the Wilmersdorf district.

The station opened on 12 October 1913. The eponymous square was named after the town of Rüdesheim am Rhein in Hesse, famous for its Rheingau wines. Wilhelm Leitgebel constructed it in a similar ornate fashion to the nearby stations at Heidelberger Platz and Breitenbachplatz. Mosaics, many artistic details and granite columns can be found there. It was closed for a few months during World War II, reopened in 1945 and was renovated in 1988. Since then, murals have been displayed on the station walls. In 2005, the platform of the station was renovated again, with new coloring and flooring.

Preceding station	Berlin U-Bahn	Following station
Breitenbachplatz towards Krumme Lanke	U3	Heidelberger Platz towards Warschauer Straße
