= Breitenbachplatz station =

Station of the Berlin U-Bahn

Coordinates: 52°28′01″N 13°18′31″E

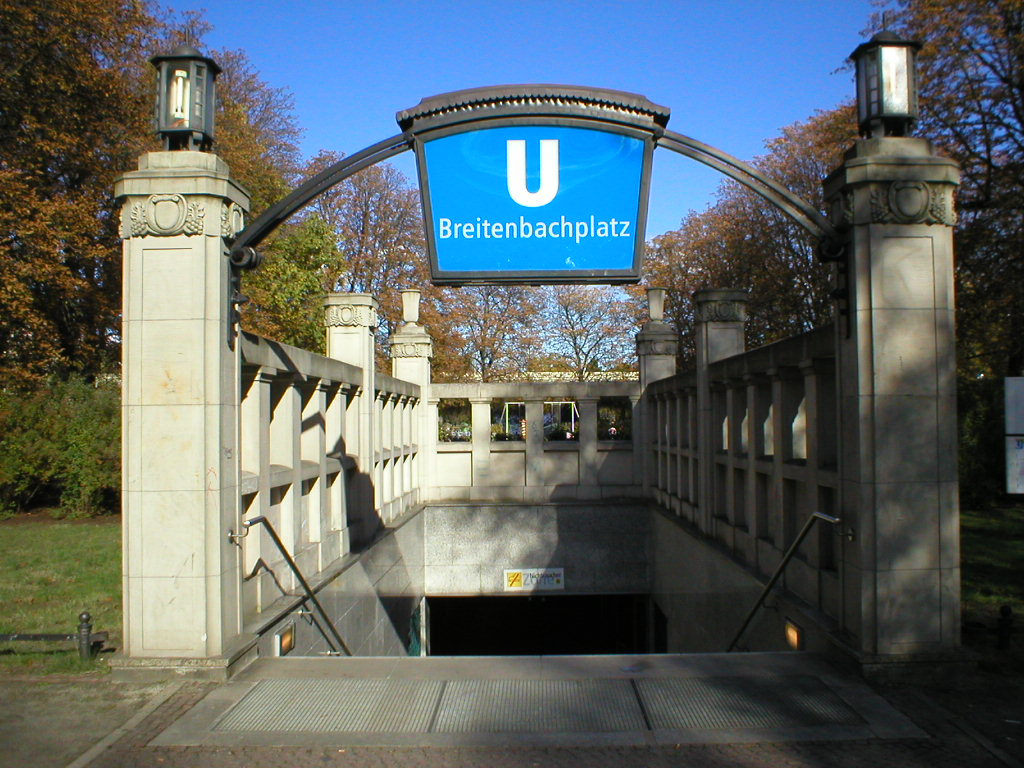
Entrance

Breitenbachplatz is a Berlin U-Bahn station located in the Dahlem district on the U3.

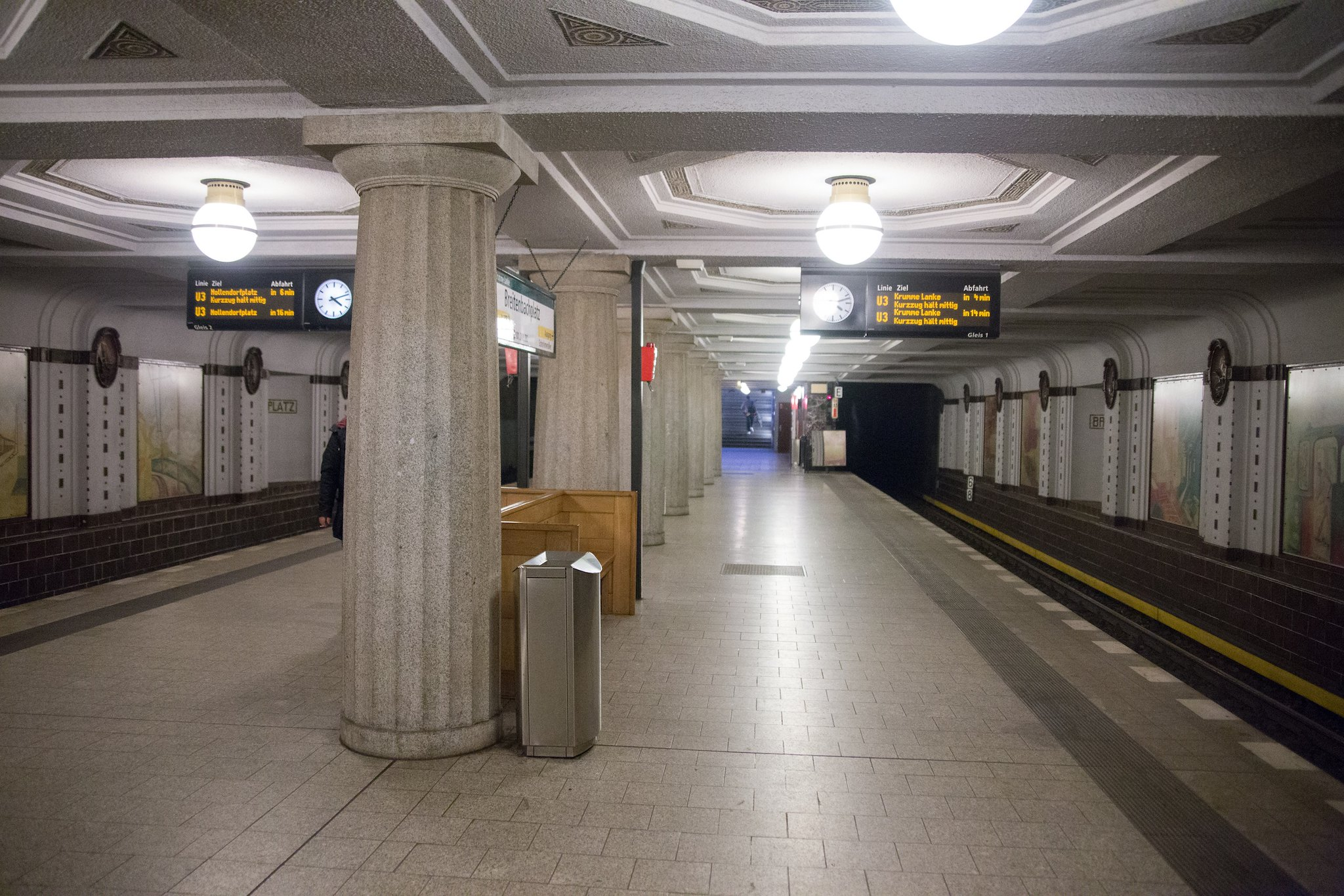
Platform of the station

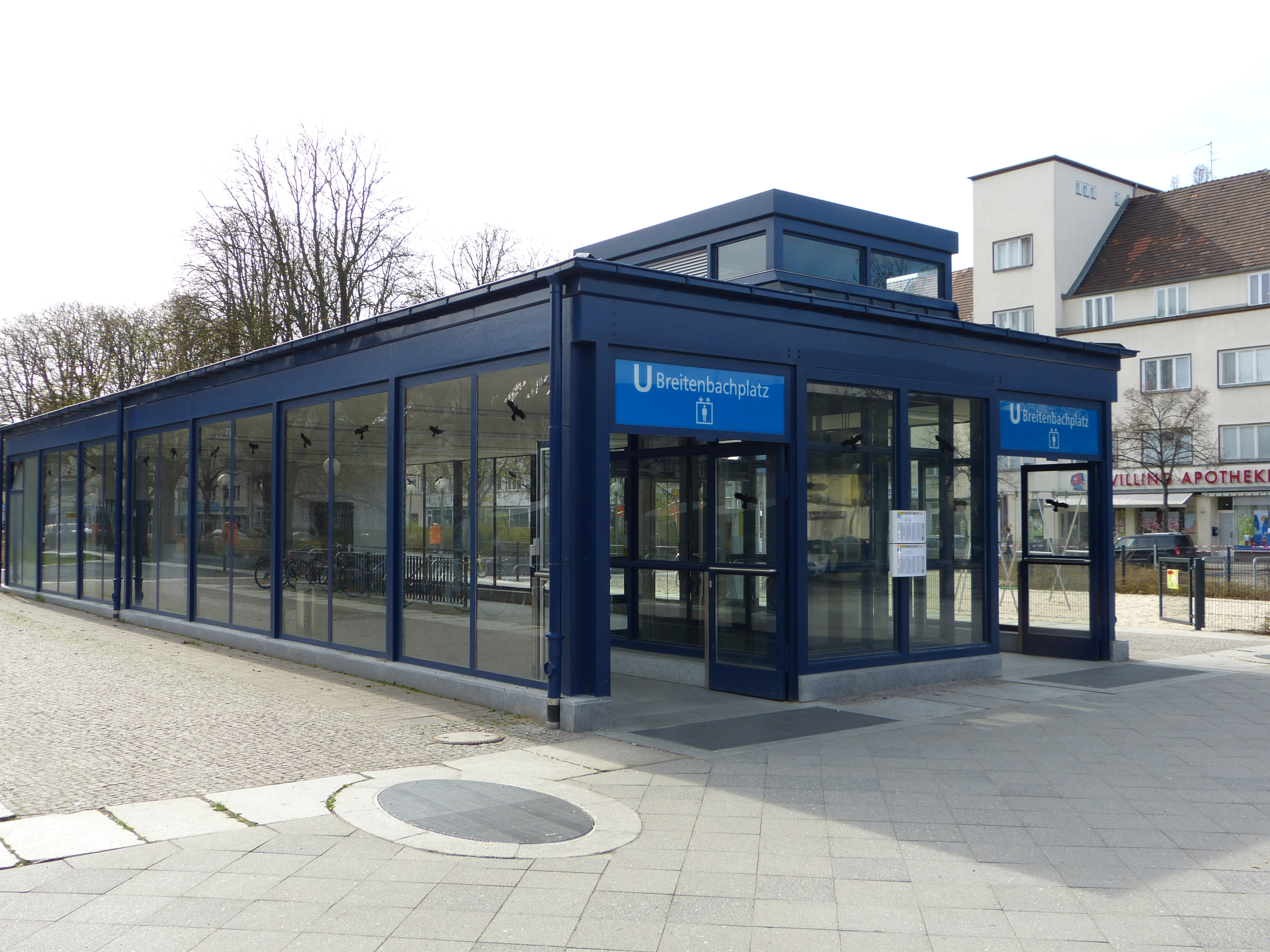
Entrance with lift

It opened on 12 October 1913. The station, and the eponymous square, were named after Minister of State Paul von Breitenbach. It was constructed by German architect Wilhelm Leitgebel and closed for a few months during 1945 because of the Second World War. In 2011, the station was renovated to include a new floor and a lift.

The underground station Breitenbachplatz is a Berlin underground station of the underground line U3 under the Breitenbachplatz in the district Dahlem on the border to the districts Steglitz (both in the district Steglitz-Zehlendorf) and Wilmersdorf in the district Charlottenburg-Wilmersdorf. The station was like the other stations of the Wilmersdorf-Dahlemer-Schnellbahn on October 12, 1913 in operation. Simultaneously with the construction of the station, the aboveground space was created. Originally named Rastatter Platz, this oval was renamed 'Breitenbachplatz' when the subway station below the square was opened.

The subway station Breitenbachplatz was built as part of the construction of the Wilmersdorf-Dahlemer subway between Wittenbergplatz and Thielplatz in the south of the Dahlem domain. Just like the very similarly designed Rüdesheimer Platz station and the Heidelberger Platz underground station, the Breitenbachplatz underground station was designed by the architect Wilhelm Leitgebel.

For the two original entrances to the north and south, Leitgebel designed similar to the Rüdesheimer Platz stone pylons with lamp attachment and a Steinumwehrung. For the metal entrance gates, Leitgebel chose Andrea crosses and flower medallions as design features. The mid-rise to the extended Schildhornstraße was already planned in 1909, but was not completed until 1979. This opens into an above-ground stone-glass pavilion.

The platform hall is designed as a central platform. The walls are divided into a red-brown ceramic base, a bright wall with semicircular niches and a dark brown fireplace cornice as a conclusion. In the niches nameplates and paintings of Joachim Szymczak alternate, since 1988 instead of advertising signs the 150-year existence of the Prussian railway and the eponymous Prussian Minister of Public Works, Paul von Breitenbach, thematize. On the pillars between the niches are representations of animals, plants and scientific instruments as an indication of the originally nearby institutes of the Kaiser Wilhelm Society in Dahlem.

The hall ceiling is designed as a coffered ceiling supported by granite-faced Doric pillars in the center of the platform. The cassettes contain octagonal mosaic panels with geometric patterns. Through four elliptical openings daylight falls on the today with granite, originally occupied with asphalt plates platform.

During the Second World War, the station remained largely intact. Only the northern access area was damaged and partially rebuilt only simplified. From the original equipment, three wooden double benches and in the southern entrance area, the former switch house, can still be found. The station is a listed building.

The underground station is barrier-free. The equipment with a lift was put into operation on 7 October 2010; the construction costs amounted to 340,000 euros. A guidance system is also available.

== Notes ==
Preceding station	Berlin U-Bahn	Following station
Podbielskiallee towards Krumme Lanke	U3	Rüdesheimer Platz towards Warschauer Straße
