= Wilhelm Leitgebel =

German architect

Wilhelm Leitgebel was a German architect who is celebrated for his designs of five Berlin U-Bahn (or, underground railway) stations. Leitgebel is perhaps best known for his work on the Heidelberger Platz station in Berlin, completed in November 1913. Leitgebel also worked with Alfred Grenander on Nürnberger Platz.

== U-Bahn stations ==
- Breitenbachplatz
- Fehrbelliner Platz
- Heidelberger Platz
- Hohenzollernplatz
- Rüdesheimer Platz
