= Dahlem, Berlin =

Dahlem
- Quarter of Berlin
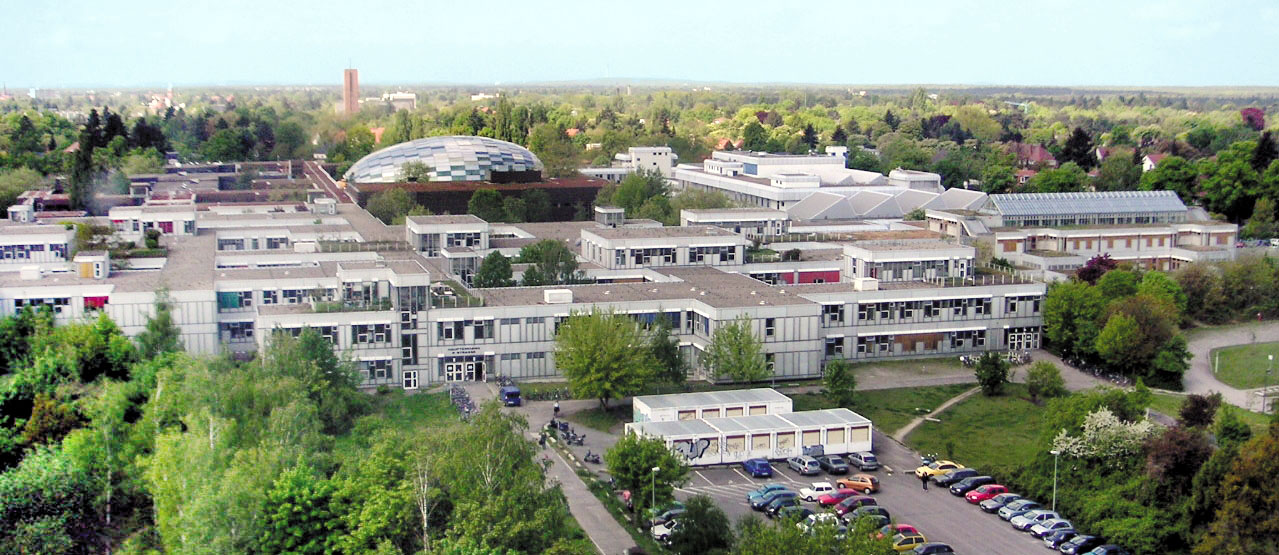
- "Rost- and Silberlaube" complex of the FU Berlin

- Location of Dahlem in Steglitz-Zehlendorf and Berlin
- Interactive map of Dahlem
- Location within Germany Location within Berlin
- Coordinates: 52°27′29″N 13°17′15″E
- Country: Germany
- State: Berlin
- City: Berlin
- Borough: Steglitz-Zehlendorf
- Founded: 1275

Area
  - Total: 8.39 km^{2} (3.24 sq mi)
- Elevation: 50 m (160 ft)

Population (2024-12-31)
  - Total: 16,726
  - Density: 1,990/km^{2} (5,160/sq mi)
- Time zone: UTC+01:00 (CET)
  - Summer (DST): UTC+02:00 (CEST)
- Postal codes: 12203, 14169, 14195
- Vehicle registration: B

Dahlem (German: [ˈdaːlɛm] or [ˈdaːləm]) is a locality of the Steglitz-Zehlendorf borough in southwestern Berlin. Until Berlin's 2001 administrative reform it was a part of the former borough of Zehlendorf. It is located between the mansion settlements of Grunewald and Lichterfelde West.

Dahlem is one of the most affluent parts of the city and a center for academic research. It is home to the Freie Universität Berlin, with its architecturally significant Philological Library ("The Brain"). Several other research institutions and museums, as well as parts of the Grunewald forest with its renaissance hunting lodge, are located in Dahlem.

The U3 line of the Berlin U-Bahn system connects Dahlem to central Berlin.

== History ==
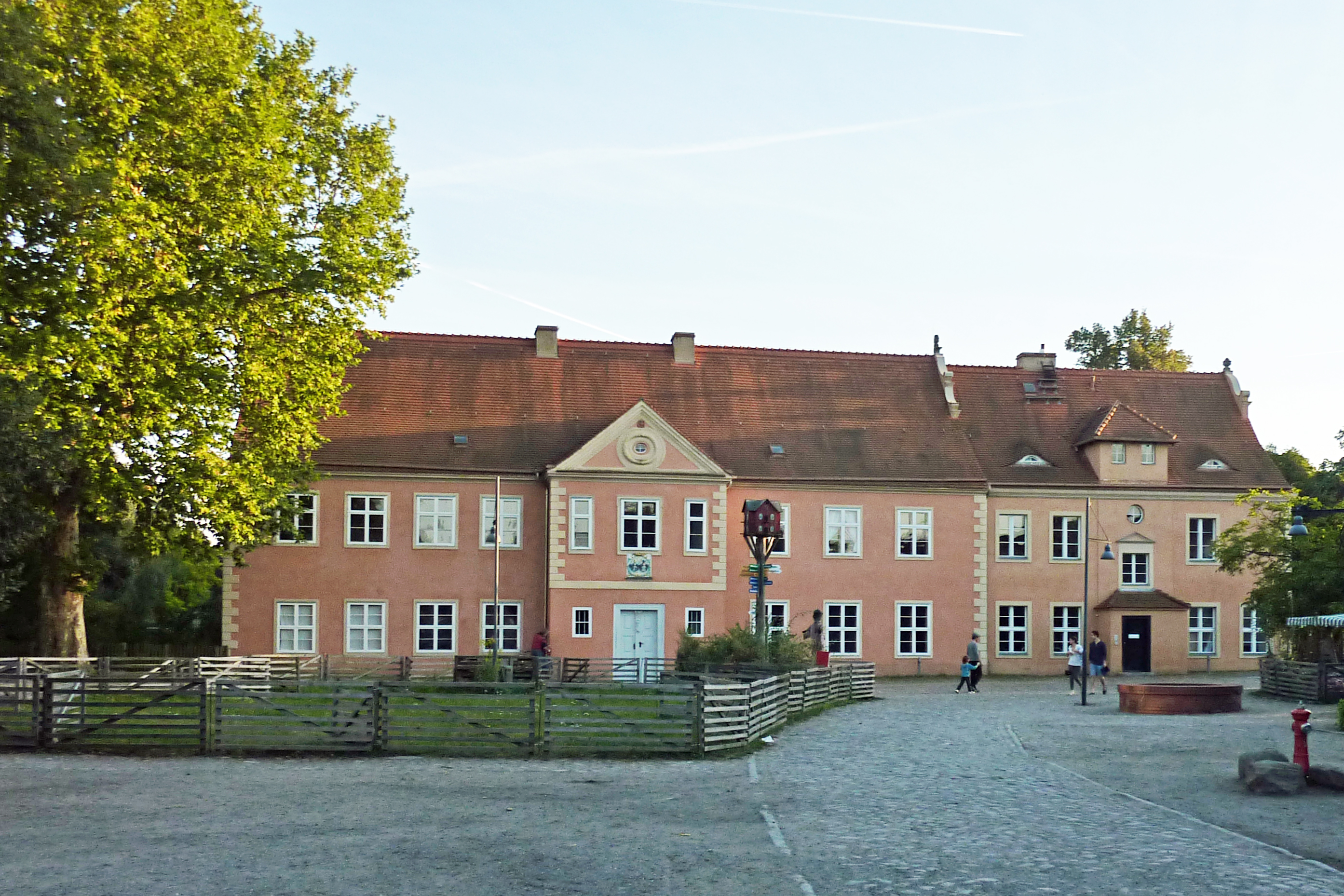
Dahlem Manor

The first written account of Dahlem dates to the year 1275. The history of the village is connected to the Dahlem Demesne (Domäne Dahlem) first mentioned in 1450. Its estates were sold to the state of Prussia in 1841 and developed by dividing it into lots for building villas and mansions, similar to the development of the older mansion settlements of Lichterfelde West and Grunewald. The Demesne buildings today house a working farm and an agricultural open-air museum. In 1920 the village was amalgamated into Greater Berlin. From 1931 on Martin Niemöller, a leader of the Confessing Church, was pastor of the United Protestant Sankt-Annen-Kirche until he was arrested by the Nazis in 1937.

During the Cold War Dahlem belonged to the American Sector of West Berlin. From 1945 to 1991 the seat of the Allied Kommandatura of Berlin was in Dahlem on Kaiserswerther Straße. Today it serves as the office for the president of the local university. Until 1994, the headquarters of the United States Army Berlin command and the Berlin Brigade were located on Clayallee street. Parts of the building are still used by the Embassy of the United States in Berlin. The former library and Outpost theater across the street today house the Allied Museum. Because many of Berlin's artistic, cultural, and educational institutions were located in the city's historical center in the former eastern part of Berlin, West Berlin authorities established many duplicates in Dahlem - above all the Freie Universität Berlin ("Free University Berlin") in 1948, which was established by students and scholars as an antipole to the increasingly communist "Universität Unter den Linden". The newly founded university should uphold the traditional values of academic freedom and the educational ideal proposed by Wilhelm von Humboldt.

Rudi Dutschke, spokesman of the German student movement in the 1960s, is buried at the cemetery of the Sankt-Annen-Kirche.

== Institutions ==
- Freie Universität Berlin (Free University of Berlin, known as FU Berlin)
- Julius Kühn-Institut (Federal Research Centre for Cultivated Plants)
- Prussian Privy State Archives of the Prussian Cultural Heritage Foundation
- German Archaeological Institute
- Institute for Museum Research
- Zuse Institute Berlin
- Several branches of the Max Planck Institute (former Kaiser Wilhelm Institute):
  - The Max Planck Institute Archives
  - The Fritz Haber Institute
  - The Max Planck Institute for Human Development
  - The Max Planck Institute for Molecular Genetics
  - The Max Planck Institute for the History of Science

== Main sights ==
- The Allied Museum of the American, British and French forces in West Berlin
- The Brücke Museum
- Museum of European Cultures
- Dahlem Manor
- Jesus-Christus church, where most of the legendary Berlin Philharmonic recordings were made from the 1950s through the 1980s owing to its fine acoustics
- Jagdschloss Grunewald, a renaissance hunting lodge built in 1543

== Transportation ==
Dahlem is served by the U3 line on the Berlin U-Bahn system. As in the neighboring Wilmersdorf, the historic metro stations are a special feature of the district. Stations in Dahlem include Breitenbachplatz, Podbielskiallee, Dahlem-Dorf, Thielplatz and Oskar-Helene-Heim.

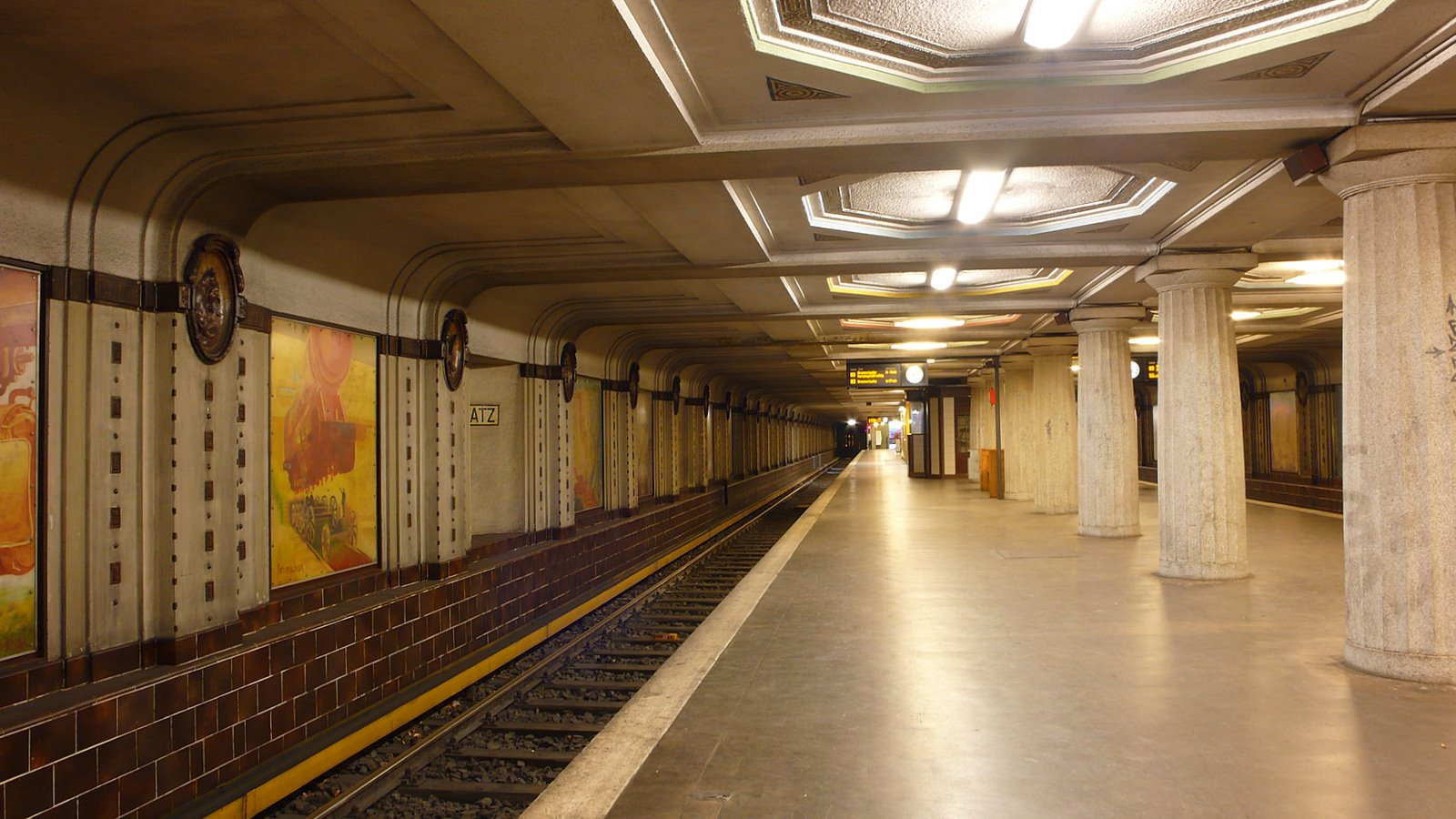
Breitenbachplatz station

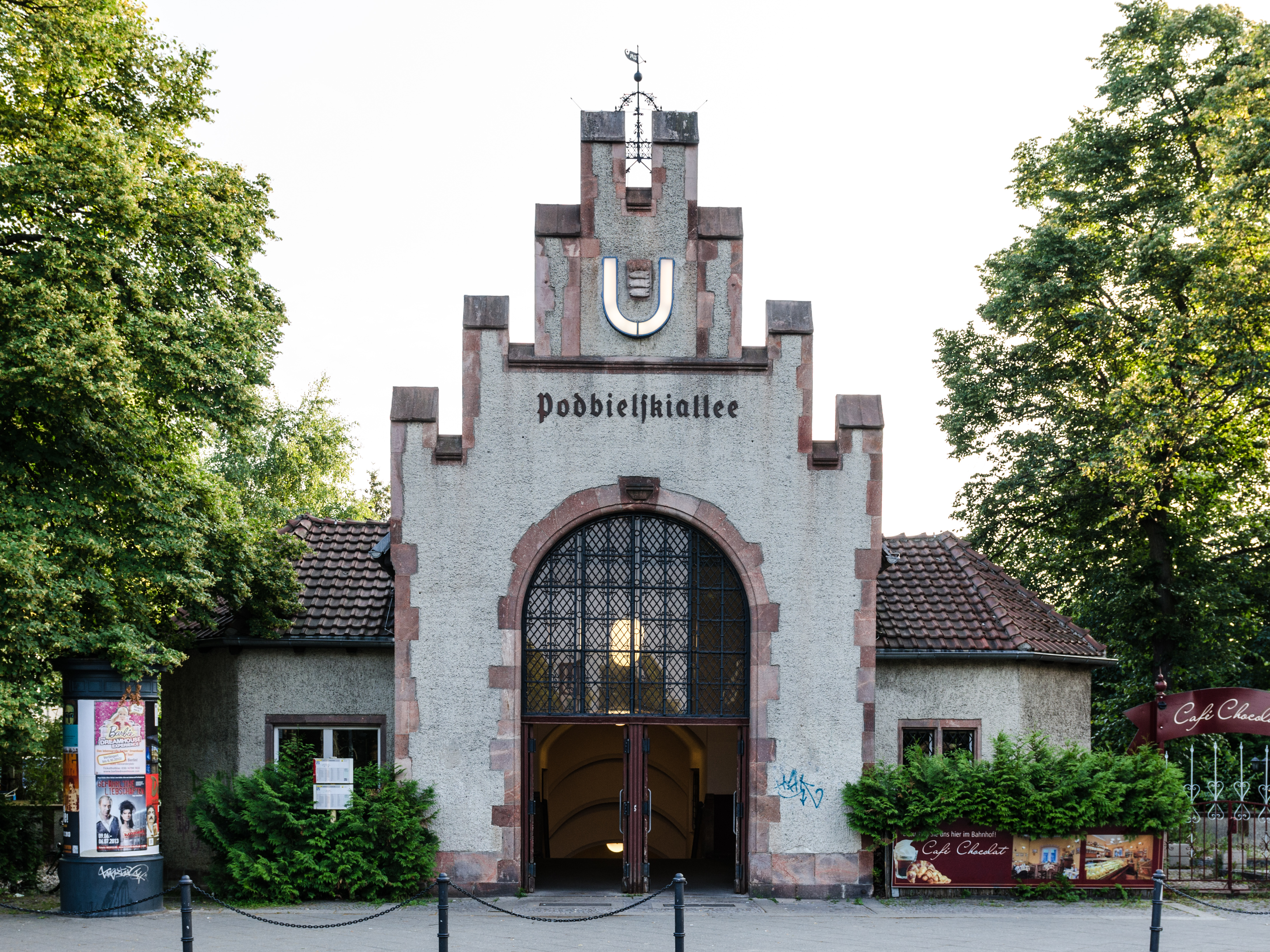
Podbielskiallee station

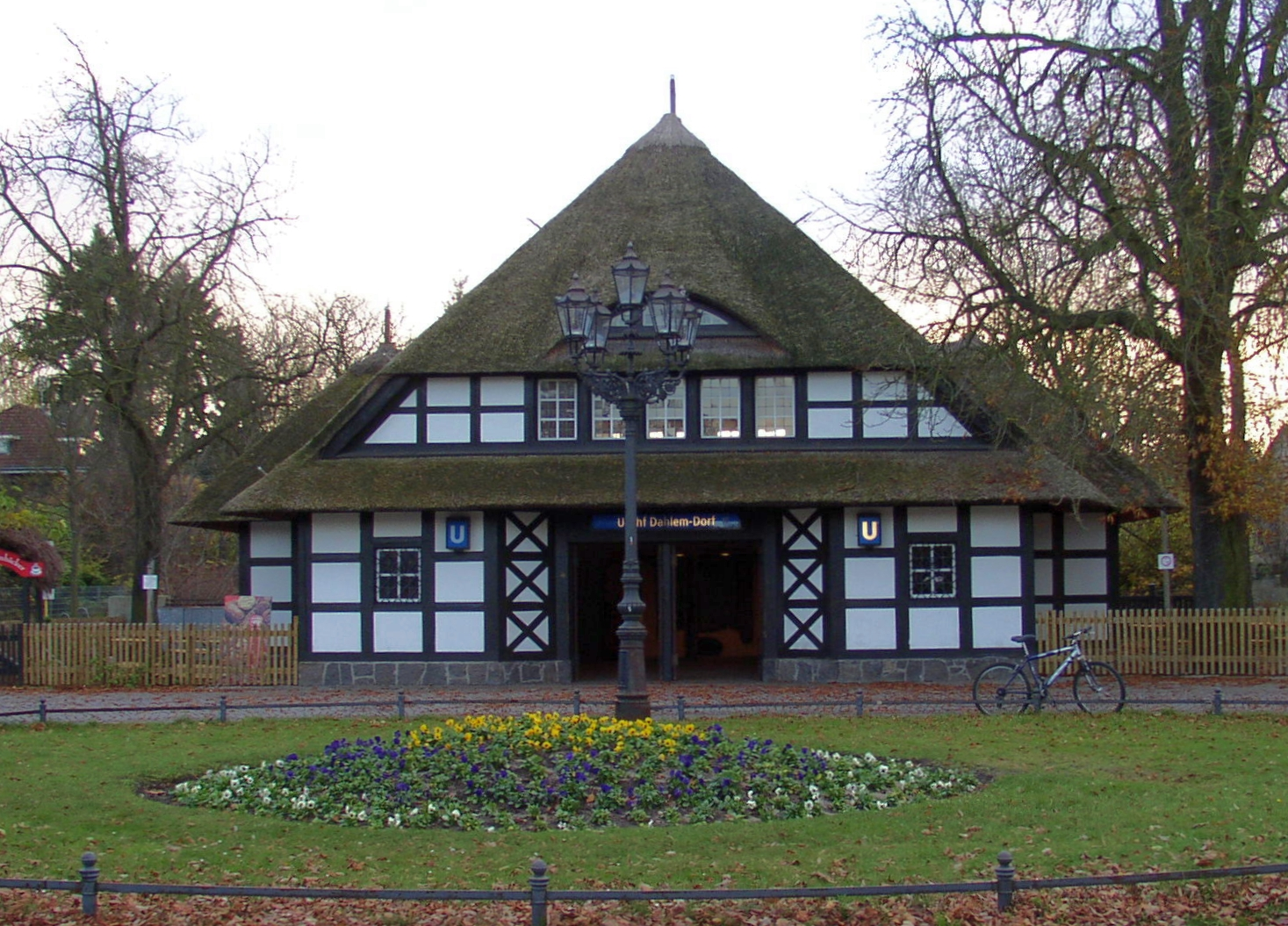
Dahlem Dorf station

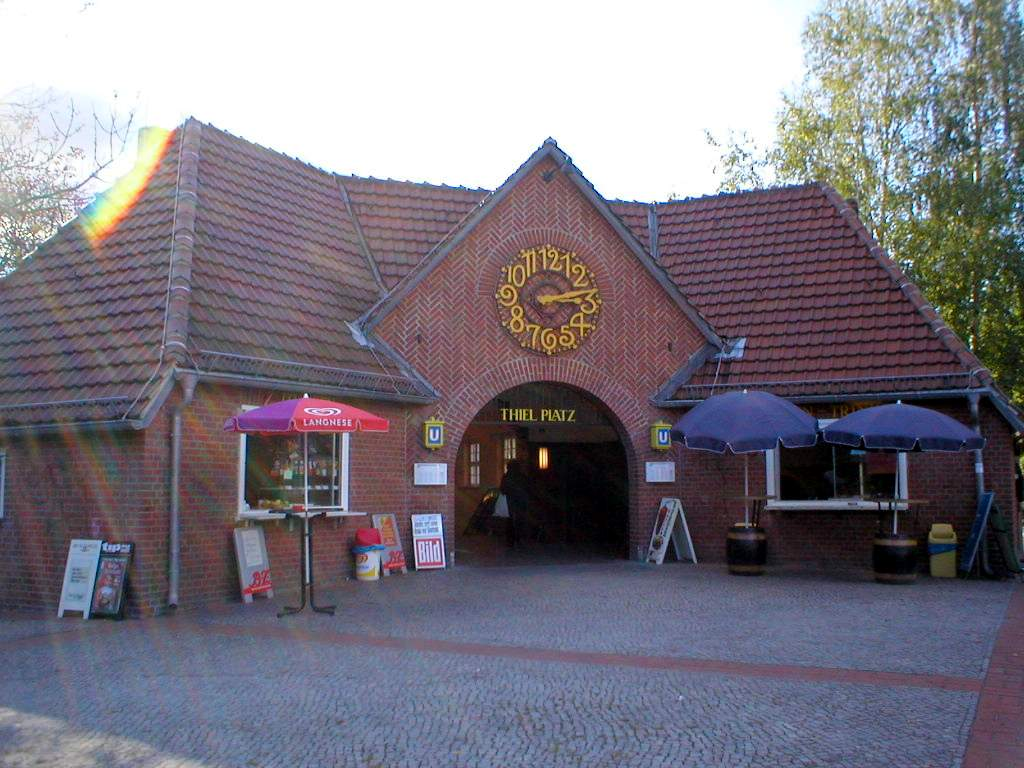
Freie Universität ("Free University") Thielplatz station

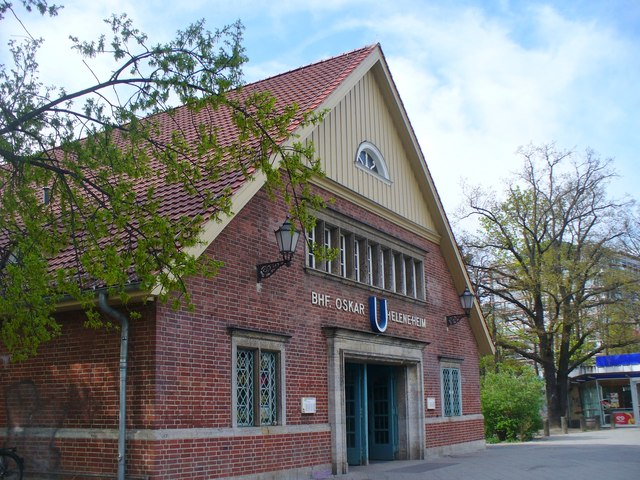
Oskar-Helene-Heim station

== Personalities ==
=== live(d) part of their lifes there ===
- Brigitte Horney, actress
- Karl-Eduard von Schnitzler, journalist
- Wolf Jobst Siedler, publisher and writer
- Max Schmeling, boxer
- Jens Spahn, politician
- Daniel Funke, journalist

== See also ==
- Grunewald forest

== Literature ==
- Durie, William (2012). The British Garrison Berlin 1945 - 1994: nowhere to go ... a pictorial historiography of the British Military occupation / presence in Berlin. Berlin: Vergangenheitsverlag (de). ISBN 978-3-86408-068-5. OCLC 978161722.
- Michael Engel: "Geschichte Dahlems". Berlin-Verlag (Berlin, 1984), ISBN 3-87061-155-3
