= Berlin Heidelberger Platz station =

Train station in Berlin

Heidelberger Platz
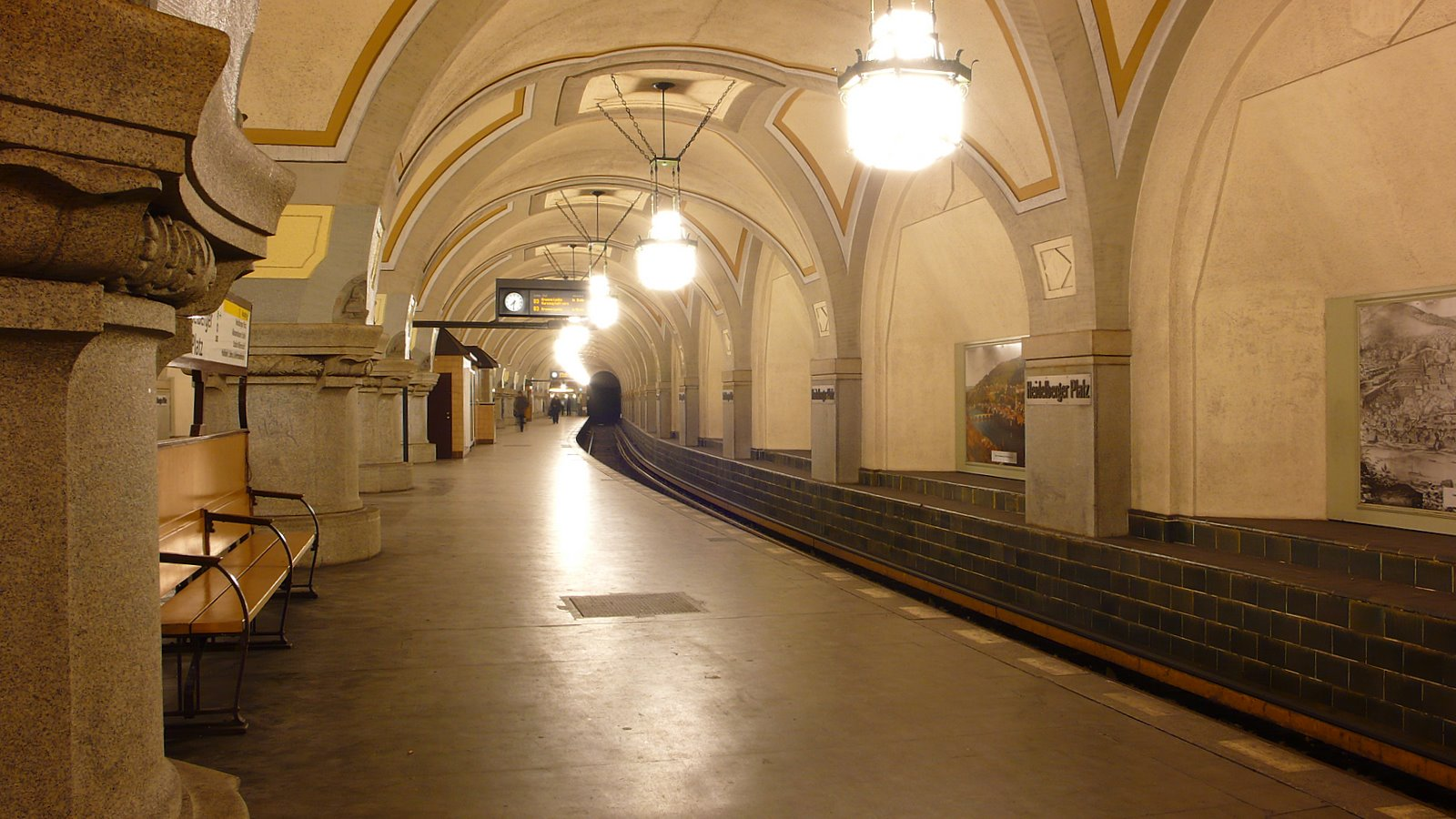
- U-Bahn platform

General information
- Location: Charlottenburg-Wilmersdorf, Berlin, Berlin; Germany
- Coordinates: 52°28′49″N 13°18′45″E
- Platforms: 1; 1
- Tracks: 4; 2

Construction
- Structure type: At grade (Stadtbahn); Underground (U-Bahn)
- Accessible: Yes

Other information
- Station code: 2632
- DS100 code: BHEI
- Category: 4
- Fare zone: VBB: Berlin A/5555
- Website: sbahn.berlin; www.bahnhof.de

History
- Opened: main line: 15 December 1883; 142 years ago 12 October 1913; 112 years ago
- Electrified: at opening 6 November 1928; 97 years ago
- Former names: 1883-1937 Schmargendorf; 1913-date Heidelberger Platz; 1937-1993 Berlin-Schmargendorf

Key dates
- 1890-1892: current building erected
- 1980-1993: operation interrupted

Services
Preceding station	Berlin S-Bahn	Following station
Bundesplatz One-way operation	S41	Hohenzollerndamm Ringbahn (clockwise)
Bundesplatz Ringbahn (counter-clockwise)	S42	Hohenzollerndamm One-way operation
Hohenzollerndamm towards Westend	S46	Bundesplatz towards Königs Wusterhausen
Preceding station	Berlin U-Bahn	Following station
Rüdesheimer Platz towards Krumme Lanke	U3	Fehrbelliner Platz towards Warschauer Straße
Location

Berlin Heidelberger Platz is a railway station in the Wilmersdorf district of Berlin. It is served by S-Bahn lines S41, S42 and S46 and U-Bahn line U3.

The station on the Berlin Ringbahn was opened with the name "Schmargendorf" on 15 December 1883. In 1980 the S-Bahn service was discontinued and the former entrance hall eventually became a nightclub. On 17 December 1993 the S-Bahn station was reopened, now directly connected to the adjacent U-Bahn station and therefore renamed Heidelberger Platz.

The U-Bahn station opened on 12 October 1913 (architect Wilhelm Leitgebel). With its high groin vault it is one of the most brightly decorated of the Berlin network. The eponymous square was named after the city of Heidelberg.

== S-Bahn station ==
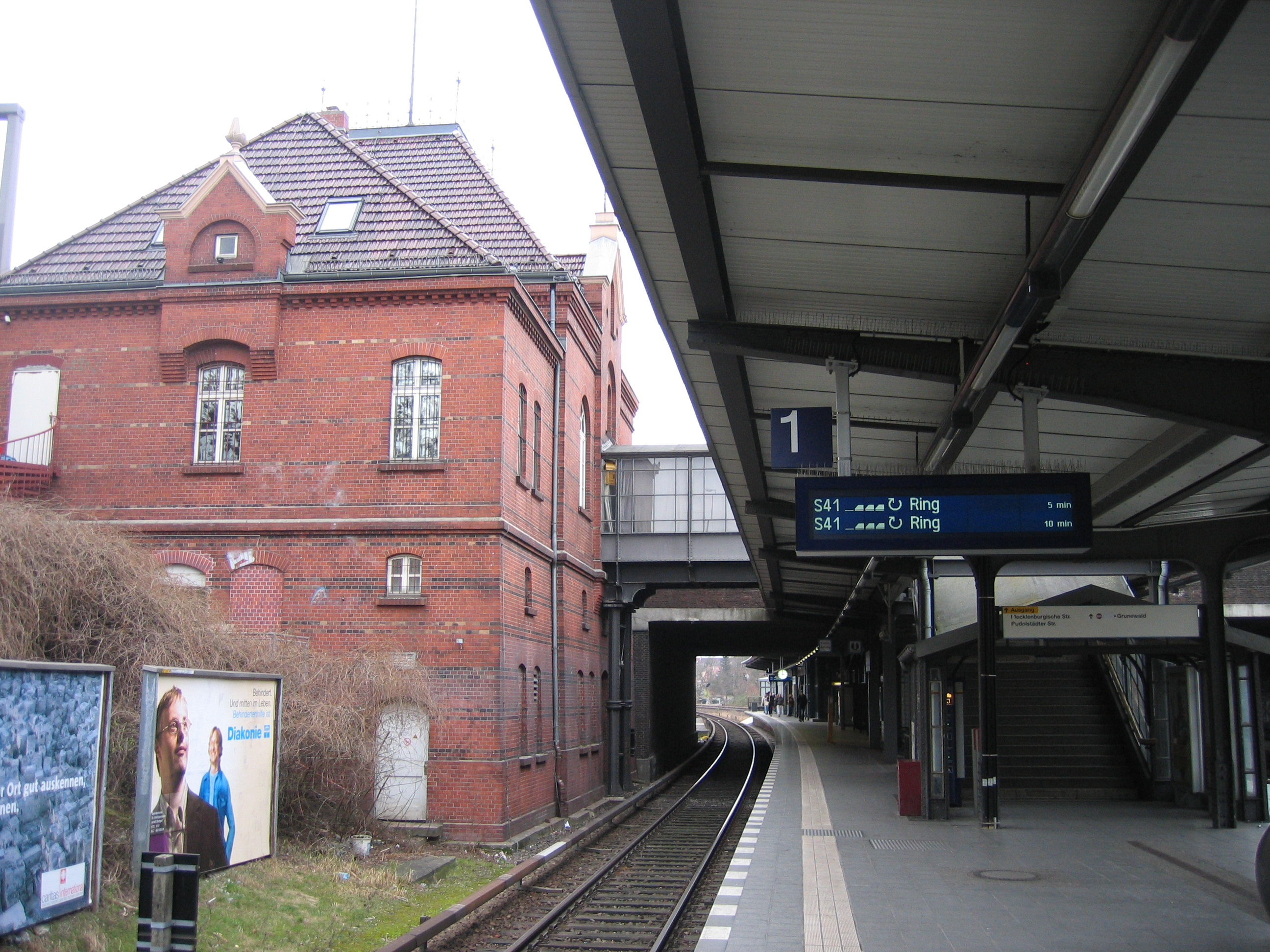
S-Bahn platform

The station on the Ringbahn, which was initially served by steam trains, was opened on 15 December 1883 as Schmargendorf station. The station was expanded between 1890 and 1892, during which the Romanesque Revival style entrance building, which is still preserved today, and a connecting corridor to the island platform, known colloquially as the "greenhouse corridor", were built. The roof initially consisted of a two-row wooden structure, which was replaced by a riveted steel structure in the 1920s. Electrical operation began on 6 November 1928.

During the Second World War, the station was not hit by Allied bombers, so almost the entire station complex continued to exist in the 1950s as it did in the 1920s. Due to the boycott of the S-Bahn in West Berlin that was declared after the construction of the Wall, passenger numbers and thus also revenues fell. The Reichsbahn, as the operator of the S-Bahn in both halves of the city, then cut funding for operations. Repairs were only carried out in emergencies, and the small staff was given significantly longer working hours. The employees' complaints came to a head in September 1980, leading to an open strike between 15 September and 24. S-Bahn traffic on the Ringbahn was completely stopped on the evening of 17 September and was not resumed after the strike ended.

After traffic stopped, the facilities fell into disrepair. Only the entrance building was renovated in the 1980s. However, it burned down shortly afterwards. After the second renovation, a discotheque moved into the building.

In 1989 it was decided to put the Ringbahn back into operation between the Westend and Schöneberg stations. After the Peaceful Revolution, the plans were adjusted and the section between Schöneberg and Baumschulenweg in East Berlin was included. The line was extensively renovated by 1993. The S-Bahn station was moved southeast under Mecklenburgische Strasse in order to allow the construction of an entrance to the other side of the street on the one hand and direct access to the U-Bahn line below on the other. On the northern side, the staircase now runs straight to the street so that passengers are no longer directed through the entrance building. The formal reopening took place on 17 December 1993 with the new name Heidelberger Platz.

== U-Bahn station ==
The Heidelberger Platz U-Bahn station was created as a station on the U-Bahn between Wilmersdorf and Dahlem, now U-Bahn line U3. The station was opened on 12 October 1913.

The city of Wilmersdorf, the builder of the line, was keen to demonstrate its prosperity with the U-Bahn and arranged for all stations in the city to have stone supports rather than steel. The stations themselves differ fundamentally from each other and do not have equivalent features such as shape and equipment.

Since in the case of Heidelberger Platz U-Bahn station the tunnel section had to pass under the Ringbahn, which is in a very deep cutting (especially at this point), the profile was twice as deep as when building other U-Bahn stations. This special low location enabled the responsible architect, Wilhelm Leitgebel, to design a station that resembles a cathedral: the ceiling of the platform was designed as a groin vault, so that with its hanging light candelabras it gives the station a grandiose spatial effect (the station has been occasionally compared in literature to the magnificent stations of the Moscow Metro from the 1930s). The impression is further enhanced by the curved position of the hall and the island platform, which is closed off at both ends by vestibules to which the exits connect. All cladding is made of stone and some of it is made of tiles.

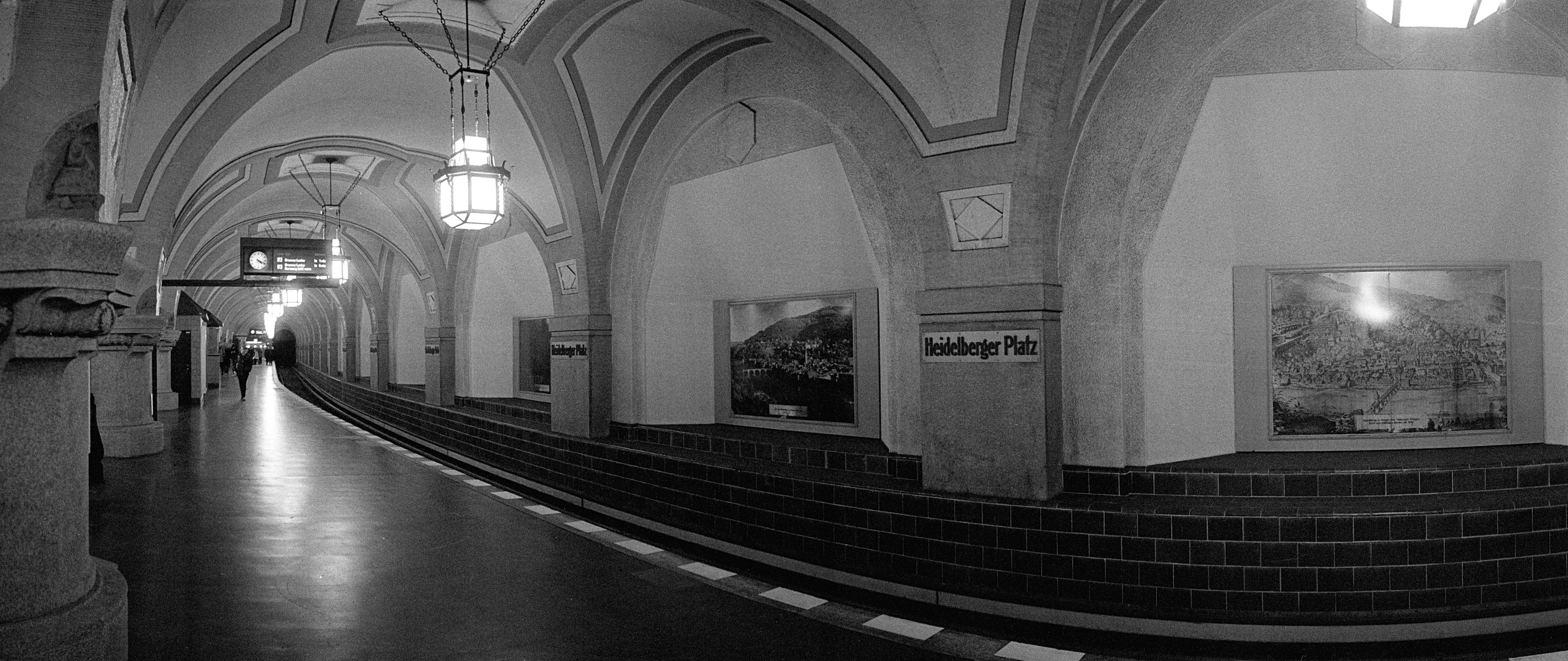
Panoramic photo of the U-Bahn station

Outside the station, the tunnels also have a tunnel-vault-like profile in both directions up to a certain distance, as long as the depth below the earth's surface allows this: in a northeasterly direction under Barstrasse to around 80 m (260 ft) before the corner of Wallenbergstrasse (or around 100 m (330 ft) before crossing under the Bar bridge at Volkspark Wilmersdorf, formerly: Seepark bridge) and in a southeasterly direction under Aßmannshauser Straße to about "halfway" between the corners of Triberger and Siegburger Straße (the purpose of this U-Bahn tunnel construction method, which was very rare in Berlin at the time was the saving of many steel girders, which were required everywhere in other shaft construction).

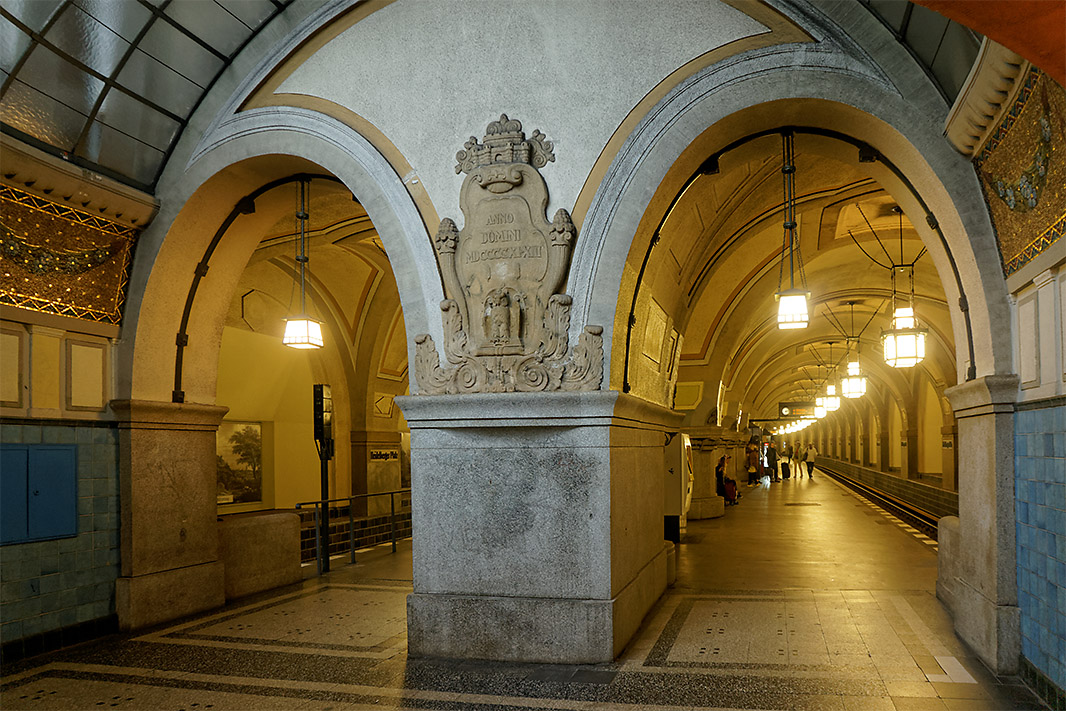
Platform vestibule with access from the S-Bahn station and southern entrance

Later, the northeastern exit in the middle of Mecklenburgische Straße was demolished as part of a road widening project and relocated to the outside. The southern exit with its long corridor under the Ringbahn is still in its original condition.

When designing the U-Bahn station, a direct connection with the Ringbahn station above was provided for, but was not built until the S-Bahn reopened in 1993. At the same time, a lift was built, which is on the southern side of the street.
