= Adolf Jahn =

German sculptor (1858–1941)

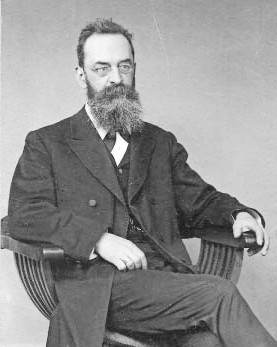
Adolf Jahn; photograph by Hermann Böll (1890s)

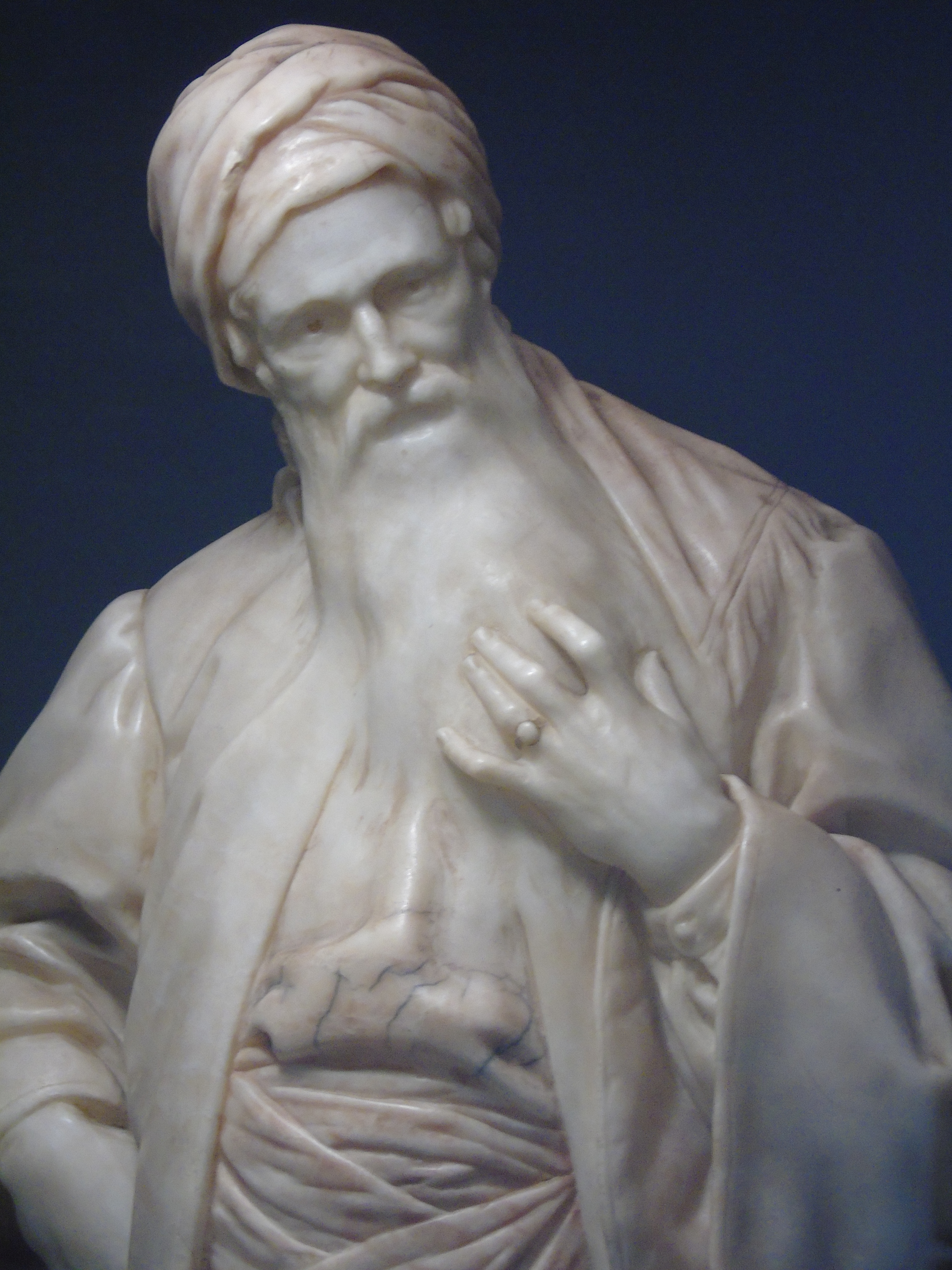
Nathan the Wise

Adolf Ferdinand Walter Jahn (17 December 1858, Stettin – 19 December 1941, Halle) was a German sculptor.

== Life and work ==
His father, Carl Wilhelm, was a merchant who originally came from Crossen an der Oder. His mother, Catharina née Burchard, was the daughter of a teacher from Berlin. They both died while he was still young, and he was raised in Berlin by his father's sister. After attending a trade school, he enrolled at the Prussian Academy of Arts, aged only nineteen, and studied sculpture. His primary instructors from 1877 to 1881 were Albert Wolff and Fritz Schaper. During this period, he won several awards. From 1882 to 1884, he studied in Vienna with Anton Schmidgruber and Viktor Tilgner, then returned to Berlin, where he worked in the studios of Max Kruse, Peter Breuer and Joseph Kaffsack.

He served as a teacher himself; from 1885 at the Royal Prussian Technical College for the Metal Industry in Iserlohn, and from 1892 at Technische Hochschule Berlin (now Technische Universität Berlin), where he taught a class together with Otto Geyer. The sculptor, Lilli Wislicenus, was one of their students.

In 1890, in Vienna, he married Emilie Bertha Porsch (1859-1905), daughter of the lawyer, Ignaz Porsch. They settled in Berlin, where he opened his own workshop in 1891. Their only child, Walter Hugo Otto, was born in 1893. He remained unmarried after Emilie's death and raised Walter alone.

Portrait busts and bronze statuettes were his main focus. From 1893 to 1918, he was an annual participant in the Große Berliner Kunstausstellung, where he presented figures, busts and reliefs in plaster, marble and wood, as well as bronze. Among his best-known works is the statuette of "Nathan the Wise", from the drama of the same name by Gotthold Ephraim Lessing. It has been reproduced in various sizes, in both bronze and alabaster, and in various colors. After 1913, it was produced in porcelain by "Royal Copenhagen".

He retired from all of his public activities after World War I. From 1934 he lived with his son, Walter, and his family in Halle, where he died at the age of eighty-two. He was interred at the Gertraudenfriedhof there.

== Sources ==
- "Jahn, Adolf", In: Allgemeines Lexikon der Bildenden Künstler von der Antike bis zur Gegenwart, Vol. 18: Hubatsch–Ingouf, E. A. Seemann, Leipzig 1925
- Harold Bermann: Bronzes, Sculptors & Founders 1800–1930, Vol.4, Abage, Chicago 1980, pgs.950 and 1128 ISBN 978-0-88740-703-1
- James Mackay: Dictionary of Western Sculptors in Bronze, Antique Collectors' Club, 1977, pg.198
- Brigitte Hüfler: "Beiträge mit Kurzbiographien Berliner Bildhauer", In: Peter Bloch, Sibylle Einholz, Jutta von Simson: Ethos und Pathos. Die Berliner Bildhauerschule 1786–1914, Vol.2, Gebrüder Mann, 1990, ISBN 3-7861-1598-2
- (in German) Eberhard Kasten: Jahn, Adolf. In: Allgemeines Künstlerlexikon. Die Bildenden Künstler aller Zeiten und Völker (AKL). Band 77, de Gruyter, Berlin 2013, ISBN 978-3-11-023182-3, S. 195
