= Wilmersdorf =

- Quarter of Berlin
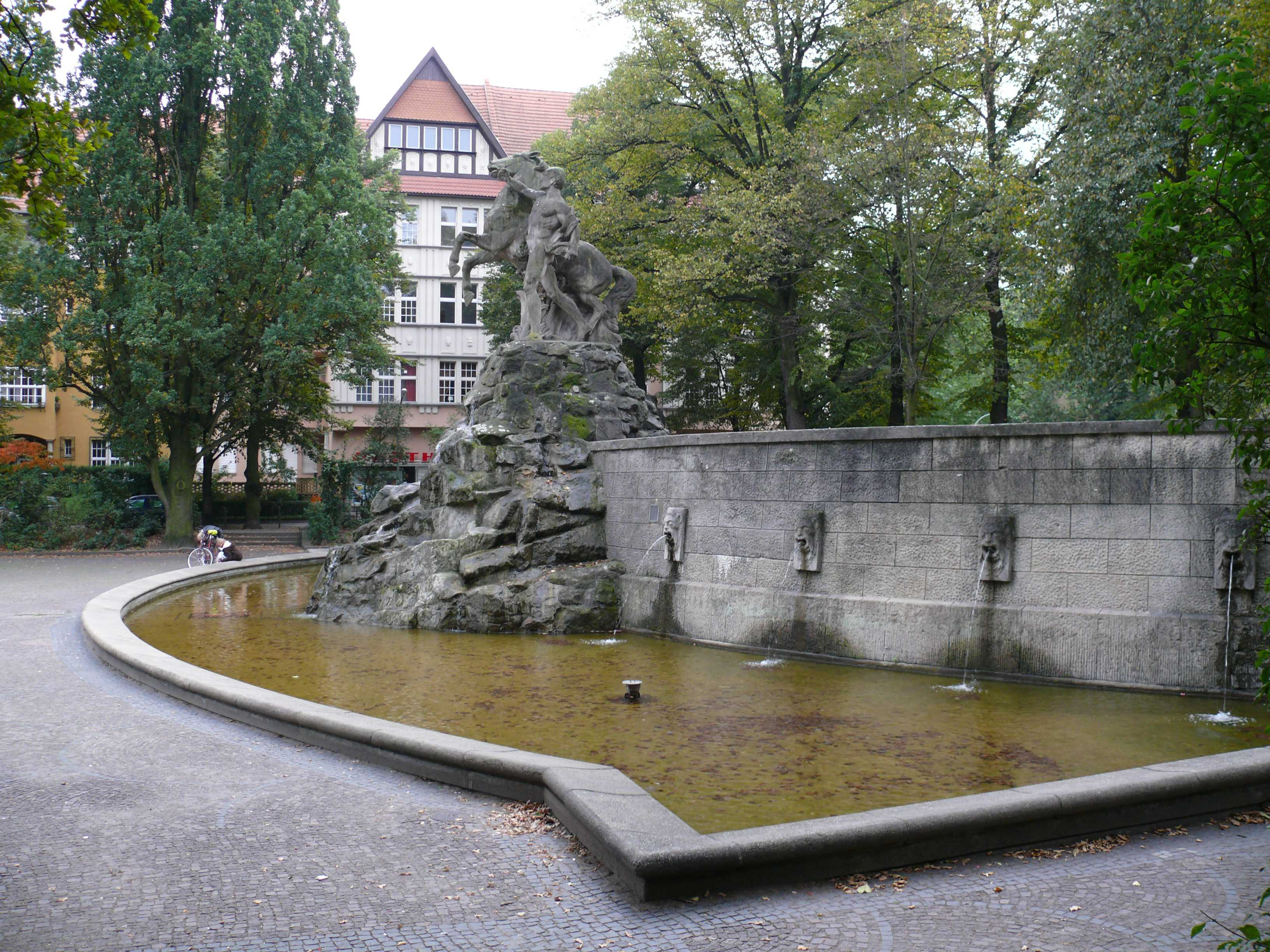
- Rüdesheimer Platz

- Flag Coat of arms

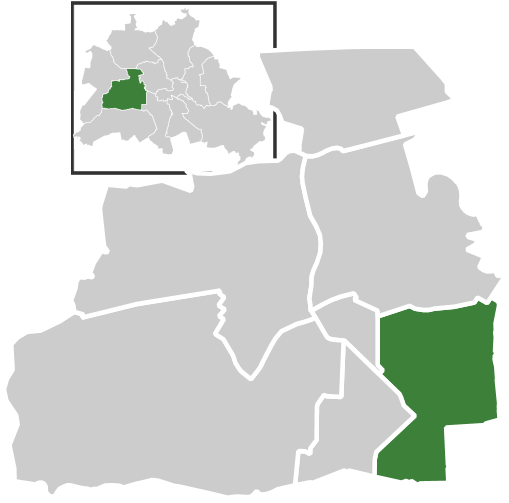
- Location of Wilmersdorf in Charlottenburg-Wilmersdorf and Berlin
- Interactive map of Wilmersdorf
- Location within Germany Location within Berlin
- Coordinates: 52°29′00″N 13°19′00″E
- Country: Germany
- State: Berlin
- City: Berlin
- Borough: Charlottenburg-Wilmersdorf
- Founded: 1220

Area
  - Total: 7.16 km^{2} (2.76 sq mi)
- Elevation: 43 m (141 ft)

Population (2024-12-31)
  - Total: 101,220
  - Density: 14,100/km^{2} (36,600/sq mi)
- Time zone: UTC+01:00 (CET)
  - Summer (DST): UTC+02:00 (CEST)
- Postal codes: 10707, 10709, 10711, 10713, 10715, 10717, 10719, 14197, 14199
- Vehicle registration: B

Wilmersdorf (German pronunciation: [ˈvɪlmɐsdɔʁf]) is an inner-city locality of Berlin which lies south-west of the central city. Formerly a borough by itself, Wilmersdorf became part of the new borough of Charlottenburg-Wilmersdorf following Berlin's 2001 administrative reform.

== History ==
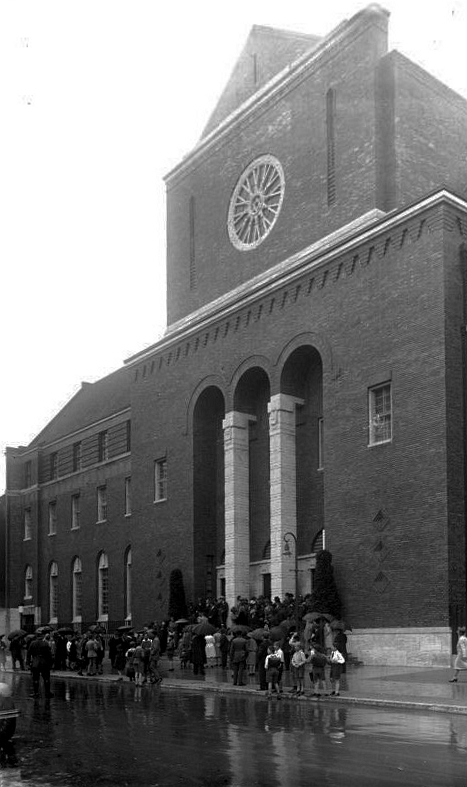
Synagogue of Wilmersdorf, 1930

The village near Berlin was first mentioned in 1293 as Wilmerstorff, probably founded in the course of the German Ostsiedlung under the Ascanian margraves of Brandenburg. From the 1850s on Deutsch-Wilmersdorf was developed as a densely settled, affluent residential area, which in 1920 became a part of Greater Berlin. The former borough of Wilmersdorf included the localities of Halensee, Schmargendorf and Grunewald.

During the era of the Weimar Republic Wilmersdorf was a popular residential area for artists and intellectuals.

After the Russian Revolution, in the late 1910s, Wilmersdorf and Charlottenburg became popular amongst white émigré. Café Prager Diele (formerly located on the corner of Trautenaustraße and Prager Platz) became a meeting points for many prominent Russians in exile. Russian poet Marina Tsvetaeva lived in a house on Trautenaustraße, 9. The memorial plaque was installed on the house by volunteers.

In 1923 the foundation stone for the first mosque in Germany was laid on the initiative of some Islamic students in Wilmersdorf. It was completed in 1925. The so called Wilmersdorfer Moschee (Mosque of Wilmersdorf) is still owned and maintained by the Lahore Ahmadiyya Movement.

In 1933, the year in which Hitler came to power, 13.5% of the population was Jewish; many of them were deported by the Nazis from Berlin-Grunewald Station. Deutsche Bahn established a memorial on 27 January 1998 at the historic track 17 ("Gleis 17"), where most of the deportation trains departed. The synagogue of Wilmersdorf in the Prinzregentenstraße was destroyed by the Nazis in the Reichspogromnacht on 9–10 November 1938. A memorial plaque commemorates the former synagogue. A new synagogue and community centre was established 2007 in the Münstersche Straße for the growing Jewish community in Wilmersdorf.

During World War II, Wilmersdorf was the location of a subcamp of the Sachsenhausen concentration camp. After 1945 Wilmersdorf was located in the British Zone of occupation.

The famous German musical Linie 1 features a song titled "Wilmersdorfer Witwen" ("The Widows of Wilmersdorf"), performed by characters in the show. The song offers a satirical portrayal of the widows of long-deceased Nazis, depicting them as women who "see themselves as the defenders of an older Berlin".

== Sights ==
- Neo-Gothic Roman Catholic Saint Ludwig's Church, 1897
- Borough of the Rheingauviertel with the central Place Rüdesheimer Platz, 1910–1914
- The historical subway stations on the line U3 from the times of the German Empire between Hohenzollerplatz and Rüdesheimer Platz, 1913
- Friedhof Wilmersdorf
- Ahmadiyya Mosque Berlin, Germany's oldest mosque from 1925
- Artist Colony, built by the Guild of the German Stage, 1927
- Schaubühne, famous theatre in the former Universum Cinema by Erich Mendelsohn, 1928
- Kirche am Hohenzollernplatz by Ossip Klarwein and Fritz Höger, 1933
- Russian Orthodox cathedral of the Resurrection of Jesus, 1938
- Power station Berlin-Wilmersdorf, 1977

== Education ==
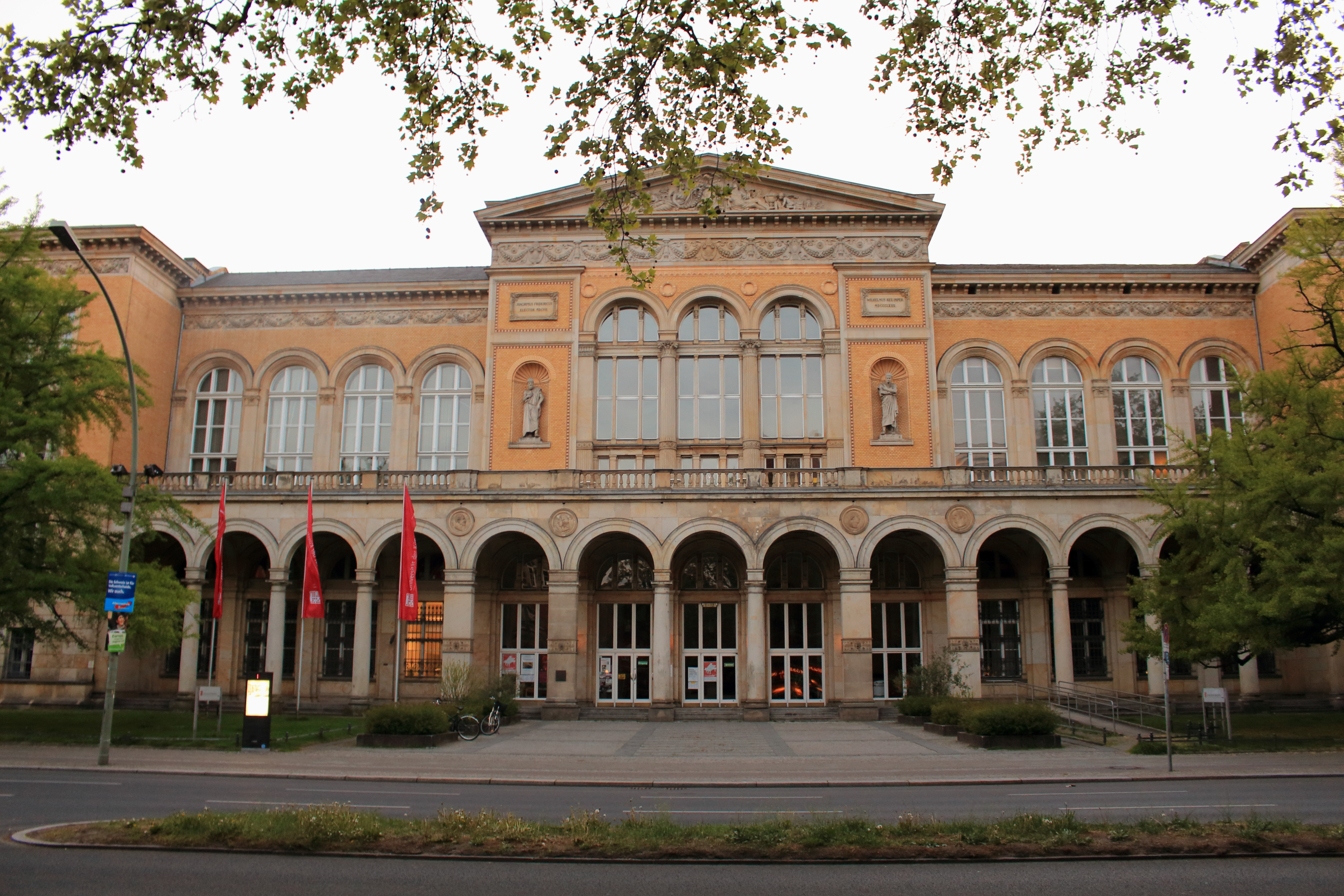
Berlin University of the Arts, faculty of music

=== Higher education ===
- Universität der Künste (Berlin University of Arts), Faculty of Music
- IBZ Berlin, International Meeting Centre of Science

=== Primary and secondary schools ===
- Comenius-Schule, a primary school, is in Wilmersdorf.
- Halensee-Grundschule, a primary school, is in Halensee, near Wilmersdorf.
- Svenska Skolan Berlin, Swedish School Berlin
- Katholische Grundschule Sankt Ludwig, a catholic primary school
- Nelson-Mandela-School, International School
- Friedrich-Ebert-Gymnasium, a secondary school which is close to the Fennsee.
- Goethe-Gymnasium, one of the most popular secondary schools in Berlin
- Annie Heuser Schule, a private Waldorf education school

=== Weekend schools ===
- Zentrale Schule fur Japanisch Berlin e.V. (共益法人ベルリン中央学園補習授業校 Kyōeki Hōjin Berurin Chūō Gakuen Hoshū Jugyō Kō), is a weekend Japanese supplementary school. Established April 1997. The Japanische Ergänzungsschule in Berlin e.V. (ベルリン日本語補習授業校 Berurin Nihongo Hoshū Jugyō Kō), another weekend Japanese school, is held at Halensee-Grundschule.

== Notable people ==
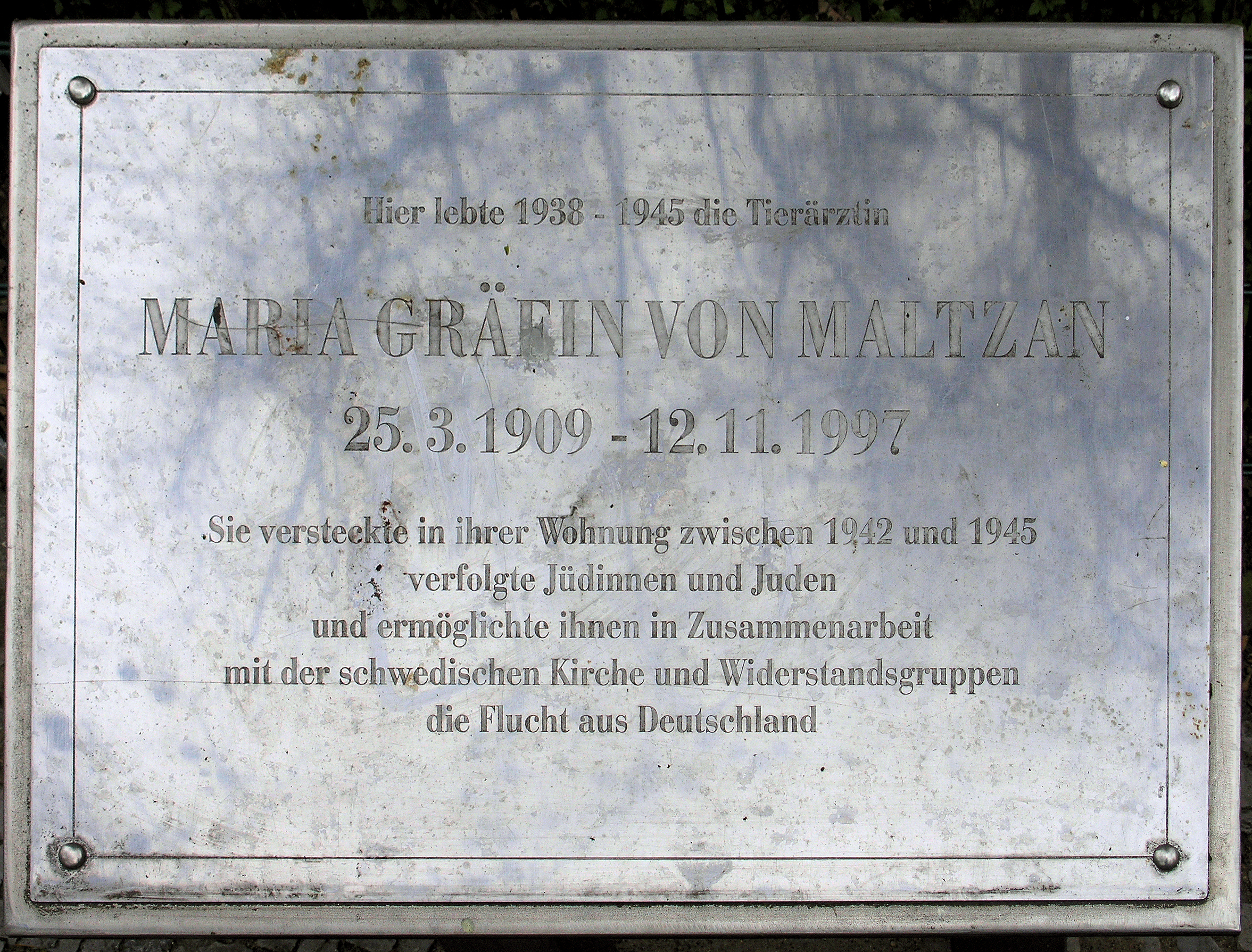
Plaque commemorating Maria von Maltzan, Detmolder Straße 11

- Maria von Maltzan German resistance against Adolf Hitler and the Nazi party, saved the lives of Jews in Berlin. Lived at Detmolder Straße 11, 1909–1997.
- Paul Abraham, composer lived before he left Germany in 1933.
- Jérôme Boateng, footballer for Bayern Munich and Germany, grew up in the area.
- Heinz Berggruen, art dealer and founder of Museum Berggruen, grew up in the area
- Berthold Brecht, poet, lived in Wilmersdorf with his partner Helene Weigel, until they left Germany in 1933.
- Marlene Dietrich, actress, lived with her husband and her family in Wilmersdorf, before they finally left Germany in 1933.
- Franz Pfemfert, published Die Aktion, the anti-nationalist, anti-militarist expressionist journal from premises at Nassauische Straße 17, 1911–1932.
- Margarete Kahn, one of the first women to obtain a doctorate in Germany, Holocaust victim. Lived at 127 Rudolstädter Straße.
- Erich Kästner, author and poet, lived in Wilmersdorf, while he wrote Emil and the Detectives, one of the most famous children's novels in Germany. The view out of his window with the colorful street scene at the Prager Platz was the inspiration for the book.
- Eva Siewert, journalist, writer and activist, grew up in Wilmersdorf.
- Hans Haustein (August 27, 1894 in Berlin – November 12, 1933 Ibid.) was a Jewish doctor and scientist in the Weimar Republic.
- Konrad Zuse (June 22, 1910 – December 18, 1995), German inventor, born in Wilmersdorf
- Ski Aggu, musical artist and rapper born and raised in Wilmersdorf. He references his upbringing in the title of his 2024 album Wilmersdorfs Kind.

== Photogallery ==
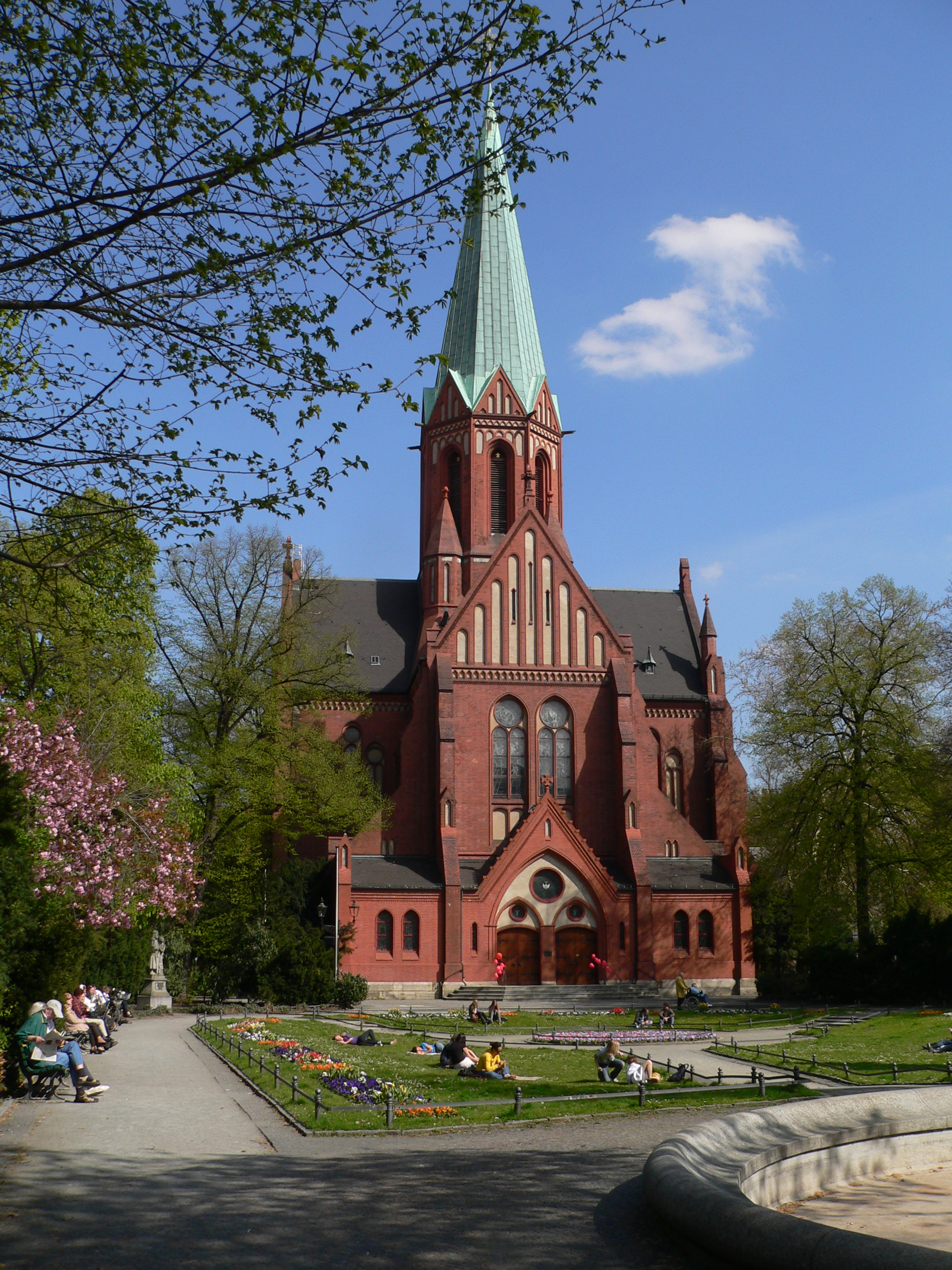
St.-Ludwig's-Church

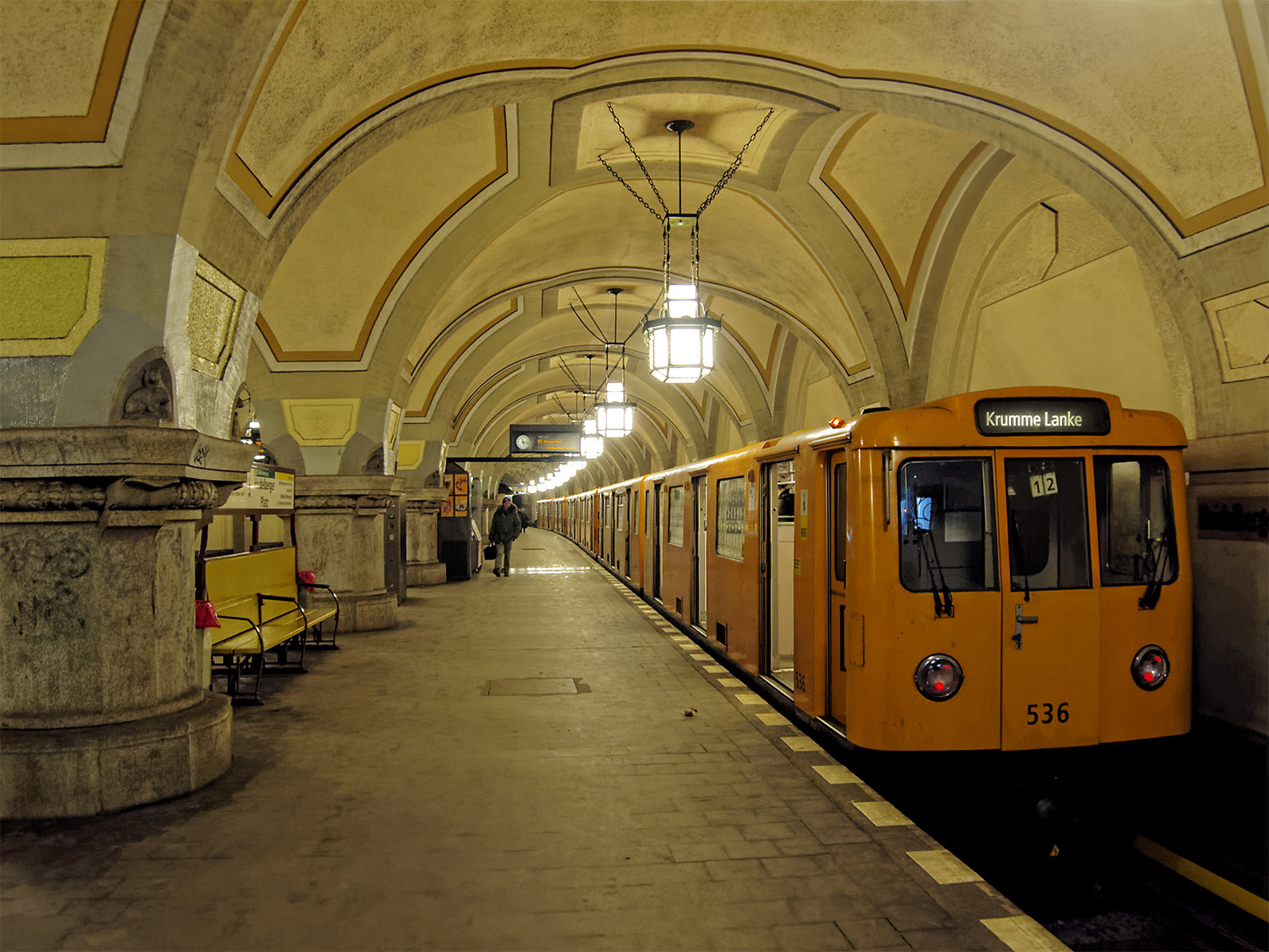
Berlin Heidelberger Platz station

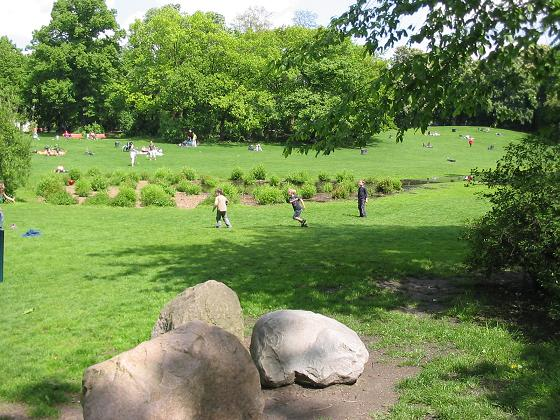
Volkspark Wilmersdorf

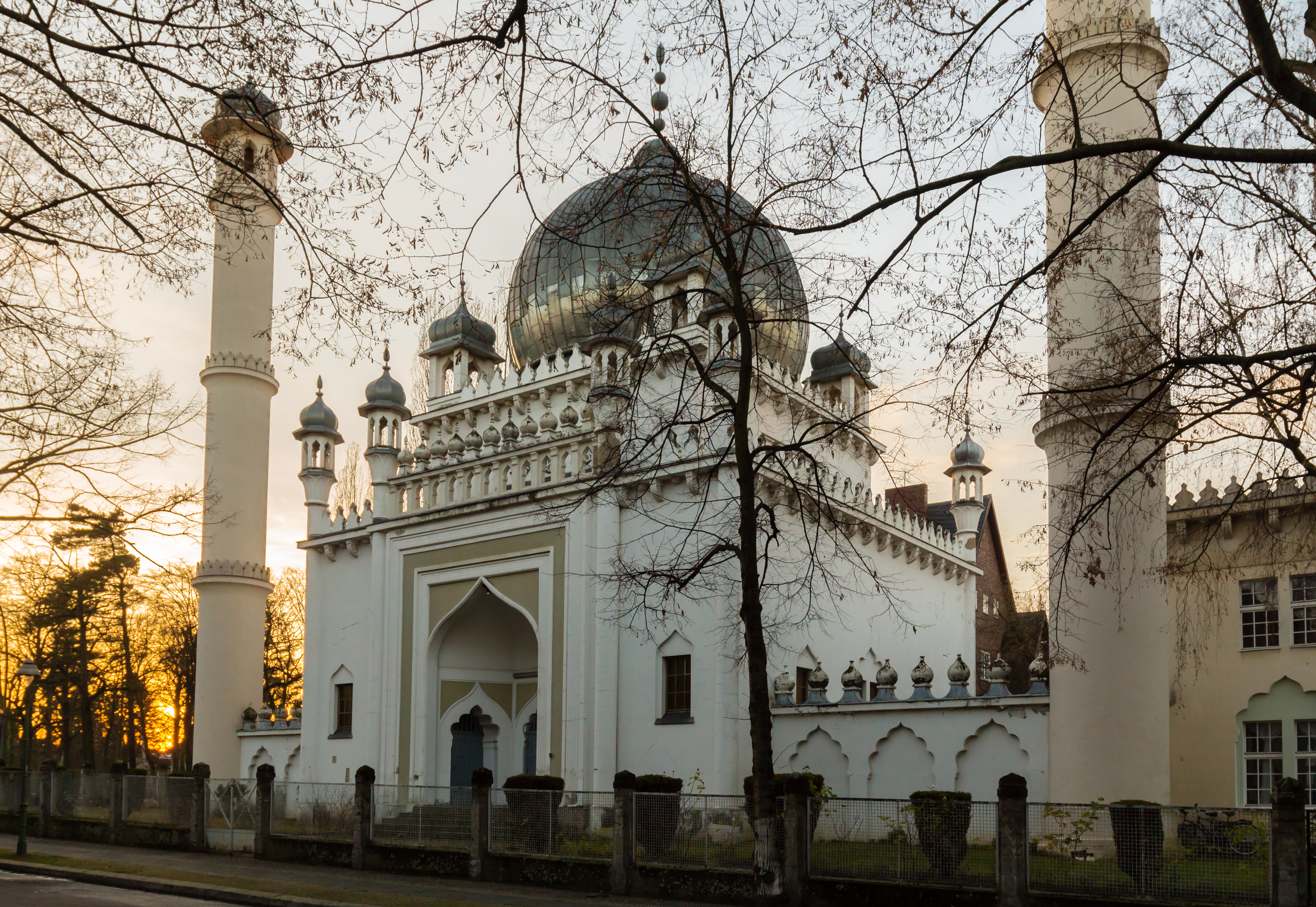
Berlin Mosque

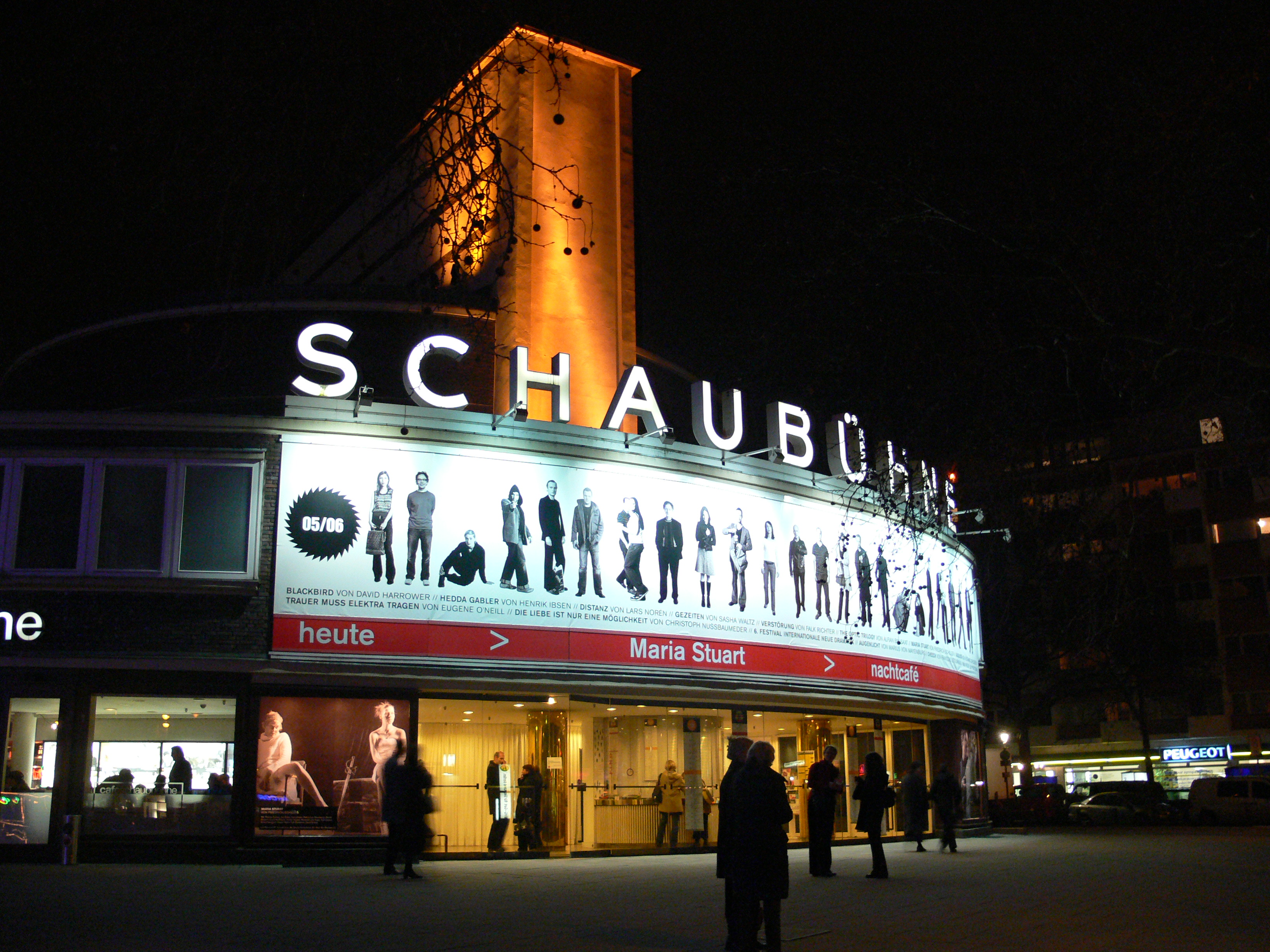
Theatre Schaubühne

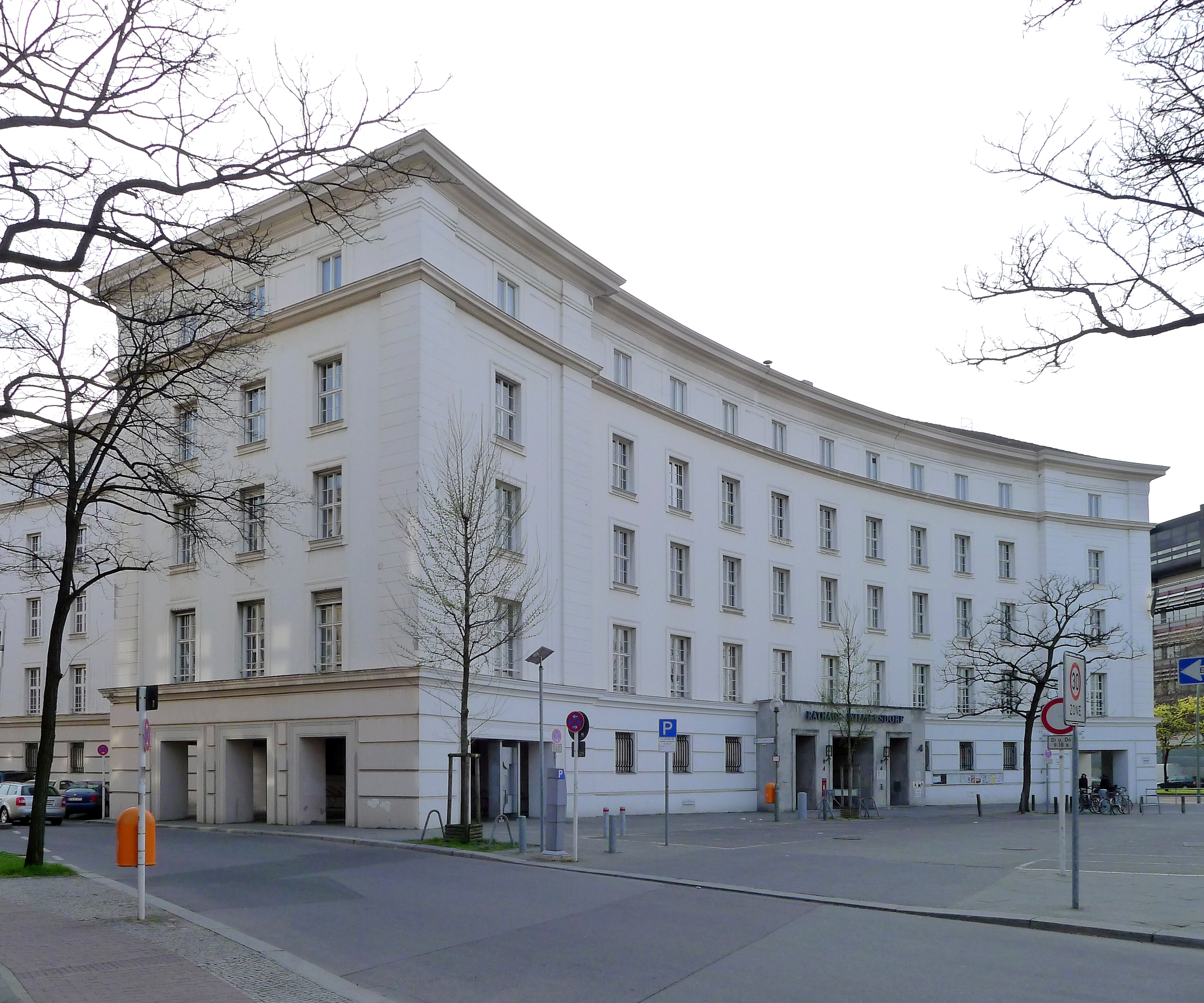
Town Hall
