= Otto Geyer =

German sculptor (1843–1914)

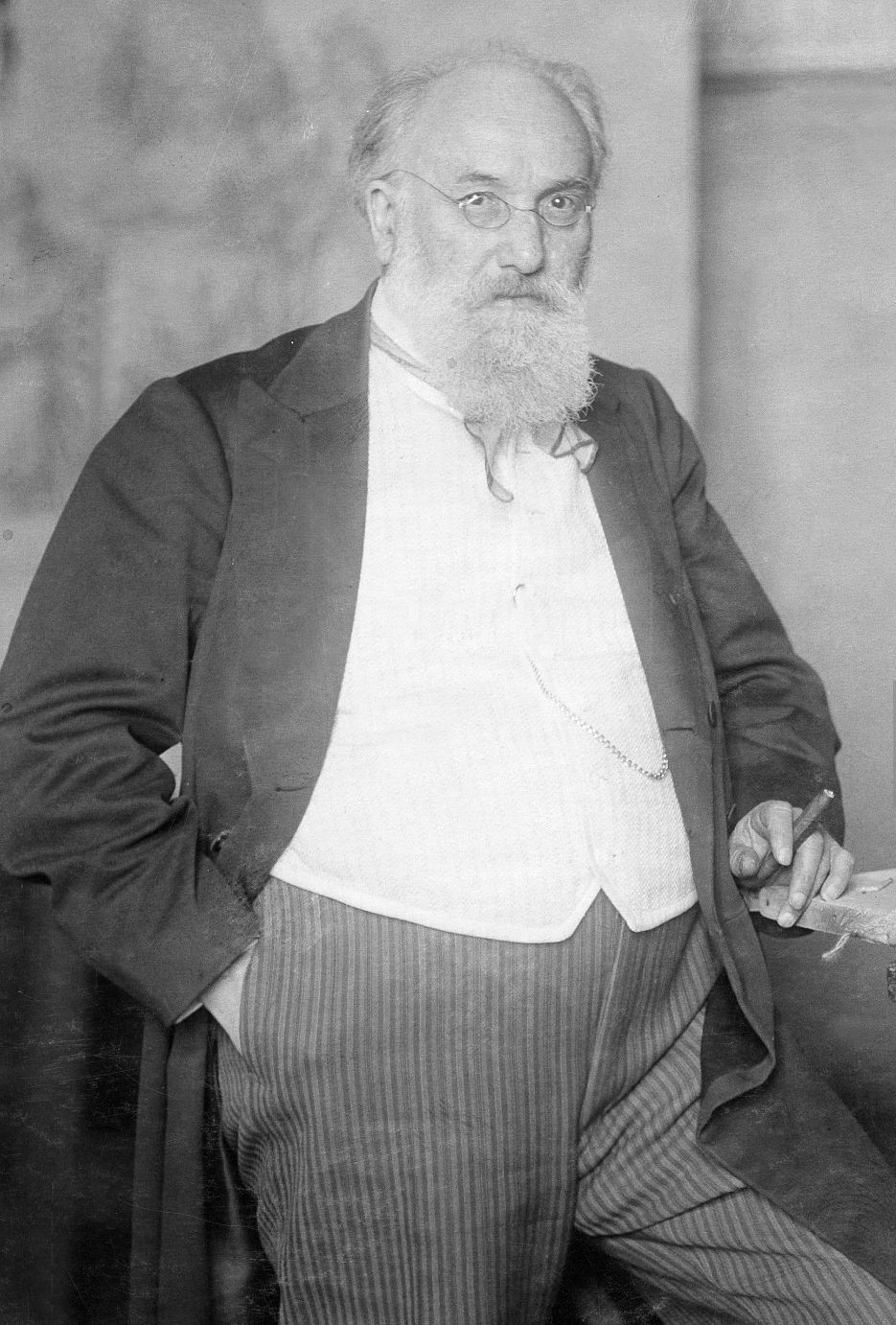
Otto Geyer (before 1910)

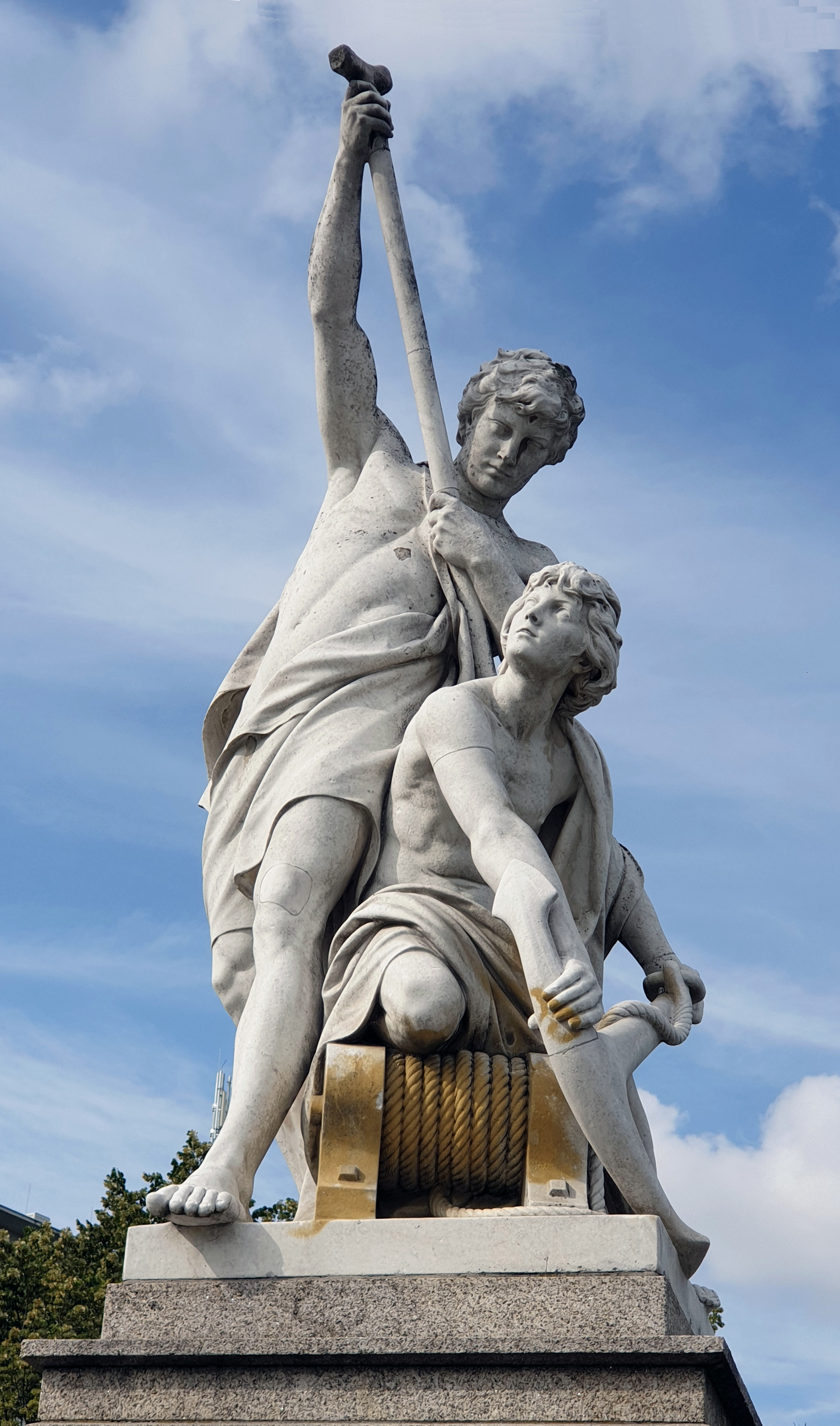
"River Navigation" on the Hallesche-Tor-Brücke, Kreuzberg

Karl Ludwig Otto Geyer (8 January 1843 – March 1914) was a German sculptor. His brother was the architect, Albert Geyer.

== Life and work ==
Geyer was born and raised in Charlottenburg. His father, Friedrich Wilhelm Ludwig Geyer, was an Archdeacon in the Evangelical Church. From 1859 to 1864, he studied at the Prussian Academy of Arts and worked in the studios of the sculptor Hermann Schievelbein. Following Schievelbein's death in 1867, Geyer took over his studio. He continued his studies in 1869 at the Thorvaldsen Museum in Copenhagen.

After 1891, he taught ornamental and figure modelling at the Technischen Hochschule Charlottenburg (now Technische Universität Berlin), succeeding Bernhard Roemer (1852–1891), who had died suddenly. The following year, he also began teaching at the Arts and Crafts School, where he served as Director from 1904 to 1913. He was named a professor in 1893. His students included the sculptor Lilli Wislicenus and the porcelain artist Hugo Meisel (1887–1966).

He died shortly after retiring, at the age of seventy-one, and was interred at the Friedhof Wilmersdorf. The grave has not been preserved. A memorial tablet and statue, donated by his daughters, were later placed in the Waldfriedhof Zehlendorf.

Some of his works may be seen outside Germany, at the Gare de Strasbourg, in the main hall. They include two large statues of female allegorical figures, representing Industry and Agriculture, and reliefs on the original façade.
