= Hans Haustein =

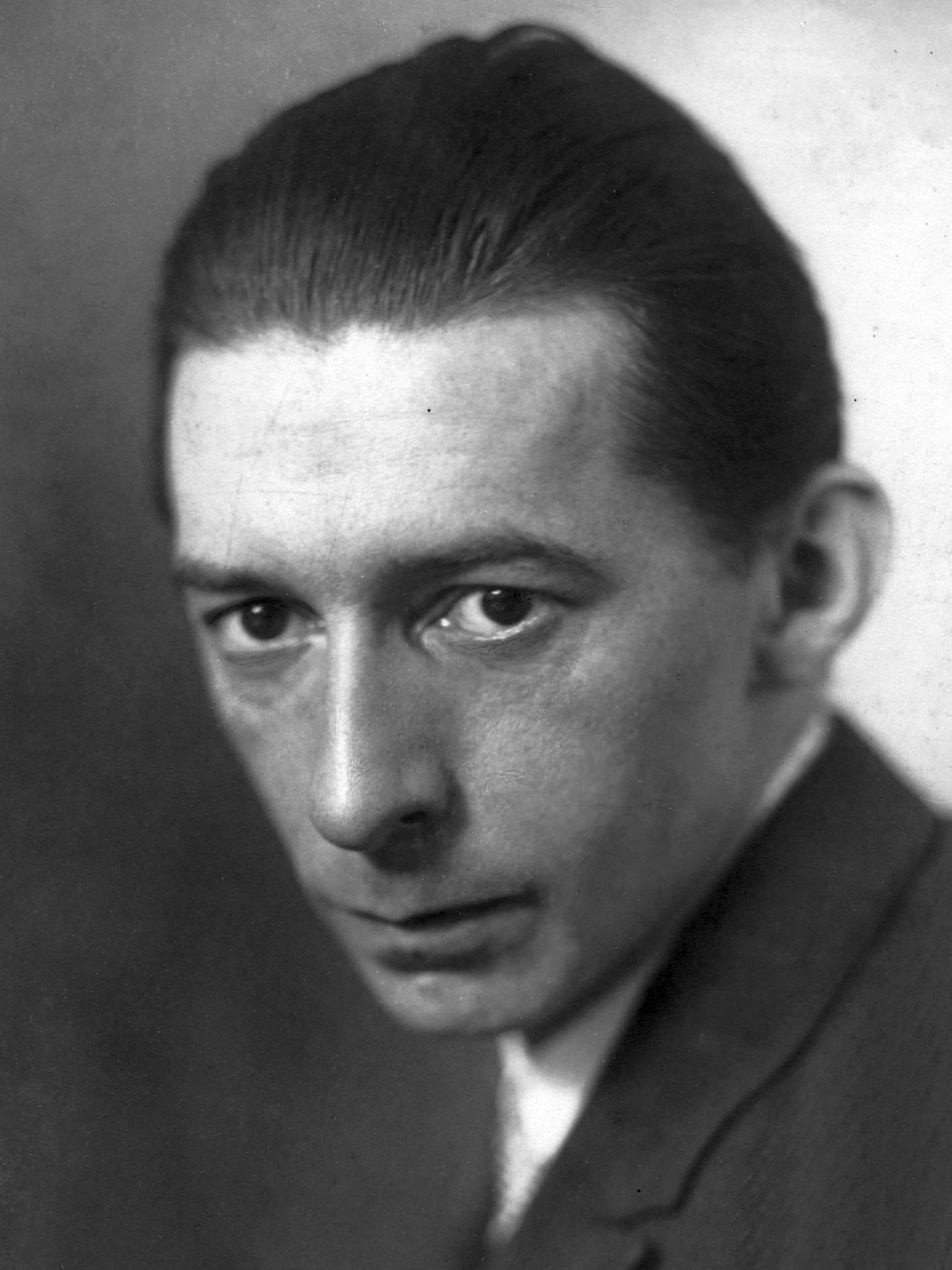
Hans Haustein 1925

Hans Haustein (August 27, 1894 – November 12, 1933) was a Jewish medical doctor and scientist in the Weimar Republic.

== Life ==
Haustein was born and died in Berlin.

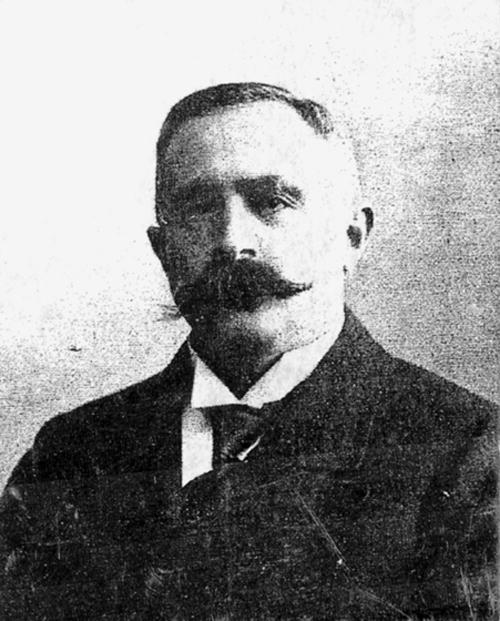
Abraham Buschke, a teacher of Hans Hausteins, was a senior doctor at Rudolf Virchow Hospital in Berlin. He died in 1943 in the concentration camp in Theresienstadt.

Hans Haustein studied medicine in Freiburg im Breisgau and Berlin from 1913 to 1918. In 1920, he completed a Doctorate in Berlin. Afterwards, he received his medical licence and became a medical assistant. His teachers in the fields of dermatology and venereology were Abraham Buschke, at Rudolf Virchow Hospital, as well as Georg Arndt, at the dermatology clinic of the Charité – Berlin University of Medicine.

In 1924, soon after Haustein was made a consultant in skin diseases and sexually transmitted diseases, he opened a surgery on Kurfürstendamm. This afforded him an affluent clientele of high social status. He gained a reputation as a fashionable doctor, who also treated prostitutes and supplied them with pessaries for birth control. As a consultant, he was both a colleague and a rival of Gottfried Benn, who practised on Belle-Alliance-Street, today Mehringdamm.

He lived in a large house on 4 Bregenzer Street in Berlin-Wilmersdorf, which was a centre for high society. In these rooms, he hosted lavish parties at which writers, composers, painters and patrons gathered. At the time of the Weimar Republic, a large proportion of Wilmersdorf's population was Jewish. Numerous Jewish artists and writers lived in this district. Haustein, who was known for his intellectual and erotic permissiveness, was regarded as a lounge lizard. He was in a relationship with a model called Sonja, who he is said to have been sexually dependent on. Among his closest friends were the writer Lion Feuchtwanger, the composer Fred Raymond and the painter Christian Schad, who painted a portrait of him in the style of magical realism in 1928. Haustein's lover Sonja can also be seen as a shadow on the wall in this painting.

Haustein was also an academic and was considered one of the leading experts in combating venereal diseases. From 1916 on, he published over 70 works, including, his seminal works such as Venereal Diseases inclusive of Prostitution and The Early History of Syphilis. From 1921 until 1923, he worked for the magazine Social Hygiene, Welfare and the Hospital System. From 1932 he led the historical section of the Department of Genetics at the Kaiser-Wilhelm Institute for Brain Research in Buch, Berlin.

When the National Socialists Machtergreifung in 1933, Haustein suddenly lost his upper-class status and faced discrimination and persecution. His medical license was revoked and he had to endure house searches and interrogations. On 7 July 1933, he was arrested along with other Jewish and politically unpopular doctors and was severely maltreated in a provisional concentration camp. After these experiences, Haustein had no illusions over his fate as a Jew. When the Gestapo attempted to arrest him on 12 November 1933, he killed himself with cyanide.

== Background ==
As early as April 22, 1933, the Nazi regime revoked the medical license of Jewish and politically left wing doctors, applying the new regulations of medical admission, thereby taking away their means of existence. While communist and socialist doctors had absolutely no right to object, their Jewish colleagues, who had already had a practice during World War I or had fought on the front line, could keep practicing for the time being. However, the Nazi regime restricted the opportunity increasingly in the subsequent years and eventually prohibited all of the Jewish doctors from exercising their profession from September 30, 1938 onwards by means of the fourth act of the law of the citizens of the Third Reich in Nazi Germany. Only a few of them were given permission – as so-called treaters of sick people – to take exclusively care of Jewish patients. The Nazi regime thought this gradual procedure was necessary because in Berlin in 1933 2000 out of 3600 health service doctors were Jewish according to the National Social categorisation and medical care had to be ensured.

Most doctors were presumably accepting of the procedure towards their Jewish colleagues and also profited from this. All of a sudden, the opportunity to take over a practice presented itself to young doctors in particular. This behaviour on the part of many doctors made it much more difficult to confront the past after the Second World War. It wasn't until recently that the role of the medical profession and Associations of Statutory Health Insurance Physicians in the era of National Socialism began to be examined. An example of this is the medical historian Rebecca Schwoch's 2009 investigation into the history of the Associations of SHI Physicians in Berlin titled ‘Jewish Doctors in Berlin and their Fate in National Socialism’. The long-lasting research work was financed by the donations of the National Association of Statutory Health Insurance Physicians, German Medical Association and the German Medical Journal. In the subsequent period, the Association of Statutory Health Insurance Physicians in Bavaria began an academic study of the fate of Jewish doctors in Nazi Germany und die Ärztekammer Niedersachsen veröffentlichte eine Broschüre zum Gedenken an jüdische Kollegen. and the Medical Association of Lower Saxony published a booklet in commemoration of their Jewish colleagues. In 2018, the Scientific Services of the German Bundestag released a short documentary about the exclusion, disenfranchisement and persecution of Jewish doctors under National Socialism for the members of the German Bundestag.

== Publications (selection) ==
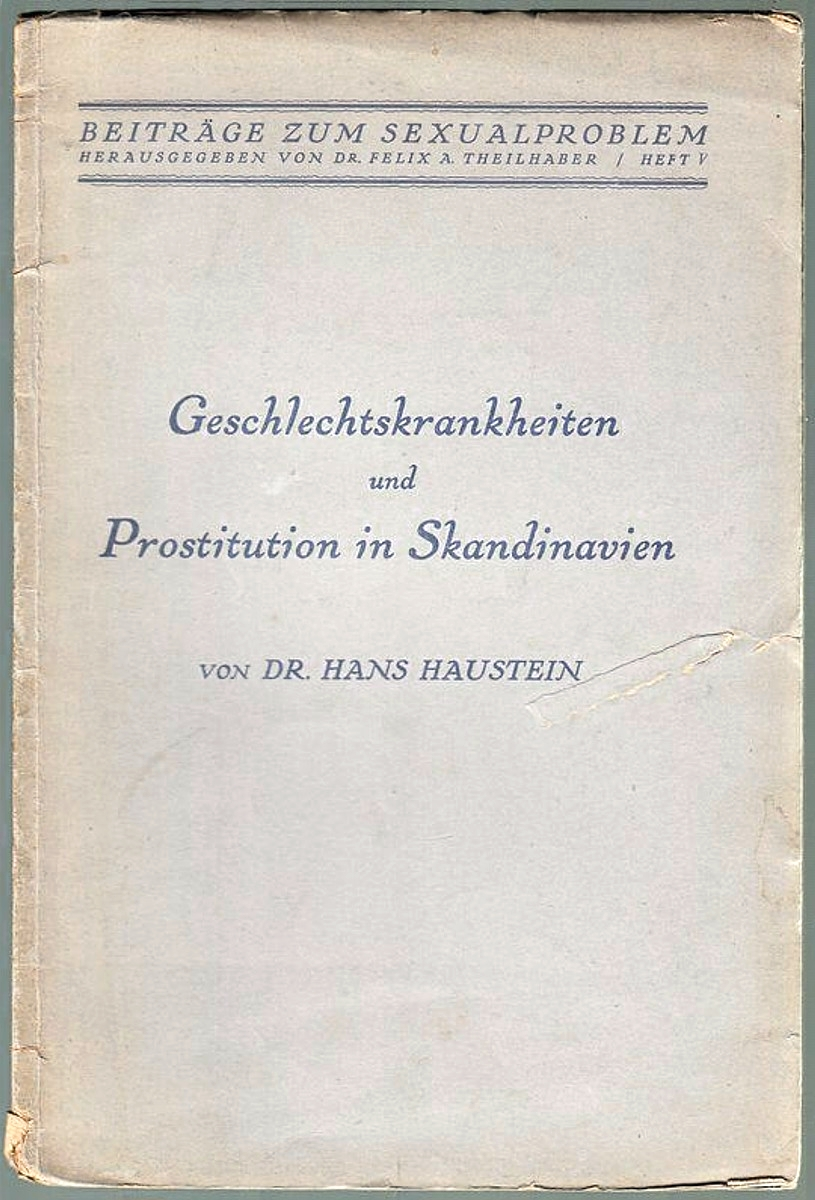
Hans Haustein: Sexual diseases and prostitution in Scandinavia (1925)

- Hans Haustein: Die Hautfarbentafel Felix von Luschans nach Davenports Methode entmischt. Berlin 1916.
- Hans Haustein: Die sozialhygienische Betätigung der Landesversicherungsanstalten, dargestellt am Beispiel der Landesversicherungsanstalt der Hansestädte. Leipzig 1919.
- Hans Haustein: Geschlechtskrankheiten und Prostitution in Skandinavien. Berlin 1925.
- Hans Haustein: Zur sexuellen Hygiene in Sowjet-Russland. Bonn 1926.
- Hans Haustein: Die Geschlechtskrankheiten einschließlich der Prostitution. In: Adolf Gottstein (Hrsg.): Handbuch der Sozialen Hygiene und Gesundheitsfürsorge. Berlin 1926.
- Hans Haustein und Hugo Hecht: Soziale Bedeutung, Bekämpfung, Statistik der Geschlechtskrankheiten. In Josef Jadassohn (ed.): Handbuch der Haut- und Geschlechtskrankheiten. Vol. 22, Berlin 1927.
- Hans Haustein: Die Frühgeschichte der Syphilis. Berlin 1930.
