= IBZ Berlin =

Scientists center

Coordinates: 52.4731°N 13.3158°E

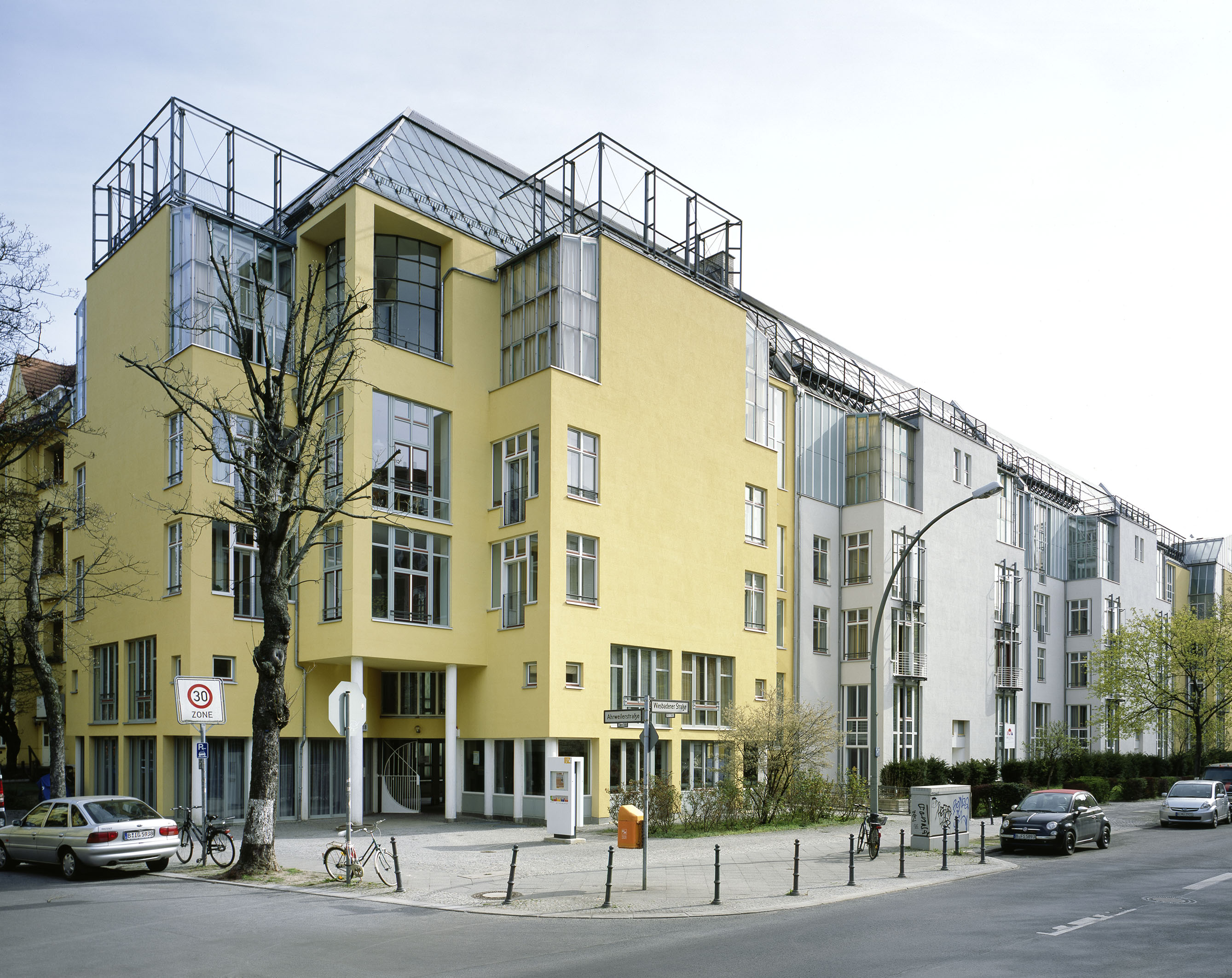
IBZ Berlin

The Internationale Begegnungszentrum der Wissenschaft (International Meeting Centre of Science - IBZ Berlin) is a residential building for both international scientists at the Free University of Berlin and the Max Planck Society and fellows of the Alexander von Humboldt Foundation. It is located at the Wiesbadener Straße in Berlin Wilmersdorf. The IBZ Berlin is a founding member of the Network of the Internationale Begegnungszentren der Wissenschaft, an association of international guesthouses (IBZs) and university-related guesthouses in Germany. The 25 million Marks (roughly 23 million Euros at purchase power parity) used to fund the IBZ, have been generously provided by the Alexander von Humboldt Foundation, the Volkswagen Foundation and the Land Berlin. Between 2010 and 2011 the building was renovated with the financial support of the Federal Ministry of Education and Research, and the Alexander von Humboldt Foundation.

As well as being managed by the Freie Universitat Berlin and the Max Planck Society, the company is also being managed by smaller institutions and individuals. The main aim of the IBZ is to promote the communication of ideas between international scientists and their German colleagues, on both, a scientific, and an artistic level. For this purpose, the association organises numerous lectures, concerts and seminars for residents and guests.

== History ==
The idea of international meeting centers for German and foreign scientists was developed in the 1950s by the Alexander von Humboldt foundation, which wanted to adapt American models of on-campus academics. A key feature of many American models is their close proximity to the main university campuses, an idea that Berlin was yet to emulate. One of the residential areas belonging to the Land Berlin was located several kilometers away from the campus on a former allotment, near Dahlem subway station - where most institutions of the Free University are located. Since key facilities for visiting scientists such as large meeting rooms were not available close to the university, the IBZ chose to develop the buildings in order to solve this problem.

== Architecture ==
The building was designed by Otto Steidle, an architect from Munich. The building consists of 78 apartments of varied sizes, and at first seems like a typical Berlin tenement house. However, on closer look, several more distinctive characteristics can be found, for example communal social rooms; these features are what make the IBZ such a unique place to live. There are numerous social areas, ranging from meeting rooms, a club room on the ground floor, a library, a gym, a billiard room, to a large hall on the top floor; of course there are also necessary living facilities such as communal kitchens available to all residents. The 78 apartments in Berlin IBZ are as follows:

- 17 single apartments with 38-47 sqm
- 19 two-room apartments with 48-57 sqm
- 11 three-room apartments with 64-77 sqm
- 30 four-room apartments with 86-116 sqm
- 1 five-room apartment with 115 sqm

The smaller apartments and studios are located in the front of the house at the Ahrweiler Straße. There are three communal kitchens to be used and shared by all residents - especially those who are living on their own.

Steidle's belief was that "It is not the house that determines the city, but the city determines the house" Accordingly, he developed the building out of the surroundings of the Rüdesheimer square in the Rheingau neighbourhood. Steidle wanted to ensure that the house fits in with the surrounding areas without compromising any of the opportunities that an entirely new building could offer.

== The architectural competition ==
In 1978 an architectural competition was held. Prominent architects such as Erich Schneider-Wessling, Gottfried Böhm, the Swiss architect Hans Müller, the architectural historian Julius Posener and publicist Rolf Rave were all part of the adjudication board. Architects such as Hinrich Baller, Winnetou Kampmann, Manfred Schiedhelm and the Planungskollektiv No. 1 were also invited to take part.

The predetermined and largely realized plan provided 78 apartments, with 16 single-bedroom, 19 two-bedroom, 12 three-bedroom, 28 four-bedroom and 3 five-bedroom apartments. One third of the apartments should be able to be combined with others in order to form larger spaces for families and larger groups. There are many communal areas such as a hall, 2 club rooms and kitchens. There is also an underground car park for resident's use. The IBZ also bears a strong focus on the conservation of energy beyond that which is required by law.

Steidle was praised both for the principles of his design and for his innovative view on how the historical architecture could be simultaneously preserved and updated. Steidle's winning design was also praised for its side stairway and for the resulting floor plans. The communal rooms have been recognized as being essential for such building projects, although the surface figures were exceeded at the IBZ Berlin: "Urbanity can be defined as an independent relationship and interaction between public and private spheres. For this interaction the boundary regions, the transition regions from own space to public space, from the individual to the collective are of particular importance. The allocation of living and developmental areas with their boundaries and transitions and their design and functional training determine the communicative character of the building." However, the architects were asked to revise their plans due to the lack of an additional staircase.

The diagonal, covered stairway plays an essential role in bringing residents together, as it connects all sections and creates communal areas of the house. The way starts at the central courtyard entrance at Wiesbadener Straße where there is the rental office and former gallery space (now club) and leads to the entrance of the building all the way up to the fifth floor. Whilst all the apartments lie to one side of the stairway, to the other side there are additional communal areas such as a library and a gym.

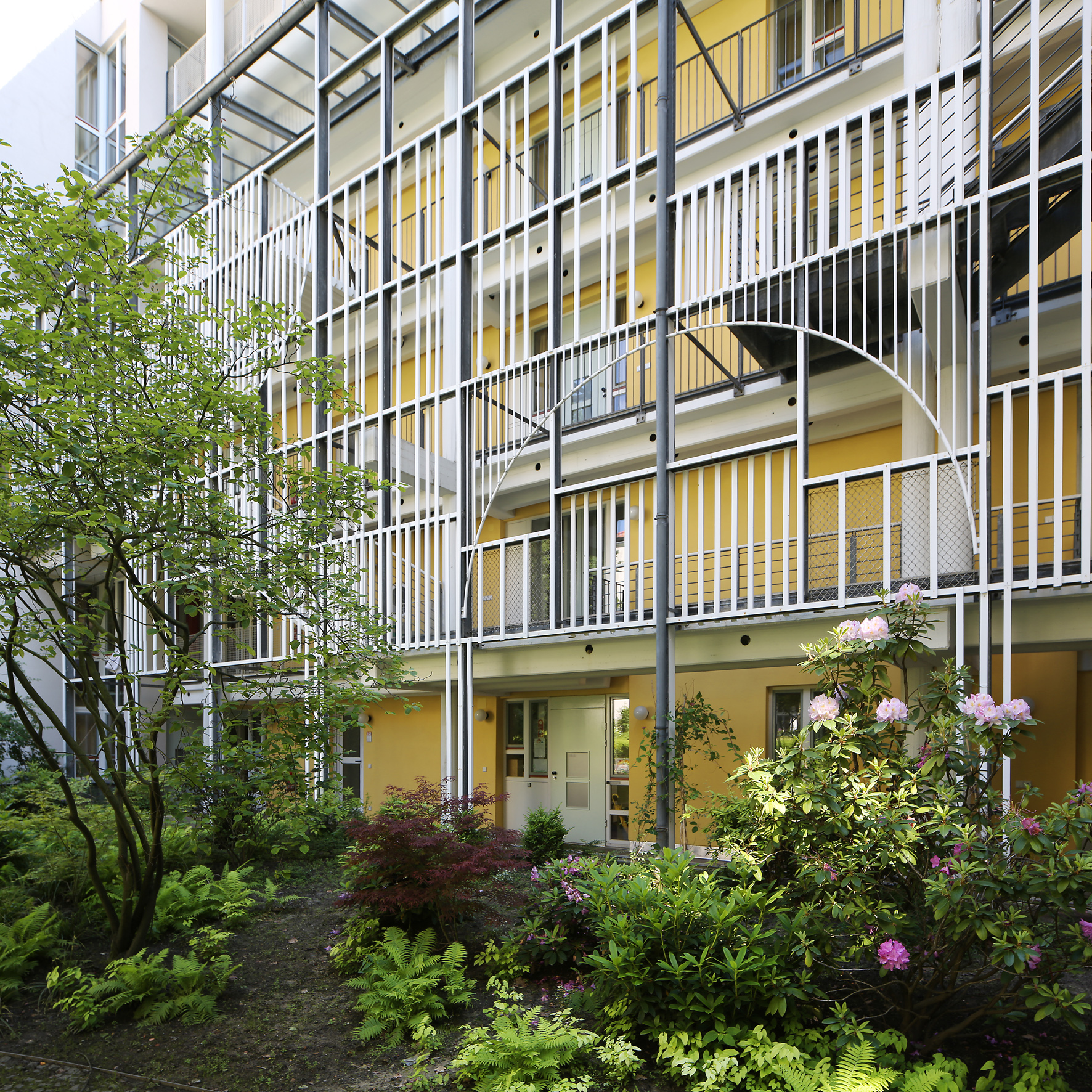
IBZ Berlin View of the courtyard Stairs

The shielded staircase offers a protected area for the residents; its framework was designed by the Berlin artist, Erich Wiesner, who also designed the colour concept for the building. With the staircase Steidle also designed space for interaction between the residents.

"Residential buildings are not only houses, but all structures that include qualities of living," says Steidle who directed his architecture, "against the purely functionalist and against an architecture of specific".

== The garden ==
The IBZ Berlin's garden was designed by Peter Latz, and consists of three main areas: the front gardens, the backyard garden and the roof garden. The front gardens reference the historical appearance of the Rüdesheimer Square. The same applies for the roadside trellis, which was however removed in the early 21st century and, according to the management, shall be rebuilt in a modified way with Erich Wiesner. The side entrances of the house are characterised by pairs of trees. The courtyard garden can be distinguished by the cobbled paths that run parallel and have, in part, been reshaped.

== Unfinished roof garden ==
The enormous glass roof of the IBZ was conceived as a community roof garden and should also be open to the neighbourhood. With the roof garden the missing allotment should be compensated. Although there are terraces on both sides of the rooftop garden for residents' use, which were partly greened; the roof garden remained unfinished until today.

== Extraordinary floorplans ==
The unique floor plans of the building are a special feature. The open plan living rooms are very light and open and most have three south facing bay window. The bedrooms are smaller, but are connected to the living room with glass elements. The larger apartments also offer storage spaces. Whilst the layouts mirror American and Scandinavian models, the utilities within the apartments are more typical of those found in Berlin in the 1920s and the Berlin-Taut School. The design of the doors and windows, the glazed vestibules and the stairs in the maisonettes are highly reminiscent of the social housing of classical modernity of the Weimar Republic, which now recognized in Berlin as a World Heritage Site.

Although the decor and furnishings are largely the same in all apartments, the floorplans vary hugely, which makes each apartment individual; with this the individuality of each guest is emphasized within a democratic community. The conditions, according to the theoretical approach, are similar and prescribed. On the basis of the same conditions mature but individual personalities can thrive and develop. Unlike many other IBZs, the house offers a number of large apartments aimed at families. Since the founding of the house, the number of families living there is extremely high.

== Dispute over the allotment ==
The planned evacuation of the allotment was connected to protests. The owners had used the central plots for decades and even the local residents greatly appreciated the green spaces. The development of the allotment was only possible because the land is located in one of the few areas in Rheingau neighbourhood that both remained undeveloped after the founding of the residential area and belongs to the Land Berlin. The effects of the two World Wars had always prevented the sale and development of the area.
