= Maria von Maltzan =

German resistance member an aristocrat

Maria von Maltzan

Maria Helene Françoise Izabel Gräfin von Maltzan, Freiin zu Wartenberg und Penzlin (German: [ma.ˈʁiːa fɔn mal.ˈt͡saːn]; 25 March 1909 – 12 November 1997) was an aristocrat who, as part of the German Resistance against Adolf Hitler and the Nazi party, saved the lives of many Jewish people in Berlin.

== Biography ==
Countess Maria von Maltzan was born into a wealthy noble family at Militsch Palace, Silesia, Germany (today Milicz, Poland) and was raised on the family's 18,000 acres (7,300 ha) estate, the youngest of eight children. After completing grade school in Berlin in 1927, she decided to undertake studies in zoology at the University of Breslau, a rare occurrence for a girl during this time. Her family was strictly against the idea, but her teachers supported her and she got permission. In 1928, she enrolled in the Ludwig-Maximilians-Universität München where she received her doctorate in natural sciences five years later.

When the Nazis seized power in 1933, her sense of justice made her join different resistance movements against the Nazis almost immediately. For years, she worked as an underground-fighter. Due to her status and relation to numerous Nazi officers, von Maltzan was at first above suspicion. Maria von Maltzan's sister, Alix, was married to Field Marshal Walther von Reichenau. As the brutality of the Nazi Régime accelerated with murder, violence and terror, the seeds of their plan for the total extermination of the Jews dawned on Maria von Maltzan in all its horror - and she immediately decided to act. Back in Berlin since 1935, she always responded to calls for help and took the Jews into her own home, fed and protected them, right under the noses of the Gestapo. Due to her well-known political attitude, she had to get by with numerous jobs before she began studying veterinary medicine in 1940, graduating in 1943. Throughout the war, the Countess von Maltzan, in cooperation with the Swedish Church, provided a safe haven for more than 60 Jews, deserters, and forced labourers, arranging for them to escape to safety. She falsified official visas and other documents, and helped many Jews escape from Berlin in trucks that she often drove herself.

Before World War II, she got to know the Jewish author Hans Hirschel, the former editor of Das Dreieck, an avant-garde German literary journal founded in 1925. From 1942 to the end of the war, she sheltered Hirschel in a special hiding place inside a couch in the living room of her apartment in Wilmersdorf, thus saving his life at the peril of her own. Von Maltzan became pregnant with Hans's child. She later recalled how the newborn baby was placed in an incubator and the hospital was bombed. The electricity running the incubator stopped and the baby died. Shortly afterwards, she adopted two little girls from a children's camp.

After the war, von Maltzan married Hans Hirschel, but the marriage failed. They separated after two years, then remarried in 1972. During the post-war-years, Maria had many difficulties, but grateful Jews, who never forgot her heroism, helped her survive bitter years. Because of the horrors of the war, she became addicted to drugs and at times lost her approbation as a veterinarian. She later recalled how she was even brought to a psychiatric hospital, and had to scrub floors day after day to afford a living.

== Post-war life and legacy ==
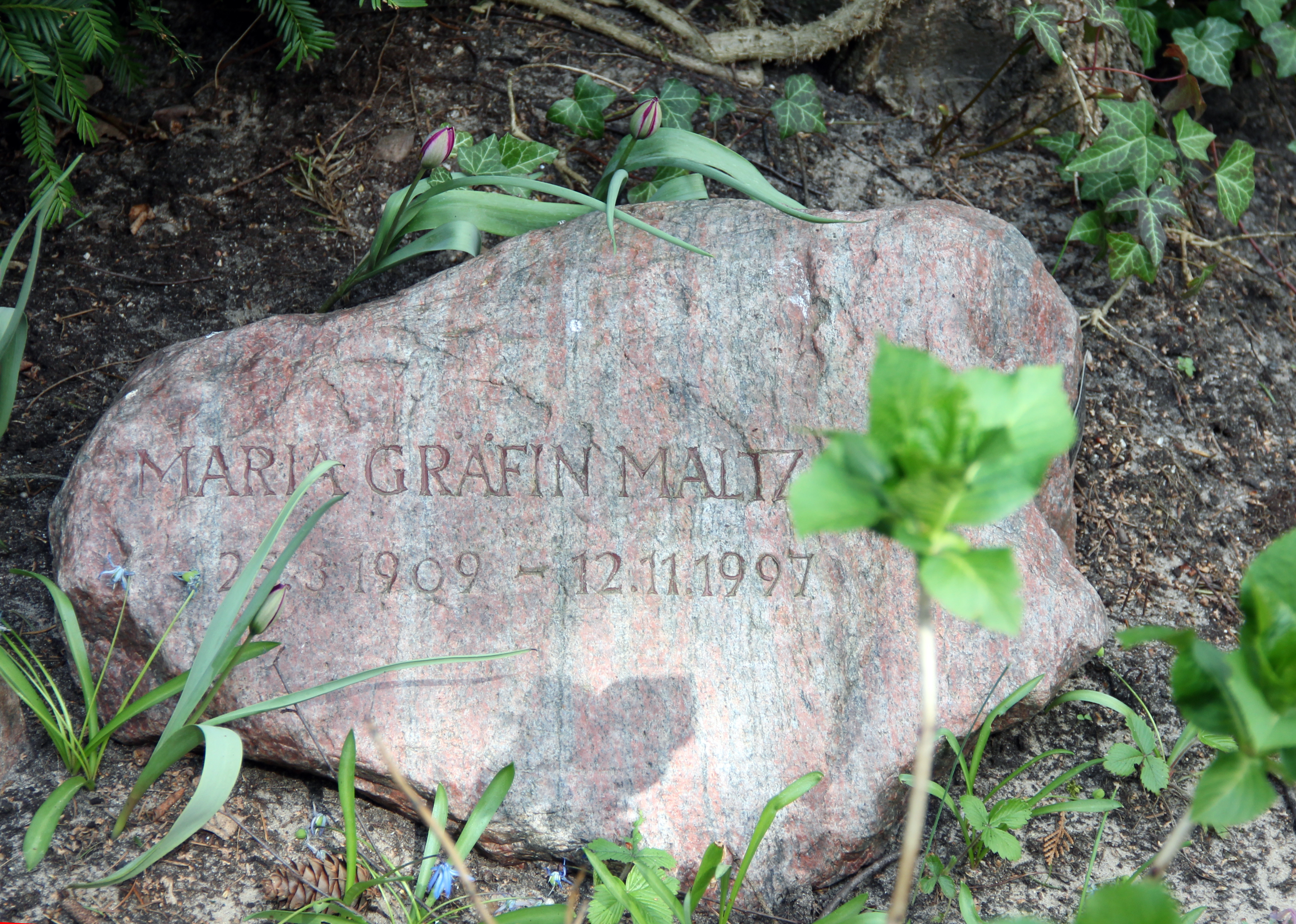
Maria Gräfin von Maltzan's gravestone in Berlin

After Hans Hirschel died in 1975, Countess Maria von Maltzan, aged 66, decided once again to build up a new existence with her own veterinary practice in Berlin beginning in 1981. Located in the Kreuzberg district, she became famous there for the cost-free treatment she gave to dogs owned by local punks and for her struggle for the improvement of the living conditions of immigrants. In 1986 she published her autobiography titled Beat the Drums and Be Without Fright, which made her life and work known to a wider public. She was granted the Righteous among the Nations award from the Israeli Government one year later. She died in Berlin in 1997.

== Additional information ==
- German Resistance
- Walther von Reichenau
- Gross, Leonard (1982). The Last Jews in Berlin. New York: Simon & Schuster. ISBN 0-671-24727-1.
