= Friedhof Wilmersdorf =

Cemetery in Berlin

Coordinates: 52°29′08″N 13°18′40″E

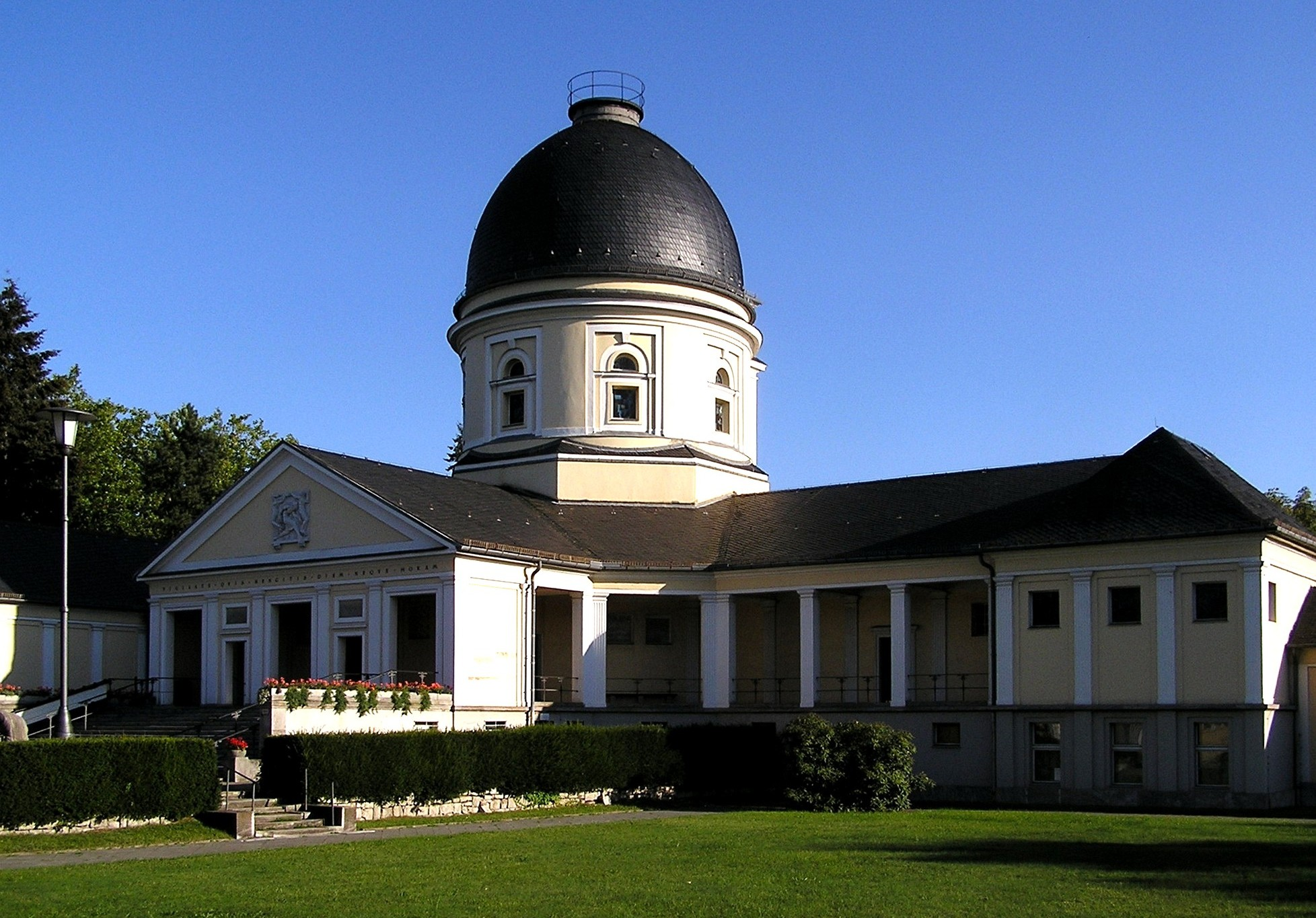
- The crematorium
- Interactive map of Friedhof Wilmersdorf

Details
- Established: 1885/6
- Location: Wilmersdorf
- Country: Germany
- Size: 10.12 hectares

The Friedhof Wilmersdorf is a state-owned cemetery in the Berlin district of Wilmersdorf. It is an avenue district cemetery that has existed since 1885/1886 and has been expanded several times. The current size is 10.12 hectares. The occupied areas A, B, and D are a registered garden monument of the State of Berlin.

When the cemetery was expanded to the northwest, a crematorium with extensive columbaria was built in the cemetery from 1919 to 1923. Cremations have not taken place here since 1990, but the mourning hall in the building is still used. The crematorium is a registered monument of the State of Berlin.
