= Power station Berlin-Wilmersdorf =

Power plant in Berlin, Germany

Coordinates: 52°28′49″N 13°18′29″E

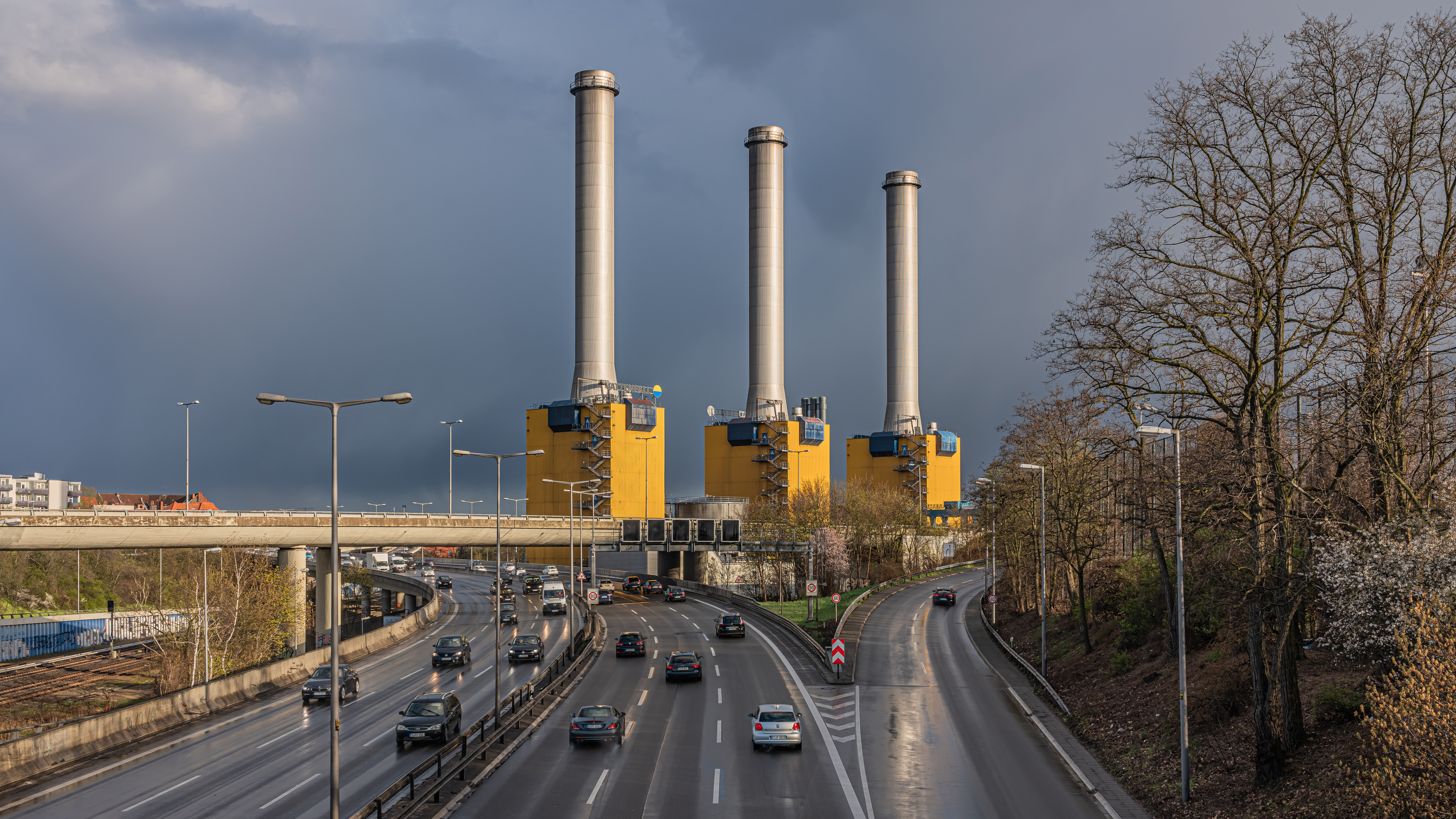
The chimneys of power station Berlin-Wilmersdorf

The power station Berlin-Wilmersdorf was a power plant in Berlin-Schmargendorf, which went into service in 1977, and has been shut down in 2021.

Construction of the facility, which belongs to the BEWAG, started in 1973.

At the time of construction, the three power engines are MS9001B gas turbines, manufactured in Belfort (France) by a cooperation between Alsthom and General Electric.

It has three blocks with a power of 110 megawatts, each equipped with a 102-metre-high (335 ft) chimney. This very striking facility received an architectural prize in the 1980s. It is not located near a river and therefore must take its cooling water from underground. There was an explosion on January 2, 1992, in one of the blocks. It is run by Vattenfall Europe, a subdivision of Vattenfall.

== See also ==
- List of power stations in Germany
