= German Medical Journal =

- Categories: Medicine
- Frequency: Three per year
- Publisher: Bennad Publishing House
- First issue: January 2007
- Country: Germany
- Language: Arabic-English and Russian-English
- Website: Journal homepage
- ISSN: 1869-7836

The German Medical Journal is an independent English-language magazine from Germany for an international medical community. With its digital edition and its bilingualism (Arabic–English and Russian–English), the magazine has a broad international circulation. The German Medical Journal is published by Bennad Ltd.

The magazine keeps readers up to date about the status of medicine; it presents innovations from diagnostics and therapy and lets selected specialists from the various medical fields have their say. The featured editorials are written by renowned specialists. The Advisory Board of the German Medical Journal consists of German university professors.

The German Medical Journal was established as an Arabic-English printed magazine. The first issue was published in January 2007. In 2009, the publishing house launched a digital edition. Since 2010, the journal has been published in Russian-English too. The magazine is financed by advertising and is completely independent. The German Medical Journal is aimed at physicians of all different disciplines.
