= Lilli Wislicenus =

German sculptor

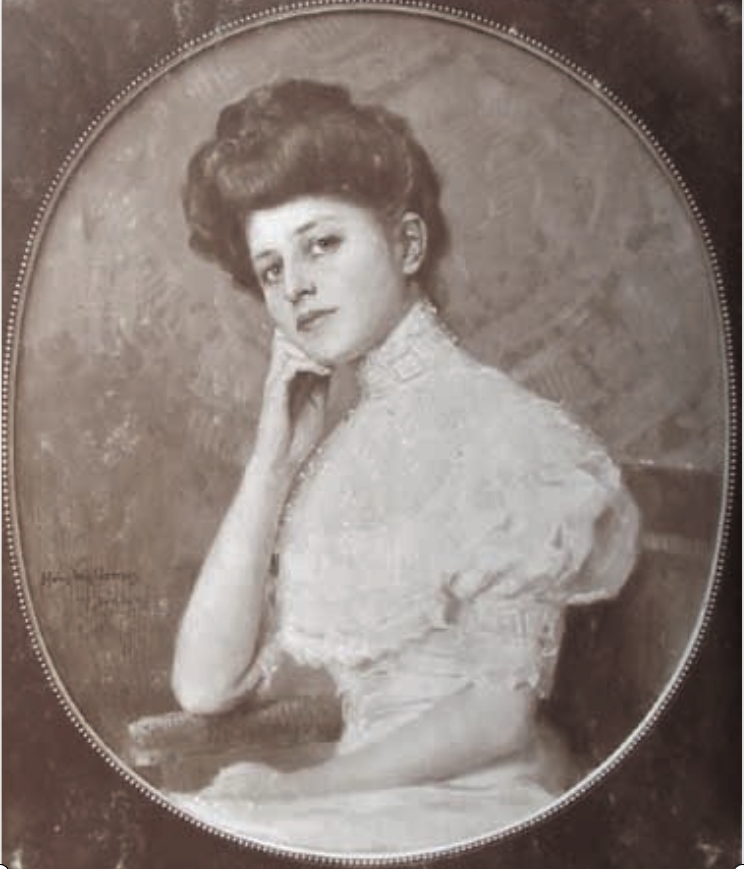
- Lilli Wislicenus-Finzelberg; portrait by her husband (1907)
- Born: Elisabeth Emma Charlotte Finzelberg; 5 November 1872; Andernach, Germany
- Died: 14 December 1939 (aged 67); Berlin
- Spouse: Hans Wislicenus (m. 1896)

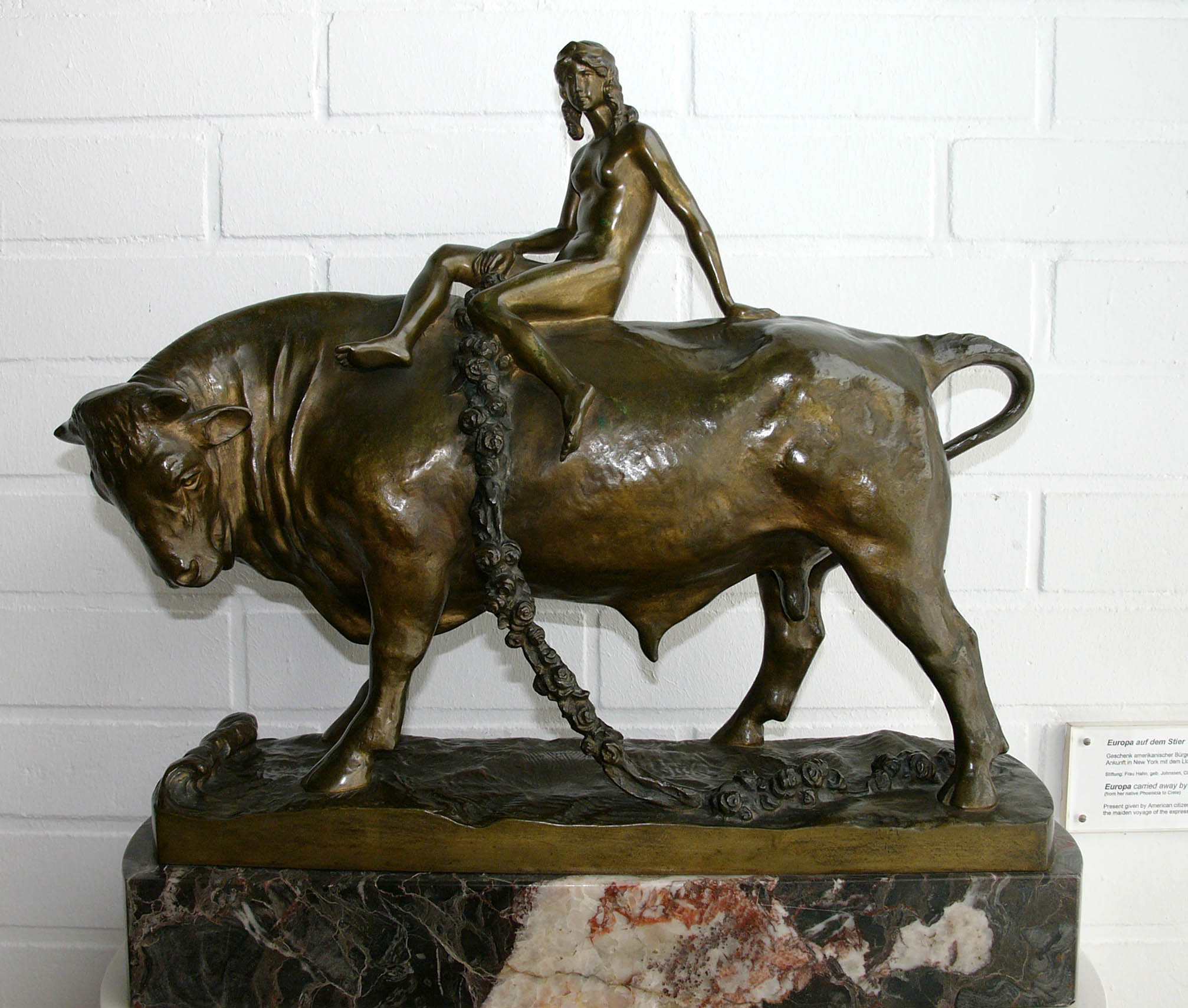
Europa Being Abducted by a Bull

Lilli Wislicenus, born Elisabeth Emma Charlotte Finzelberg (1872–1939) was a German sculptor.

== Biography ==
Wislicenus née Finzelberg was born in 1872 in Andernach. For a time she lived with her uncle, the painter Hermann Wislicenus in Duesseldorf. She attended the Königlich Technische Hochschule Charlottenburg (now Technische Universität Berlin).

She exhibited her work at the Woman's Building at the 1893 World's Columbian Exposition in Chicago, Illinois.

In 1896 she married her cousin, the German painter Hans Wislicenus (1864–1939).

Wislicenus died in 1939 in Berlin, Germany.

== Gallery ==
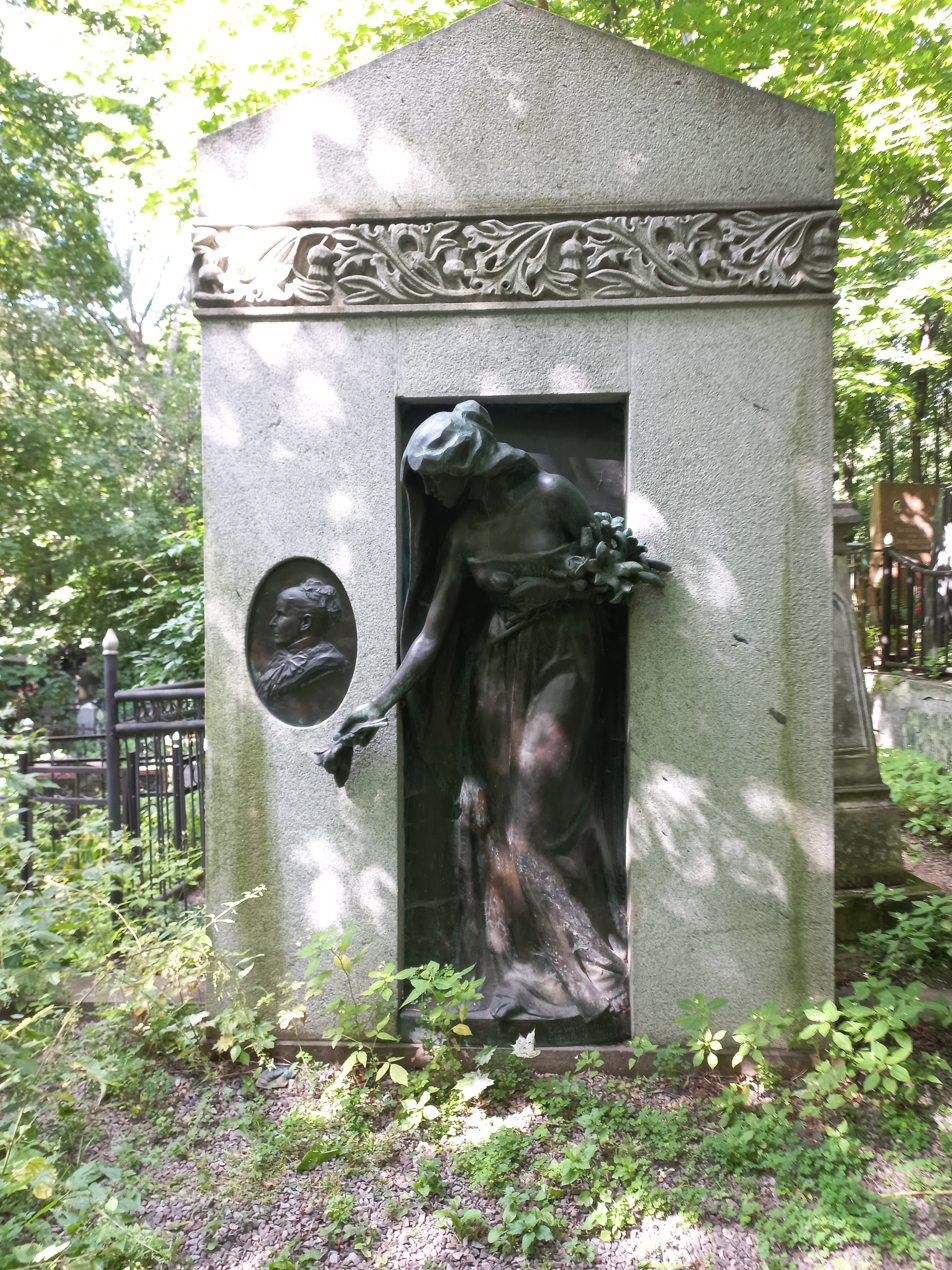
Sculpture on Vvedenskoye Cemetery, Moscow, Russia

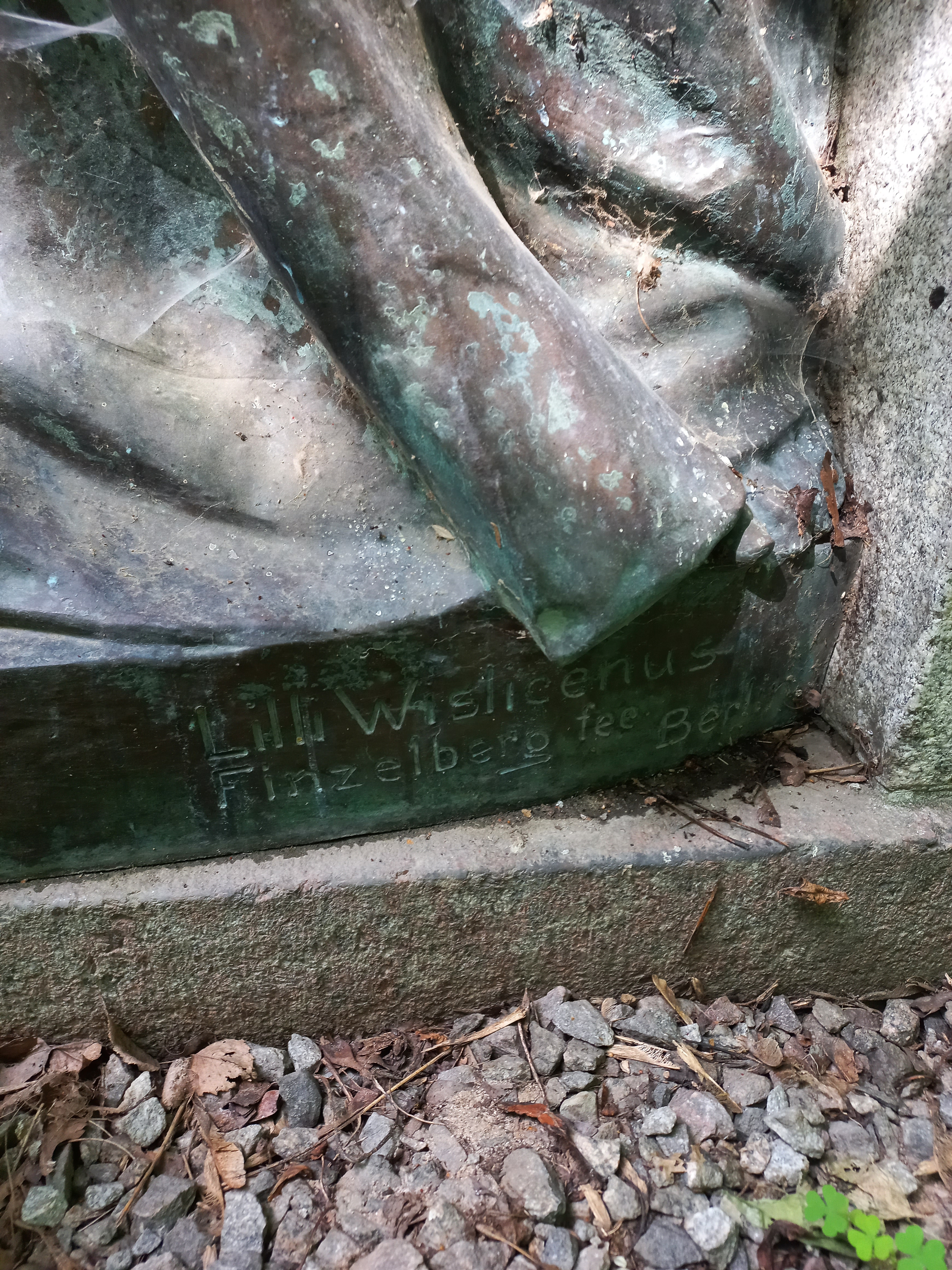
Mark on sculpture on Vvedenskoye Cemetery, Moscow, Russia

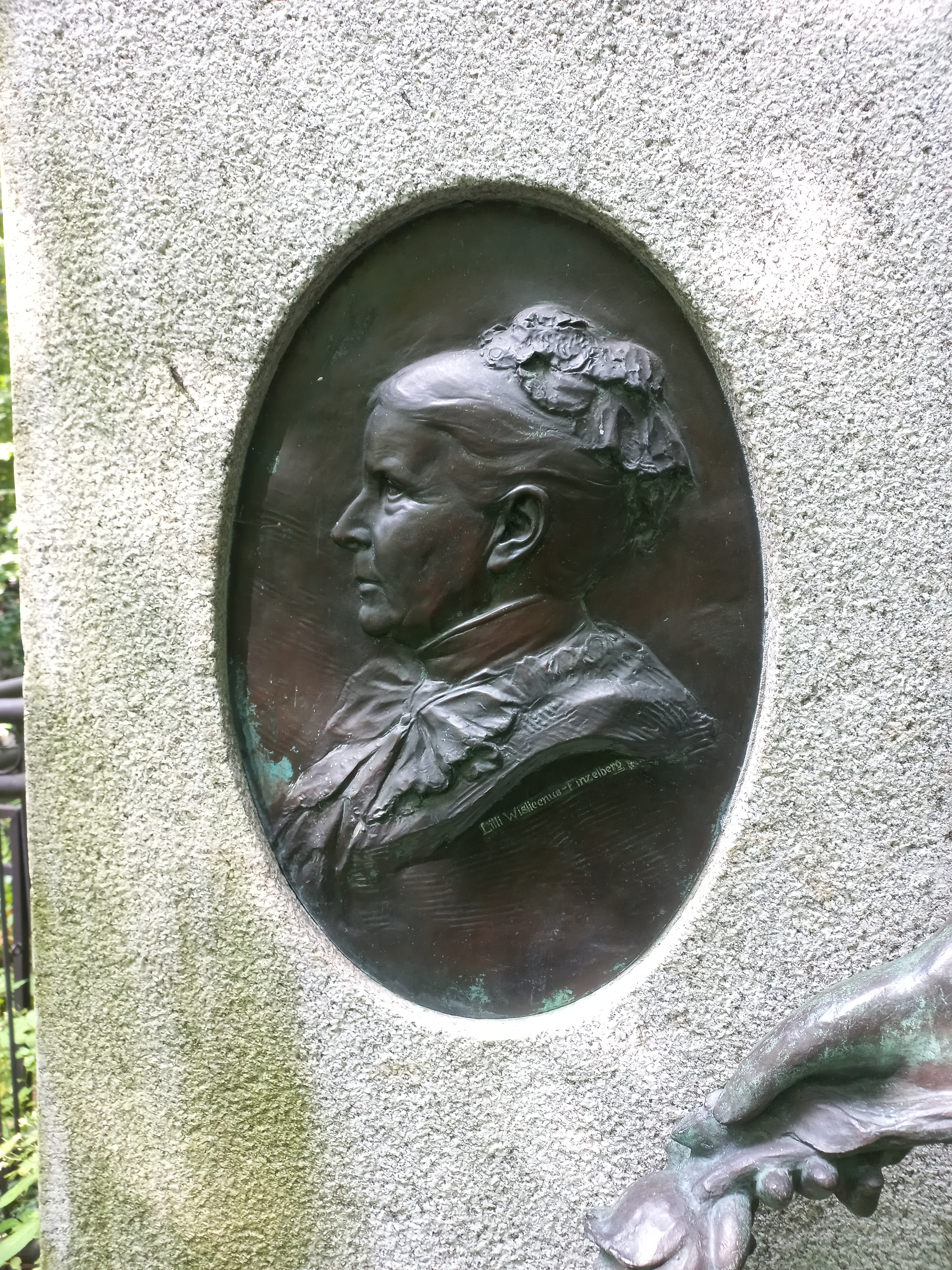
Portrait on the tombstone on Vvedenskoye Cemetery, Moscow, Russia

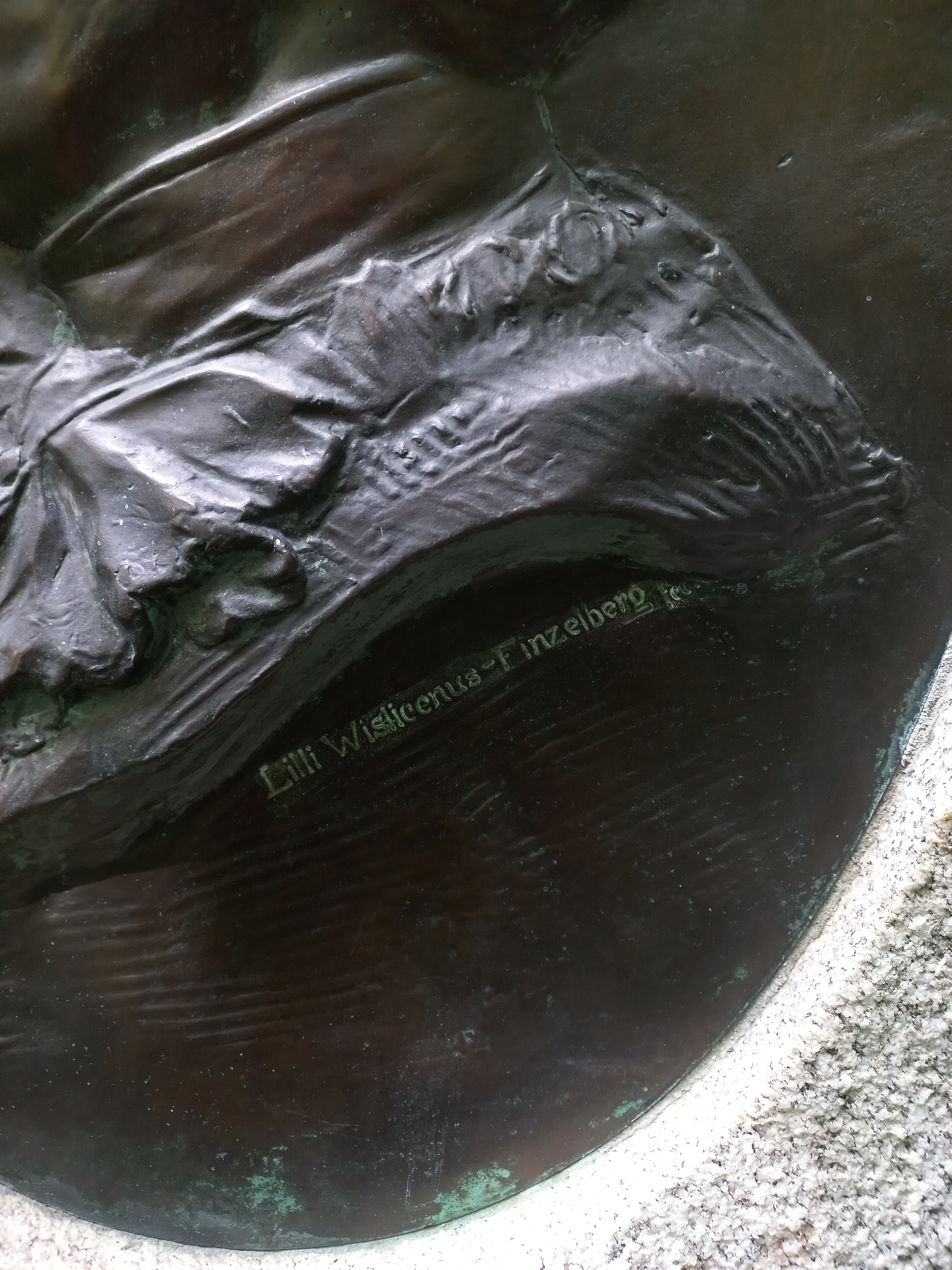
Mark on the portrait on Vvedenskoye Cemetery, Moscow, Russia
