= Arthur D. Nicholson =

United States Army officer (1947–1985)

- Born: 7 June 1947; Mount Vernon, Washington, US
- Died: 24 March 1985 (aged 37); Karstädt, East Germany
- Burial place: Arlington National Cemetery
- Military career
- Allegiance: United States
- Branch: United States Army
- Service years: 1970–1985
- Rank: Lieutenant colonel (posthumous promotion)
- Unit: United States Military Liaison Mission
- Conflicts: Cold War: Border Front (DOW)

Arthur D. Nicholson Jr. (7 June 1947 – 24 March 1985) was a United States Army military intelligence officer shot by a Soviet sentry while engaged in intelligence-gathering activities as part of an authorized military liaison mission which operated under reciprocal U.S.–Soviet authority.

Military liaison missions were liaisons between the British, French and U.S. forces and the Group of Soviet Forces in Germany (East Germany), but they had a known intelligence-gathering secondary mission and an important role to verify that offensive action was not being prepared. Reciprocal groups were authorized and operated by both the British, French and U.S. (in East Germany) and the Soviet Union (in West Germany) during the Cold War.

Nicholson is officially regarded by the U.S. Department of Defense as having been a victim of "murder" and the final "victim" of the Cold War. Nicholson's death led to a U.S.–Soviet crisis and intense negotiations regarding the military liaison missions.

== Career as intelligence officer ==
Nicholson was the son of a career navy officer. He graduated from Joel Barlow High School of Redding, Connecticut, in 1965 and earned a bachelor's degree from Transylvania University in 1969 before joining the U.S. Army in 1970.

Nicholson was commissioned as a military intelligence (MI) officer and served as a Battalion S-2 (officer in charge of the staff section responsible for intelligence products and analysis) with a missile battalion in Korea during 1973 and 1974. From 1974 to 1979, he served with MI units in Frankfurt am Main and Munich in the Federal Republic of Germany.

Following this, Nicholson became a foreign area officer. In 1980, he earned a master's degree in Soviet and East European studies from the Naval Postgraduate School and also attended a two-year course in the Russian language at the Defense Language Institute. From 1980 to 1982, Nicholson attended the U.S. Army's Russian Institute in Garmisch-Partenkirchen, Germany.

In 1982, Nicholson was assigned to the U.S. Military Liaison Mission (USMLM) to the Commander-in-Chief of the Group of Soviet Forces Germany. He was promoted to major in 1983.

== Death ==
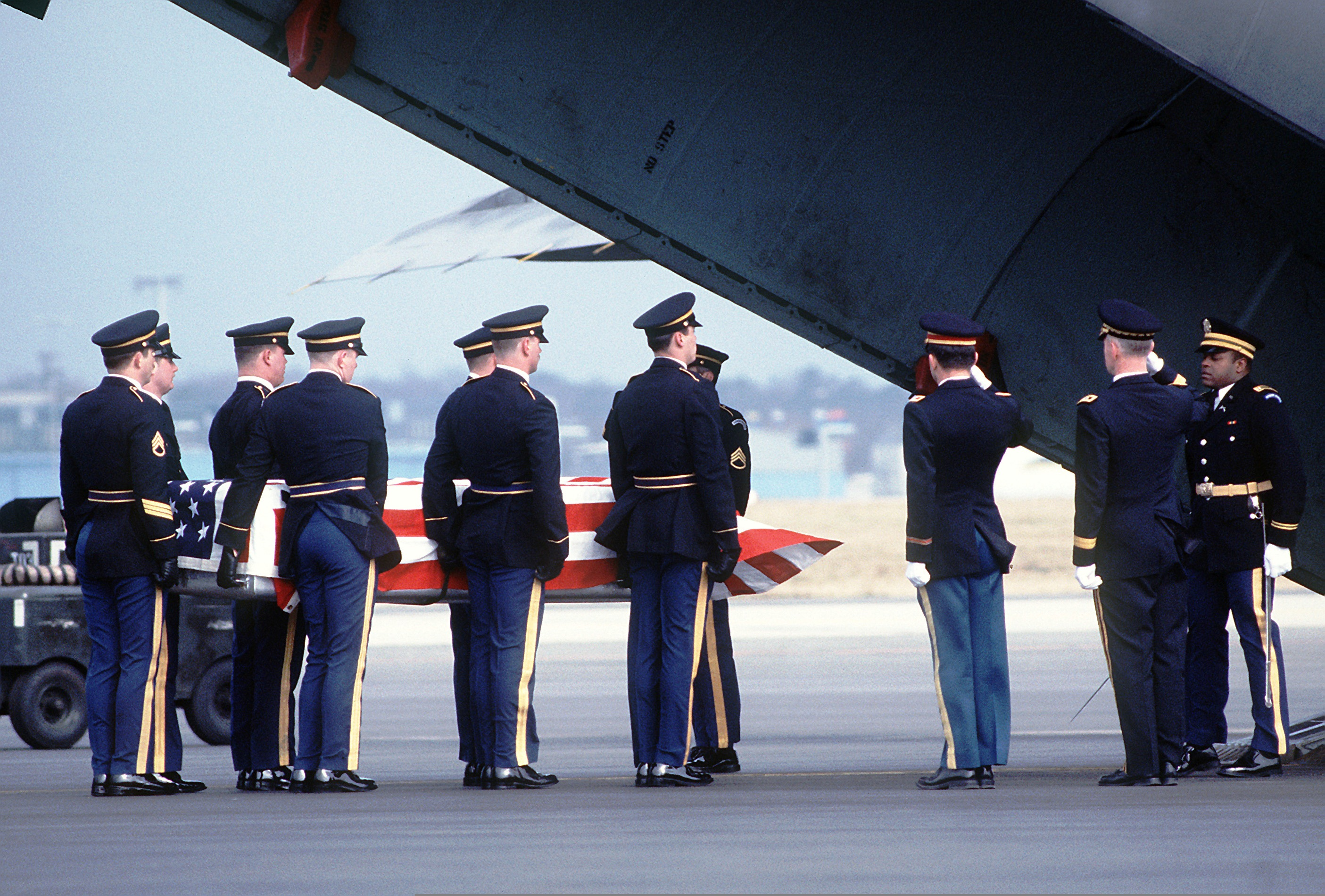
Major Nicholson's casket being placed on a U.S. aircraft at Rhein-Main Air Base in Germany.

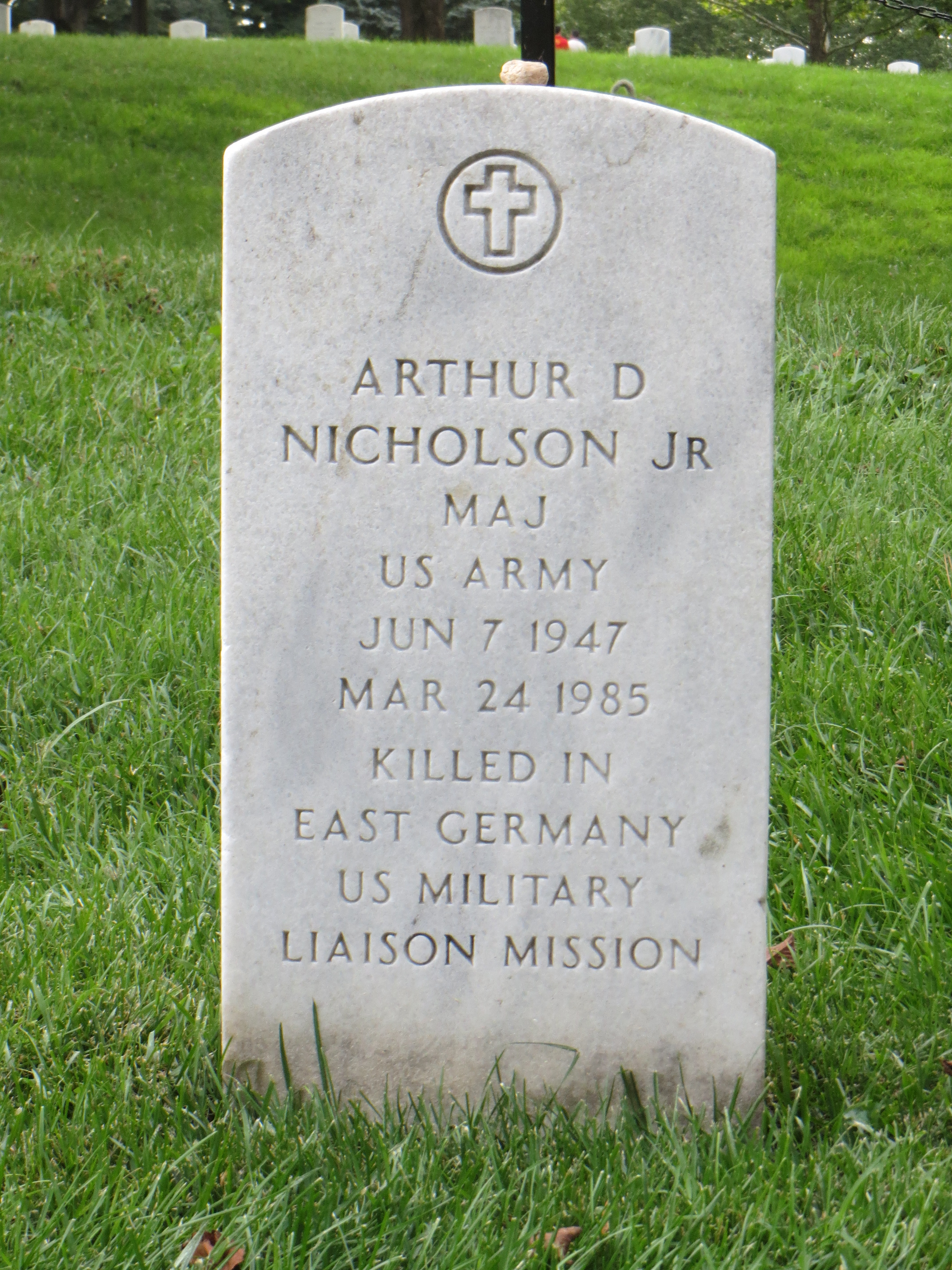
Grave at Arlington Cemetery

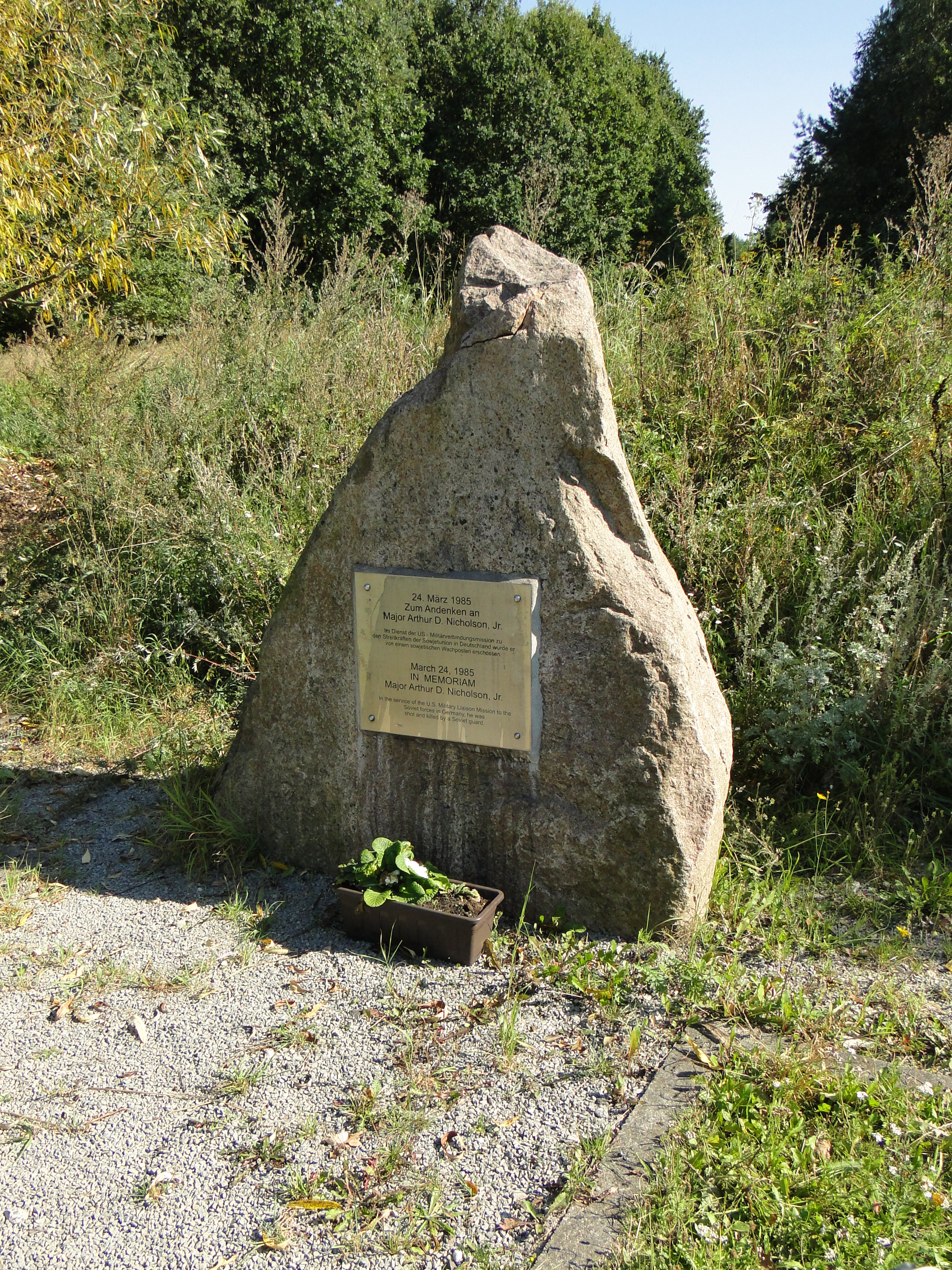
Memorial near Ludwigslust, Germany

On 24 March 1985, with Sergeant Jessie G. Schatz, Nicholson undertook his final mission for the USMLM. The mission was to photograph a Soviet tank storage building near Ludwigslust, some 160 kilometres (99 mi) northwest of Berlin. After approaching the Soviet facility covertly but legitimately through an adjacent forest, Nicholson stepped out of the vehicle and approached the building to photograph it while Sergeant Schatz maintained a watch for Soviet personnel.

Unseen by either man, Soviet Sergeant Aleksandr Ryabtsev covertly emerged from the forest and opened fire on the Americans. The first bullet narrowly missed Schatz, and another bullet struck Nicholson. After crying out that he had been hit, Nicholson fell to the ground. Attempting to go to Nicholson's aid, Schatz was halted by Ryabtsev at gunpoint and forced back into the USMLM vehicle.

Although the Soviets later claimed that Nicholson died instantly, an autopsy indicated that he had actually bled to death while on the ground.

Even as more senior Soviet personnel arrived, no medical aid for Nicholson was provided and no one checked his conditions for two hours after he was shot.

After an attempt by the Soviets to perform an autopsy of Nicholson and a demand by General Glenn K. Otis that they return the body, Nicholson's body was returned to the U.S. Army at the Glienicke Bridge in Berlin.

On 30 March 1985, Nicholson was buried at Arlington National Cemetery.

The Soviets contended that the response of Sergeant Ryabtsev, as a guard, had been appropriate in confronting an "unknown intruder who did not comply with the warnings of the sentry", and also stated that the area that Major Nicholson was in was "off-limits" to military liaison mission operations, as well as placing blame for the incident on the United States.

== Aftermath ==
At a subsequent meeting between General Otis and General Mikhail Zaitsev, the commander of Group of Soviet Forces in Germany, General Otis made it clear that the U.S. Army believed that Nicholson's murder was "officially condoned, if not directly ordered."

Following this, a Soviet diplomat was ordered out of the U.S. and the U.S. canceled plans to jointly celebrate the 40th anniversary of the end of the Second World War in Europe with the Soviets.

The incident was also the first major foreign policy crisis faced by Mikhail Gorbachev as leader of the Soviet Union. The relatively muted U.S. response drew criticism from various sources, among them George Will.

Further negotiations over the shooting resulted in the Soviets issuing instructions to their personnel that the use of force or weapons against Allied military liaison personnel was strictly forbidden, but in 1987, another incident took place in which Soviet soldiers fired at USMLM personnel, one of whom was wounded.

In 1988, Soviet defense minister Dmitry Yazov officially apologized for the death of Major Nicholson to U.S. defense secretary Frank C. Carlucci at a summit conference in Moscow.

Nicholson Hall, located at the United States Army Intelligence Center in Fort Huachuca, Arizona, is named in his honor.
