= Theodor Hahn =

German hydrotherapist, naturopath, and vegetarian activist

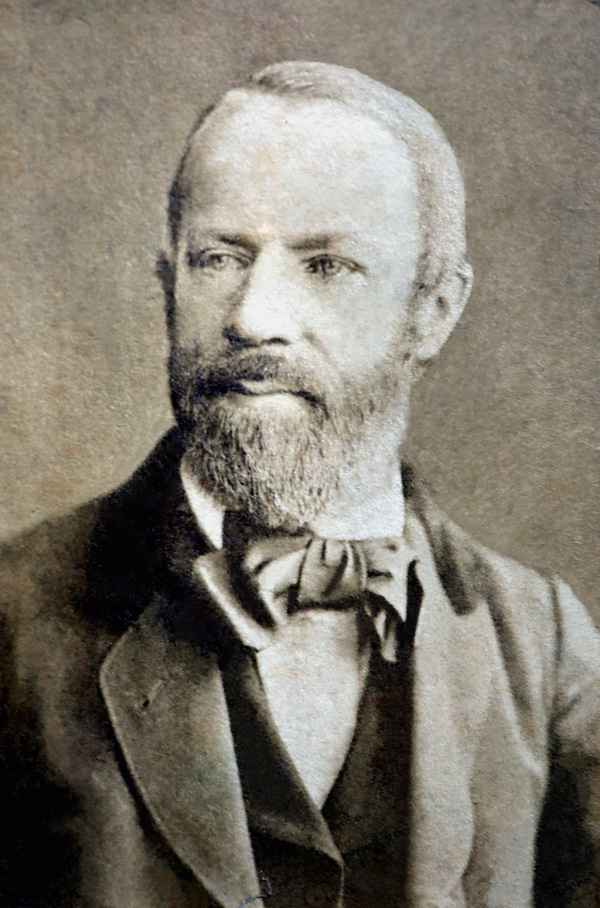
- Born: May 19, 1824 19 May 1824; Ludwigslust, Grand Duchy of Mecklenburg-Schwerin
- Died: 3 March 1883 (aged 58); Tablat, St. Gallen, Switzerland
- Occupations: Naturopath, hydrotherapist, writer, activist

Theodor Hahn (19 May 1824 – 3 March 1883) was a German hydrotherapist, naturopath, writer, and vegetarianism activist.

== Biography ==
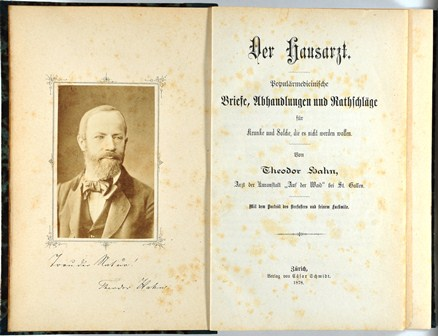
Hahn's Der Hausarzt, 1878

Theodor Hahn was born at Ludwigslust, Grand Duchy of Mecklenburg-Schwerin. He was influenced by the hydrotherapy of his cousin J. H. Rausse and started his own water cure therapy in October, 1847. He worked with Rausse until his death in 1848 at a water cure institution in Alexandersbad.

Hahn was one of the first to use the term "Naturheilkunde" (Nature Cure). In 1850, he managed Buchenthal water cure in Canton of St. Gallen, Switzerland. In 1852, he became director of Tiefenau water cure in Canton of Zürich. Hahn completed the second and third part of Rausse's book Instructions for the Use of Water Cure during 1851–1852. In the early 1850s Hahn gave up alcohol, coffee, meat and spices.

Hahn operated a naturopathic sanatorium Auf der Waid in Oberwaid near St. Gallen from 1862. Medical Historian Karl Eduard Rothschuh commented that Hahn "started out exclusively with the water cure but with his addition of dietetics and vegetarianism to nature cure, he pushed its influence into the beginning of the health and life reform movement." Hahn was influenced by Christoph Wilhelm Hufeland's book Makrobiotik and began to prescribe to his patients a lacto-vegetarian diet from 1852 that consisted of whole wheat bread, milk and uncooked vegetables. Hahn's vegetarianism influenced Eduard Baltzer, Richard Wagner and many others.

Hahn's Die naturgemässe Diät ("The Natural Diet") in 1859 argued against the meat-based diet that was promoted by Jacob Moleschott, Gabriel Valentin and others. He argued for a meatless diet and provided evidence of its physiological benefits, including longevity and physical strength. In 1865, Hahn authored a bestseller Das Paradies der Gesundheit, das verlorene und das wiedergefundene ("The Paradise of Health, the Lost One, and the One Regained"). Hahn also opposed animal vivisection.

Hahn died from colon cancer on 3 March 1883.

== Selected publications ==
- Die naturgemässe Diät: die Diät der Zukunft (1859)
- Das Paradies der Gesundheit, das verlorene und das wiedergefundene (1865)
- Praktische Handbuch der Naturgemässen Heilweise (1865)
- Der Naturarzt (1870)
- Der Hausarzt (1878)

== See also ==
- Eduard Baltzer
- Wilhelm Zimmermann
