= Wolfgang Uwe Eckart =

German medical historian (1952–2021)

Wolfgang U. Eckart
- Born: Wolfgang Uwe Eckart; 7 February 1952; Schwelm, West Germany
- Died: 16 August 2021 (aged 69); Heidelberg, Germany
- Awards: Order of Merit of the Federal Republic of Germany (2016)

Academic background
- Education: University of Münster
- Academic advisors: Richard Toellner, Karl Eduard Rothschuh

Academic work
- Discipline: History of medicine
- Institutions: Hannover Medical School; Heidelberg University
- Notable works: Geschichte, Theorie und Ethik der Medizin

Wolfgang Uwe Eckart (7 February 1952 - 16 August 2021) was a German medical historian. For 25 years he directed the Institute for the History and Ethics of Medicine at Heidelberg University, and his survey Geschichte, Theorie und Ethik der Medizin became a standard German textbook in the field.

== Life and career ==
Eckart studied medicine, history and philosophy at the University of Münster. As a student he was active on the political left, in the Socialist University League (Sozialistischer Hochschulbund) and the Marxist Student Union Spartacus, and in 1973-74 he served as the league's cultural officer in the university student union. He qualified as a physician in 1977 and took his Dr. med. a year later with a dissertation on the Wittenberg physician Daniel Sennert. He remained in Münster until 1988, working at the Institute for the Theory and History of Medicine and qualifying as a Privatdozent in 1986. The same year he completed his habilitation with a study of German doctors in Japan and China, which he wrote while serving as a medical officer at the Military History Research Office in Freiburg. His teachers included Richard Toellner and Karl Eduard Rothschuh.

In 1988 Eckart became the first professor of the history of medicine at Hannover Medical School. He moved to Heidelberg University in 1992 to head its Institute for the History of Medicine - today the Institute for the History and Ethics of Medicine - and stayed there until his retirement in 2017. He was president of the Society for the History of Science (Gesellschaft für Wissenschaftsgeschichte) from 1996 to 1998, and was elected to the Leibniz Society of Sciences in 2002 and the German Academy of Sciences Leopoldina in 2009. In 2016 he received the Cross of Merit on Ribbon of the Order of Merit of the Federal Republic of Germany.

His work ranged widely: Byzantine medicine, the rise of modern medicine in the 16th and 17th centuries, medicine in literature, and medicine under colonialism, in wartime, and in German politics between 1871 and 1945. He wrote extensively on medicine under National Socialism. After retiring he turned mainly to the Leopoldina, and in his final years he was a frequent media voice placing the COVID-19 pandemic in historical context. Eckart died in Heidelberg in August 2021, aged 69, after a long illness the medical historian Karen Nolte succeeded him in the Heidelberg chair.

== Awards and honours ==
- Member of the German Academy of Sciences Leopoldina (2009)
- Cross of Merit on Ribbon of the Order of Merit of the Federal Republic of Germany (2016)

== Selected works ==
- Geschichte der Medizin. Springer, Berlin 1990; 9th revised edition published 2021 as Geschichte, Theorie und Ethik der Medizin, ISBN 978-3-662-63424-0.
- Medizin und Kolonialimperialismus. Deutschland 1884-1945. Schöningh, Paderborn 1997, ISBN 3-506-72181-X.
- with Robert Jütte: Medizingeschichte. Eine Einführung. Böhlau, Cologne 2007 (2nd ed. 2014), ISBN 978-3-8252-2903-0.
- Illustrierte Geschichte der Medizin. Von der Französischen Revolution bis heute. Springer, Berlin 2011, ISBN 978-3-642-12609-3.
- Medizin in der NS-Diktatur. Ideologien, Praxis, Folgen. Böhlau, Vienna 2012, ISBN 978-3-412-20847-9.
- Medizin und Krieg. Deutschland 1914-1924. Schöningh, Paderborn 2014, ISBN 978-3-506-75677-0.
