= BRIXMIS =

British Cold War military liaison mission

BRIXMIS emblem

The British Commanders'-in-Chief Mission to the Soviet Forces in Germany (BRIXMIS) was a military liaison mission which operated behind the Iron Curtain in East Germany during the Cold War.

BRIXMIS existed from 1946 – shortly after the end of the Second World War – until the eve of the reunification of Germany in 1990. Created by an agreement to exchange military missions, the stated object of BRIXMIS – and SOXMIS, the Soviet equivalent in the British Zone – was "to maintain Liaison between the staff of the two Commanders-in-Chief and their Military Governments in the Zones".

This liaison was undertaken by 31 members – 11 officers and no more than 20 others – appointed to each mission. These liaison staff were issued passes allowing freedom of travel and circulation, with the exception of certain restricted areas, within each other's zone. Such "tours", as they became known, were conducted in uniform and in clearly identifiable vehicles. Nevertheless, although never openly stated, this liaison role also presented an ideal opportunity for the gathering of military intelligence through reconnaissance and surveillance and the occasional theft of military matériel. This opportunity was fully exploited by both sides.

BRIXMIS was ideally placed to "test the temperature" of Soviet intentions from its privileged position behind the Iron Curtain. However, and perhaps more importantly, it offered a channel for communication between West and East via its secondary but significant role of liaison – the initial reason for its establishment.

== History ==
Following the establishment of the four Allied zones of control across Germany after the Second World War, it became clear that some mechanism was needed to facilitate liaison between the occupying military governments, particularly between those of the Western Allies and the Soviet Union. The exchange of military liaison missions appeared to offer a convenient solution.

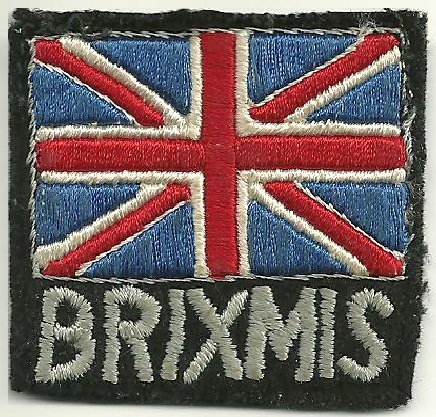
Flash badge worn on the upper arm by uniformed BRIXMIS personnel

The reciprocal agreement establishing the first of these, between the British and Soviet zones − the Robertson—Malinin Agreement − was reached on 16 September 1946 between the respective chiefs of staff. Subsequent agreements in 1947 led to the exchange of similar military liaison missions between the Soviet zone and those controlled by French and US forces, although the British—Soviet arrangement was significantly larger than either of the others, with 31 individuals allowed passes in each case. (Note: The terms of the Noiret-Malinin Agreement allowed the French Mission to hold 18 passes, and the Huebner-Malinin Agreement restricted the US to just 14.)

The British Mission comprised members of the British Army, Royal Navy, and Royal Air Force who conducted uniformed liaison activities in marked cars and in two de Havilland Chipmunk light aircraft − the latter ostensibly to allow aircrew to maintain crew currency while posted to the Mission.

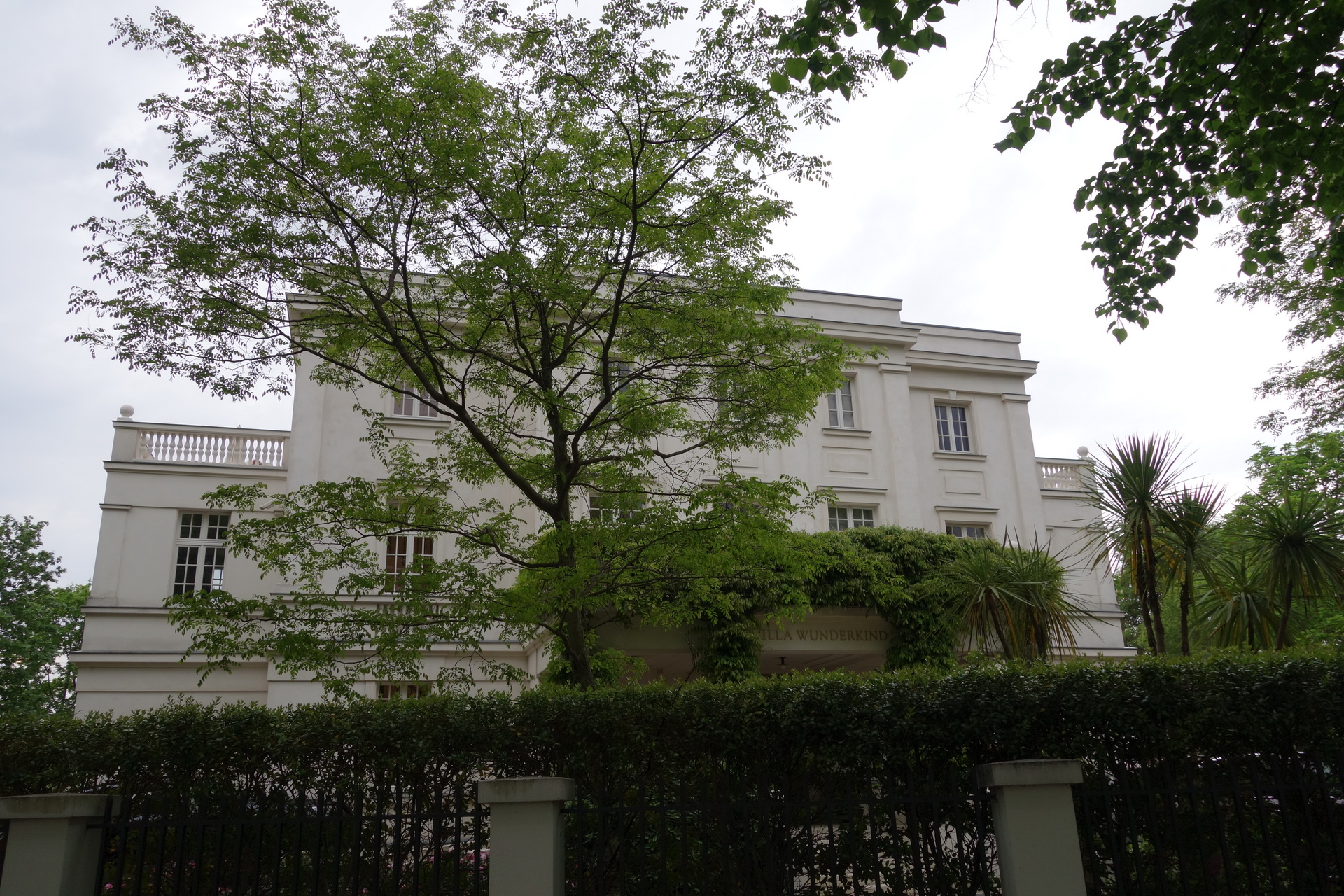
The former residence from 1958–1990 in Potsdam in 2014

BRIXMIS maintained a permanent presence in its nominal home, the Mission House in Potsdam, East Germany, but its actual headquarters and operational centre were in West Berlin. These were located in London Block, a part of the Olympic Stadium complex which housed the military government of the British Sector of Berlin. The original Potsdam Mission House at Wildpark was in fact damaged during anti-British disturbances in 1958, and a new one (34 Seestrasse, near the Glienicke Bridge) was provided by the Soviet authorities, together with a sum of money in reparation. Although symbolically highly significant, the fall of the Berlin Wall in 1989 simply returned the situation to what it had been before its erection in 1961, and the need for liaison and the gathering of intelligence became no less pressing. The agreements therefore remained in place until 2 October 1990, when all three were suspended on the eve of Germany's reunification.

While BRIXMIS formally disbanded on 31 December 1990, a small number of its staff remained to conduct similar operations covertly and without the quasi-diplomatic immunity of the Robertson-Malinin Agreement during the course of the next three years. The rationale for this 'son-of-BRIXMIS' unit is as curious as the paradox of the liaison-spying roles of the previous 45 years. In 1990, the fact remained that the West could not be certain that the Soviet Union would fully withdraw from the now united Germany.

== Liaison ==
Other than via the occasional formal message, most official liaison consisted of formal events attended by both sides. Such events included, for example, a parade on the Queen's birthday, receptions at the Mission House, and a Remembrance Day religious service at the Stahnsdorf War Graves cemetery, just south of Berlin. There were also regular wreath-laying visits to the British memorials at the former concentration camps of Buchenwald, Sachsenhausen, and Ravensbrück.

Informal contact was maintained through parties – usually in celebration of some one-off event – to which members of SERB, the Soviet External Relations Branch, (Note: SERB controlled the issue of passes and was responsible for the maintenance of the Mission House in Potsdam. It also acted as the clearing house and point of contact for all official business between the Chief of BRIXMIS and the Soviet armed forces.) were also invited.

Members of the Mission holding a full "touring"’ pass could also go on what were known as "cultural tours", in which tourers and their families could stay, usually for several nights, in hotels of some of the main cities of East Germany. Such trips offered excellent opportunities for getting to know members of the Soviet and East German armed forces (and civilians) who might not have otherwise been met in the course of normal duties.

== Intelligence gathering ==
The liaison agreement allowed staff to travel throughout the respective zones of control with only limited restrictions on movement. Some areas remained permanently restricted, whereas others were subject to temporary restriction, with processes established to notify respective missions when these were imposed. (Note: The reasons for the imposition of temporary restrictions were always of great interest, and means were found to ensure that those already out on tour could be informed of their whereabouts whilst still being able to deny having had the chance to be told about them.)

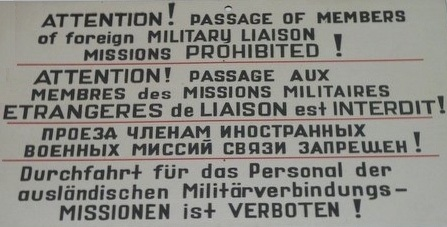
Typical sign intended to prevent Missions from entering prohibited areas in East Germany

Whilst these were to a large extent respected, there were also many unnotified "Missions prohibited" signs around most military installations, which were invariably ignored and rather used as indicators of where to go − with these signs either being stolen as souvenirs or thrown away to enable the tours 'plausible deniability' if stopped when in these areas. Tours found in places where they were not supposed to be were usually pursued and, if caught, arrested and detained for a while at the nearest Kommandatura. (Note: As the Missions refused to acknowledge the authority of either the East German Army (NVA) or police (Volkspolizei or "VoPo") the tour officer always insisted on dealing only with the local Soviet Kommandant (garrison commander).) The main risk to persistent offenders was that they might be declared persona non grata and have their passes withdrawn – a complete waste of the expensive specialist training they had undergone before being posted to BRIXMIS.

This freedom of movement throughout East Germany allowed the collection of intelligence on Warsaw Pact forces, particularly those of the Soviet Union and East Germany, which included force disposition and movement, orders of battle, equipment, and professional standards. The configuration of liaison teams was established in the initial agreement and remained in place throughout the life of the programme. These were made up of a tour officer, a tour NCO, and a driver, all of whom in later years received similar training. Their ground operations tours were conducted in cars, reconnoitering either on an ad hoc basis or as directed by Defence Intelligence in London. Such tours could take a number of days with the teams being entirely self-sufficient, cooking their own meals and sleeping in the countryside either in the vehicle, as the driver always had to, or, as the other two normally did, in bivouacs or one-man tents. Once they had left Potsdam, they were entirely out of contact with their headquarters, and therefore left to their own devices to deal with any unforeseen circumstances, whether they be problems or opportunities.

Incidents of open hostility to tourers – such as being physically attacked or shot at, or having the vehicle deliberately rammed – were infrequent, but they did nevertheless happen occasionally. What was very common, however, was the tailing of crews by so-called "narks" – members of the East German State Security Service (Stasi). A combination of superior equipment, driving skills, and the ever-increasing knowledge of the local terrain possessed by the BRIXMIS crews meant, however, that they could usually be shaken off.

The British Mission was almost entirely overt, in that all personnel operated in uniform and in marked vehicles, although there were occasions when the officer and tour NCO would leave the driver in the vehicle and explore on foot, while deliberately concealing any obvious evidence of their military identity. (Note: When searching through rubbish tips for discarded items of interest, for example, they removed all badges from outer garments and left anything in the car which might be incriminating if dropped, including their passes.) The reciprocal Soviet Mission to the British zone operated in a more covert manner, however, in that it also had an agent handling capability.

BRIXMIS was also noted for many technical intelligence coups, including:

- Secretly bringing a Yak-28P Firebar's Skip Spin (Oryel-D) radar and Tumansky R-11 AF2-300 jet engines back to Farnborough for inspection after it crashed into the Stössensee lake on the River Havel in Berlin.
- Measuring the calibre of the 30mm gun of the then brand-new BMP-2 armoured personnel carrier, by pressing a lunchtime apple into it and taking an impression.
- Stealing reactive armour from a Russian tank, for analysis.

== Vehicles ==
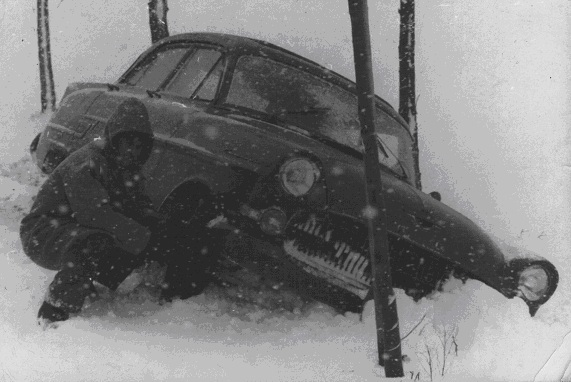
BRIXMIS Opel Kapitän stuck in the snow, Winter 1957–1958

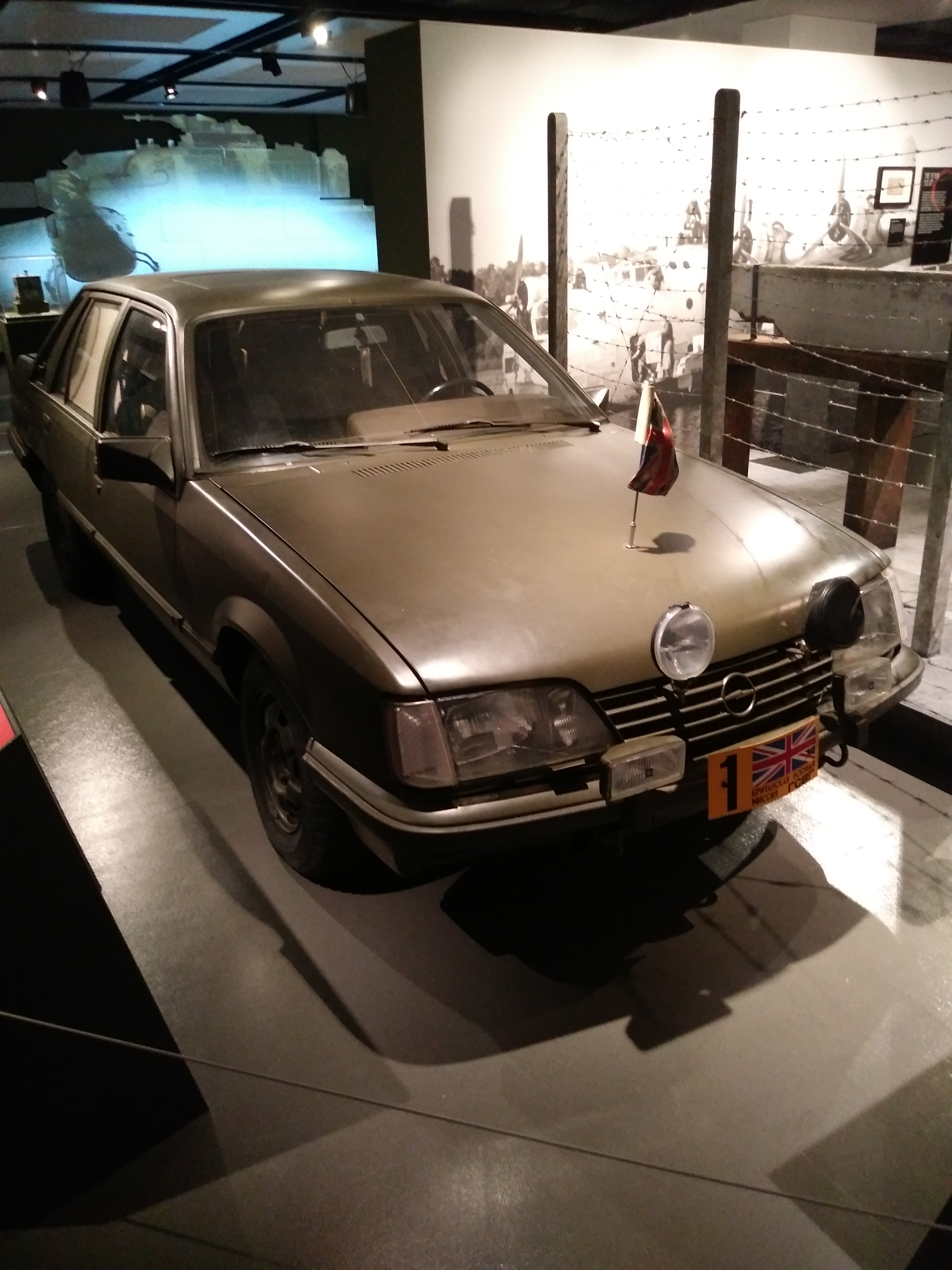
Opel Senator at the National Army Museum in London

The BRIXMIS contingent used Opel Kapitän cars in the 1950s, followed by Opel Admiral cars and their later replacement, the Opel Senator, converted to four-wheel drive in the UK by FF Developments. However, the operational need for a vehicle with a higher degree of cross-country performance than the mainly on-road Opel Senator led them to acquire a number of extensively modified Range-Rover vehicles. These proved to be fragile and expensive to run and maintain in Germany. With this in mind, they acquired a single Mercedes-Benz G-Class for trials purposes in 1980–81. After extensive evaluation, they adopted the Geländewagen as the general tour vehicle, and in various models, it lasted in service until they ceased operations in 1990. An ex-BRIXMIS G-Wagen is on display at the Military Intelligence Museum at Chicksands, England.

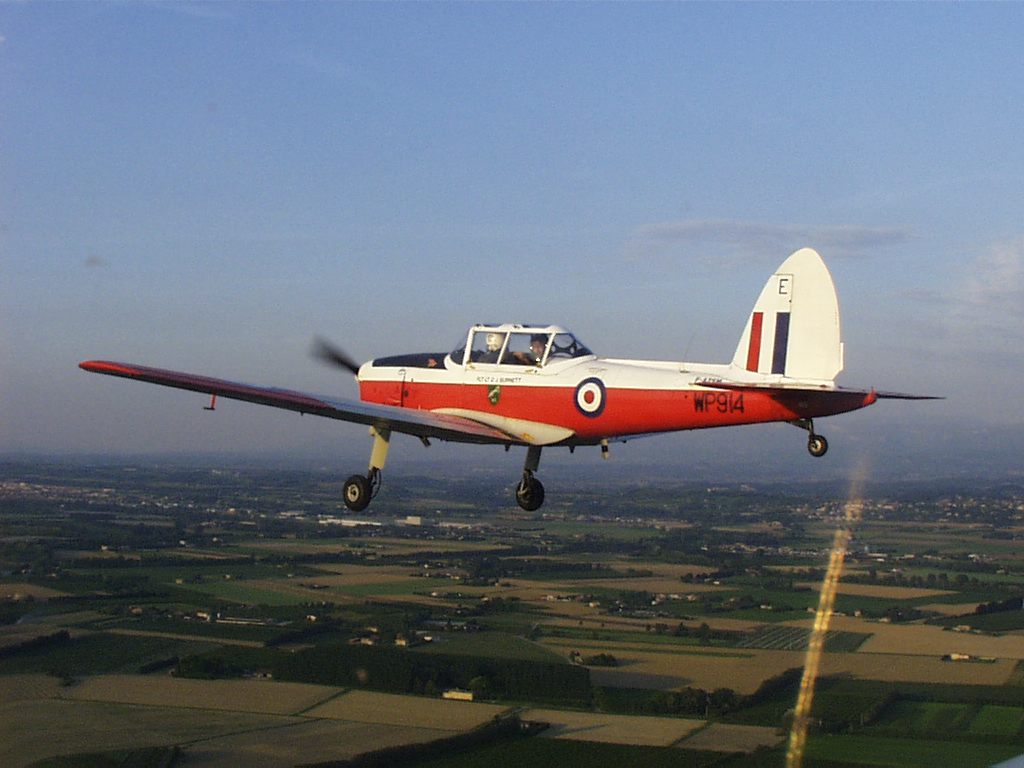
de Havilland Canada DHC-1 Chipmunk T10 – a type used for photo-reconnaissance missions by BRIXMIS

BRIXMIS also exercised the British legal right under the Potsdam Agreement to use the airspace over both West and East Berlin, as well as the air corridors to and from West Germany to the city. Two de Havilland Canada DHC-1 Chipmunk T10s were based at RAF Gatow and RAF aircrew posted to BRIXMIS had access to them for the conduct of photographic reconnaissance flights within the designated airspace: a radius of 12 nautical miles (22 km; 14 mi) within the Berlin Control Zone (BCZ) from the Berlin Air Safety Centre (BASC) located in West Berlin.

After the fall of the Berlin Wall, Chipmunk reconnaissance flights soon ceased and the two Chipmunks were flown to RAF Laarbruch, in Western Germany to await disposal. Chipmunk WG466 was flown back to Berlin and was donated to the Allied Museum in Berlin, where it remains on display today. WG486 is still in RAF service with the Battle of Britain Memorial Flight.
