= Manfred Osten =

German poet and cultural historian (born 1938)

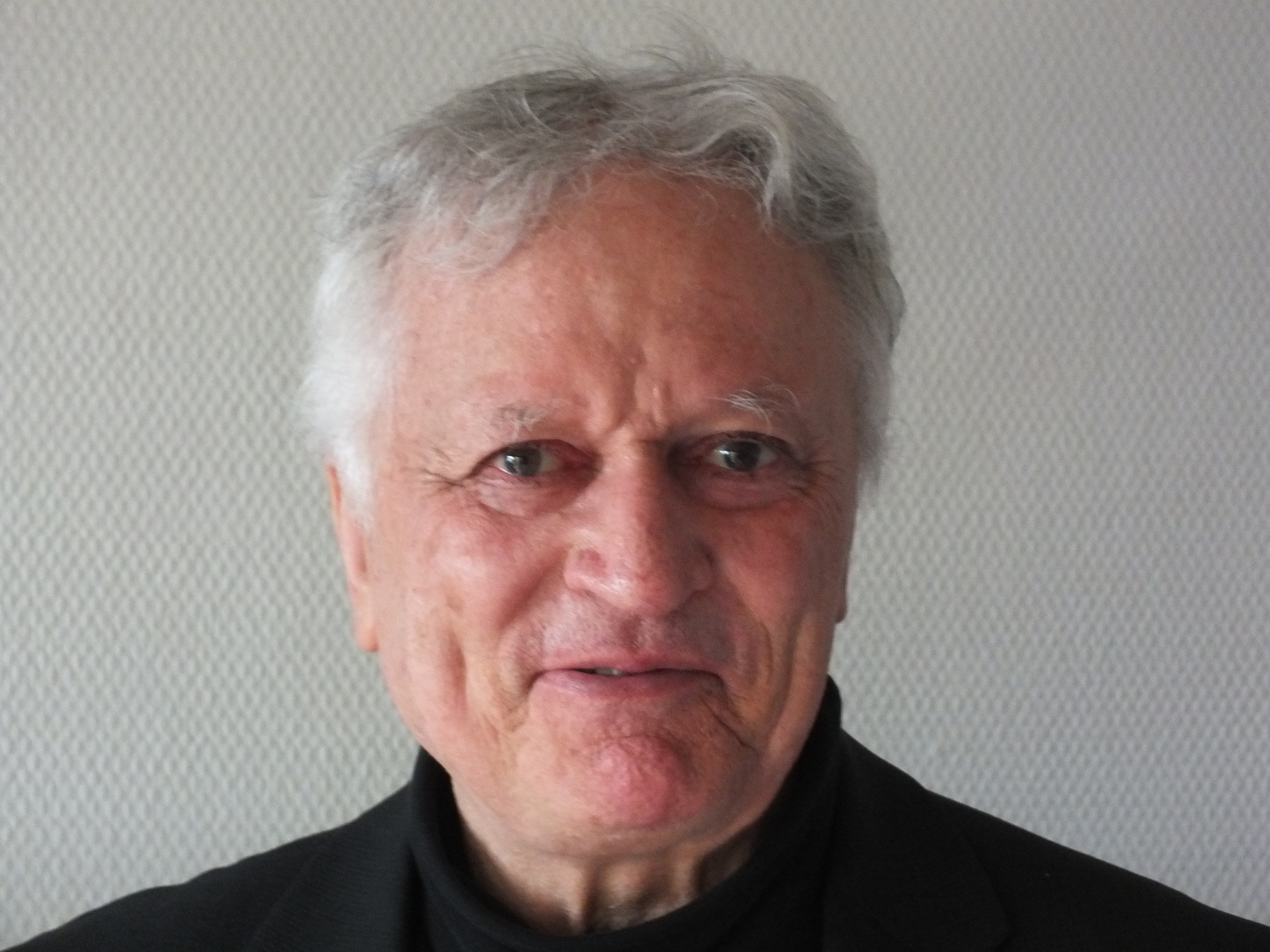
Osten in 2016

Manfred Osten (born 19 January 1938 in Ludwigslust) is a German poet, author, lawyer, former diplomat and cultural historian.

== Biography ==
He was born in Ludwigslust in the region of Mecklenburg, which became part of the German Democratic Republic after World War II. He escaped to the Federal Republic of Germany in 1952. In 1969, he earned a doctorate upon the completion of a thesis concerning the concept of natural law in the early writings of Schelling. He then joined the diplomatic service of the Federal Republic of Germany. His career as a diplomat included postings in France, Cameroon, Chad, Australia, Japan, and Hungary. From 1995 to 2004 he was the Secretary-General of the Alexander von Humboldt Foundation.

He is an honorary Doctor of the Bulgarian Academy of Sciences, the University of Pécs, the University of Bucharest, and the Alexandru Ioan Cuza University of Iași. In 1993 he received the Order of the Rising Sun from the Japanese government. He is in addition a member of the Academy of Sciences and Literature in Mainz. In 2008 he was admitted to the Order of Merit of the Federal Republic of Germany.

== Publications ==
=== Monographs ===
- Gedenke zu leben! Wage es, glücklich zu sein!- oder Goethe und das Glück, Wallstein-Verlag, Göttingen 2017, ISBN 978-3-8353-3024-5.
- Gespräche über Gott, Geist und Geld – Peter Sloterdijk, Thomas Macho, Manfred Osten, Herder Verlag, Freiburg 2016, ISBN 978-3-451-06872-0.
- Alles veloziferisch oder Goethes Entdeckung der Langsamkeit. Zur Modernität eines Klassikers im 21. Jahrhundert, Insel Verlag, Frankfurt am Main/ Leipzig 2003, ISBN 3-458-17159-2.
- mit Hans U. Brauner: Es gilt das gebrochene Wort – Das Ende der Glaubwürdigkeit. Allitera Verlag, München 2013, ISBN 978-3-86906-575-5.
- Die Kunst, Fehler zu machen. (= Bibliothek der Lebenskunst). Suhrkamp, Frankfurt am Main 2006, ISBN 3-518-41744-4.
- Diese gewisse Leichtigkeit. Horst Janssen und der Mozart-Faktor. St. Gertrude-Verlag, Hamburg 2005, ISBN 3-935855-08-7.
- Das geraubte Gedächtnis: digitale Systeme und die Zerstörung der Erinnerungskultur; eine kleine Geschichte des Vergessens. Insel-Verlag, Frankfurt am Main/ Leipzig 2004, ISBN 3-458-17231-9.
- Homunculus, die beschleunigte Zeit und Max Beckmanns Illustrationen zur Modernität Goethes Steiner Verlag, Stuttgart 2002, ISBN 3-515-08205-0.
- als Hrsg.: Alexander von Humboldt: Über die Freiheit des Menschen auf der Suche nach Wahrheit. Insel-Suhrkamp-Verlag, 1999, ISBN 3-458-34221-4.
- Die Erotik des Pfirsichs: 12 Porträts japanischer Schriftsteller. (Suhrkamp-Taschenbuch 2015). Suhrkamp, Frankfurt am Main 1996, ISBN 3-518-39015-5.
