= Die Kerzen =

German dream pop band

Die Kerzen (English: "The Candles") is a German dream pop band.

The band, hailing from Ludwigslust, Mecklenburg-Vorpommern, was inspired by dream pop, New Romantic and Neue Deutsche Welle.

Their debut album True Love was released in 2019 by the Staatsakt label. It received reviews such as 3.5 out of 6 from Musikexpress, 7.5 out of 10 from Der Spiegel and 8 out of 10 from Plattentests.de.

Pferde & Flammen followed on the same label in 2022.

== Personnel ==
- Felix Keiler – vocals, guitar
- Jelena von Eisenhart Rothe – vocals, keyboards
- Fabian Rose – bass
- Lucas Wojatschke – drums
