= Glienicke Bridge =

Bridge across the Havel River in Germany

Glienicke Bridge Glienicker Brücke
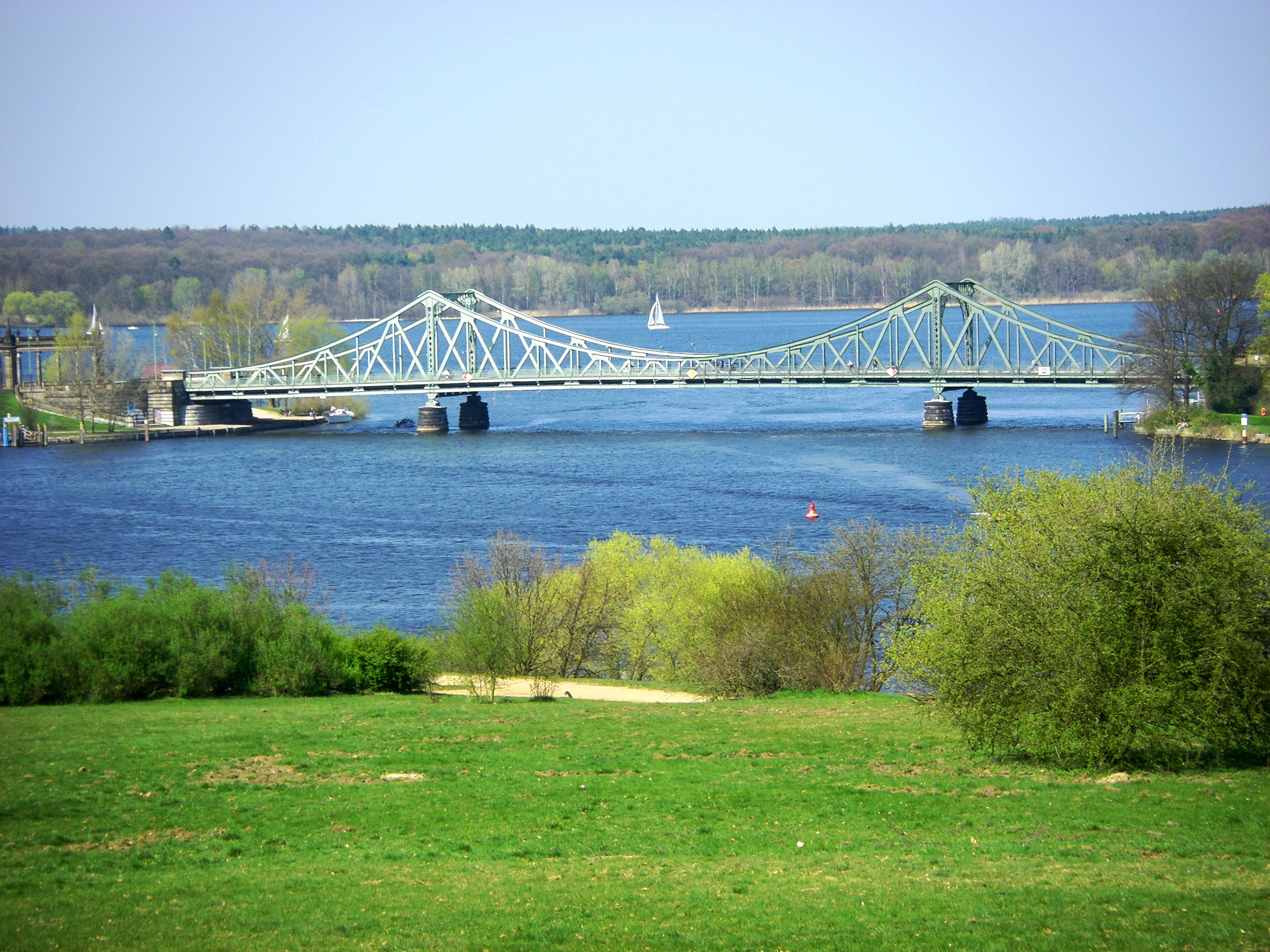
- Glienicke Bridge connecting Potsdam and Berlin, seen from Babelsberg Park
- Coordinates: 52.413431°N 13.090114°E
- Carries: Bundesstraße 1
- Crosses: Havel River
- Begins: Wannsee
- Ends: Potsdam
- Other name: Bridge of Spies
- Named for: Glienicke Palace

History
- Opened: 1907

Location
- Interactive map of Glienicke Bridge

The Glienicke Bridge (German: Glienicker Brücke, German pronunciation) is a bridge across the Havel River in Germany, connecting the Wannsee district of Berlin with the Brandenburg capital, Potsdam. It is named after nearby Glienicke Palace. The current bridge, the fourth on the site, was completed in 1907, although major reconstruction was necessary after it was damaged during World War II.

During the Cold War, this portion of the Havel River formed the border between West Berlin and East Germany. The bridge was thus a crossing of the inner German border and was therefore used several times for the exchange of captured spies, becoming known as the Bridge of Spies.

== Location ==
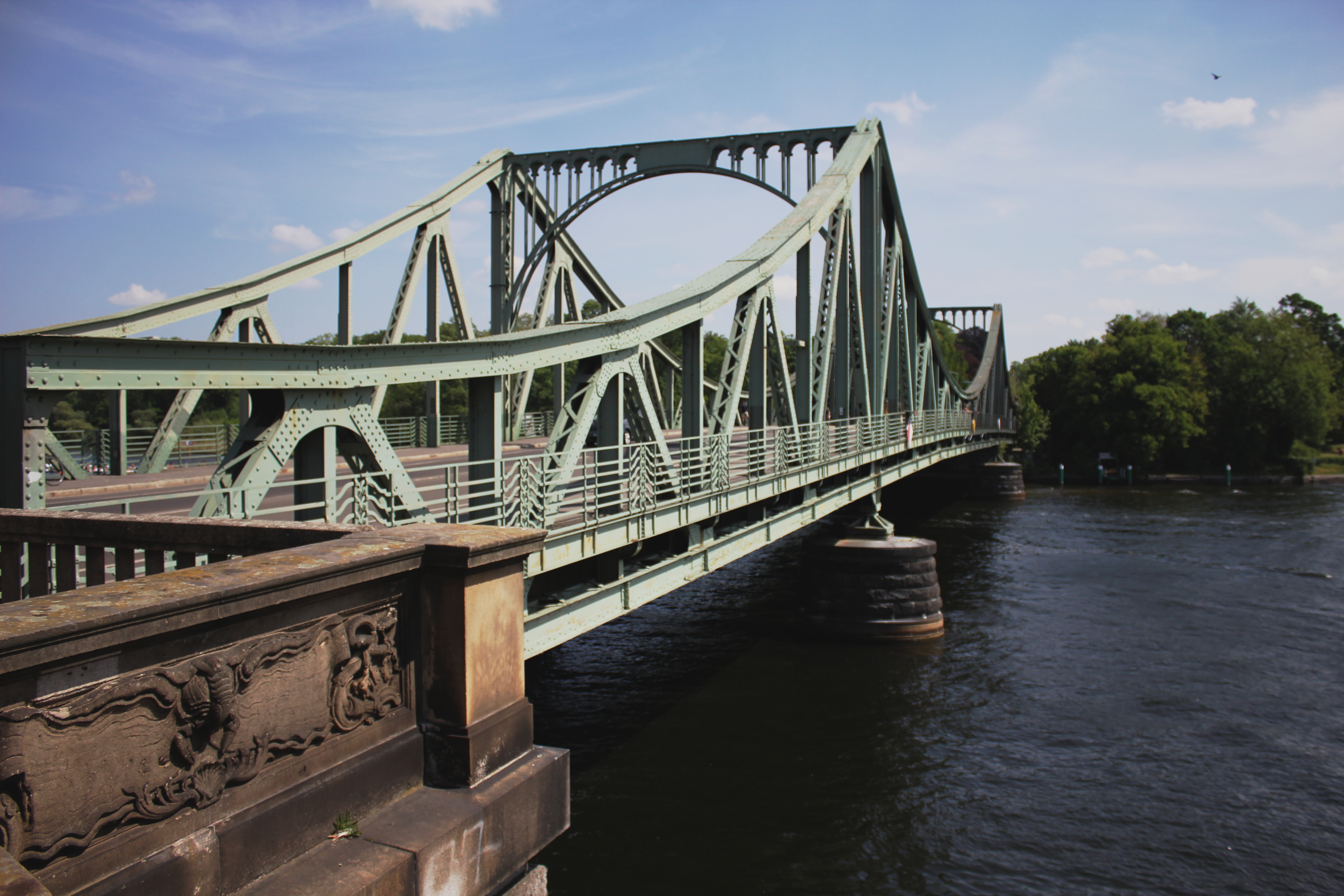
Glienicke Bridge, looking east

The bridge spans the Havel narrows between the Jungfernsee (lake) to the north and the Glienicker Lake to the south. It carries the Bundesstraße 1 highway. The Glienicke Palace and Jagdschloss Glienicke are situated (across the highway from each other) near the east (Berlin) end of the bridge. Potsdam tram route 93 from Potsdam main station and Berlin bus route 316 from Wannsee station terminate and interconnect at a tram stop on the Potsdam end of the bridge. The respective Potsdam and Wannsee stations are served by the Berlin S-Bahn and by longer distance trains.

== History ==
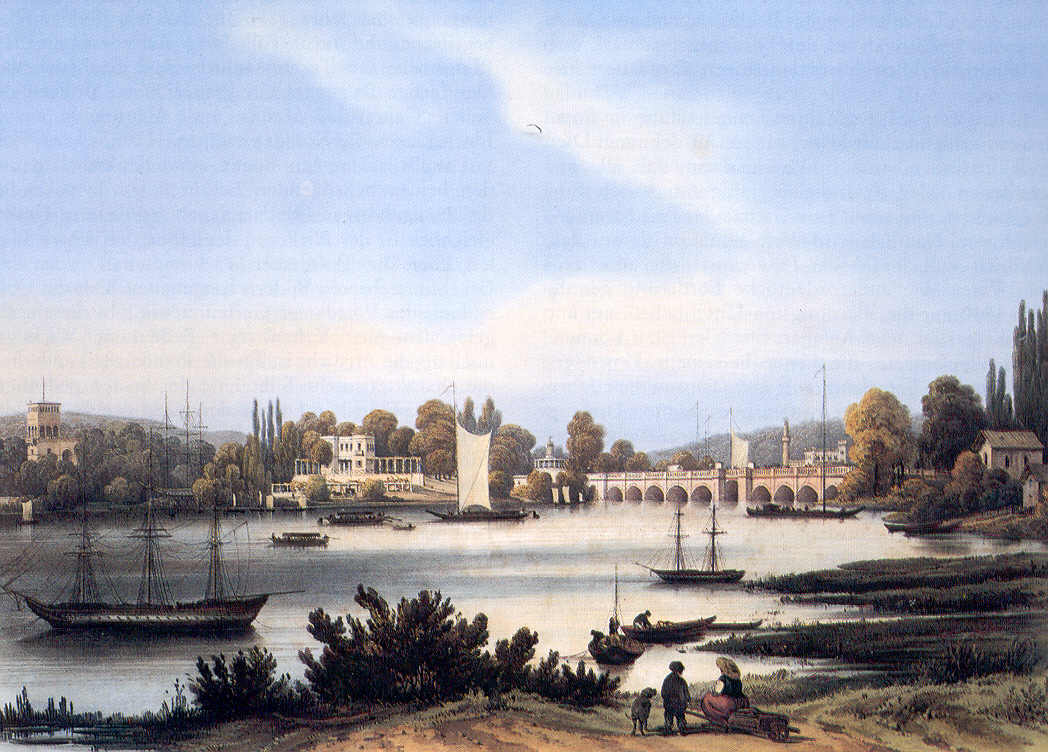
Glienicke Bridge, painting by Franz Xaver Sandmann, 1845

A first wooden bridge across the Havel River at this location was built about 1660, in order to reach the hunting grounds around Stolpe. By the early 1800s, a new, non-wooden bridge was needed to accommodate the massive increase in traffic on the chaussee between the Prussian capital Berlin and the Hohenzollern residence in Potsdam. The architect Karl Friedrich Schinkel designed a brick and wood bascule bridge, which was finished in 1834. By the early 20th century, Schinkel's bridge was no longer able to handle the increased volume in traffic, and operating the moveable sections of the bridge caused delays in steamer traffic on the Havel River.

In 1904, the Prussian government held a design competition to replace Schinkel's bridge with a modern, iron bridge. The Johann Caspar Harkort Company of Duisburg submitted the winning design, and the present-day bridge was inaugurated on 16 November 1907.

The German film studio UFA shot the film Unter den Brücken (Under the Bridges) at the Glienicke Bridge in 1944 and 1945. At the end of April 1945, an unexploded shell severely damaged the bridge. The reconstruction of the steel bridge was not completed until 1949, after the establishment of West Germany and East Germany. The East German government named it the “Bridge of Unity" as the border between East Germany and Western Allied-occupied West Berlin ran across the middle of the bridge.

=== Cold War ===
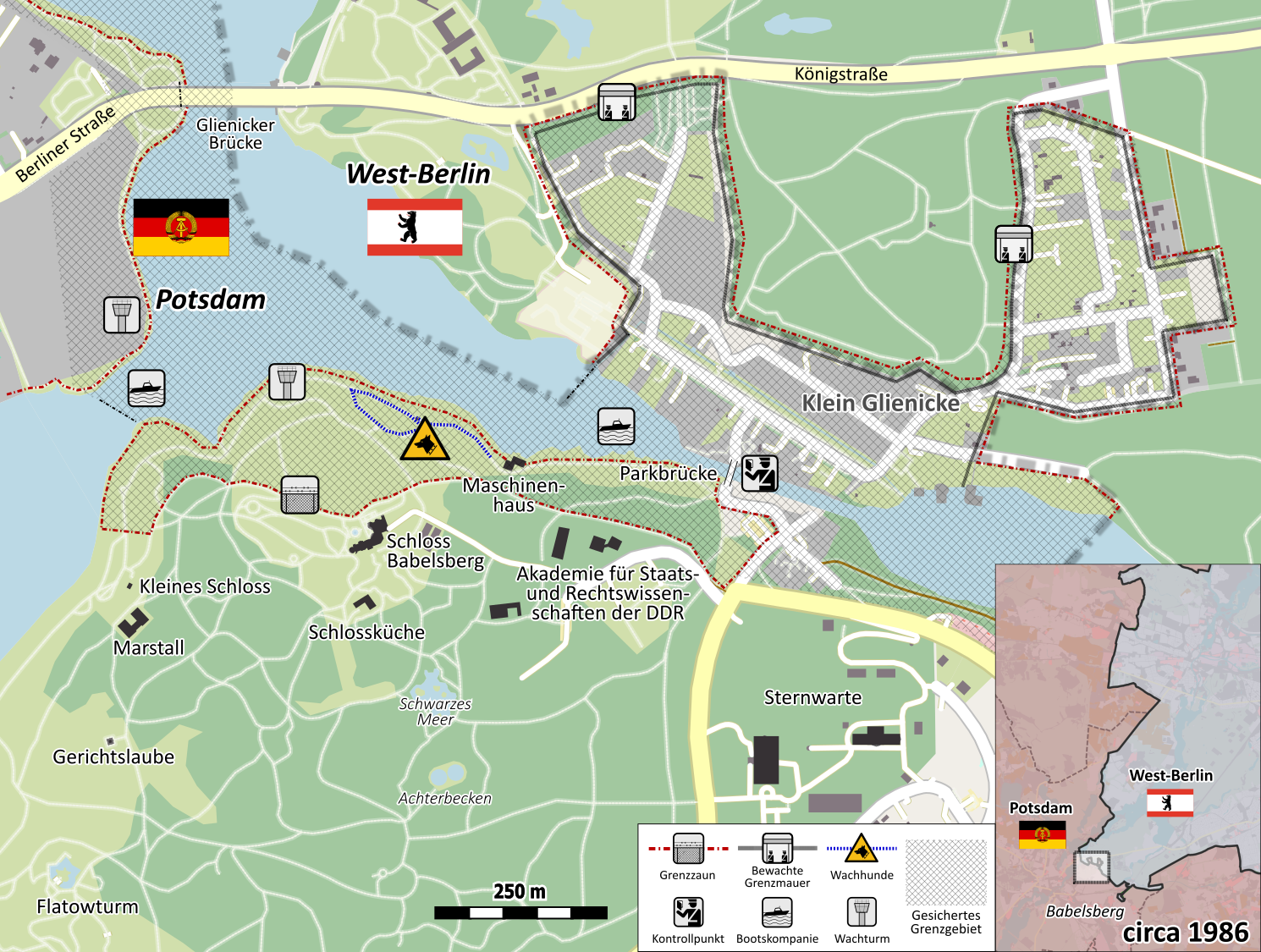
Map of the region with borders marked. Glienicke Bridge at northwest.

During the early years of the Cold War, the bridge was mainly used by the Allies as a link between their Berlin sections and the military liaison missions in Potsdam. German residents of the two cities more frequently used the S-Bahn suburban rail to travel between Berlin and Potsdam. On 27 May 1952, East German authorities closed the bridge to citizens of West Berlin and West Germany. The bridge was closed to East German citizens after the construction of the Berlin Wall in August 1961. Only Allied military personnel and foreign diplomats were allowed to access the bridge at any time.

Of all the checkpoints between West Berlin and East Berlin, as well as those between West Berlin and East Germany, the Glienicke Bridge was unique in that it was the only one not only having a Soviet presence but also being under full Soviet control; all other checkpoints were under East German control with no Soviet presence.

By the 1970s, the bridge had outlived its projected lifespan and needed significant repairs. The cost of these repairs became a focus of a dispute between the government of West Berlin and the government of East Germany. In 1980 the West Berlin government repaired its half of the bridge, and in 1985 the West Berlin government paid for repairs to the East German half of the bridge in exchange for formally renaming the bridge "Glienicke Bridge" from "Bridge of Unity."

On the evening of 10 November 1989, one day after the opening of the Berlin Wall, the Glienicke Bridge was reopened for pedestrians. Border fortifications and barricades were dismantled as a part of German reunification in 1990.

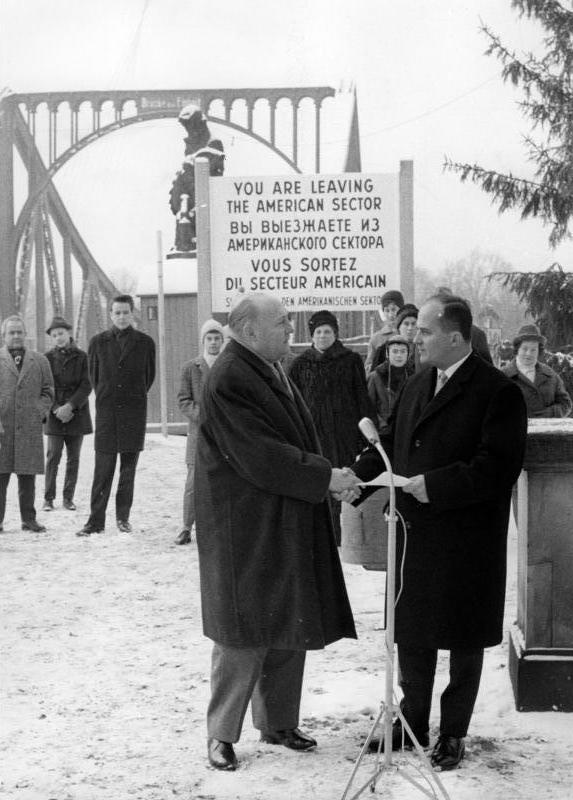
Ministerial meeting on the West Berlin side in 1962

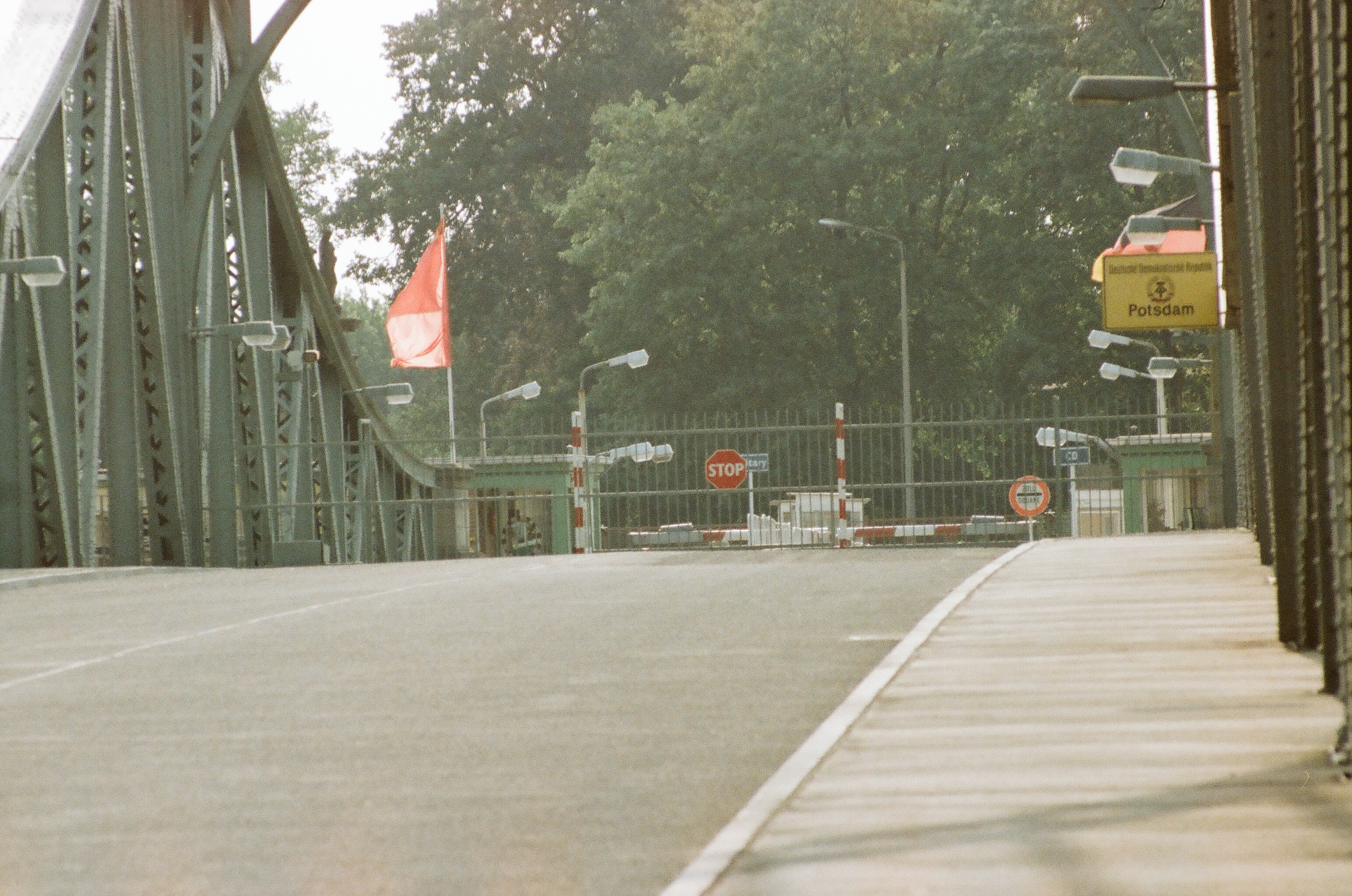
East German border crossing, 1987

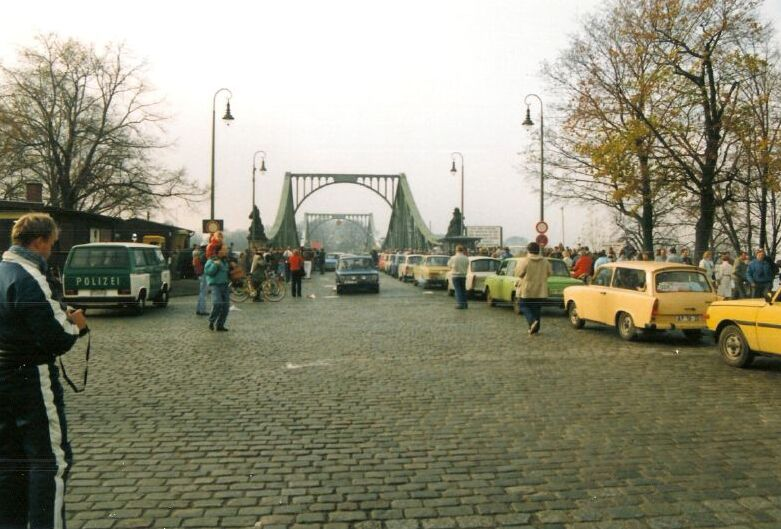
Lining up to cross the bridge after the Fall of the Berlin Wall in November 1989

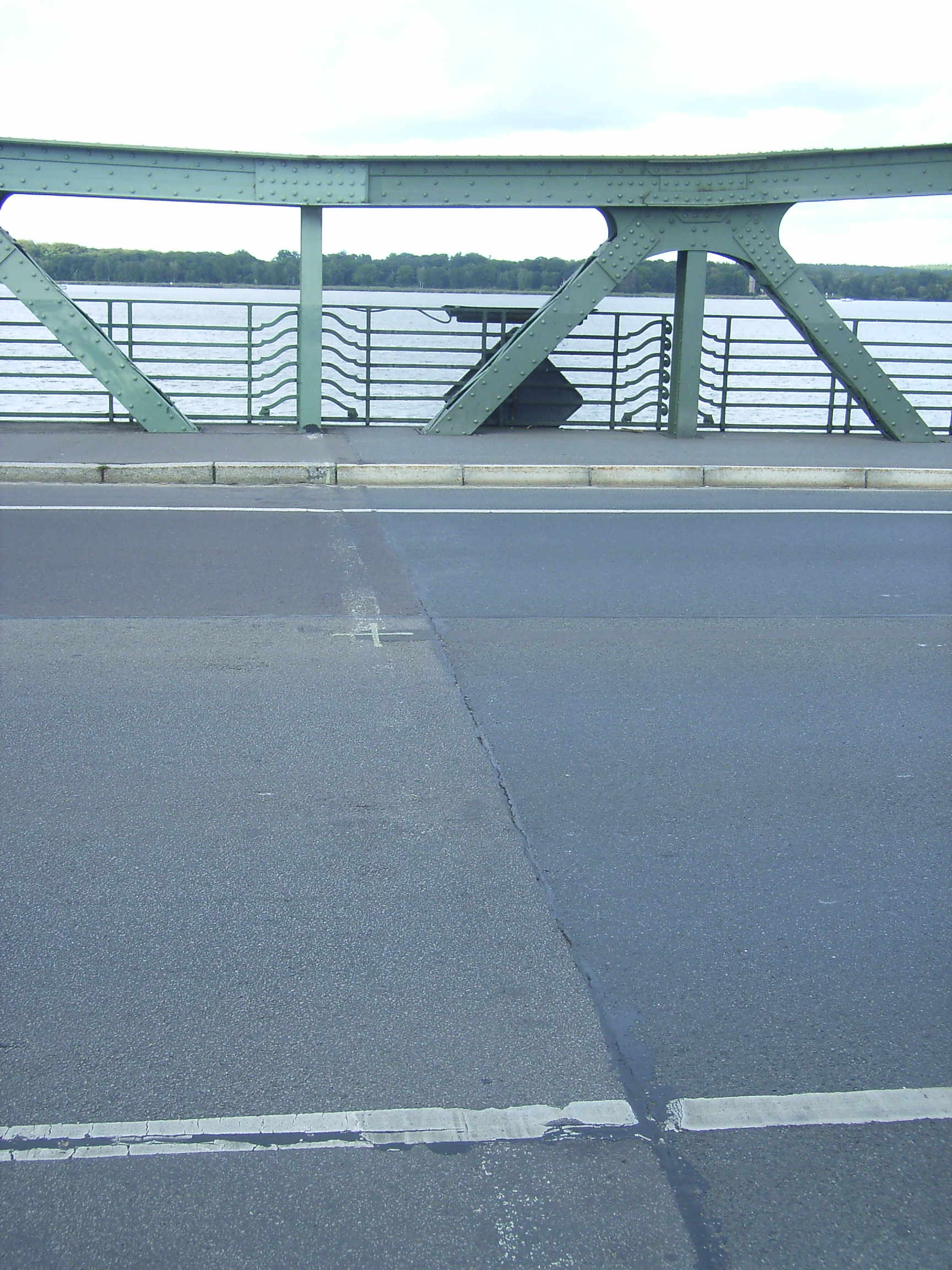
Midpoint of the Glienicke Bridge; site of East/West prisoner exchanges

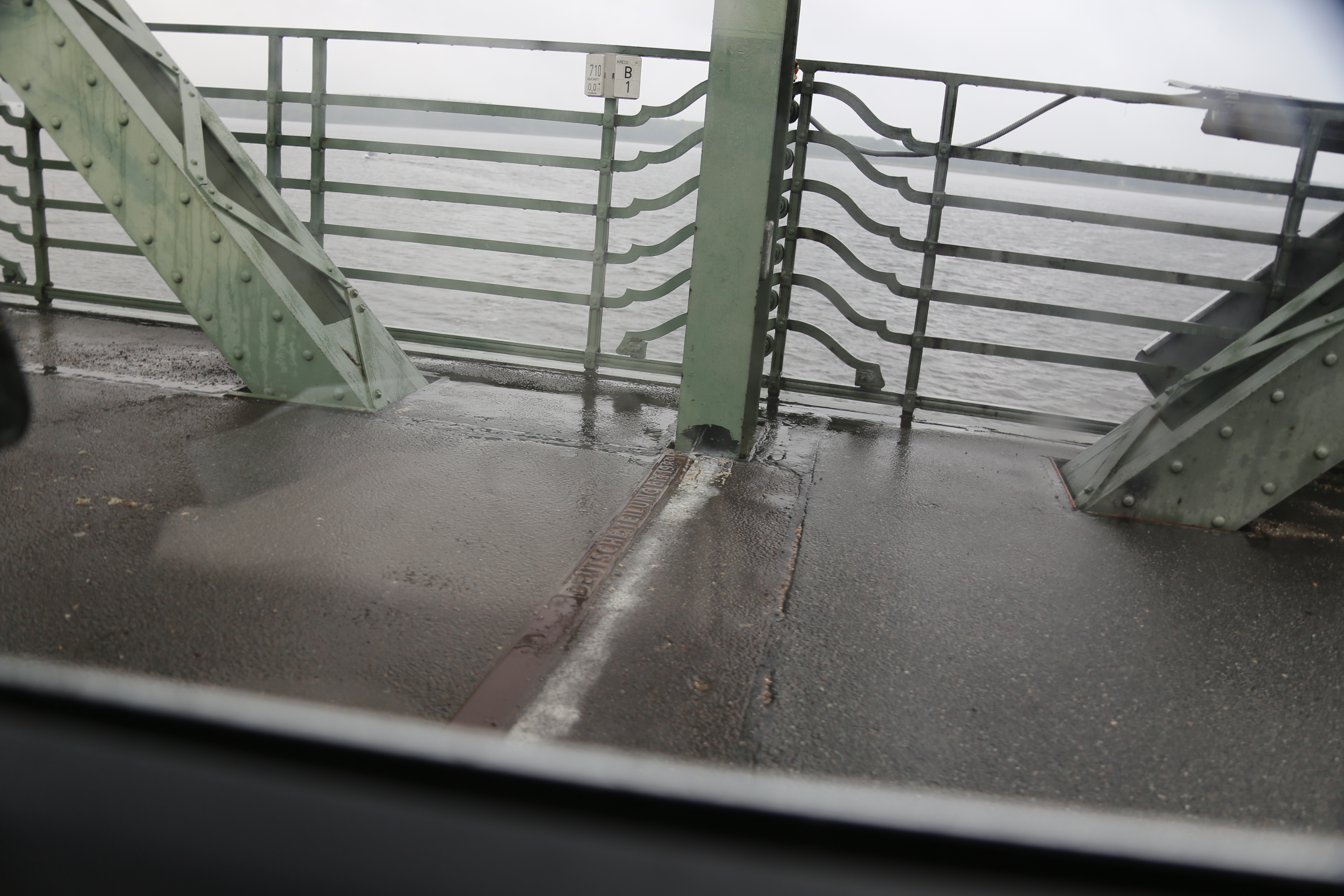
Glienicke Bridge midpoint

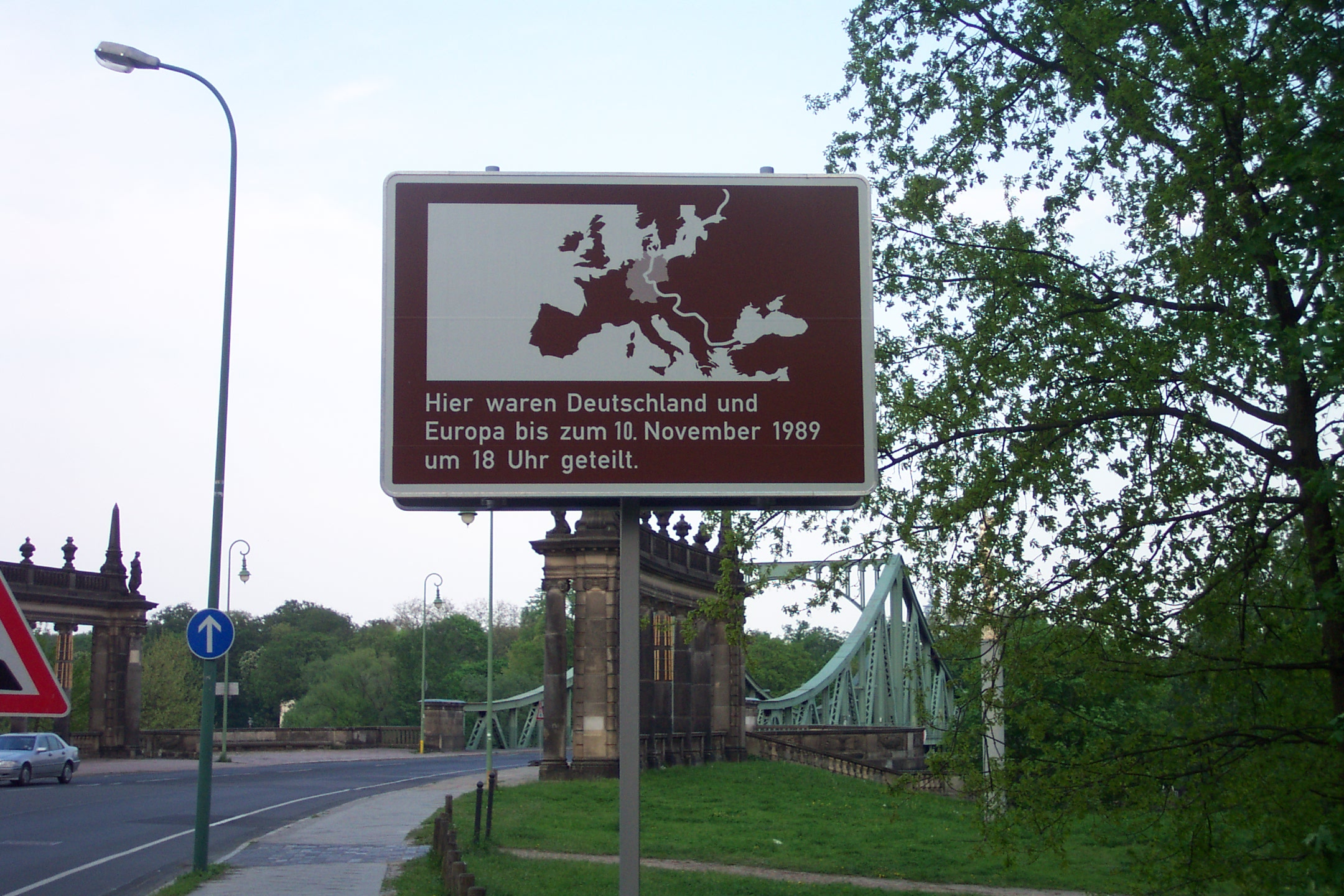
Sign commemorating the bridge's position on the internal border

=== Bridge of Spies ===
The Glienicke Bridge was a restricted border crossing between the Eastern Bloc, via Potsdam in East Germany, and territory affiliated with the Western powers, the American sector of West Berlin. Because of this, Americans and Soviets used it for the exchange of captured spies during the Cold War, with the bridge directly controlled, not by the GDR, but by the Soviet Union.

Reporters began calling it the "Bridge of Spies." When this name was later used as the title for various works, it was often taken to be a pun on "bridge of sighs" a name applied first to the bridge in Venice and then to others.

The first prisoner exchange took place on 10 February 1962. The Americans released Rudolf Abel, convicted of spying for the Soviet Union in 1957, in exchange for Gary Powers, the pilot of a U-2 spy plane shot down in 1960.

When US military attache Arthur D. Nicholson was shot by a Soviet sentry in March 1985, his body was returned to the US Army at the Glienicke Bridge.

On 12 June 1985, there was a swap of 23 American agents held in Eastern Europe for Polish agent Marian Zacharski and another three Soviet agents arrested in the West. The exchange was the result of three years of negotiation.

The final exchange was also the most public. On 11 February 1986 the human rights campaigner (refusenik) and political prisoner Anatoly Shcharansky (now known as Natan Sharansky) and three Western agents were exchanged for Karl Koecher and four other Eastern agents.

== In popular culture ==
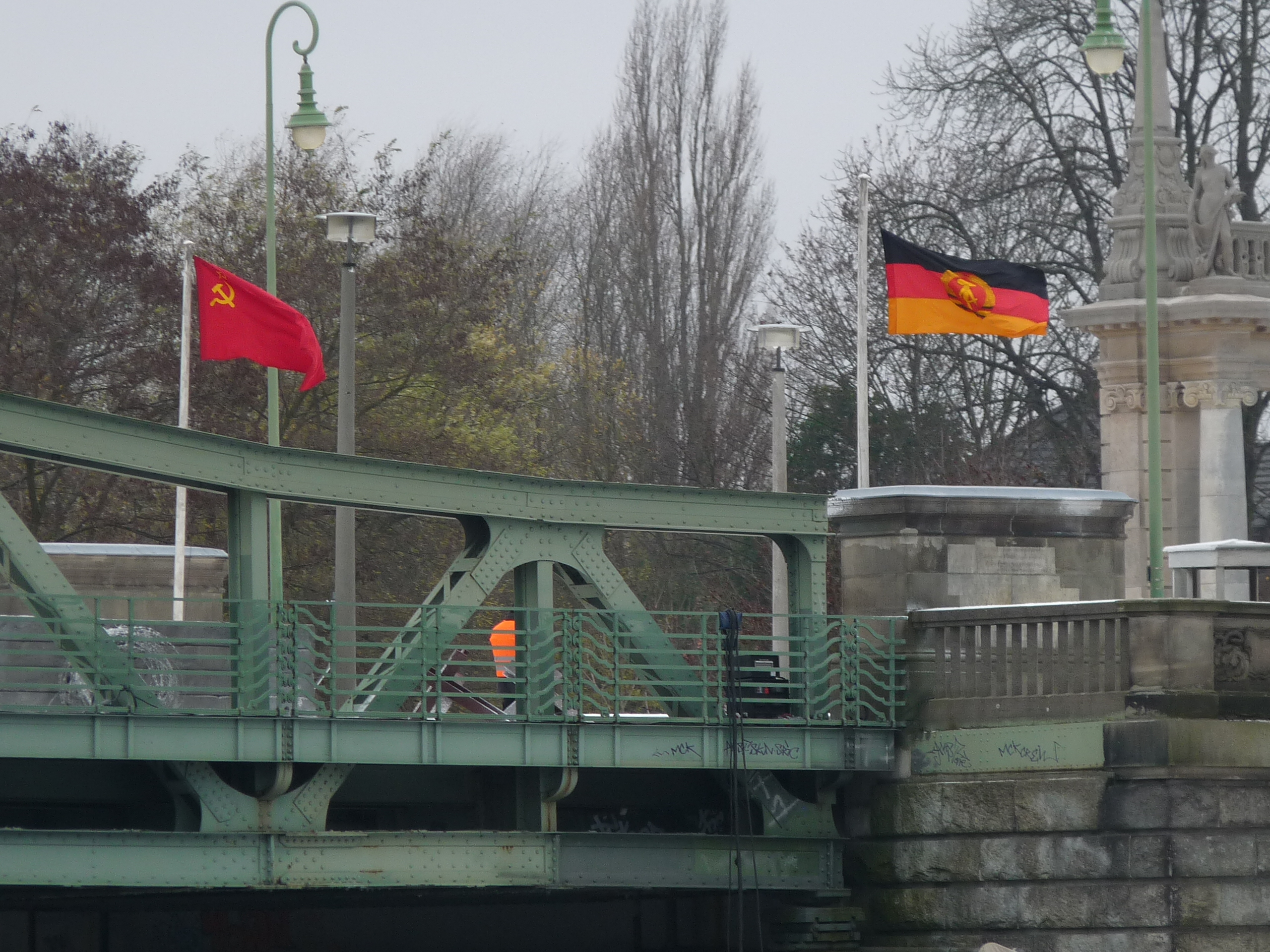
Glienicke Bridge during filming of Bridge of Spies (2015)

The Glienicke Bridge as a venue for prisoner exchange has appeared frequently in fiction, for example in the 1966 Harry Palmer film, Funeral in Berlin, based on the novel of the same name by Len Deighton.

The popular nickname "Bridge of Spies" was used by the British band T'Pau as the name of the title track on their first album. The usage is metaphorical, referring to a "walk to freedom" but in the context of a long-dreamt-of relationship.

The bridge is referenced in the children's TV series Codename: Kids Next Door, specifically when a bridge in a local mall is used to exchange a spy from the KND in return for a spy from the Teenagers, a parody of real-life prisoner exchanges.

There is a brief reference to the bridge in the sixth episode of the first season of Archer, when Mallory Archer and her long-time lover (and head of the KGB) Major Nikolai Jakov mention meeting there "one moonlit night" when they both worked on covert operations in Berlin, presumably during the Cold War.

The 2015 film Bridge of Spies, directed by Steven Spielberg and starring Tom Hanks, features the Powers–Abel prisoner exchange on the bridge as a major plot element.

Though the bridge is not named, it is spoofed in the 1971 film To Catch a Spy by replacing the bridge with a body of frozen water. Half way across, one of the persons being exchanged breaks through the ice and drowns.

The bridge is also seen close to the end of the book The Vornov Plot in which Colonel Olrik was swapped for Nastasia Wardynksa but Olrik escapes by jumping off the bridge while being shot at.

== Gallery ==
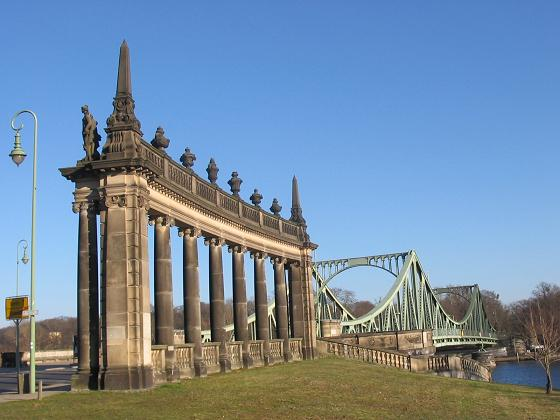
View from Potsdam

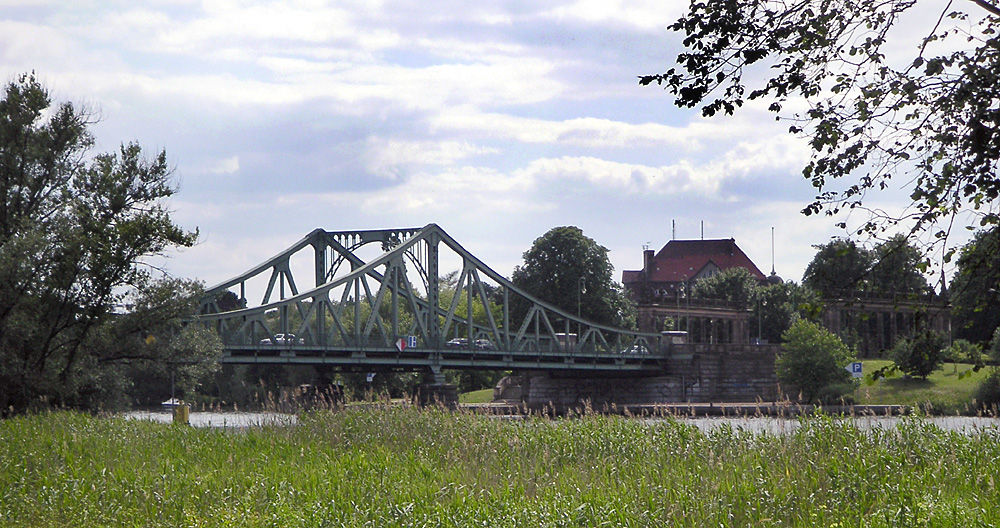
Another view to Potsdam

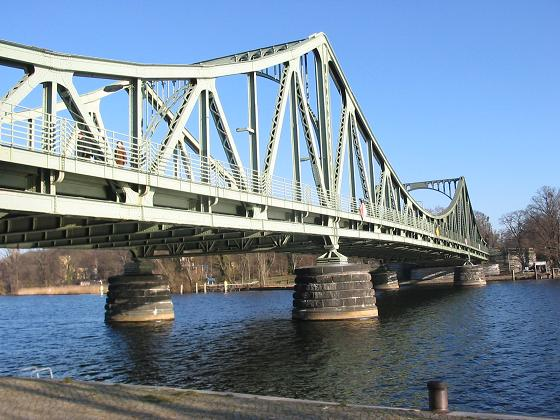
View from Potsdam through Jungfernsee

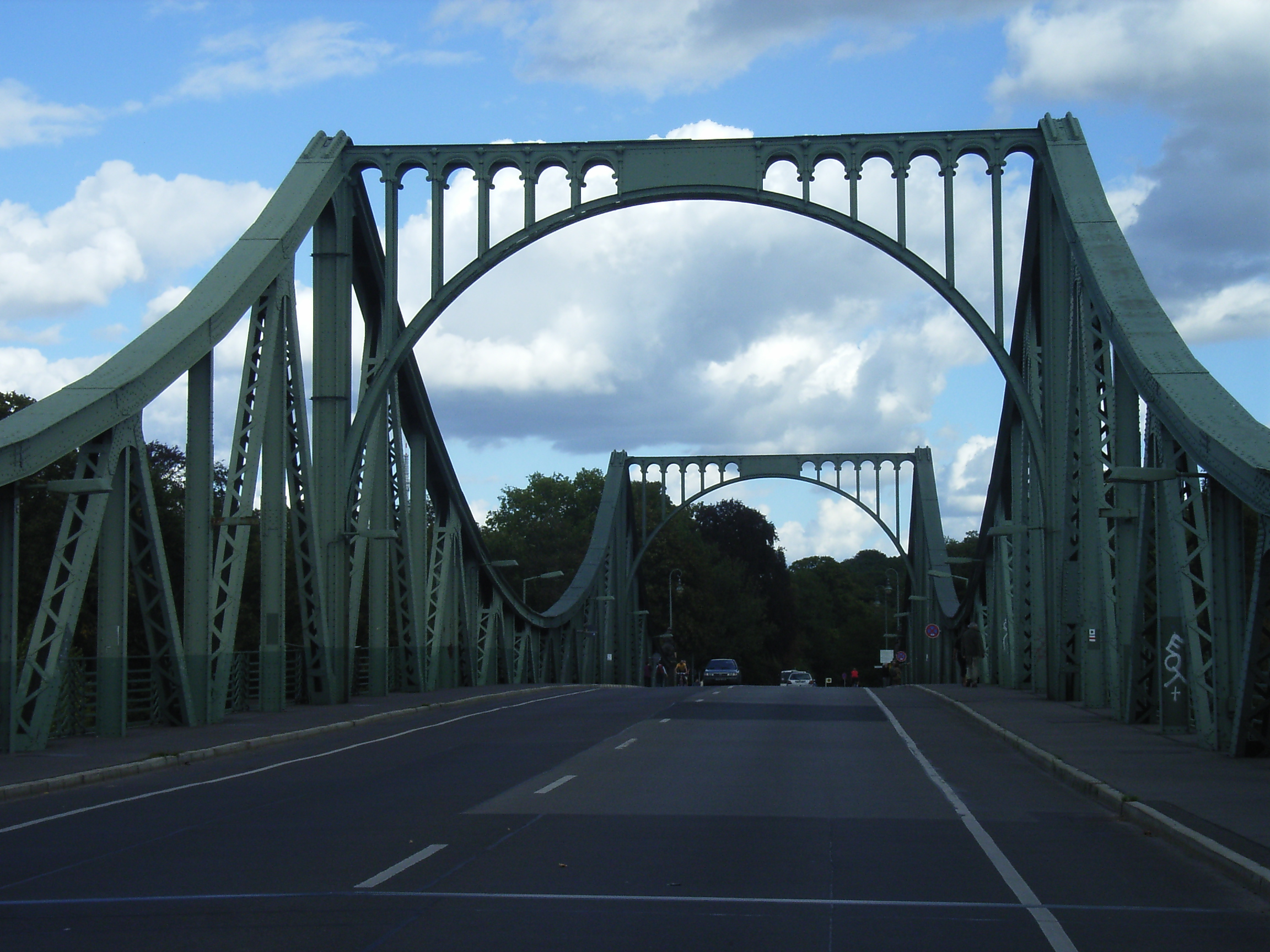
Arches

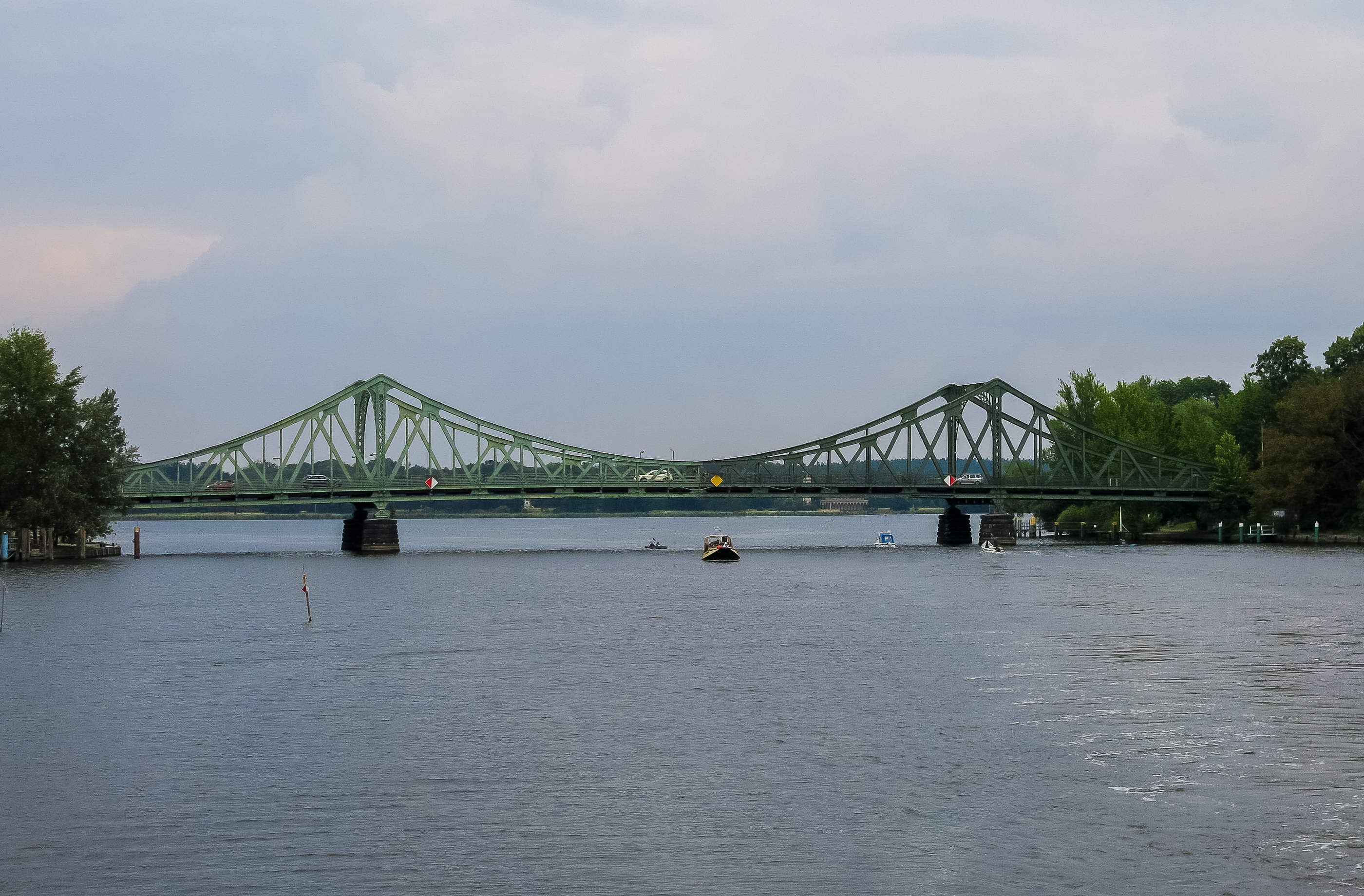
View of the bridge from a ship

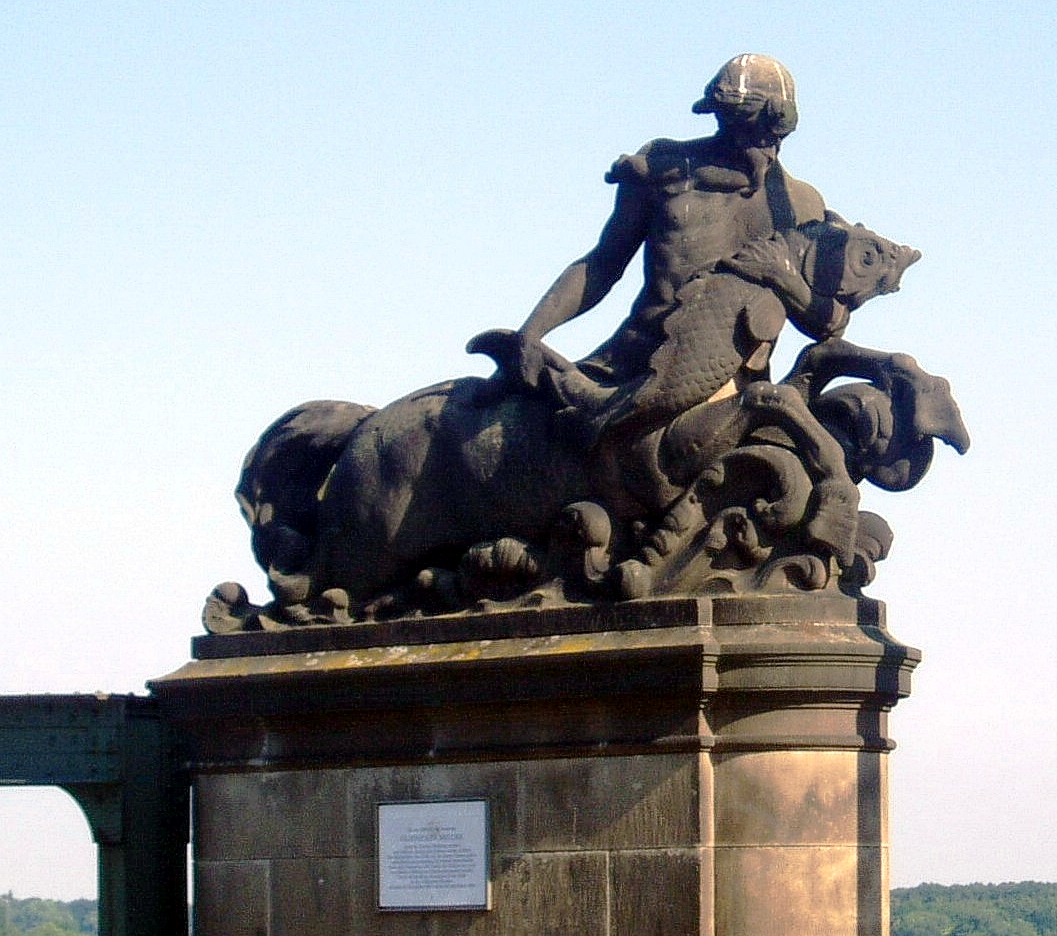
Centaur sculpture by Stephan Walter (1908)

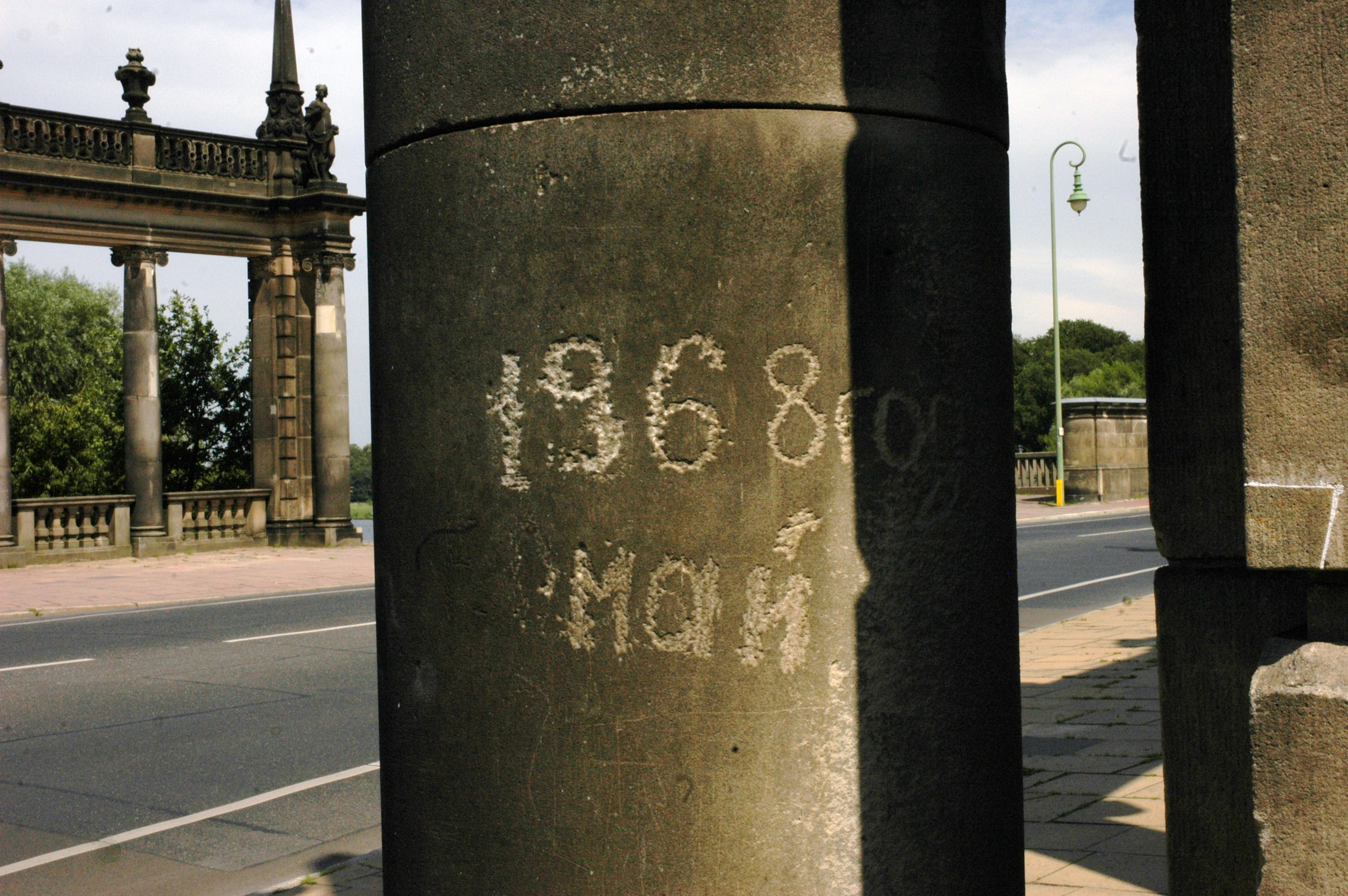
Russian graffiti of 1968

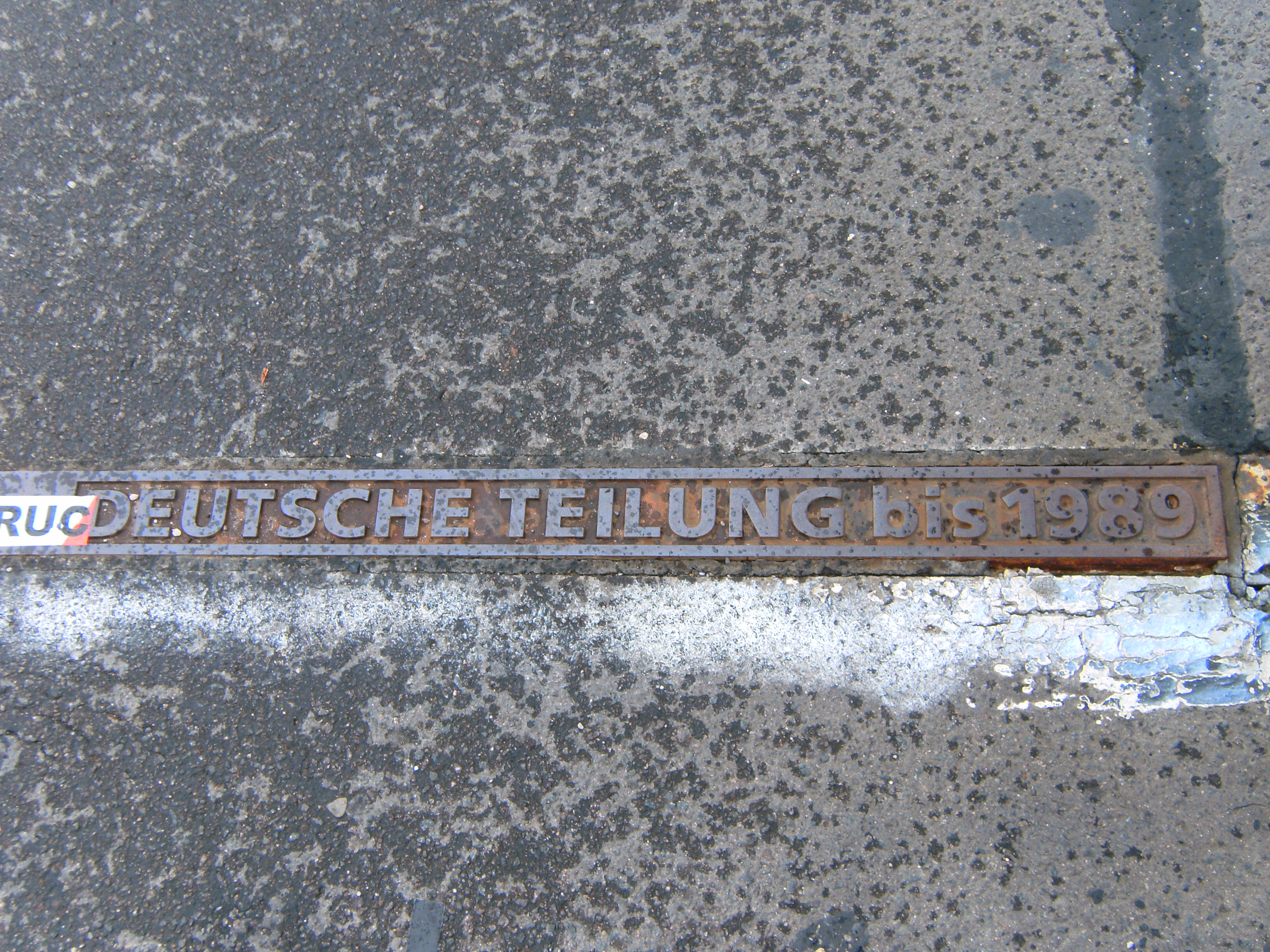
Plaque to remember the division of Germany until 1989

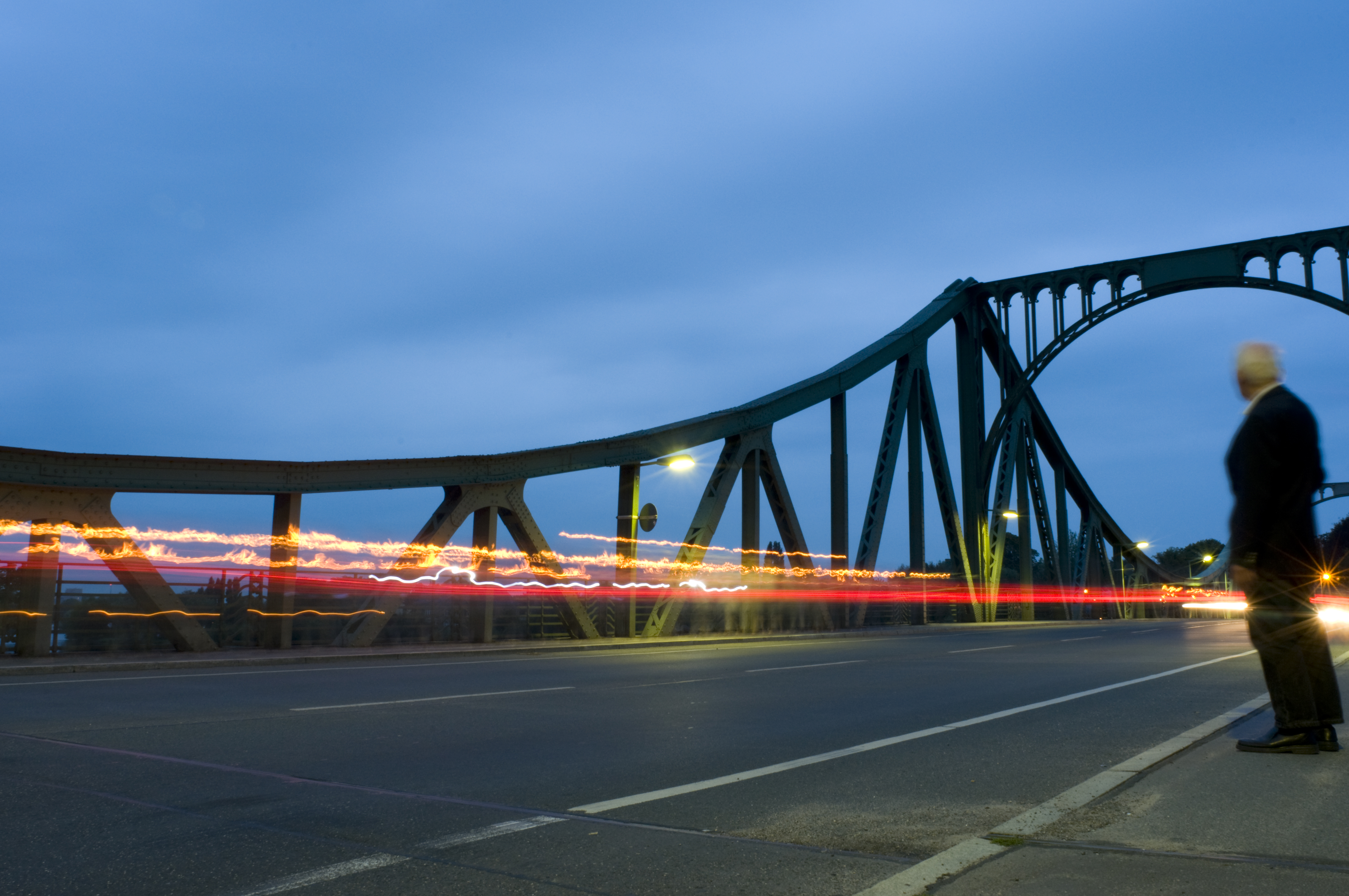
Car, torch, and candle lights on Glienicke Bridge, 13 August 2010

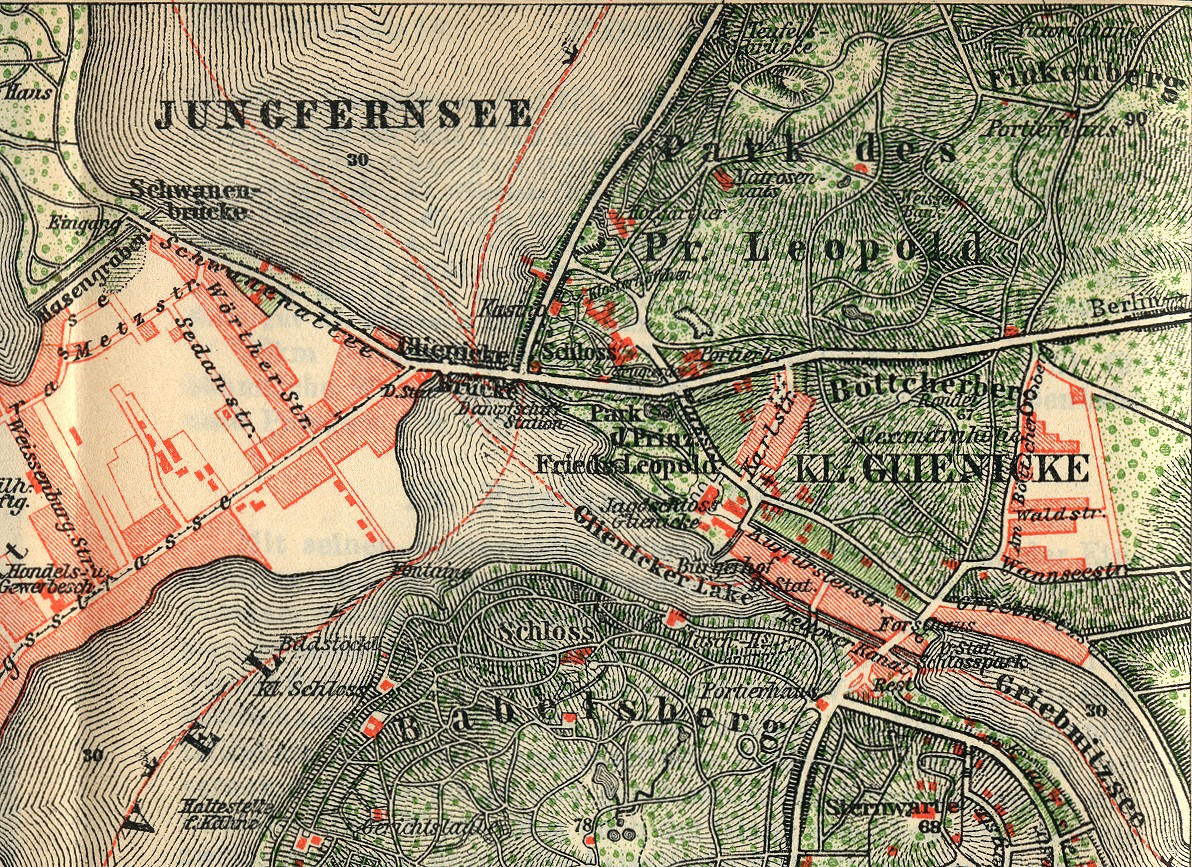
Map of bridge, lakes, and Klein Glienicke (1921, Baedeker)

== See also ==
- Bridge of No Return
- Hiền Lương Bridge
- Lo Wu Bridge
- Bridge of Sighs
