= Ludwigslust =

Town in Mecklenburg-Vorpommern, Germany

- Town
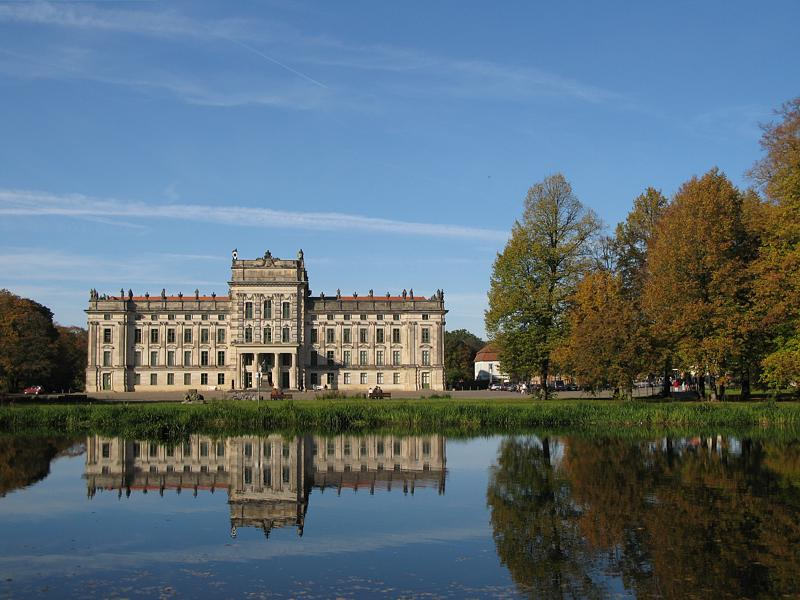
- Ludwigslust Palace

- Coat of arms

- Location of Ludwigslust within Ludwigslust-Parchim district
- Interactive map of Ludwigslust
- Location within Germany Location within Mecklenburg-Vorpommern
- Coordinates: 53°19′28″N 11°29′50″E
- Country: Germany
- State: Mecklenburg-Vorpommern
- District: Ludwigslust-Parchim
- Subdivisions: 7 Ortsteile

Government
  - Mayor: Reinhard Mach (Ind.)

Area
  - Total: 78.63 km^{2} (30.36 sq mi)
- Elevation: 35 m (115 ft)

Population (2025-12-31)
  - Total: 11,778
  - Density: 149.8/km^{2} (388.0/sq mi)
- Time zone: UTC+01:00 (CET)
  - Summer (DST): UTC+02:00 (CEST)
- Postal codes: 19288
- Dialling codes: 03874
- Vehicle registration: LWL
- Website: stadtludwigslust.de

Ludwigslust (German pronunciation: [luːtvɪçsˈlʊst]) is a town of Mecklenburg-Vorpommern, in northern Germany, 40 kilometres (25 mi) south of Schwerin. Since 2011 it has been part of the Ludwigslust-Parchim district.

Ludwigslust is part of the Hamburg Metropolitan Region. The former royal residential town is known for its rich heritage, especially the famed Ludwigslust Palace, known as Versailles of the North.

== History ==
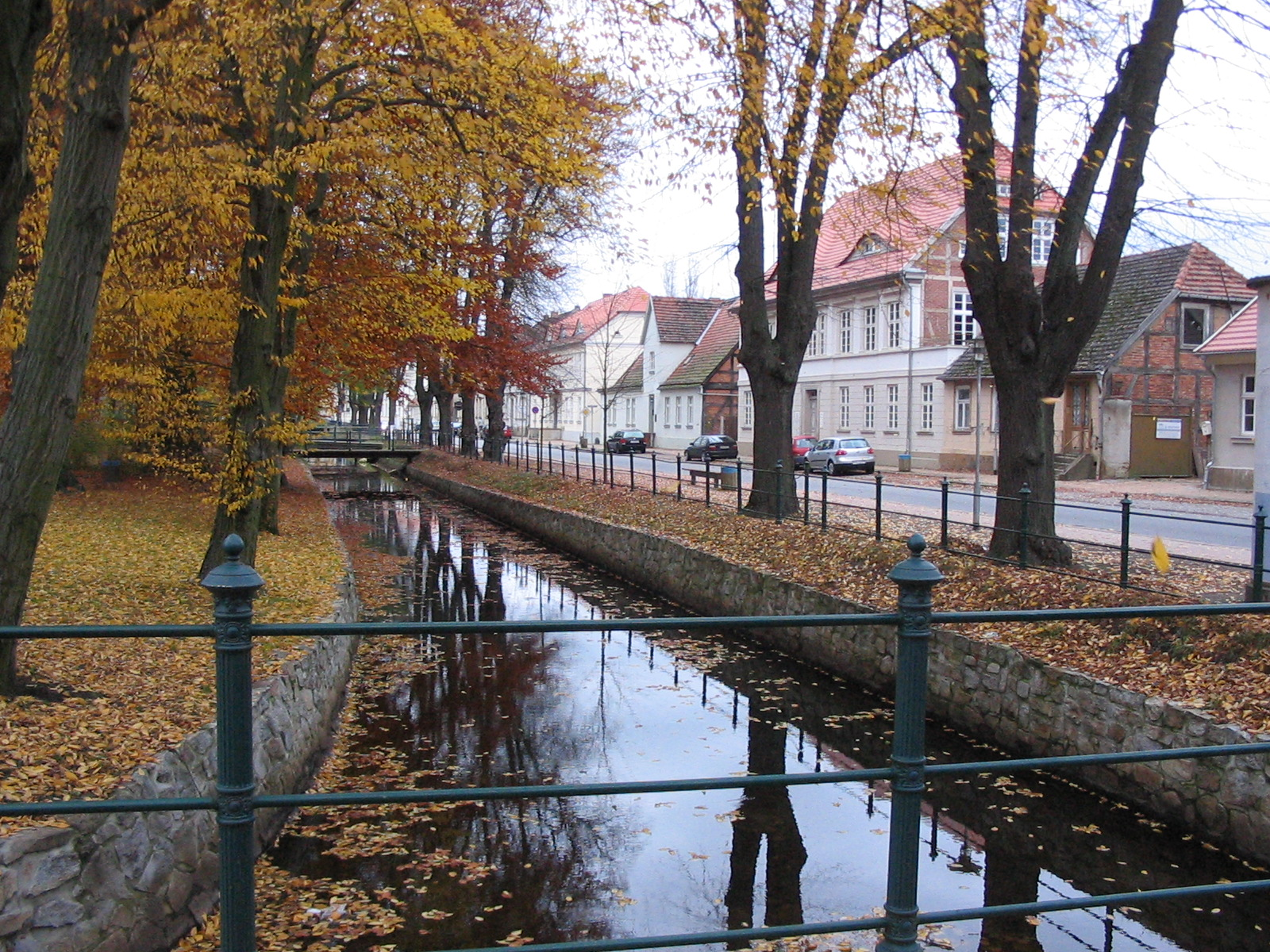
Ludwigslust

In 1724 Prince Ludwig, the son of Frederick, Duke of Mecklenburg, decided to build a hunting lodge near a small hamlet called Klenow. Later, after his succession to the Dukedom, this became his favorite residence and he named it accordingly Ludwigslust ("Ludwig's pleasure/desire"). In 1765 Ludwigslust became the capital of the duchy in place of Schwerin. The town was enlarged by a residential palace. This situation continued until 1837, when Grand Duke Paul Frederick returned the capital status to Schwerin.

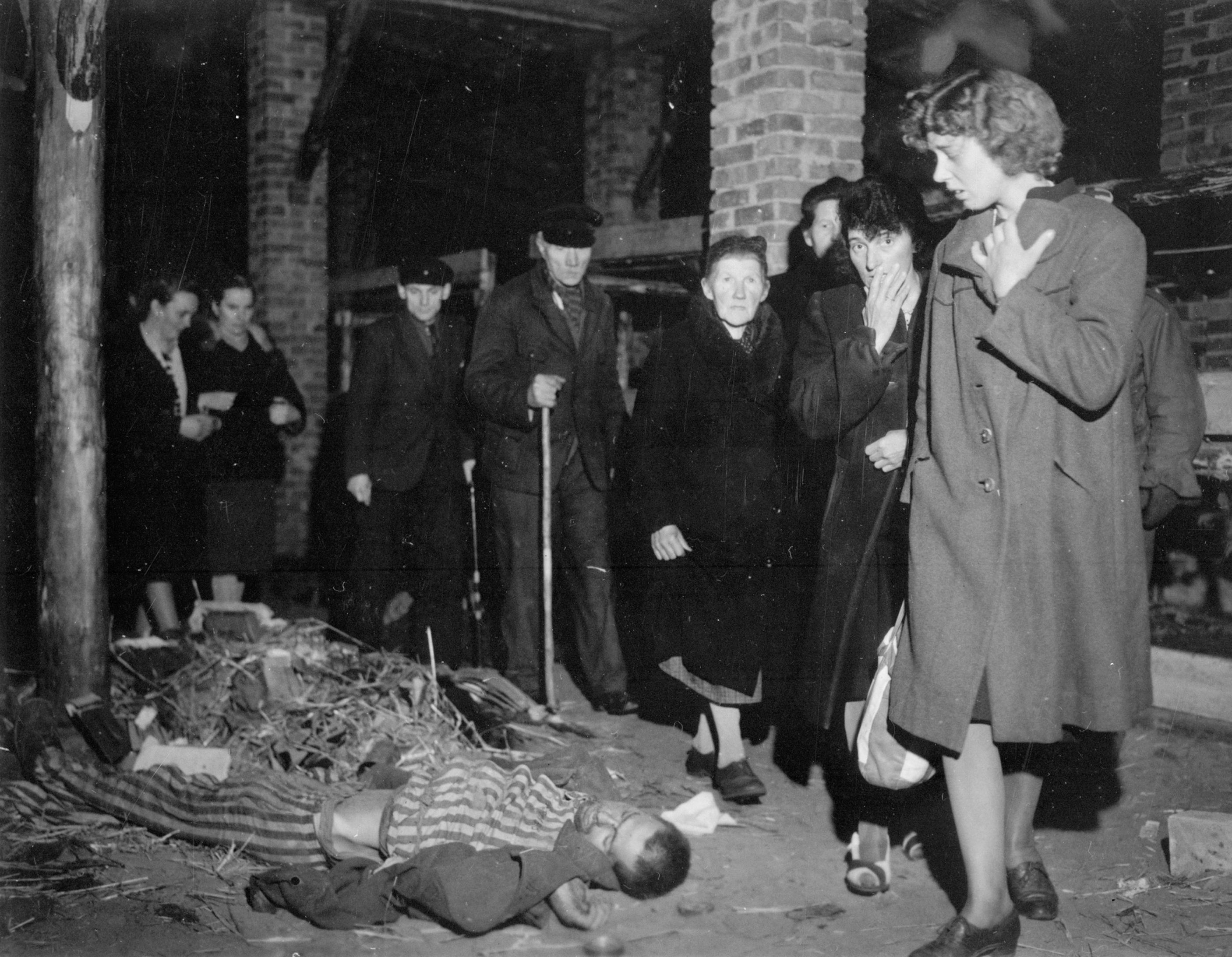
Citizens of Ludwigslust, Germany, inspect a nearby concentration camp under orders of the 82nd Airborne Division

The Wöbbelin concentration camp—sometimes referred to as Ludwigslust concentration camp—was established by the SS near the town of Ludwigslust in 1945. On 10 March 1945, Glaisin (present-day district) was the site of a stopover during the German-organised march of Polish prisoners of war from the Oflag II-D camp to the Stalag X-B camp. In April 1945, prisoners from other subcamps of the Neuengamme concentration camp were brought to Ludwigslust. At the end of World War II, as the Line of contact between Soviet and other Allied forces formed, Ludwigslust was captured by British troops initially, then handed over to American troops. After several months the US troops departed and allowed Soviet troops to enter under the Yalta agreement designating the occupation of Mecklenburg to be administered by the Soviets.

== Culture ==
=== Sights ===
- Ludwigslust Palace, a Baroque residential palace built in 1772–1776, according to plans by Johann Joachim Busch. It is called the "Little Versailles of Mecklenburg". The Palace is in the middle of the Palace Garden (Schlosspark), an extensive park (120 ha., 300 acres) in the English style, with canals, fountains and artificial cascades.
- The Protestant Stadtkirche (Municipal Church), was built between 1765 and 1770 as the Palace Chapel in Neoclassical style with Baroque sway. Its classical design, with a portico resting on six doric columns, gives the church an appearance similar to a Greek temple.

=== Sport ===
The Ludwigslust Motodrom and Speedwaystadion is a motorsport and motorcycle speedway venue located approximately 3 kilometres west of the town. The stadium has hosted important events, including a qualifying round of the Speedway World Championship in 1992 and 1993. The team MC Ludwigslust won the bronze medal in the 1988 East Germany championships.

=== Music ===
The dream pop band Die Kerzen is from Ludwigslust.

== Transport ==
- Ludwigslust railway station is served by ICE, EC, IC and RE services.

== Twin towns – sister cities ==
Ludwigslust is twinned with:

- Ahrensburg, Germany
- Muscatine, United States
- Kamskoye Ustye, Russia

== Notable people ==
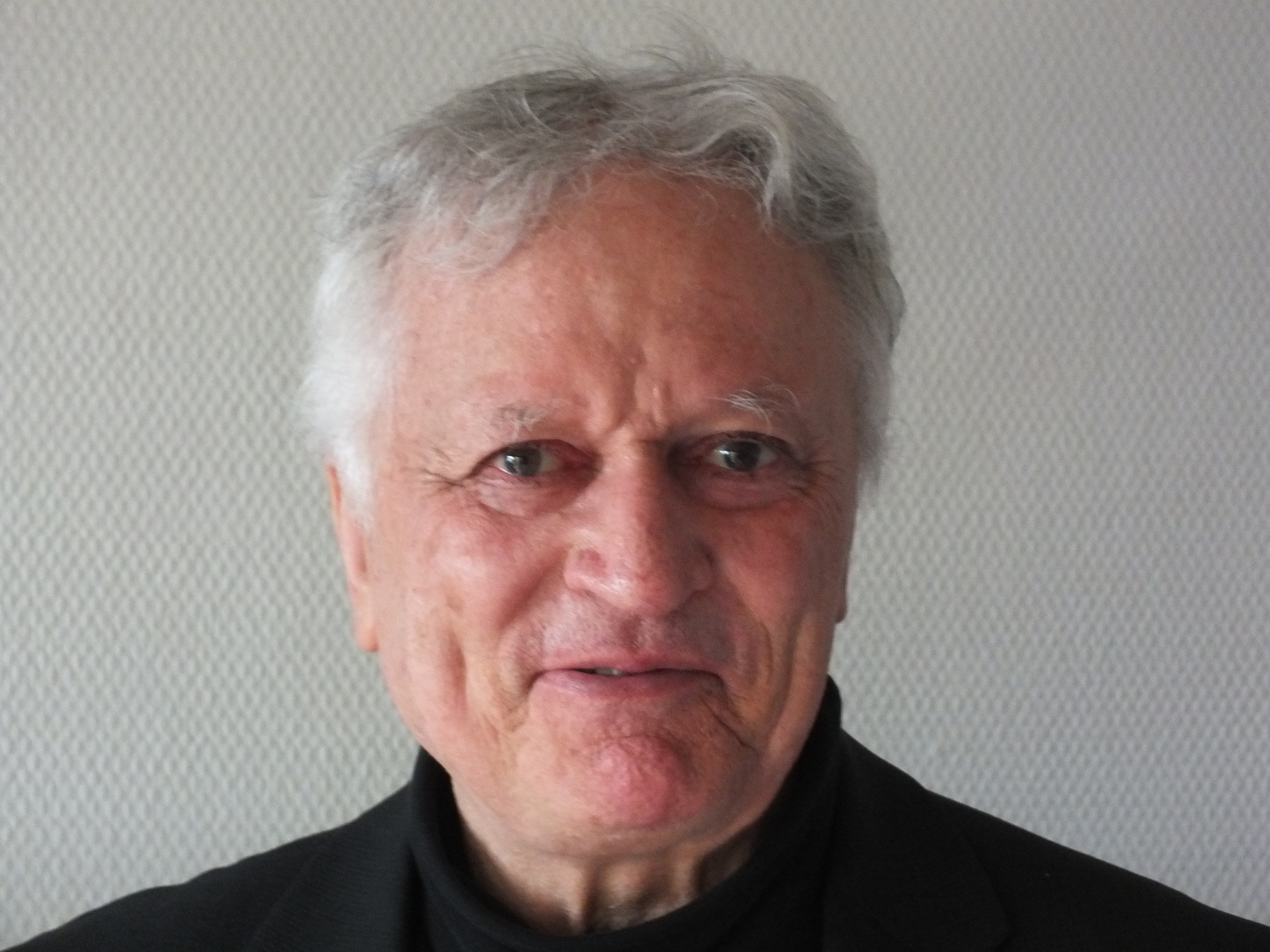
Manfred Osten, 2016

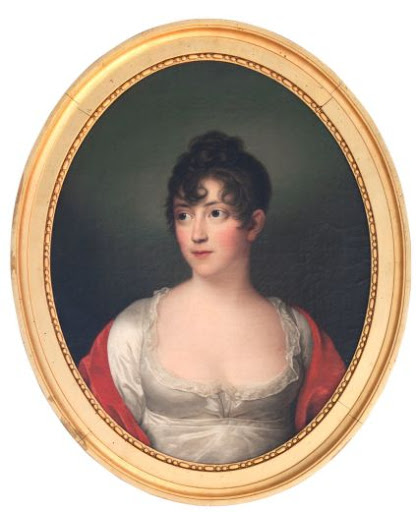
Duchess Charlotte Frederica of Mecklenburg-Schwerin, 1784

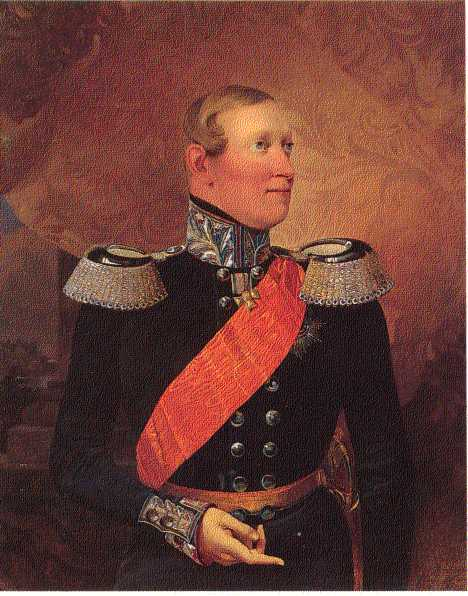
Paul Frederick, Grand Duke of Mecklenburg-Schwerin, 1800

- Franz Passow (1786–1833), a German classical scholar and lexicographer.
- Ludwig von Lützow (1793–1872), Mecklenburg statesman and politician
- Theodor Hahn (1824–1883), a German hydrotherapist, naturopath and vegetarianism activist.
- Ludwig Beissner (1843–1927), a German horticulturalist and dendrologist
- Johannes Gillhoff (1861–1930), teacher, folklorist and writer (born in Glaisin)
- Charles Allix Lavington Yate (1872–1914), English British Army officer and Victoria Cross recipient of World War I, was born in Ludwigslust, his mother's home town.
- Annelies Burmeister (1928–1988), contralto and actress.
- Manfred Osten (born 1938), poet, author, lawyer, former diplomat and cultural historian.
- Bernd Spier (born 1944), crooner, schlager singer and record producer.
- Christoph Biemann (born 1952), author, director and children's TV presenter
- Helmut Holter (born 1953), local politician

=== Artists ===
- Franz Benque (1841–1921), photographer
- Pauline Soltau (1833–1902), portrait painter and violinist
- Rudolph Suhrlandt (1781–1862), portrait painter and lithographer

=== Aristocracy ===
- Frederick Louis, Hereditary Grand Duke of Mecklenburg-Schwerin (1778–1819), Hereditary Prince of Mecklenburg, Hereditary Grand Duke of Mecklenburg in Mecklenburg-Schwerin, member of the House of Mecklenburg-Schwerin
- Duchess Charlotte Frederica of Mecklenburg-Schwerin (1784–1840), duchess of Mecklenburg; Crown Princess of Denmark
- Paul Frederick, Grand Duke of Mecklenburg-Schwerin (1800–1842), Grand Duke of Mecklenburg from 1837 to 1842.
- Frederick Francis II (1823–1883), a Prussian officer and Grand Duke of Mecklenburg-Schwerin from 1842 to 1883.
- Frederick Francis III (1851–1897), the penultimate Grand Duke of Mecklenburg-Schwerin from 1883 to 1897
- Duke Paul Frederick of Mecklenburg (1852–1923), Duke of Mecklenburg, General of the Cavalry
- Duchess Marie of Mecklenburg-Schwerin (1854–1920), Grand Duchess of Russia
- Duke Christian Louis of Mecklenburg (1912–1996), nobleman, head of the house Mecklenburg

=== Sport ===
- Paul Rudolf von Bilguer (1815–1840), a German chess master and chess theoretician.
- Brigitte Kiesler (1924–2013), gymnast; competed in seven events at the 1952 Summer Olympics
- Andreas Zülow (born 1965), lightweight boxer; gold medallist at the 1988 Summer Olympics
- Birgit Jerschabek (born 1969), long-distance runner
- Bastian Reinhardt (born 1975), footballer, played over 280 games
