= Military liaison missions =

Stabilizing Cold War activity in Germany

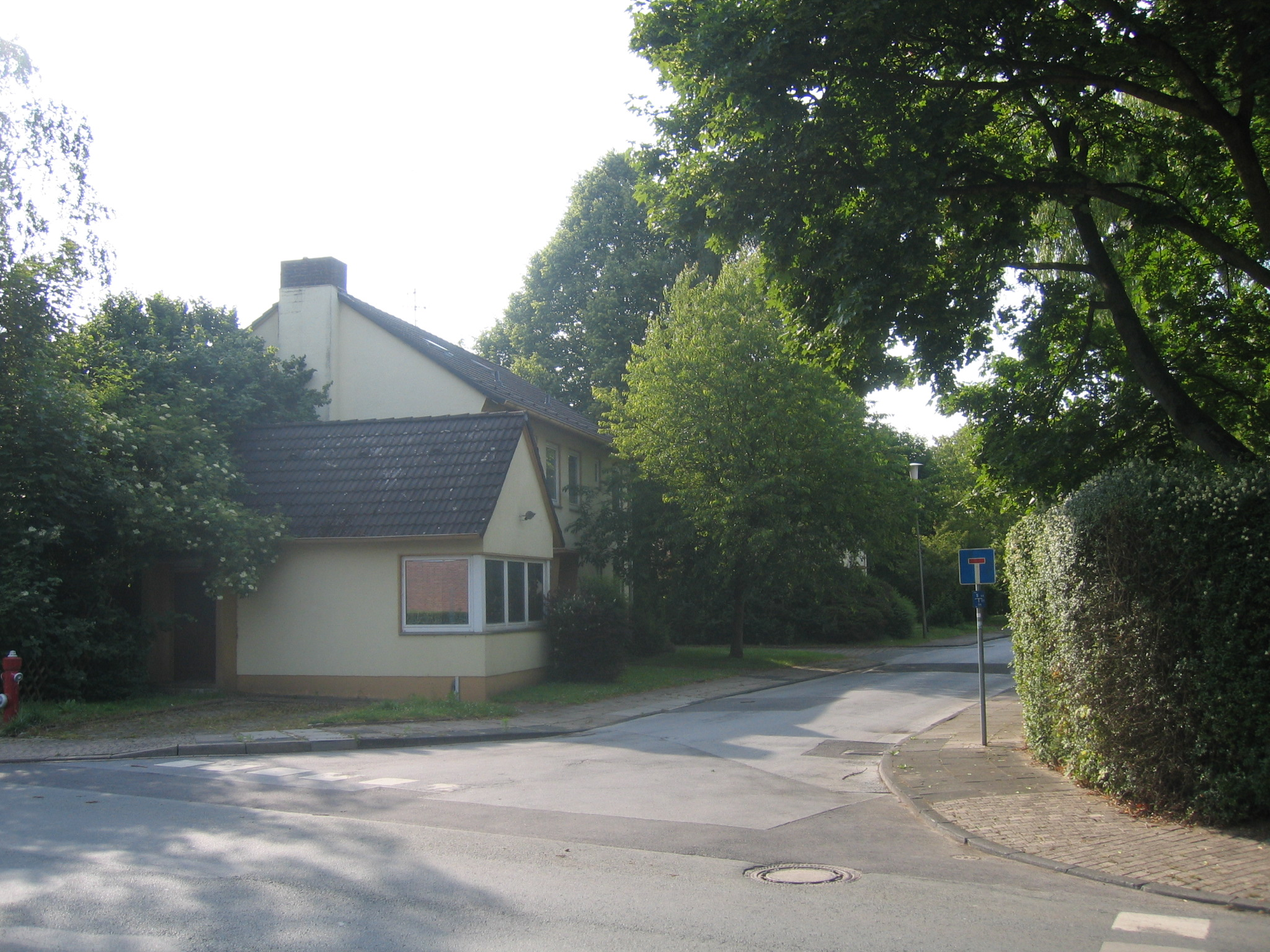
This former British post marks the entry to former SOXMIS in Bünde, West Germany, where the Soviets lived within a British married officers' compound.

Areas permanently out of bounds to Soviet Military Missions to British Zone of Occupation in West Germany

The military liaison missions arose from reciprocal agreements formed between the Western allied nations (the United States, the United Kingdom and France) and the Soviet Union, shortly after the end of the Second World War. The missions were active from 1946 until 1990.

The agreements between the allied nations and the Soviet Union permitted the deployment of small numbers of military intelligence personnel – together with associated support staff – in each other's territory in Germany, ostensibly for the purposes of monitoring and furthering better relationships between the Soviet and Western occupation forces. The British, French and American missions matched the size of the counterpart Soviet missions into West Germany (the nominal post-war British, French and American zones of occupation). The MLMs also played an intelligence-gathering role. The MLM teams were based in West Berlin but started their "tours" from the national mission houses in Potsdam in matte-olive-drab heavy cars. The Mission teams on a tour frequently comprised one officer accompanied by an NCO and a driver. The missions persisted throughout the Cold War period and ended in 1990, just prior to German reunification. The missions were:

- British Commanders'-in-Chief Mission to the Soviet Forces in Germany (BRIXMIS);
- La Mission Militaire Française de Liaison (MMFL);
- U.S. Military Liaison Mission (USMLM);
- and their reciprocal Soviet missions (SOXMIS/SMLM).

The British–Soviet missions were the first to be established (16 September 1946), under the terms of the Robertson–Malinin Agreement (the respective commanders-in-chief). It also had the largest contingent of personnel, with 31 accredited team members. Later agreements with the US (Huebner–Malinin, March 1947) and France (Noiret–Malinin, April 1947) had significantly fewer permitted personnel, possibly because the Allied powers did not want large Soviet missions operating in their zones and vice versa.

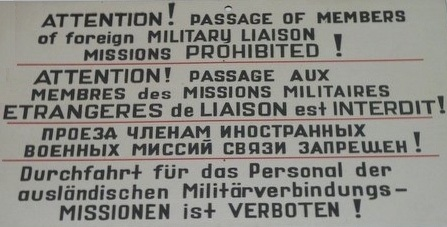
Typical sign intended to prevent Missions from entering sensitive areas in East Germany

The Allied liaison missions, having quasi-diplomatic status, were relatively free to roam around East Germany, save for specifically designated permanent and temporary restricted areas. They were largely 'untouchable' either by the law or military personnel. However, a small number of team members were injured or killed in accidents or 'incidents', which gave rise to significant military and political tensions.

Little is publicly documented about the Soviet missions.

Although not widely known to the general public, the MLMs played a significant intelligence-gathering role during the Cold War. They also had a significant role in confirming that preparations for offensive action were not under way, thus reducing tension.

Probably the most notable incident involving the American MLM was the death of Major Arthur D. Nicholson, a U.S. MLM Tour Officer. He was killed on March 23, 1985, shot by Soviet Army Sergeant Aleksandr Ryabtsev, and was considered the last American casualty of the Cold War, and the only U.S. MLM Officer to die in the course of duty, though other British and French tour personnel had died earlier. After the Berlin Wall fell in 1989, Nicholson's death was honored on the floor of both houses of the United States Congress, with a speech that was read into the official record.

== See also ==
- Potsdam Conference
