= Karl Eduard Rothschuh =

German cardiac physiologist, medical historian, and medical philosopher

Karl Eduard Rothschuh (July 6, 1908, Aachen – September 3, 1984, Münster) was a German cardiac physiologist, medical historian, and medical philosopher. He studied medicine at Hamburg, Frankfurt am Main, Munich, Vienna, and finally Berlin, where he was award the Doctor of Medicine degree in 1937. He was a professor of physiology until 1960 and of history of medicine until 1973 at the University of Münster. He is considered to be an important contributor to 20th-century German medical philosophy. He was elected to the German National Academy of Sciences Leopoldina in 1969.
