= Mecklenburg =

Historical region of Germany

- Historical region of Germany
- Flag Coat of arms

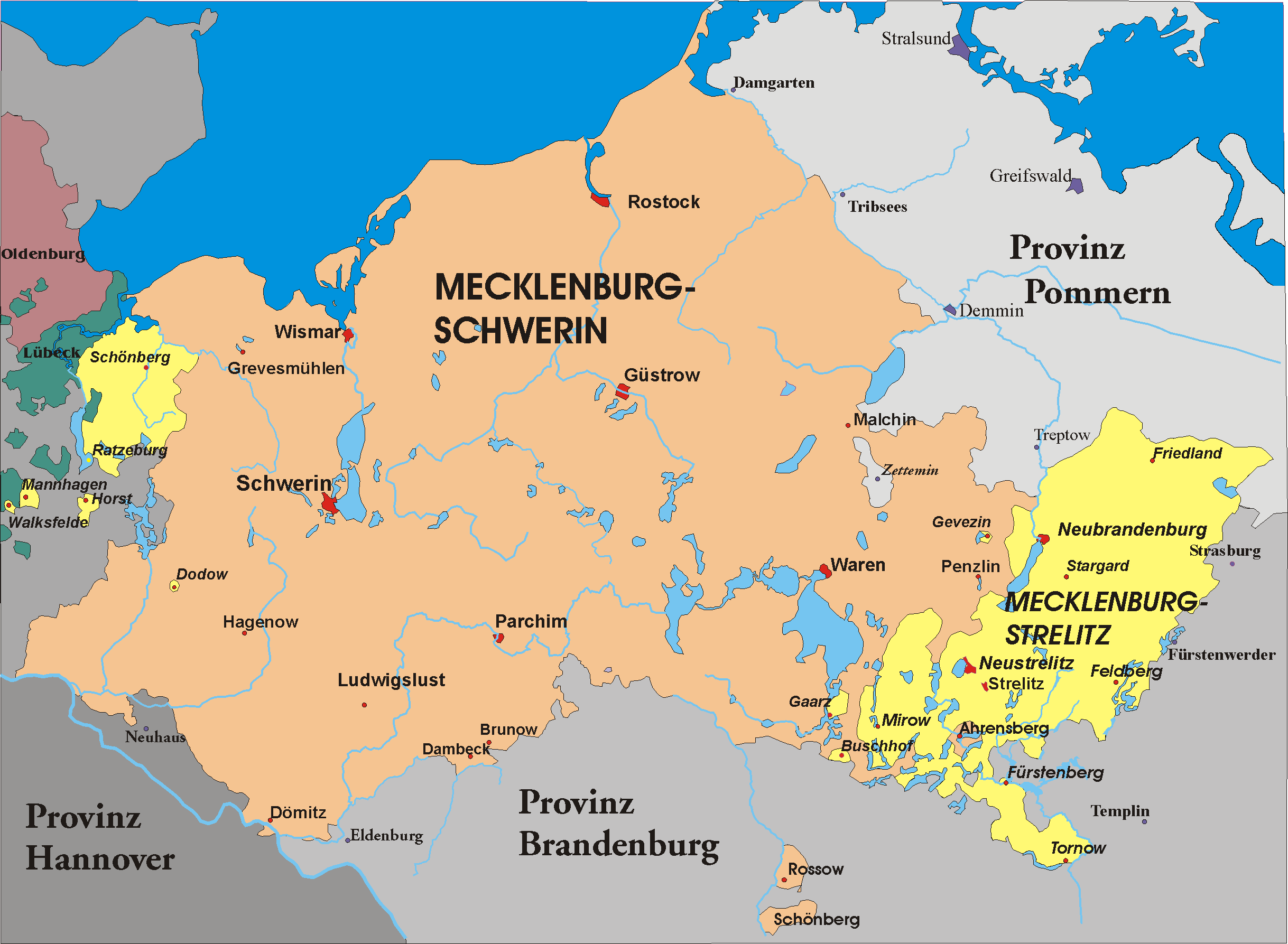
- Mecklenburg, divided between Mecklenburg-Schwerin and Mecklenburg-Strelitz, from 1866 to 1934.
- Coordinates: 53°50′14″N 11°28′16″E
- Largest city: Rostock
- Demonym: Mecklenburgian • Mecklenburger

Mecklenburg (from Mękel(n)borg [ˈmɛːkəl(n)bɔrx]) is a historical region in what is now northern Germany comprising the western and larger part of the federal-state Mecklenburg-Western Pomerania. The largest cities of the region are Rostock, Schwerin, Neubrandenburg, Wismar and Güstrow.

The name Mecklenburg derives from a castle named Mikilenburg (Old Saxon for "big castle", hence its translation into Neo-Latin and Greek as Megalopolis), located between the cities of Schwerin and Wismar. In Slavic languages it was known as Veligrad, which also means "big castle". It was the ancestral seat of the House of Mecklenburg; for a time the area was divided into Mecklenburg-Schwerin and Mecklenburg-Strelitz among the same dynasty.

Linguistically Mecklenburgers retain and use many features of Low German vocabulary or phonology.

The adjective for the region is Mecklenburgian or Mecklenburgish (German: mecklenburgisch); inhabitants are called Mecklenburgians or Mecklenburgers (German: Mecklenburger).

== Geography ==
Mecklenburg is known for its mostly flat countryside. Much of the terrain is boggy, with ponds, marshes and fields as common features, with small forests interspersed. The terrain changes as one moves north towards the Baltic Sea.

Under the peat of Mecklenburg are sometimes found deposits of ancient lava flows. Traditionally, at least in the countryside, the stone from these flows is cut and used in the construction of homes, often in joint use with cement, brick and wood, forming a unique look to the exterior of country houses.

Mecklenburg has productive farming, but the land is most suitable for grazing for livestock.

=== List of urban centers in Mecklenburg ===
Town/ municipality	District	Population as of December 31, 2012	Image
Rostock	district-free city	206,011 (12-31-2015)	Rostock-Warnemünde
Schwerin	district-free city	91,264	Schwerin Palace (seat of the state parliament of Mecklenburg-Vorpommern
Neubrandenburg	Mecklenburgische Seenplatte	63,509	Neubrandenburg im Morgennebel, by Caspar David Friedrich
Wismar	Nordwestmecklenburg	42,433	Wismar waterworks
Güstrow	Rostock	28,586	Güstrow renaissance palace
Neustrelitz	Mecklenburgische Seenplatte	20,322	Royal Church Neustrelitz
Waren (Müritz)	Mecklenburgische Seenplatte	21,074	The Müritzeum aquarium in Waren
Parchim	Ludwigslust-Parchim	17,174	Parchim post office
Ludwigslust	Ludwigslust-Parchim	11,998	Ludwigslust baroque palace ("Versaille of the North")
Bad Doberan	Rostock	11,427	Brick Gothic Doberan Minster
Hagenow	Ludwigslust-Parchim	11,324	Old town and church of Hagenow
Grevesmühlen	Nordwestmecklenburg	10,621	Windmill of Grevesmühlen
Boizenburg/Elbe	Ludwigslust-Parchim	10,169	Boizenburg moat around the old town
Teterow	Rostock	8,733	Teterow Bergring race track
Malchin	Mecklenburgische Seenplatte	7,657	Kalensches Tor, city gate in Malchin

== History ==
=== Early history ===
Mecklenburg is the site of many prehistoric dolmen tombs. Its earliest organised inhabitants have had Slavic origins. By no later than 100 BC the area had been populated by pre-Christian Germanic peoples.

The traditional symbol of Mecklenburg, the grinning steer's head (Low German: Ossenkopp, lit.: 'oxen's head', with osse being a synonym for steer and bull in Middle Low German), with an attached hide and a crown above, may have originated from this period. It represents what early peoples would have worn, i.e. a steer's head as a helmet, with the hide hanging down the back to protect the neck from the sun, and overall as a way to instill fear in the enemy.

From the 7th through the 12th centuries, Mecklenburg was inhabited by Western Slavs who migrated there from Poland and north-western Ukraine. Among them were the Obotrites and other tribes that Frankish sources referred to as "Wends". The 11th-century founder of the Mecklenburger dynasty of Dukes and later Grand Dukes, which lasted until 1918, was Nyklot of the Obotrites.

In the late 12th century, Henry the Lion, Duke of the Saxons, reconquered the region, took oaths from its local lords, and Christianized its people, in a precursor to the Northern Crusades. From the 12th to 14th centuries, large numbers of Germans and Flemings settled the area (Ostsiedlung), importing German law and improved agricultural techniques. The Wends who survived all warfare and devastation of the centuries before, including invasions of and expeditions into Saxony, Denmark and Liutizic areas as well as internal conflicts, were assimilated in the centuries thereafter. However, elements of certain names and words used in Mecklenburg speak to the lingering Slavic influence. An example would be the city of Schwerin, which was originally called Zuarin in Slavic. Another example is the town of Bresegard, the 'gard' portion of the town name deriving from the Slavic word 'grad', meaning city or town.

Since the 12th century, the territory remained stable and relatively independent of its neighbours; one of the few German territories for which this is true. During the Reformation, the Duke in Schwerin would convert to Protestantism and so would follow the Duchy of Mecklenburg in 1549.

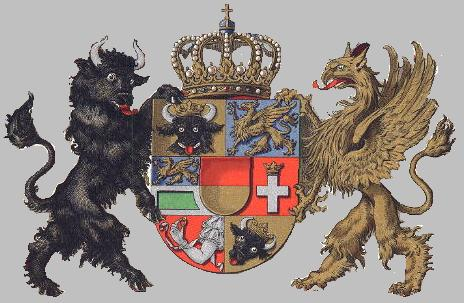
Historical 7-field coat of arms, symbolizing the seven lordships of Mecklenburg: The duchy of Mecklenburg, the princedoms (former dioceses) of Schwerin and Ratzeburg, the county of Schwerin and the Herrschafts (lordships) of Rostock, Werle and Stargard.

=== History, 1621–1933 ===
Like many German territories, Mecklenburg was sometimes partitioned and re-partitioned among different members of the ruling dynasty. In 1621 it was divided into the two duchies of Mecklenburg-Schwerin and Mecklenburg-Güstrow. With the extinction of the Güstrow line in 1701, the Güstrow lands were redivided, part going to the Duke of Mecklenburg-Schwerin, and part going to the new line of Mecklenburg-Strelitz.

In 1815, the two Mecklenburgian duchies were raised to Grand Duchies, the Grand Duchy of Mecklenburg-Schwerin and the Grand Duchy of Mecklenburg-Strelitz, and subsequently existed separately as such in Germany under enlightened but absolute rule (constitutions being granted on the eve of World War I) until the revolution of 1918. Life in Mecklenburg could be quite harsh. Practices such as having to ask for permission from the Grand Duke to get married, or having to apply for permission to emigrate, would linger late into the history of Mecklenburg (i.e. 1918), long after such practices had been abandoned in other German areas. As late as the latter half of the 19th century, the Grand Duke personally owned half of the countryside.

The last Duke abdicated in 1918, as monarchies fell throughout Europe. The Duke's ruling house reigned in Mecklenburg uninterrupted (except for two years) from its incorporation into the Holy Roman Empire until 1918. From 1918 to 1933, the duchies were free states in the Weimar Republic.

=== History since 1934 ===
After three centuries of partition, Mecklenburg was united on 1 January 1934 by the German government. During World War II the Wehrmacht assigned Mecklenburg and Pomerania to Wehrkreis II under the command of General der Infanterie Werner Kienitz, with the headquarters at Stettin. Mecklenburg was assigned to an Area headquartered at Schwerin, which was responsible for military units in Schwerin, Rostock, Parchim, and Neustrelitz.

After World War II, the Soviet government occupying eastern Germany merged Mecklenburg with the smaller neighbouring region of Western Pomerania (German Vorpommern) to form the state of Mecklenburg-Vorpommern. Mecklenburg contributed about two-thirds of the geographical size of the new state and the majority of its population. Also, the new state became temporary or permanent home for many refugees expelled from former German territories seized by the Soviet Union and Poland after the war. The Soviets changed the name from "Mecklenburg-Western Pomerania" to "Mecklenburg" in 1947.

In 1952, the East German government ended the independent existence of Mecklenburg, creating three districts ("Bezirke") out of its territory: Rostock, Schwerin and Neubrandenburg.

During German reunification in 1990, the state of Mecklenburg-Vorpommern was revived, and is now one of the 16 states of the Federal Republic of Germany.

== Coat of arms of the duchies of Mecklenburg ==
Coat of arms used by both duchies, mid 19th century.

The House of Mecklenburg was founded by Niklot, prince of the Obotrites, Chizzini and Circipani on the Baltic Sea, who died in 1160. His Christian progeny was recognized as prince of the Holy Roman Empire 1170 and Duke of Mecklenburg 8 July 1348. On 27 February 1658 the ducal house divided in two branches: Mecklenburg-Schwerin and Mecklenburg-Strelitz.

The flag of both Mecklenburg duchies is traditionally made of the colours blue, yellow and red. The sequence however changed more than once in the past 300 years. In 1813 the duchies used yellow-red-blue. 23 December 1863 for Schwerin and 4 January 1864 for Strelitz blue-yellow-red was ordered. Mecklenburg-Schwerin however used white instead of yellow for flags on sea by law of 24 March 1855.

Siebmachers Wappenbuch gives therefore (?) blue-white-red for Schwerin and blue-yellow-red for Strelitz. According to this source, the grand ducal house of Schwerin used a flag of 3.75 to 5.625 M with the middle arms on a white quadrant (1.75 M) in the middle.

The middle arms show the shield of Mecklenburg as arranged in the 17th century. The county of Schwerin in the middle and in the quartering Mecklenburg (bull's head with hide), Rostock (griffin), principality of Schwerin (griffin surmounting green rectangle), Ratzeburg (cross surmounted by crown), Stargard (arm with hand holding ring) and Wenden (bull's head). The shield is supported by a bull and a griffin and surmounted by a royal crown.

The dukes of Strelitz used according to Siebmachers the blue-yellow-red flag with just the (oval) shield of Mecklenburg in the yellow band.

Ströhl in 1897 and Bulgaria show another arrangement: The grand-duke of Mecklenburg-Schwerin flows a flag (4:5) with the arms of the figures from the shield of arms.

The former Schwerin standard with the white quadrant is now ascribed to the grand dukes of Strelitz. Ströhl mentions a flag for the grand ducal house by law of 23 December 1863 with the middle arms in the yellow band. And he mentions a special sea flag, the same but with a white middle band. 'Berühmte Fahnen' shows furthermore a standard for grand duchess Alexandra of Mecklenburg-Schwerin, princess of Hannover (1882–1963), showing her shield and that of Mecklenburg joined by the order of the Wendic Crown in a white oval. On sea the yellow band in her flag was of course white. The princes (dukes) of Mecklenburg-Schwerin had according to this source their own standard, showing the griffin of Rostock.

== Economy ==
=== Agriculture ===
A flat landscape, Mecklenburg is known for its farmlands—which produces quinoa, wheat, barley and maize—and its animal husbandry, notably its cattle and the Mecklenburger breed of horse. Recently, given the upheavals and environmental disruptions created by globalisation, German farmers have become concerned about potentially invasive species such as the Greater rhea and the Asian hornet.

=== Tourism ===
Mecklenburg has seen a huge increase in tourism since German reunification in 1990, particularly with its beaches and seaside resorts at the Baltic Sea ("German Riviera", Warnemünde, Boltenhagen, Heiligendamm, Kühlungsborn, Rerik and others), the Mecklenburg Lakeland (Mecklenburgische Seenplatte) and the Mecklenburg Switzerland (Mecklenburgische Schweiz) with their pristine nature, the old Hanseatic towns of Rostock, Greifswald, Stralsund and Wismar (the latter two being World Heritage) well known for their medieval Brick Gothic buildings, and the former royal residences of Schwerin, Güstrow, Ludwigslust and Neustrelitz.

== Notable Mecklenburgers ==
- Gebhard Leberecht von Blücher (1742–1819), Prussian army leader
- Friederike Krüger (1789–1848), female soldier in the Napoleonic Wars
- Ludwig Jacoby (1813–1874), Methodist clergyman and author
- Paul Rudolf von Bilguer (1815–1840), a German chess master and chess theoretician
- Heinrich Schliemann (1822–1890), classical archaeologist
- Siegfried Marcus (1831–1898), automobile pioneer
- Gottlob Frege (1848–1925) a German philosopher, logician, and mathematician
- Michael Buddrus (born 1957), historian
- Jan Ullrich (born 1973) a German former professional road bicycle racer

=== Royalty ===
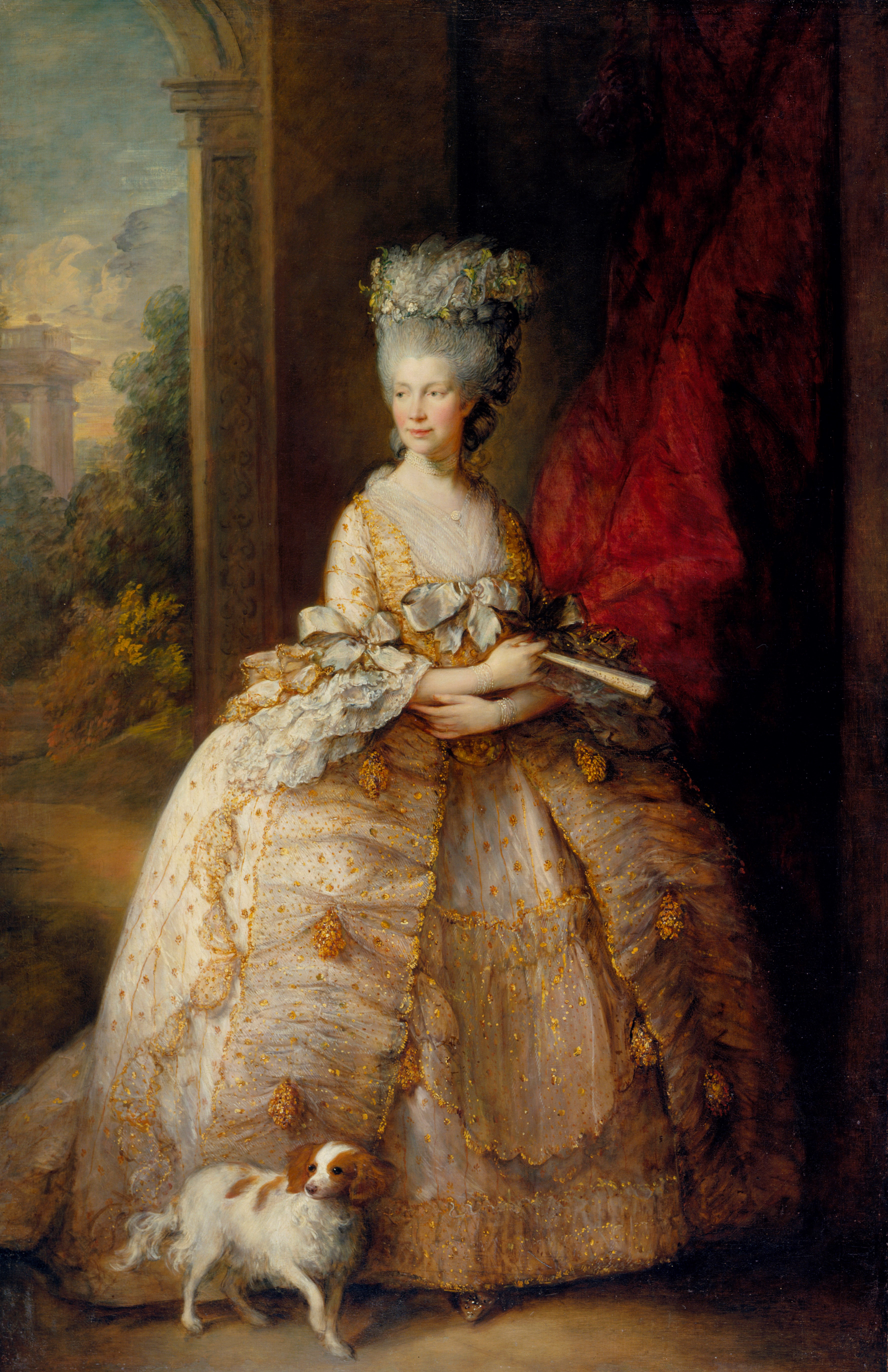
Queen Charlotte, 1781

- Albert II, Duke of Mecklenburg (ca. 1318–1379), feudal lord in northern Germany
- Adolphus Frederick II (1658–1708), reigning duke of the Mecklenburg-Strelitz
- Karl Leopold, Duke of Mecklenburg-Schwerin (1678–1747), reigning duke of Mecklenburg-Schwerin
- Christian Ludwig II, Duke of Mecklenburg-Schwerin (1683–1756), duke of Mecklenburg-Schwerin
- Sophia Louise of Mecklenburg-Schwerin (1685–1735), Queen of Prussia
- Ludwig, Hereditary Prince of Mecklenburg-Schwerin (1725–1778), hereditary prince of Mecklenburg-Schwerin
- Charlotte of Mecklenburg-Strelitz (1744–1818), wife of George III and grandmother of Queen Victoria
- Alexandrine of Mecklenburg-Schwerin (1879–1952), wife of Christian X of Denmark
- Duchess Cecilie of Mecklenburg-Schwerin (1886–1954), last Crown Princess of the German Empire
- Friedrich Franz, Hereditary Grand Duke of Mecklenburg-Schwerin (1910–2001), heir apparent to the Grand Duchy of Mecklenburg-Schwerin

=== Artists ===
- Rudolph Suhrlandt (1781–1862), portrait painter and lithographer
- Carl Eggers (1787–1863), history painter
- Wilhelm Langschmidt (1805–1866), painter and South African pioneer
- Fritz Reuter (1810–1874), poet and novelist
- Johannes Gillhoff (1861–1930), teacher and author
- Ernst Barlach (1870–1938), expressionist sculptor
- Marianne Hoppe (1909–2002), actress
- Barbara Klünder (1919–1988), ceramist and painter
- Christiane Klonz (born 1969), pianist and composer
- Oliver Riedel (born 1971), bassist of Rammstein
- Marten Laciny (born 1982), rapper

== See also ==
- Mecklenburg-Vorpommern
- Duchy of Mecklenburg-Schwerin
- Duchy of Mecklenburg-Strelitz
- List of artists from Mecklenburg
- List of rulers of Mecklenburg
- Mecklenburg County, North Carolina
- Mecklenburg County, Virginia
- Pomerania
- Western Pomerania

== Literature ==
- Grewolls, Grete (2011). Wer war wer in Mecklenburg und Vorpommern. Das Personenlexikon (in German). Rostock: Hinstorff Verlag. ISBN 978-3-356-01301-6.
