= Knyaz =

Historical Slavic title

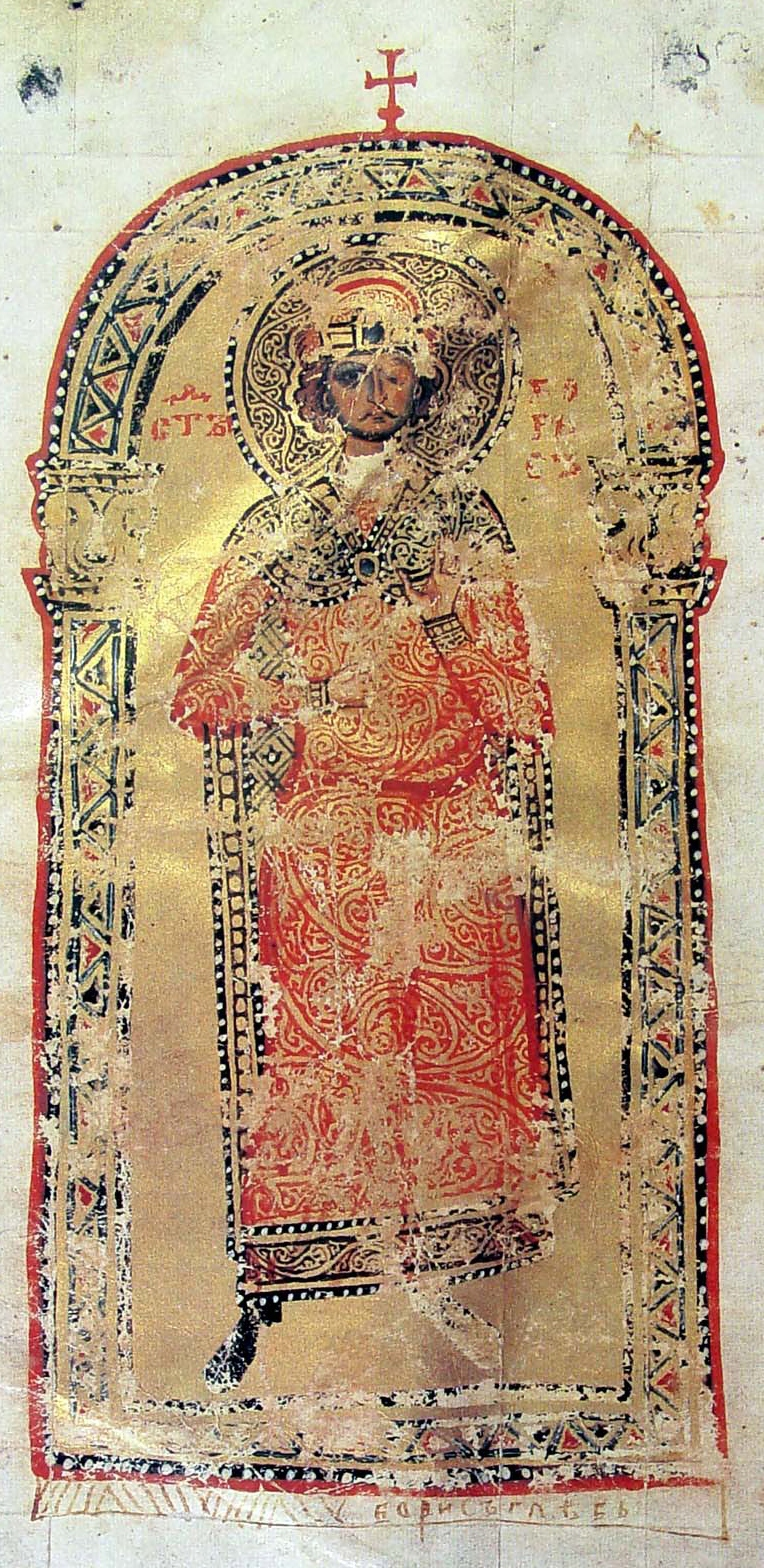
Until Boris I (852–889), the title of the Bulgarian monarchs was knyaz (Кнѣзъ). His son, Simeon I (893–927), adopted the title tsar (emperor), which became the title of the subsequent Bulgarian rulers.

A knyaz, also knez, knjaz, kniaź or kniaz (Church Slavonic: кънѧѕь, romanized: kŭnędzĭ), is a historical Slavic title, used both as a royal and noble title in different times. It is usually translated into English as 'prince', 'king' or 'duke', depending on specific historical context and the potentially known Latin equivalents at the time; the word was originally derived from the common Germanic *kuningaz ('king').

Feminine forms of the word may be divided into two groups:

- "Princess", be it princess consort (wife of a reigning prince), princess regnant (reigning princess suo jure), or princess regent (reigning on behalf of an underage prince, usually her son after her husband's death)
  - Belarusian: kniahinia (княгіня)
  - Bulgarian and Russian: knyaginya (княгиня)
  - Polish: kniaginia
  - Slovene, Serbo-Croatian, and Macedonian: kneginja (in Serbian and Macedonian Cyrillic: кнегиња)
  - Ukrainian: knyahynya (княгиня)
- "Daughter of the prince"
  - Belarusian: kniazioŭna (князёўна)
  - Polish: kniaziówna
  - Russian: knyazhna (княжна; the son of a knyaz is knyazhich (княжич in its old form).
  - Ukrainian: knyazivna (князівна).

The title is pronounced and written similarly in different European languages. In Serbo-Croatian and some West Slavic languages, the word has later come to denote "lord", and in Czech, Polish and Slovak also came to mean "priest" (kněz, ksiądz, kňaz) as well as "prince/duke" (knez, kníže, książę, knieža). In Sorbian it means simply "Mister" (from "Master". Compare French monsieur from mon sieur "my lord"), and the Catholic title "monsignor" for a priest. Today the term knez is still used as the most common translation of "prince" in Slovenian, Bosnian, Croatian and Serbian literature. Knez is also found as a surname in former Yugoslavia.

== Etymology ==
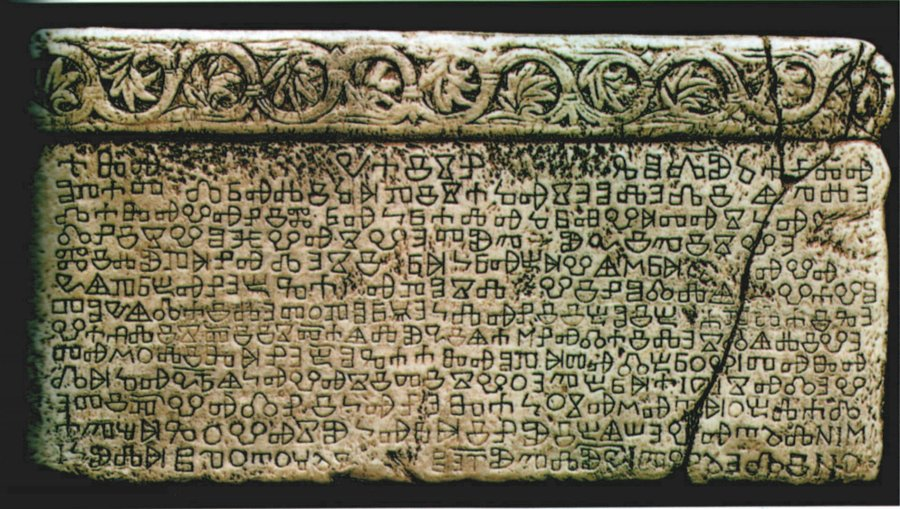
The title knez appeared in the early 12th-century Glagolitic Baška tablet inscription, found on the island of Krk, Croatia.

The word is ultimately a cognate of the English King, the German König, and the Swedish Konung. The proto-Slavic form was *kъnędzь, kŭnędzĭ; Church Slavonic: кънѧѕь, kŭnędzĭ; Bulgarian: княз, knyaz; Old East Slavic: князь, knyazĭ; Polish: książę; Serbo-Croatian Latin: knez / Serbo-Croatian Cyrillic: кнез; Czech: kníže; Slovak: knieža; etc. It is generally considered to be an early borrowing from Proto-Germanic kuningaz, a form also borrowed by Finnish and Estonian (kuningas).

The rulers of the Duchy of Poland bore the title of książę, which was rendered as dux or princeps in Latin, and later adopted krol (from Karl, the name of Charlemagne) and its equivalent rex following Bolesław I's coronation in 1025. Similarly, the ruler of the Duchy of Lithuania, called kunigaikštis (also derived from kuningaz) in Polish, was called magnus dux instead of the Polish word for "king", karalius (also derived from Karl). Medieval German records, however, translated knyaz as koning (king) until at least the 15th century.

== Middle Ages ==
The meaning of the term changed over the course of history. Initially the term was used to denote the chieftain of a Slavic tribe. Later, with the development of feudal statehood, it became the title of a ruler of a state, and among East Slavs (Russian: княжество (knyazhestvo), Ukrainian: князівство, romanized: kniazivstvo) traditionally translated as duchy or principality, for example, of Kievan Rus'.

=== In Medieval Bulgaria ===
In First Bulgarian Empire, Boris I of Bulgaria (852–889) changed his title to knyaz after his conversion to Christianity in 864, abandoning the pagan title 'khan' of his predecessors. The new titles were applied to his sons Vladimir Rasate (889-893) and Simeon I (893–927), however knyaz Simeon took the higher title of tsar soon in 913.

According to Florin Curta, the primary sources have a variety of names for the rulers of the Bulgars before christianisation - such as including ‘rex’, ‘basileus’ and ‘khagan’. Omurtag (814–831) and his son Malamir (831–836) are mentioned in inscriptions as 'kanasubigi'. However, secondary sources are almost always 'khan'.

=== In Kievan Rus' ===
In Kievan Rus', as the degree of centralization grew, the ruler acquired the title Velikii Knyaz (Великий Князь) (translated as Grand Prince or Grand Duke, see Russian Grand Dukes). He ruled a Russian: Великое Княжеcтво, romanized: Velikoye Knyazhestvo or Ukrainian: Велике Князiвcтво, romanized: Velyke Knyazivstvo (Grand Duchy), while a ruler of its vassal constituent (udel, udelnoe knyazivstvo or volost) was called udelny knyaz or simply knyaz.

When Kievan Rus' became fragmented in the 13th century, the title Knyaz continued to be used in East Slavic states, including Kiev's Principality, Chernigov's Principality, Novgorod Republic and its princes, Pereiaslavl Principality, Vladimir-Suzdal, Muscovy, Tver's Principality, Kingdom of Ruthenia, and in the Grand Duchy of Lithuania.

== Russia ==
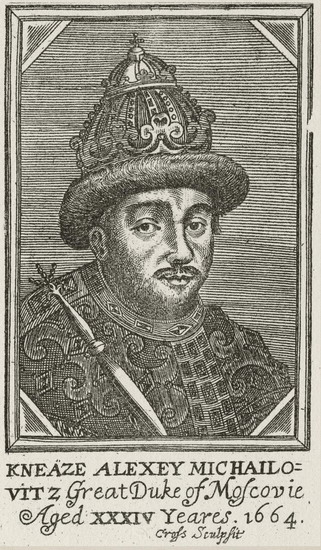
Kneaze Alexey Michailovitz, 1664 (Tsar Alexis I of Russia)

As the Tsardom of Russia gained dominion over much of former Kievan Rus', velikii kniaz (великий князь) (Great Kniaz) Ivan IV of Russia in 1547 was crowned as Tsar. From the mid-18th century onwards, the title Velikii Kniaz was revived to refer to (male-line) sons and grandsons of Russian Emperors. See titles for Tsar's family for details.

Kniaz (Russian: князь, IPA: [ˈknʲæsʲ]) continued as a hereditary title of Russian nobility patrilineally descended from Rurik (e.g., Belozersky, Belosselsky-Belozersky, Repnin, Gorchakov) or Gediminas (e.g., Galitzine, Troubetzkoy). Members of Rurikid or Gedyminid families were called princes when they ruled tiny quasi-sovereign medieval principalities. After their demesnes were absorbed by Muscovy, they settled at the Moscow court and were authorised to continue with their princely titles.

From the 18th century onwards, the title was occasionally granted by the Tsar, for the first time by Peter the Great to his associate Alexander Menshikov, and then by Catherine the Great to her lover Grigory Potemkin. After 1801, with the incorporation of Georgia into the Russian Empire, various titles of numerous local nobles were controversially rendered in Russian as "kniazes".

Finally, within the Russian Empire of 1809–1917, Finland was officially called Grand Principality of Finland (Finnish: Suomen suuriruhtinaskunta, Swedish: Storfurstendömet Finland, Russian: Великое Княжество Финляндское, romanized: Velikoye Knyazhestvo Finlyandskoye).

Translation issues
Russian	English analogs, approximately		English analogs after the 18th century
kniaz (князь, [ˈknʲæsʲ])	king	duke	prince
kniaginia (княгиня, [knʲɪˈginʲə])	queen	duchess	princess
kniazhich (княжич, [ˈknʲaʐɨt͡ɕ])	prince (son of a king)	son of a duke	prince (son of a prince)
kniazhna (княжна, [knʲɪˈʐna])	princess (daughter of a king)	daughter of a duke	princess (daughter of a prince)

== Polish-Lithuanian Commonwealth ==
As noted above, the title knyaz or kniaz became a hereditary noble title in the Grand Duchy of Moscow and the Grand Duchy of Lithuania. Following the union of the Kingdom of Poland and the Grand Duchy of Lithuania, kniaź became a recognised title in the Polish-Lithuanian Commonwealth. By the 1630s – apart from the title pan, which indicated membership of the large szlachta noble class – kniaź was the only hereditary title that was officially recognised and officially used in the Polish-Lithuanian Commonwealth. Notable holders of the title kniaź include Jeremi Wiśniowiecki.

== South Slavic countries ==
In the 19th century, the Serbian term knez (кнез) and the Bulgarian term knyaz (княз) were revived to denote semi-independent rulers of those countries, such as Alexander Karađorđević and Alexander of Battenberg. In parts of Serbia and western Bulgaria, knez was the informal title of the elder or mayor of a village or zadruga until around the 19th century. Those are officially called gradonačelnik (градоначелник) (Serbia) and gradonachalnik (градоначалник) or kmet (кмет) (Bulgaria).

=== Bulgaria ===
- Prior to Battenberg, the title knyaz was born by Simeon I during the First Bulgarian Empire (9th–10th century). At the height of his power, Simeon adopted the title of tsar ("emperor"), as did the Bulgarian rulers after the country became officially independent in 1908.
- As of Bulgaria's independence in 1908, Knyaz Ferdinand became Tsar Ferdinand, and the words knyaz and knyaginya began to be used instead for the tsar's children – the heir to the throne, for example, held the title Knyaz Tarnovski (Prince of Tarnovo").

=== Bosnia ===
In early medieval Bosnia knez (knjaz, књаз) was a title used, along župan and duke (vojvoda) titles, for Bosnian rulers. One of the first such ruler, recorded in historic documents and later historiography, was Stephen, Duke of Bosnia.

Later it was held by several of most powerful magnates (in Bosnia vlastelin) of the era, sometime along with an office title given to a person through service to the monarch, such as Grand Duke of Bosnia (Veliki vojvoda bosanski), which was office of the supreme military commander of the realm. Other noble titles included the knez, the duke (vojvoda) and the župan. The title knez is equivalent to that of prince. Among most influential of Bosnian nobleman with the title knez was Pavle Radinović of Radinović-Pavlović noble family, while other include several noblemen from Radojević-Mirković family, such as Batić Mirković. Further families that bear this title are for example Šantić noble family and most members of Hrvatinić.

=== Croatia ===
- knez was the monarchial title used by the medieval rulers of the Duchy of Lower Pannonia and the Duchy of Croatia from the 7th to the 10th century, who were mostly titled as dux and rarely as princeps in Latin sources and translated as Dukes in English ones.
- knez was, in the Late Middle Ages, a hereditary feudal title borne by Croatian vassal noble families who were great territorial magnates of high social class (such as knezovi Bribirski (Counts of Bribir), knezovi Krčki (Counts of Krk) and knezovi Zrinski (Counts of Zrin)) and went by the title of comes in Latin and Count in English.

=== North Macedonia ===
The title used in Macedonian historiography for Medieval local leaders.

=== Montenegro ===
- knjaz (књаз) was the ruler title used by the Petrović-Njegoš dynasty in Principality of Montenegro from 1852 until the establishment of Kingdom of Montenegro in 1905, translated as "Prince".

=== Serbia ===
- knez (кнез) or knjaz (књаз) is a common term used in Serbian historiography for Serbian rulers in the Early Middle Ages, who were titled archon in Greek.
- knez (кнез) or knjaz (књаз) was a noble title used by medieval rulers of the Principality of Serbia, Duklja, and Moravian Serbia.
- knez (кнез) was a title borne by local Serbian chiefs under the Ottoman Empire. It was another name for the Ottoman Turkish rank of kodjabashi, held by local Christian chiefs.
- obor-knez (обор-кнез) was a title borne by elected local native Serbian chiefs of the nahiyah (district of a group of villages) in the Ottoman Sanjak of Smederevo (also known as the Belgrade Pashaluk) and in the Negotin Krajina, an autonomous timar of valide sultan. The obor-knez was senior chief and responsible for his district's people and was their spokesman (intermediary) in direct relations with the Pasha, though usually through the sipahi, and was in charge of the transfer of taxes levied on the villages.
- knez (кнез) or knjaz (књаз) was the monarchial title used by Miloš Obrenović in Principality of Serbia, translated as "Prince". Serbia known as Kneževina Srbija (Кнежевина Србија) was de facto independent since 1817, becoming de jure independent with the 1869 constitution. The successors of Miloš used the title until 1882 when Serbia was elevated into a kingdom.

== See also ==
- Voivode
- Boyar
- Hospodar
- Knyazev
- Knez (Vlach leader)
- Konung

== Sources ==
- Mihaljčić, R. (1999) Knez. in: Ćirković S.i R.Mihaljčić [ed.] Leksikon srpskog srednjeg veka, Beograd, str. 299–301
