= Glossary of Russian nobility and royalty =

Categories of Russian nobility and Russian royalty

- Knyaz (as ancient ruler), knyaginya, knyazhna (daughter)
  - Velikiy Knyaz (Grand Duke, Grand Prince, as a ruler)
- Boyar
- Tsar (Emperor), Tsaritsa (Tsarina) (Empress, Empress consort)
  - Tsar family
    - Tsesarevich
    - Tsarevich, Tsarevna
    - Velikiy Knyaz (Grand Prince, Grand Duke) (as an aristocratic title), Velikaya Knyaginya (Grand Princess), Velikaya Knyazhna (Grand Princess)
- Dvoryanstvo
  - Titled Dvoryanstvo (titulovannoye dvoryanstvo)
    - Count
    - Baron
    - Knyaz (as title)

== Hierarchy before Peter the Great ==
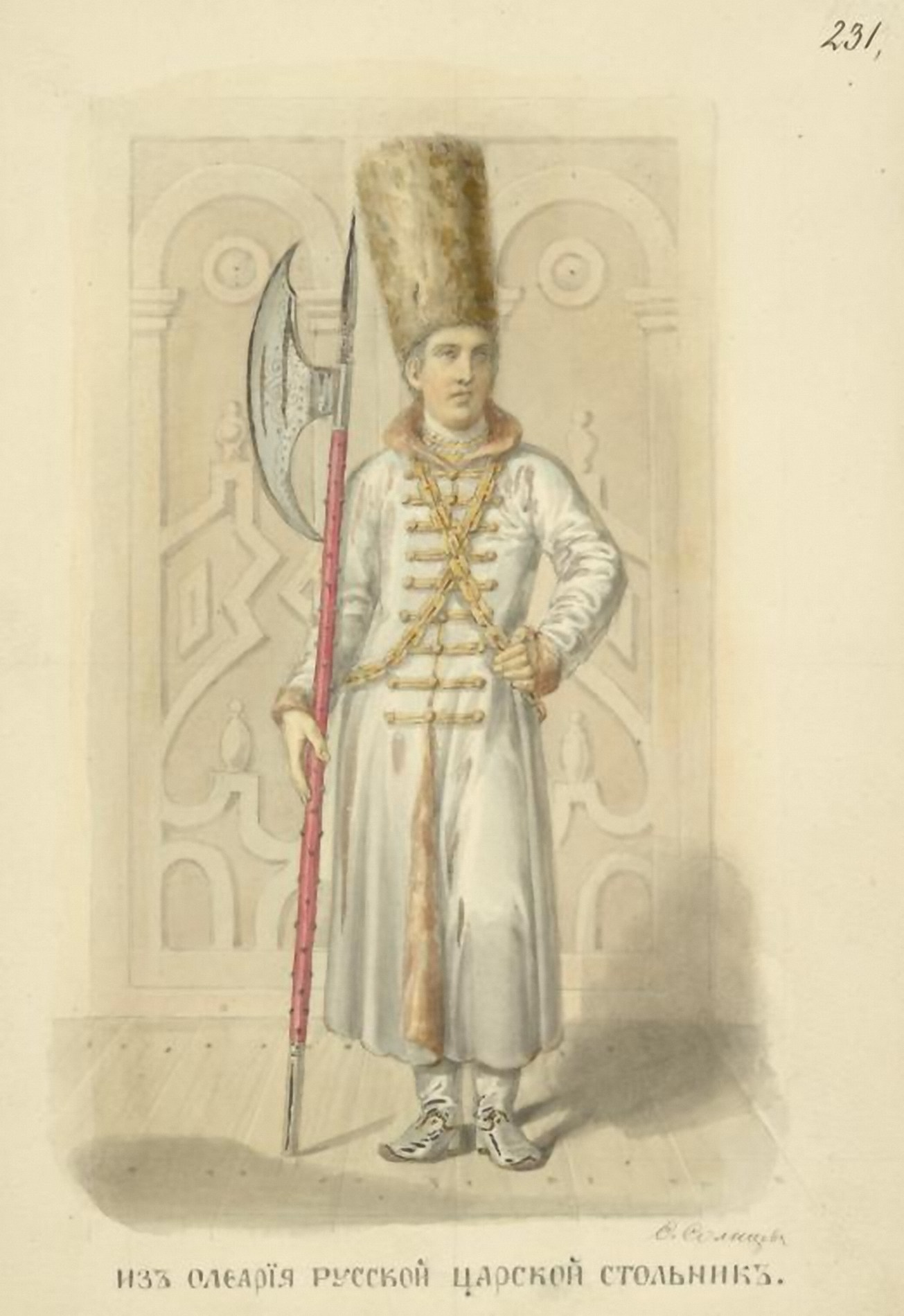
Tsar's stolnik

According to Gerhard Friedrich Müller's Известия о дворянах российских:

1. ru:Бояре
2. ru:Окольничие
3. ru:Думные дворяне
4. ru:Стольники
5. ru:Стряпчие
6. ru:Дворяне
7. Жильцы
8. ru:Дети боярские

== See also ==
- Table of Ranks
