= Senff =

Senff is a German surname.

People with the surname include:

- Bartholf Senff (1815–1900), German music publisher
- Birgit Senff, retired German gymnast
- Carl Adolf Senff (1785-1863), German painter
- Karl August Senff (1770–1838), Baltic German painter
- Nida Senff (1920–1995), Dutch swimmer
- Theresa Senff (b. 1982), German road cyclist
