= Belozersky =

Belozersky (masculine), Belozerskaya (feminine), or Belozerskoye (neuter) is a Russian-language adjectival noun derived from the names Beloye Ozero or "Beloozero", literally "White Lake", but commonly rendered as Lake Beloye.

The term may refer to:

- Belozersky (surname), derived from the Principality of Beloozero in what is now European Russia
- Belozersky Canal, of the Volga–Baltic Waterway
- Belozersky District, name of several districts in Russia
- St. Cyril of White Lake, sometimes transliterated as Cyril Belozersky
- St. Therapont of White Lake, sometimes transliterated as Ferapont Belozersky
- Belozerskoye, a rural locality (a selo) in Kurgan Oblast, Russia
