= Principality =

Monarchical state under the rule of a prince or princess

A principality (or sometimes princedom) is a type of monarchical state or feudal territory ruled by a prince. Examples of principalities include the Principality of Monaco, the Grand Principality of Moscow, the Principality of Sheikhan, the Principality of Catalonia, and the Principality of Wales. The Principality of Antioch is another example of a principality, yet one created during the First Crusade which included parts of Anatolia (modern-day Turkey) and Syria. The principality was much smaller than the County of Edessa or the Kingdom of Jerusalem.

== Etymology ==
The word principality first appears around 1300, meaning "position of a prince," and derives from Old French principalite, which itself carried the senses of "principal matter" as well as "power" and "sovereignty", and directly from the Late Latin principalitatem, which in turn comes from the adjective principalis, meaning "first in importance" or "original, primitive." By the mid-14th century, the term had acquired the additional sense of "government by a prince," and toward the end of that same century it came to denote a "region or state ruled by a prince or monarch."

In the 20th century the term was sometimes used to define a state that was sovereign but not of equal rank to the other countries of the world. Independent but not eligible for membership in the United Nations.

== Current principalities ==
=== Sovereign states ===
- Principality of Andorra
- Principality of Liechtenstein
- Principality of Monaco

=== Non-sovereign principalities ===
- Sheikhan principality

== See also ==
- Grand prince
- Grand principality
- Victory title
- Emirate
