= Belozersky District =

Location of Kurgan Oblast in Russia

Location of Vologda Oblast in Russia

Belozersky District is the name of several administrative and municipal districts in Russia. The name literally means "pertaining to white lakes".

== Modern districts ==
- Belozersky District, Kurgan Oblast, an administrative and municipal district of Kurgan Oblast
- Belozersky District, Vologda Oblast, an administrative and municipal district of Vologda Oblast

== Historical districts ==
- Belozersky District, Orenburg Oblast, a former district in Orenburg Oblast; merged into Oktyabrsky District in 1965

== See also ==
- Belozersky (disambiguation)
- Belozersk
