= Grand duchy =

State with a grand duke or duchess as head of state

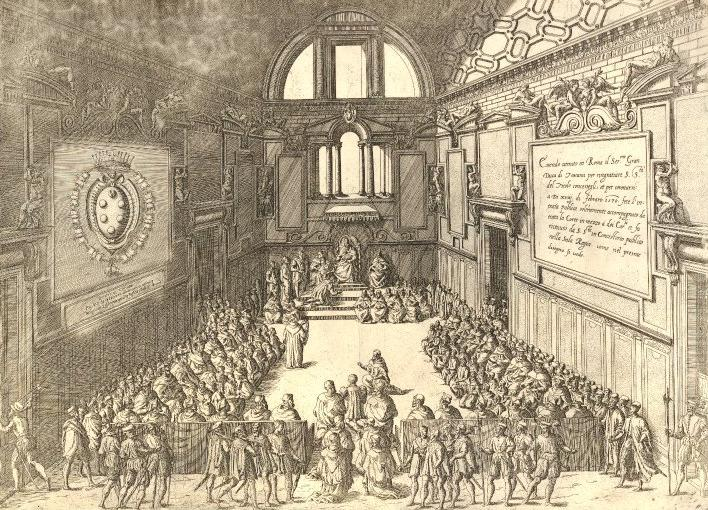
Coronation of Cosimo I de' Medici as Grand Duke of Tuscany in 1570.

A grand duchy or grand dukedom is a country or territory whose official head of state or ruler is a monarch bearing the title of grand duke or grand duchess.

Prior to the early 1800s, the only Grand duchy in Europe was located in what is now Italy: Tuscany (declared in 1569). During the 19th century there were as many as 14 grand duchies in Europe at once, some of which were revived after the Napoleonic Empire. Some of these were sovereign and nominally independent (Baden, Hesse and by Rhine, Mecklenburg-Schwerin, Mecklenburg-Strelitz, Oldenburg, Saxe-Weimar-Eisenach and Tuscany), some sovereign but held in personal union with larger realms by a monarch whose grand-dukedom was borne as a subsidiary title (Finland, Luxembourg, Transylvania, Kraków, Posen), some of which were client states of a more powerful realm (Cleves and Berg), and some whose territorial boundaries were nominal and the position purely titular (Frankfurt).

In the 21st century, only Luxembourg remains a grand duchy.

== Luxembourg ==
Coat of Arms of the Grand Duchy of Luxembourg

The only grand duchy still extant is Luxembourg. It regained its independence from Napoleonic France and became a sovereign grand duchy in 1815 by decision of the Congress of Vienna which dealt with the political aftermath of the Napoleonic Wars.

In order to act as a sufficient counterbalance to France, the Congress decided to grant the dignity of grand duke of Luxembourg to the monarch of the newly created United Kingdom of the Netherlands which comprised present-day Netherlands and Belgium. Luxembourg remained in personal union with the crown of the Netherlands until 1890 when William III, King of the Netherlands and Grand Duke of Luxembourg, died without leaving a male heir. He was succeeded on the Dutch throne by his daughter Wilhelmina, but she could not become Grand Duchess of Luxembourg under the semi-Salic law established by the Congress of Vienna. In terms of the law, the grand ducal throne had to be passed to a male dynast. If there were no male heirs in a specific branch of the House of Nassau, the throne would go to the next in line from any of the other branches. This resulted in the title of grand duke being bestowed on a distant male cousin of William III, Adolphe, from the elder branch of Nassau-Weilburg (at present Luxembourg-Nassau). The current monarch is Guillaume V since 3 October 2025.

== History ==
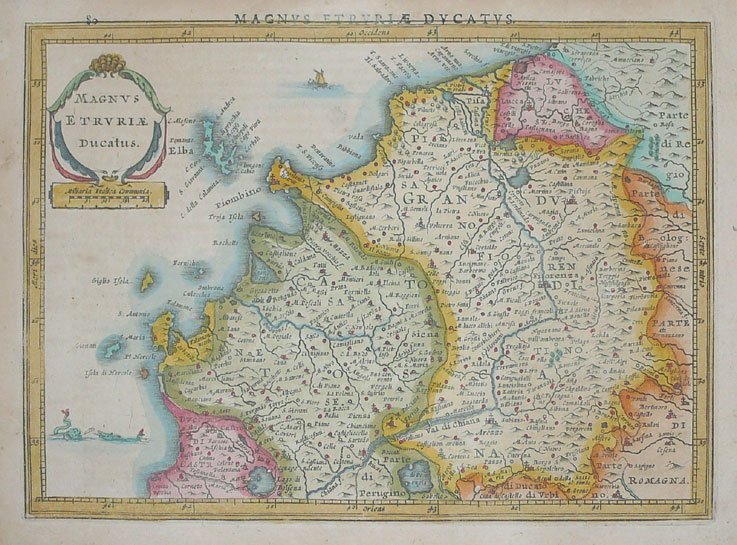
The Grand Duchy of Tuscany (1569–1860, part of Italy afterwards)

The term "grand duchy" is of relatively late invention, used at first in Western Europe in 1569 in the case of Tuscany, to denote either territories of a particularly mighty duke or territories of significant importance in political, economical or military matters without being of sufficient size or importance to be recognized internationally as a kingdom.

The number of duchies had inflated towards the end of the Middle Ages to an extent that included middle-sized towns or relatively small fiefs, as compared to the national, pre-medieval tribal provinces. As a consequence, a new title was needed to make the difference between important and unimportant regional powers: the title grand duke was born.

One of the first examples was the unofficial use of the title for the dukes of Burgundy, who almost succeeded in forming a new kingdom in the historical region of Lotharingia. Collectively known as the Burgundian State in modern historiography, they held lands in modern-day eastern France (Burgundy, Franche-Comté, Alsatia, Lorraine, Champagne, Picardy and Nord-Pas-de-Calais) as well as most of modern Belgium, the Netherlands and Luxembourg and small parts of western Germany (Burgundian Netherlands).

The first monarchy ever officially titled a "grand duchy" was the Medici sovereignty over Tuscany thanks to a papal bull issued by Pope Pius V, the first rulers receiving the title in 1569. Tuscany remained a grand duchy until 1860, when it was annexed by the Kingdom of Sardinia which succeeded in establishing a united Kingdom of Italy.

In the early nineteenth century, Napoléon I occasionally used the title "grand duchy" for several French satellite states given to his relatives or generals. Other allies abandoned the orbit of the Holy Roman Empire to join Napoleon's nominally independent Confederation of the Rhine. The elevation of these vassals to the title of grand duke was usually accompanied by an expansion of their realms with additional territory gathered at the expense of subdued powers such as Prussia. Though Napoleon was defeated at the Battle of Waterloo and most of his newly created satellite states abolished, the Congress of Vienna restored some of the previous sovereign duchies and principalities, while recognizing others as grand duchies. As a result, the 19th century saw the creation of a new group of grand duchies in central Europe, such as the grand duchies of Hesse, Baden and Oldenburg.

Historically, in Europe a sovereign grand duke was one of the highest ranks among hereditary rulers after emperor and king, and was equal to that of prince-elector; ranking as royalty, i.e., European rulers and, in Germany, the reigning nobility (Hochadel). The correct form of address (also for the heir apparent and his wife) is Royal Highness (HRH).

The title of grand duke borne under the Russian Empire by children and grandchildren of its rulers was a non-sovereign honorific, unrelated to any grand duchy, to which was attached the style of Imperial Highness (HIH). Ranking, internationally, no higher than the members of other reigning dynasties whose head held the title of emperor, the usage was an historical anomaly, persisting from the elevation of the Grand Duchy of Muscovy to the tsardom and, later, empire of All Russia, until its collapse in 1917.

== Associated titles ==
In several Slavic languages (such as Ukrainian, Belarusian and Russian), the term often translated into English as "grand duke" is literally grand prince. In some western European languages (English, French, Spanish, Italian, Portuguese, etc.), the term "grand prince" was rare or non-existent, used to refer to some rulers of Transylvania, Russia or Tuscany prior to the 19th century. In German and Scandinavian languages, both titles co-exist: Großherzog ("grand duke") and Großfürst ("grand prince"). Fürst is specifically a monarchal title (as used, for example, by the imperial princes (Reichsfürsten) of the Holy Roman Empire and retained by several of the smaller post-1815 German states' rulers, and still in use today by the Prince of Liechtenstein) and is distinct from Prinz, which is used for a member of the dynasty of a monarch; both are translated as "prince" in English.

Emerging from the Middle Ages, the rulers of Ruthenia (modern Ukraine), Lithuania and some Eastern Slavic states, as well as other Eastern European princes and later Russian dynasts, were referred to by the title Великий Князь (Veliky Knyaz, German: Großfürst), whose literal English translation is "grand prince" rather than "grand duke". Although grand prince is found in historical references, since the reign of Catherine the Great, the Russian Veliky Knyaz has usually been translated into English as "grand duke". Since the 18th century it has also been used to refer to cadets of the imperial House of Romanov who were children or patrilineal grandchildren of a Russian emperor. More remote descendants of emperors were titled "prince" (князь, knyaz).

The Grand Duchy of Finland, an autonomous state ruled by the Russian Empire and established in 1809, was referred to in Swedish, Finnish and Russian as a Grand Principality (Swedish: Storfurstendömet Finland; Finnish: Suomen suuriruhtinaskunta; Russian: Великое княжество Финляндское) Velikoye knyazhestvo Finlyandskoye; The Russian Tsar held title as Grand Duke of Finland.

The title of "Grand Prince" (Ukrainian: Великий Князь) was used by the supreme Kievan rulers of Kievan Rus'. After the disintegration of Kievan Rus’, different members of the Rurik Dynasty in the northern principalities could compete for the title of Grand Prince of Kiev. Some princes however could add "Grand" to their title without winning the competition, thereby establishing their principality's independence from Kievan metropole.

The title Magnus Dux or "grand duke" (Lithuanian: Didysis kunigaikštis) was used by the rulers of Lithuania, and after rulers from the Jagiellonian dynasty became Kings of Poland, it was found among the titles used by the rulers of the Polish–Lithuanian Commonwealth. The Polish kings of the Swedish House of Vasa also used this grand-princely title for their non-Polish territories.

On the other hand, the Habsburg (Austrian) Großfürstentum Siebenbürgen is referred to as the Grand Principality of Transylvania in English rather than as a Grand Duchy, since its name/title derives directly from Großfürst(entum). Until the 18th century it had been simply referred to as Fürstentum Siebenbürgen in German and the Principality of Transylvania in English, much like the Danubian Principalities.

Junior members of the dynasties of historical grand duchies in Germany sometimes bore the style of Highness, sometimes that of Grand Ducal Highness, and continued to be accorded those styles post-monarchy by courtesy in such reference works as the Almanach de Gotha and Burke's Peerage.

== List ==
Prior to the Napoleonic Wars, only one grand duchy was recognized in Europe:

- Grand Duchy of Tuscany (1569–1860; created via papal bull from the Duchy of Florence, absorbed into the Kingdom of Italy in 1860)

Other states whose names are translated as "grand duchy" in English were, properly, grand principalities:

- Grand Duchy of Lithuania (Lithuanian: Lietuvos Didžioji Kunigaikštystė, Ruthenian: Великое князство Литовське; established c. 1183/1236, in personal union with the Kingdom of Poland in 1386–1401, 1447–1492, and 1501–1795)
- Grand Duchy of Kiev or Kievan Rus' (Ruthenian: Вели́ке Кня́зівство Київське; 882–1240)
- Grand Duchy of Rus' (Ukrainian: Велике Князівство Руське; intended to be a part of Polish-Lithuanian-Ruthenian Commonwealth)
- Grand Duchy of Finland (Finnish: Suomen suuriruhtinaskunta, Swedish: Storfurstendömet Finland, Russian: Великое Княжество Финляндское; raised from duchy status, from c. 1580 to 1809 as part of the Swedish Empire; conquered by the Russian Empire and held 1809–1917 in personal union with the Russian Empire; later became a fully independent Republic of Finland in 1917)
- Grand Principality of Smolensk (Belarusian: Вялікае Княства Смаленскае; Principality of Kievan Rus', raised from duchy status)
- Grand Principality of Transylvania (1765–1867) a realm of the Hungarian Crown and after 1804 an Austrian crown land.
- Grand Duchy of Moscow (Russian: Великое Княжество Московское)
- Grand Duchy of Ryazan (Russian: Великое Княжество Рязанское)

The Napoleonic Wars saw several minor ducal titles so elevated, and between then and World War I there were many grand duchies in Europe. Some were created in the Napoleonic era, others were recognized by the Congress of Vienna and were founding members of the German Confederation.

- Grand Duchy of Berg (1806–1813, absorbed into Prussia afterwards)
- Grand Duchy of Würzburg (1806–1814, absorbed into Bavaria afterwards)
- Grand Duchy of Baden (1806–1918, joined the German Empire in 1871)
- Grand Duchy of Hesse (1806–1918, joined the German Empire in 1871)
- Grand Duchy of Fulda (1816–1866) part of the Electorate of Hesse, annexed by Prussia 1866)
- Grand Duchy of Frankfurt (1810–1813, part of several German states afterwards)
- Grand Duchy of the Lower Rhine (1815–1822 as part of Prussia)
- Grand Duchy of Luxembourg (from 1815 in personal union with the Netherlands until 1890. Extant independently)
- Grand Duchy of Mecklenburg-Schwerin (1815–1918, joined the German Empire in 1871)
- Grand Duchy of Mecklenburg-Strelitz (1815–1918, joined the German Empire in 1871)
- Grand Duchy of Posen (1815–1848 as a de facto part of Prussia (nominally ruled in a personal union), Großherzogtum Posen)
- Grand Duchy of Saxe-Weimar-Eisenach (1815–1918, joined the German Empire in 1871)
- Grand Duchy of Oldenburg (1829–1918, joined the German Empire in 1871)
- Grand Duchy of Cracow (1846–1918 nominally a separate Austrian crown land, administered as part of Galicia and Lodomeria, Großherzogtum Krakau)

The term "grand duchy" is often, but incorrectly, used in reference to Warsaw between 1807 and 1813, which was in fact the Duchy of Warsaw.

== Metonymy ==
In Belgium and to some extent in France, Grand-Duché (French for "grand duchy") is often used as a metonym to refer to the neighbouring country, the Grand Duchy of Luxembourg. This practice helps to avoid confusion with the adjacent Belgian Province of Luxembourg, i.e. the Walloon-speaking part of the portion of Luxembourg which was annexed by Belgium in 1839. This is comparable to how "the Republic" is used in the UK and Ireland as a shorthand to refer to the Republic of Ireland instead of the island of Ireland or Northern Ireland.

== See also ==
- Archduke
- Duchy
- Grand principality
- Herzog
- The Grand Duke, a Savoy opera
