= Johann Wilhelm Schütze =

German painter and art professor

Johann Wilhelm Schütze (September 1807, Hamburg – 24 July 1878, Berlin) was a German painter and art professor. His birth year is sometimes given as 1814, and the place as Berlin. He has often been confused with Wilhelm Schütze, a painter from Munich.

== Life and work ==
His first art lessons were in Berlin, with August von Kloeber. From 1847 to 1848, he worked with Carl Eggers, creating frescoes designed by Karl Friedrich Schinkel, in the hallway at the Altes Museum. Later, he was a professor at the Royal School of Art.

He was especially successful as a painter of genre scenes, from the lives of the rural farmers; with a preference for naïve, youthful characters. Many of his works were made into lithographs (and other prints) by himself and others, and issued in folio formats. These became widely popular. One of these prints, a wood-engraving by Richard Brend'amour (1831–1915), was published in the British newspaper Illustrated London News in 1882.

His works include a large altarpiece at the Gutskirche Melkof (1869). Schützenstraße in Hamburg is named after him.

== Sources ==
- Georg Kaspar Nagler: Neues allgemeines Künstler-Lexicon oder Nachrichten aus dem Leben und den Werken der Maler, Bildhauer, Baumeister, Kupferstecher, Formschneider, Lithographen, Zeichner, Medailleure, Elfenbeinarbeiter, etc., Vol.15. Fleischmann, Munich 1845, pg.50.
- Friedrich von Boetticher: Malerwerke des neunzehnten Jahrhunderts: Beitrag zur Kunstgeschichte. Vol.2, Boetticher, Dresden 1898, pg.686.
- "Schütze, Wilhelm (1814)". In: Hans Vollmer (Ed.): Allgemeines Lexikon der Bildenden Künstler von der Antike bis zur Gegenwart, Vol.30: Scheffel–Siemerding. E. A. Seemann, Leipzig 1936, pg.319
