= List of states by the date of adoption of the Reformation =

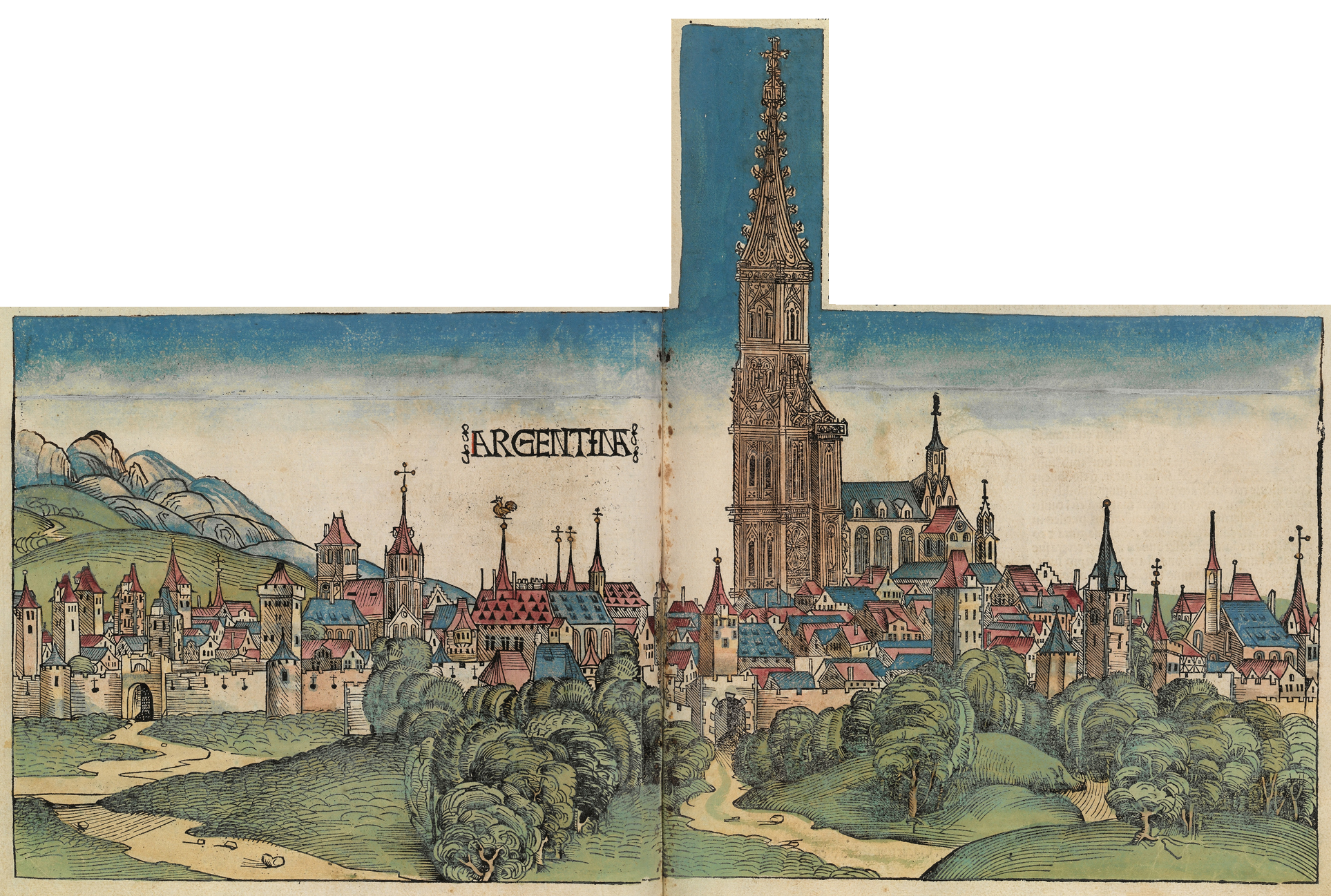
A view of Straßburg from the Nuremberg Chronicle (1493). The city council took control of the churches in 1524, a fact which attracted many Protestant reformers to carry out their work there.

This is the list of states by the date of adoption of the Reformation, meaning the date of an official conversion of a ruler or that of making a Protestant confession an official state religion. The list is incomplete due to the persisting feudalistic nature of many states in the early modern Europe.

The Reformation began in 1517 but did not receive formal state support until 1525, although some imperial cities, like Strassburg, introduced it in 1524. The city council of Strassburg eventually came to support the Reformed tradition with reformers like Martin Bucer, Matthew Zell, Wolfgang Capito and Caspar Hedio.

Duchy of Prussia and some other states in the Holy Roman Empire introduced Lutheranism as early as 1525. Depending on the view, Luther's country (the Electoral Saxony) adopted the confession either in 1525 (elector becomes Lutheran) or 1527 (Lutheranism is made a state religion).

== Pre-Reformation ==
As a result of the Bohemian Reformation, Western Christianity was already compromised in the Lands of the Bohemian Crown for decades before Luther. An Utraquist Hussite confession was dominant since the early 1420s and also formally permitted, alongside the Catholic Church, since the Basel Compacts (1436/7) and definitively since the Religious peace of Kutná Hora (1485). George of Poděbrady was the first non-Roman Catholic ruler in the Catholic part of the early modern Europe. He ruled over Bohemia during 1458–1471.

- Lands of the Bohemian Crown (1436/7, 1485)
  - Kingdom of Bohemia
  - Margraviate of Moravia
  - occasionally Silesia and Lusatia

== By year ==
=== 1524 ===
- Strassburg
- Nuremberg

=== 1525 ===
- Anhalt-Köthen
- Duchy of Prussia
- Principality of Ansbach
- Duchy of Brunswick-Lüneburg
- County of Mansfeld-Mittelort
- County of Mansfeld-Hinterort

=== 1526 ===
- Landgraviate of Hesse
- Anhalt-Bernburg

=== 1527 ===
- Electoral Saxony
- Principality of Lüneburg
- Sweden

=== 1528 ===
- Bern

=== 1529 ===
- Basel
- Hamburg

=== 1530 ===
- Ulm
- Frankfurt am Main

=== 1531 ===
- Lübeck

=== 1534 ===
- England
- Duchy of Württemberg
- Duchy of Pomerania

=== 1536 ===
- Denmark-Norway
- Geneva
- Lausanne

=== 1539 ===
- Margraviate of Brandenburg

=== 1542 ===
- Duchy of Schleswig
- Duchy of Holstein

=== 1549 ===
- Mecklenburg

=== 1556 ===
- Baden-Durlach

=== 1557 ===
- Electoral Palatinate

=== 1559 ===
- County of Schaumburg

=== 1560 ===
- Scotland

=== 1575 ===
- Aalen

=== 1579 ===
- Dutch Republic

=== 1581 ===
- Aachen

=== 1610 ===
- County of Mansfeld-Vorderort
