= Immanuel Christian Leberecht von Ampach =

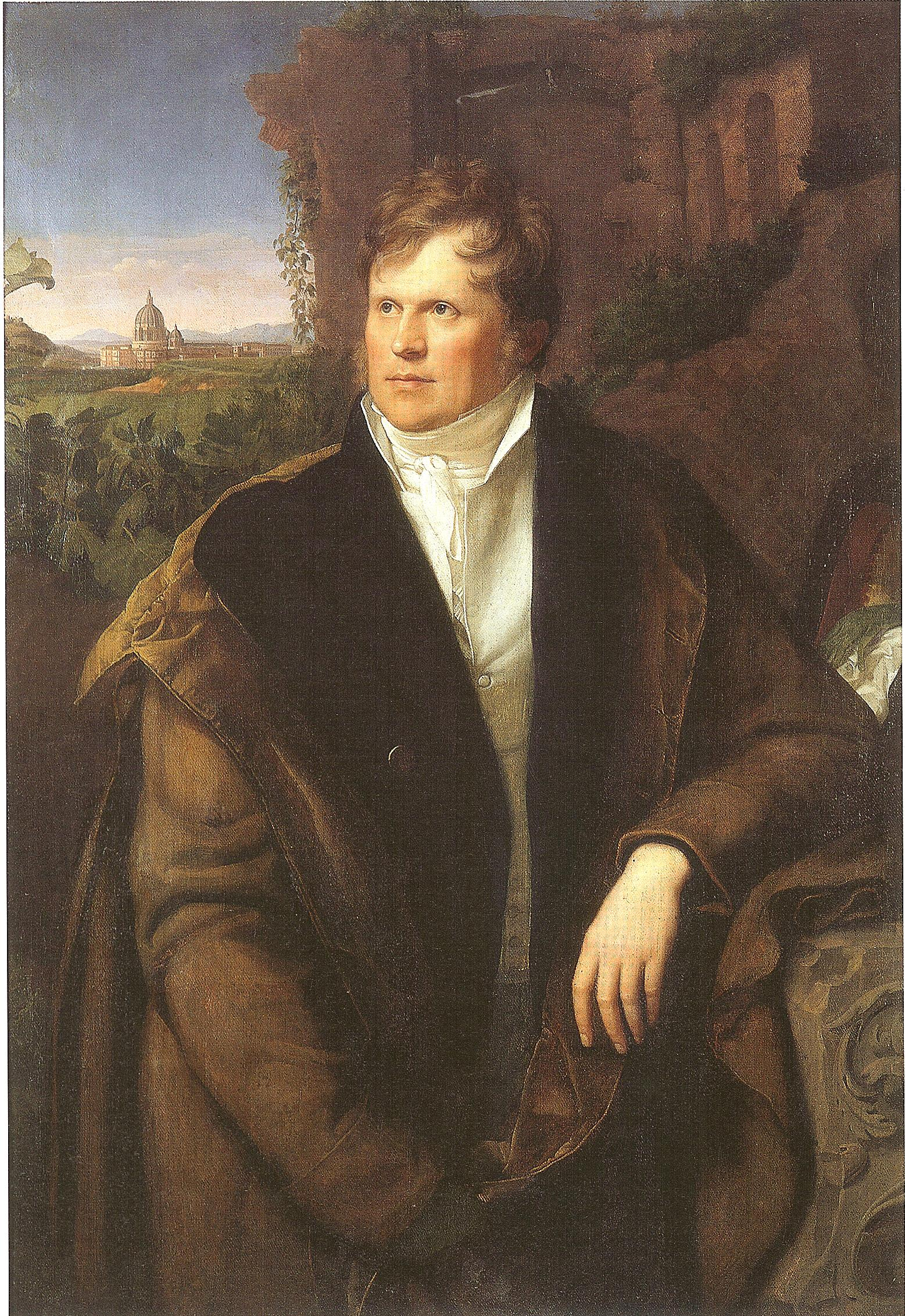
Immanuel Christian Leberecht von Ampach (1820); portrait by Carl Christian Vogel von Vogelstein

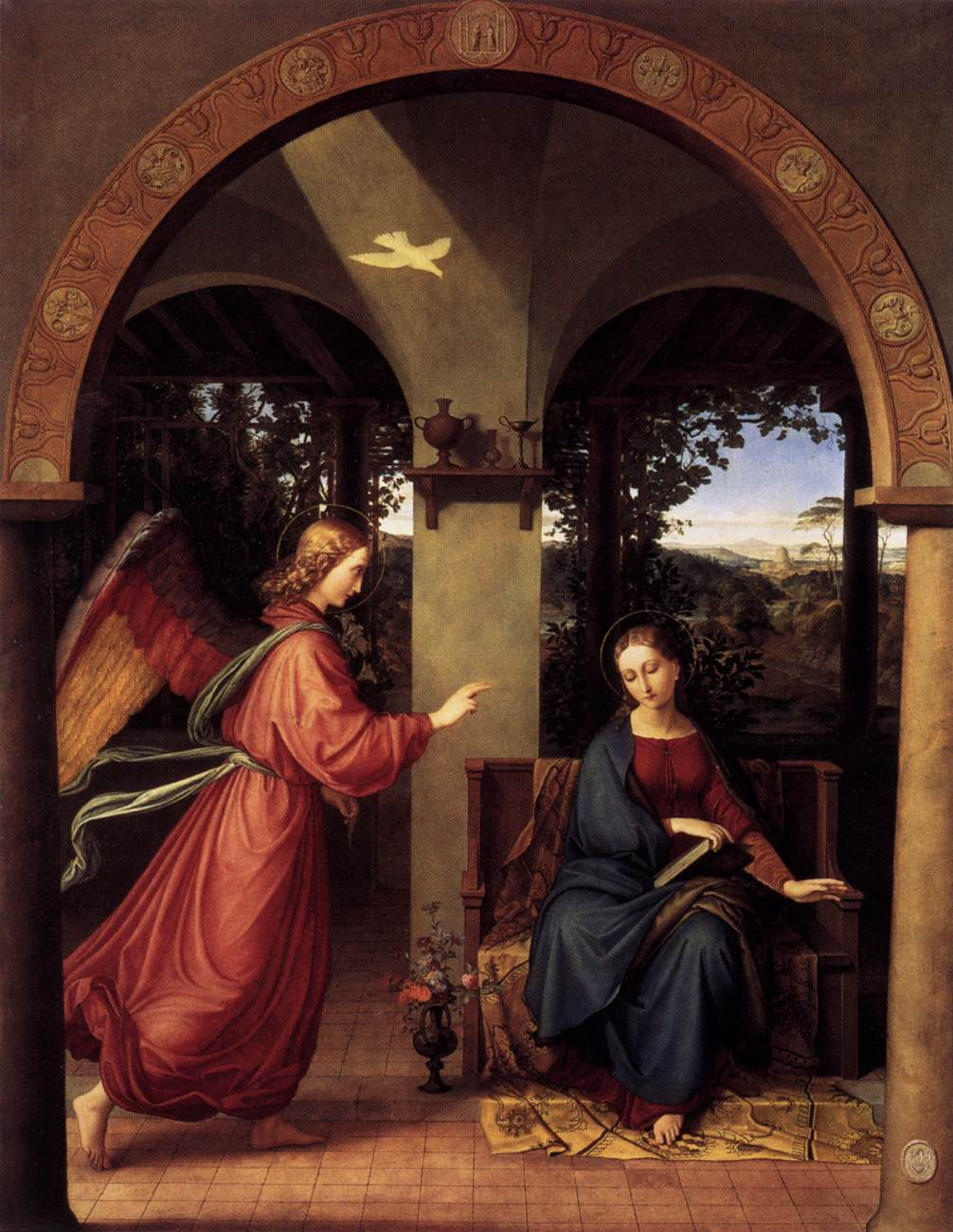
The Annunciation, by Julius Schnorr von Carolsfeld

Immanuel Christian Leberecht von Ampach (11 December 1772, in Artern – 5 June 1831, in Naumburg) was a German collegiate church councillor, canon in Naumburg, and Dean of the collegiate chapter in Wurzen. He is best remembered as a coin collector and patron of the arts.

== Life and work ==
His father, Johann Friedrich von Ampach (1742-1824), was a cavalry officer and salt distribution manager. He initially studied law and, in 1801, was an agent of the Kingdom of Saxony in Paris. From 1803, he was a councilor in the government of Hochstift Meißen in Wurzen, which was independent until 1818 and, as such, was Dean of the Kollegiatstift Wurzen. Together with the cathedral Provost, Christian Ludwig Stieglitz, he managed the renovation of the Dom St. Marien zu Wurzen, in Neo-Gothic style.

As an art patron and collector, he travelled to Rome in the early 1820s, in order to present commissions to the painters of the Nazarene movement. He began with some individual works from Julius Schnorr von Carolsfeld, Friedrich von Olivier and Theodor Rehbenitz, who lived together in the Palazzo Vidoni Caffarelli.

For his private chapel at his home in Naumburg, he then ordered nine paintings, to form a "Christus-Zyklus" (Christ Cycle), to be created by nine different artists under the direction of Schnorr. This would be the third community cycle created by the Nazarenes; following the ones at Palazzo Zuccari and the Casino Massimo. Ampach chose the artists himself, and publicized the process in the German press. The ninth painter proved to be a difficult decision, but was made in consultation with Schnorr. In addition to Rehbenitz, Olivier, and Schnorr (already mentioned), Ampach chose Friedrich Wilhelm Schadow, Carl Adolf Senff, Philipp Veit, Carl Eggers, Carl Christian Vogel von Vogelstein and Gustav Heinrich Naecke.

In the winter of 1824/25, he returned to Rome to see if the paintings had been completed. Some had, although it would be 1827 before the project was finished. In the meantime, many of the artists returned to Germany, to take positions they had been offered there. A separate commission, to Friedrich Overbeck, was withdrawn. He gave a great deal of thought to arranging the panels and, despite being part of a private chapel, issued an anonymous brochure, explaining how to properly view the paintings, indicating that his intent had always been of a public, educational nature.

After his death, the paintings passed into possession of the Naumburg Cathedral, and were displayed in various places over the years. One was lost in the fire at the Munich Glaspalast in 1931. Since 2006, they have been on display in the cathedral's Epiphany Chapel. His famous coin collection, the "Numophilatrium Ampachianum", was sold through a series of auctions. The catalogs are still used for research.

In addition to paintings, he bequeathed impressive legacies. Among them: 1,000 Thalers for the girls' school at the Domfreiheit in Naumburg, 1,000 Thalers for the street lighting near the cathedral, 1,000 Thalers to the Ampach Foundation fund for loyal servants, 500 Thalers to the Citizens' Rescue Institute, 400 Thalers for the women's association, and 300 Thalers for the city's poor.
