= Belozersky District, Kurgan Oblast =

Belozersky District Белозерский район
- District
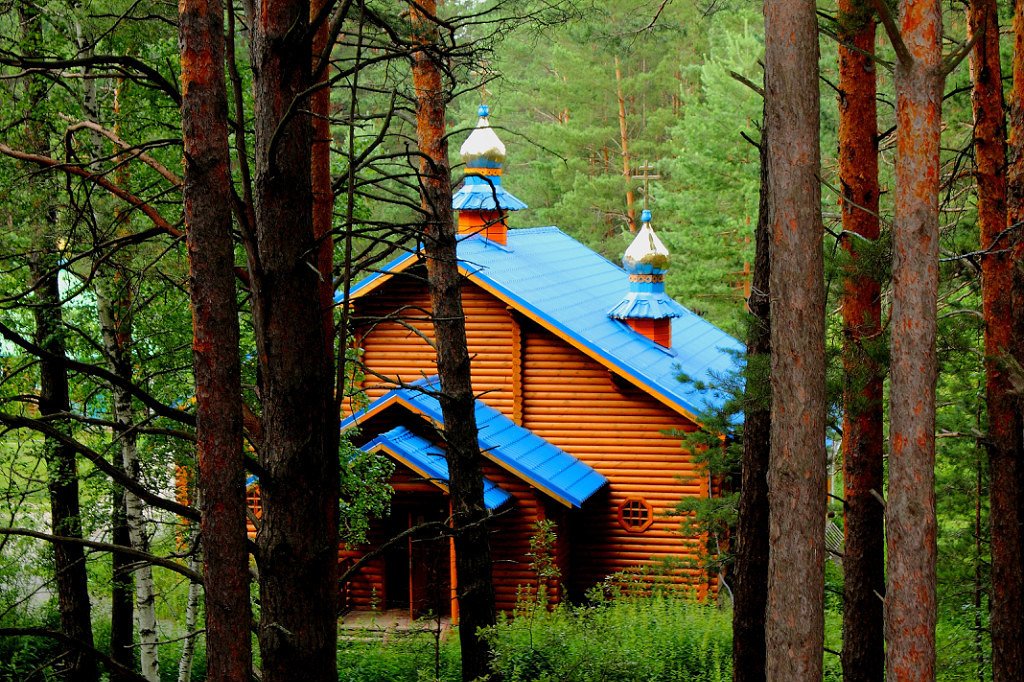

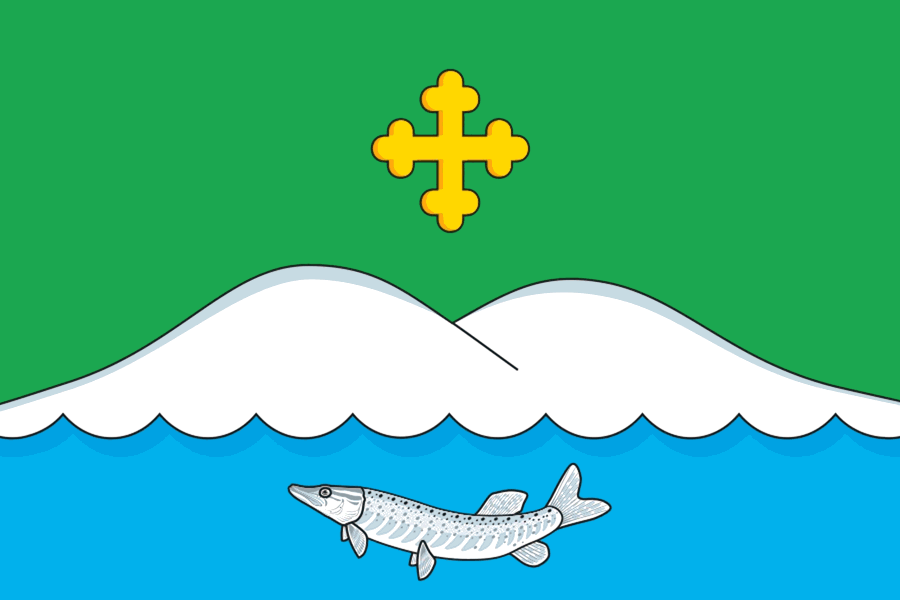
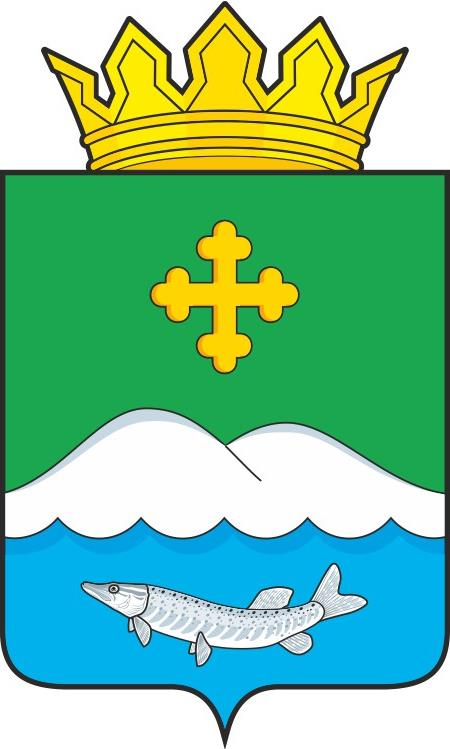
- Flag Coat of arms
- Location of Belozersky District in Kurgan Oblast
- Coordinates: 56°01′N 65°42′E
- Country: Russia
- Federal subject: Kurgan Oblast
- Established: 12 January 1965
- Administrative center: Belozerskoye

Area
  - Total: 3,420 km^{2} (1,320 sq mi)

Population (2010 Census)
  - Total: 16,934
  - Density: 4.95/km^{2} (12.8/sq mi)
  - Urban: 0%
  - Rural: 100%

Administrative structure
  - Administrative divisions: 19 selsoviet
  - Inhabited localities: 71 rural localities

Municipal structure
  - Municipally incorporated as: Belozersky Municipal District
  - Municipal divisions: 0 urban settlements, 19 rural settlements
- Time zone: UTC+5 (MSK+2)
- OKTMO ID: 37604000
- Website: http://www.belozerka.ru/

Belozersky District (Russian: Белозерский райо́н) is an administrative and municipal district (raion), one of the twenty-four in Kurgan Oblast, Russia. It is located in the north of the oblast. The area of the district is 3,420 square kilometers (1,320 sq mi). Its administrative center is the rural locality (a selo) of Belozerskoye. Population: 16,934 (2010 Census); 21,128 (2002 Census); 24,208 (1989 Soviet census). The population of Belozerskoye accounts for 24.5% of the district's total population.
