= Carl Eggers =

German painter

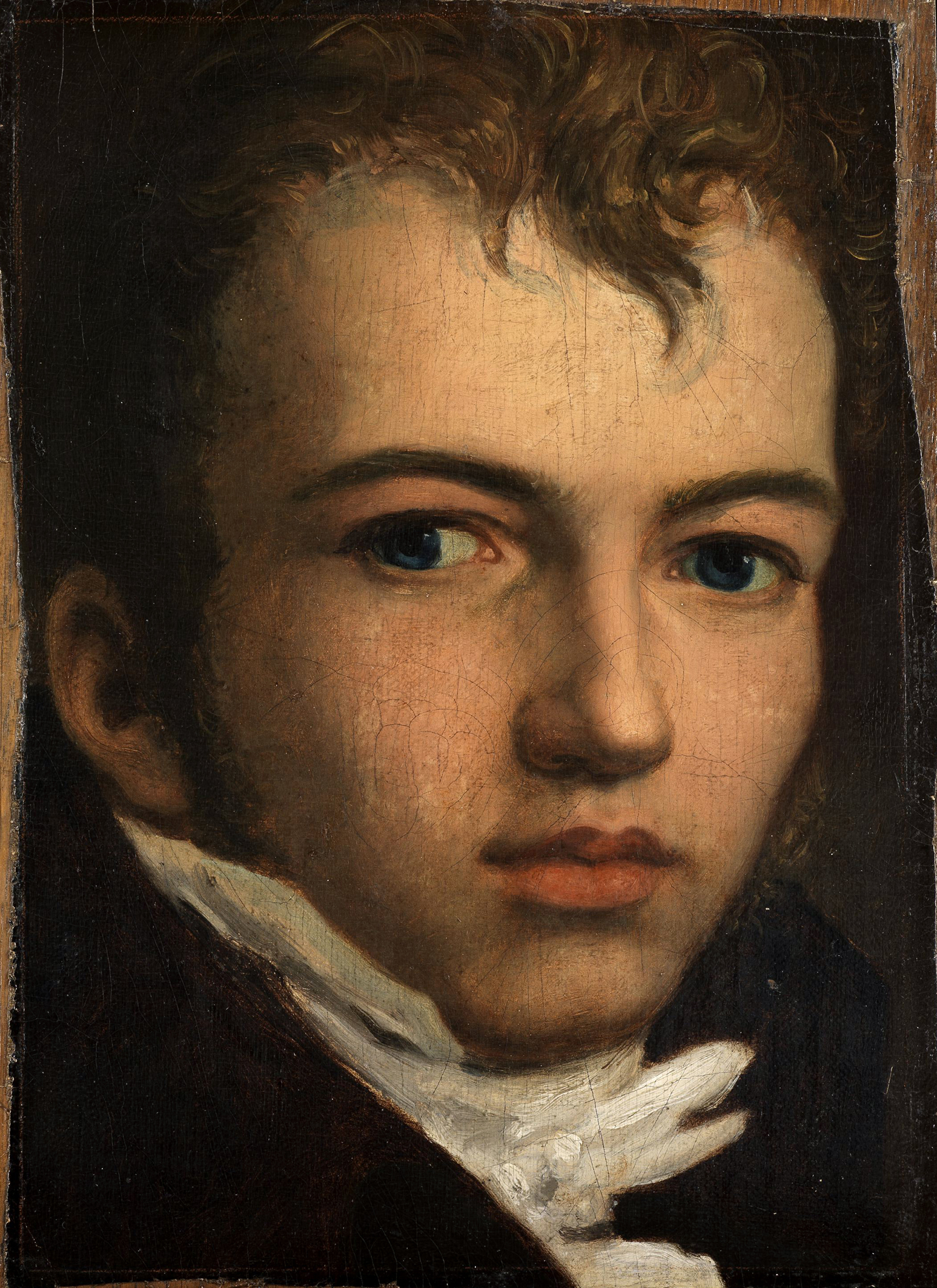
Carl Eggers; portrait by Friedrich Overbeck

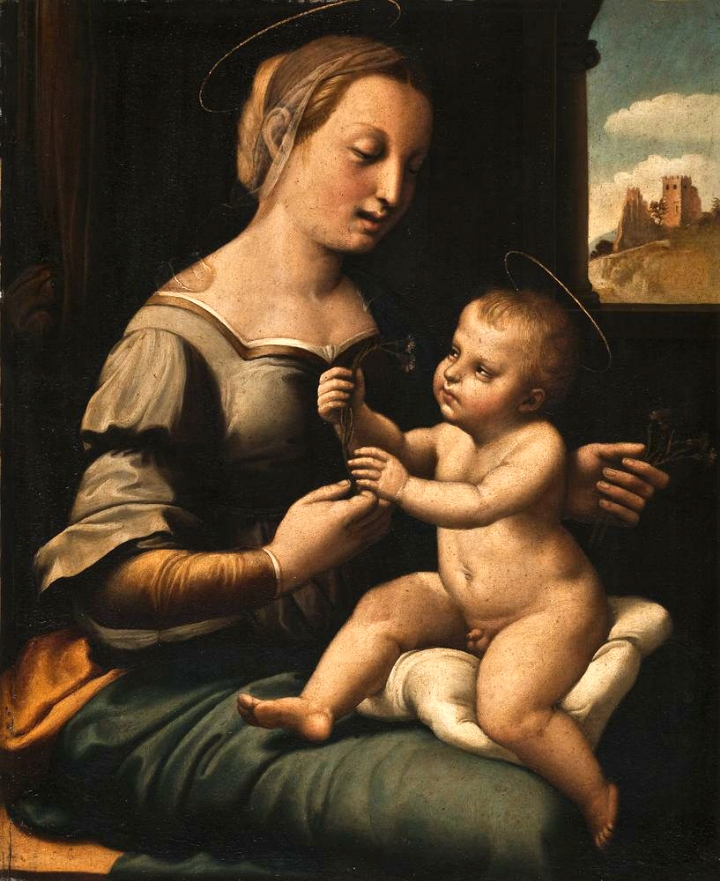
The Madonna of the Carnation

Carl Johann Adolf Eggers (1 October 1787, Neustrelitz – 24 July 1863, Neustrelitz) was a German history painter.

== Life and work ==
From 1809 to 1812, he studied at the Dresden Academy of Fine Arts, with the history painter, Friedrich Matthäi. After graduating, in 1813, he made a study trip to Italy. He returned there, three years later, and lived in Rome until 1830. There, became a member of the Nazarene movement, led by Friedrich Overbeck.

In 1819, he married Elisabeth Seitz; sister of the engraver, Johann Baptist Seitz (1786–1850).

During this time, he devoted himself primarily to fresco painting. He also made detailed examinations of older frescoes, in chemical and mechanical terms, and is credited with developing new techniques for creating them. He worked together with Philipp Veit at the Museo Chiaramonti in Vatican City, where he painted a version of Roma, the personification of the City of Rome, for the Vatican coin collection.

After returning to Germany, he created a version of "Christ Washing the Feet of the Apostles" for Naumburg Cathedral, on behalf of Canon Ampach. From 1847 to 1848, together with Wilhelm Schütze, he worked on frescoes designed by Karl Friedrich Schinkel in the hall of the Altes Museum. His frescoes in the Chapel at the cemetery in Neustrelitz have not survived.

== See also ==
- List of German painters

== Sources ==
- "Eggers, Carl". In: Allgemeines Künstlerlexikon,. Die Bildenden Künstler aller Zeiten und Völker (AKL). Vol.32, Saur, 2002, ISBN 3-598-22772-8, pp. 341 f.
- Ulrich Thieme and Felix Becker, "Eggers, Carl (Johann C.)", Allgemeines Lexikon der Bildenden Künstler von der Antike bis zur Gegenwart, vol. 10, E. A. Seemann, 1914 pp. 377–378 (Online)
