= Belozersky (surname) =

Belozersky is a Russian surname derived from the princely title, Prince of Beloozero, Prince Belozersky. Notable people with the surname include:

- Andrey Belozersky (1905–1972), Soviet Russian biologist

== See also ==
Belozersky (disambiguation)
