= Carl Adolf Senff =

German painter

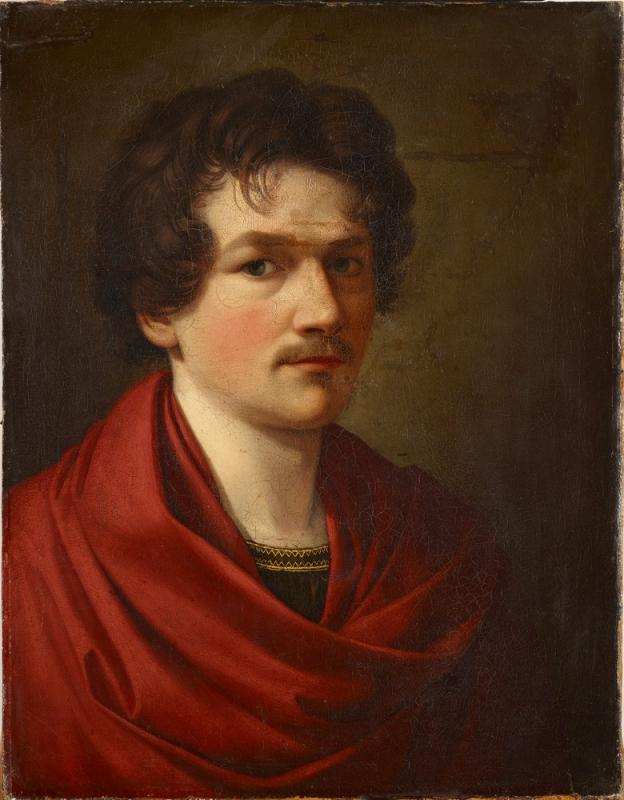
Self-portrait (1816)

Carl Adolf Senff (17 March 1785 – 21 March 1863) was a German painter in the Biedermeier style. His works are mostly portraits and still-lifes.

== Biography ==
He was born in Halle. He was the thirteenth and youngest child of Carl Friedrich Senff, a Consistorial Councilor at the Church of St. Moritz, and his wife, Rosina Dorothea née Litzmann. At first, he followed his father's wishes and attended the school at the Francke Foundations to study theology. After he had completed his studies, he worked as a teacher at a public school in Leipzig.

There, he met the writer, Johann Wilhelm Leis, and showed him drawings he had made while studying. Leis was impressed and sent some to the artist, Gerhard von Kügelgen, of Dresden, whose children were attending school in Leipzig. As a result, he decided to pursue a career in art, even though he had already started the ordination process. By 1813, he was working as a freelance portrait painter, and soon began receiving commissions.

In 1816, after a brief period as a volunteer in an infantry unit in France, he used some of his inheritance to travel; visiting Prague, Vienna and Florence before settling in Rome. He was able to find accommodations at the "Casa Buti", a home for artists whose residents included the famous sculptor, Bertel Thorvaldsen. They became friends, and Thorvaldsen helped introduce him into the artistic community of Rome. He would live there for thirty-two years.

He originally made most of his living by copying the Old Masters. In 1820, the Canon Immanuel Christian Leberecht von Ampach commissioned a painting of "Christ and the Canaanite Woman" for the Naumburg Cathedral. The following year, he was admitted to the Accademia di Belle Arti di Perugia. After 1825, he focused on still lifes with flowers and fruits, eventually becoming known as the "Raphael of Flowers". Occasionally, he would include portraits of Italian women in various regional costumes. His clients included King Frederick William II of Prussia and members of the Romanov family.

During the Revolutions of 1848, he returned to Germany. After a short stay in Berlin, he settled in Ostrau, where his eldest brother, Carl Wilhelm (1767–1850), was a pastor. Following his wife's death, in 1852, he married their adopted daughter, Auguste Charlotte Franziska Held (1811–1898).

He continued to paint prolifically until his death in 1863, shortly after his seventy-eighth birthday. As requested in his will, a linden tree was planted on his grave. It has survived and is now known as the "Professorenlinde".

== Selected paintings ==
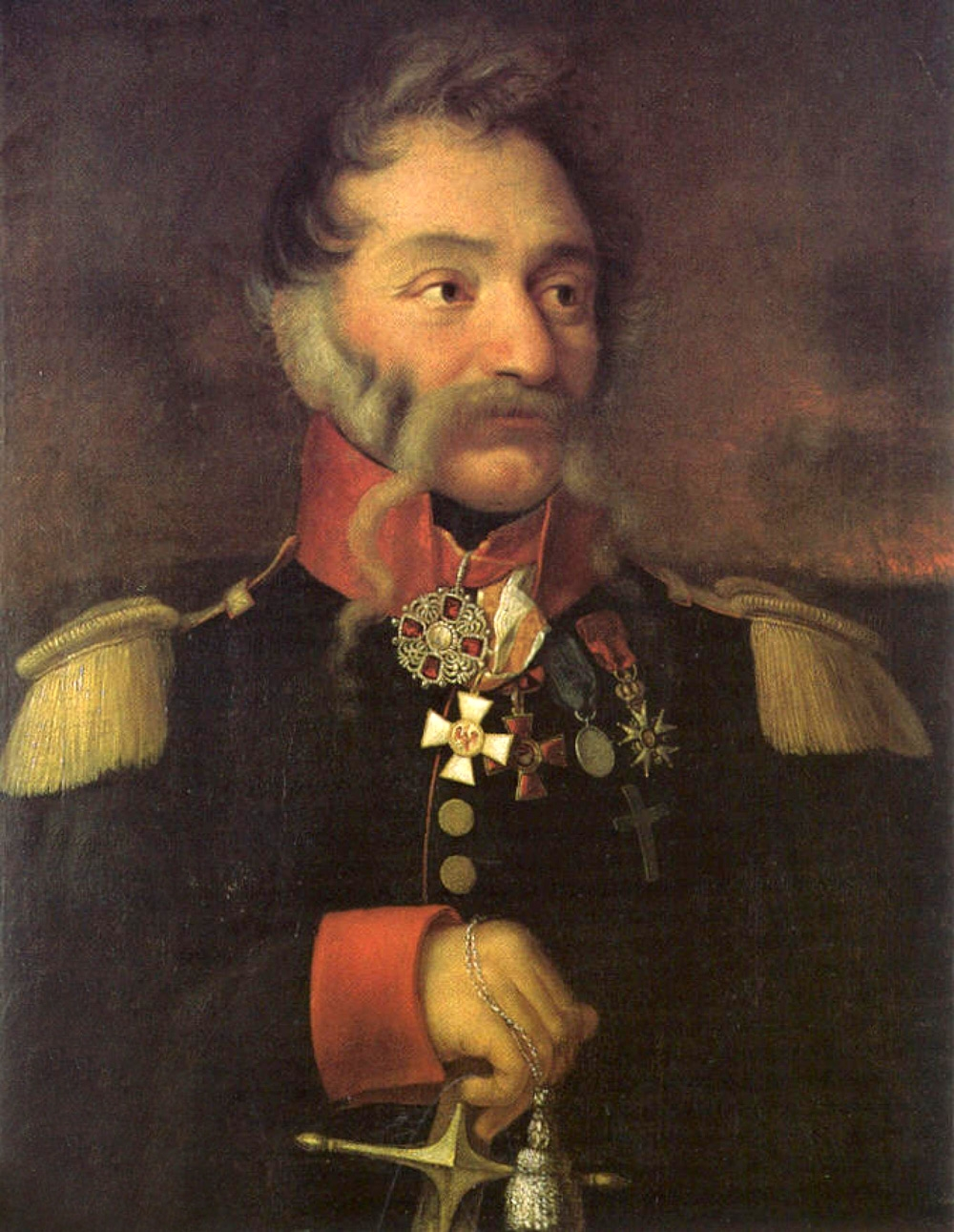
Victor von Prendel

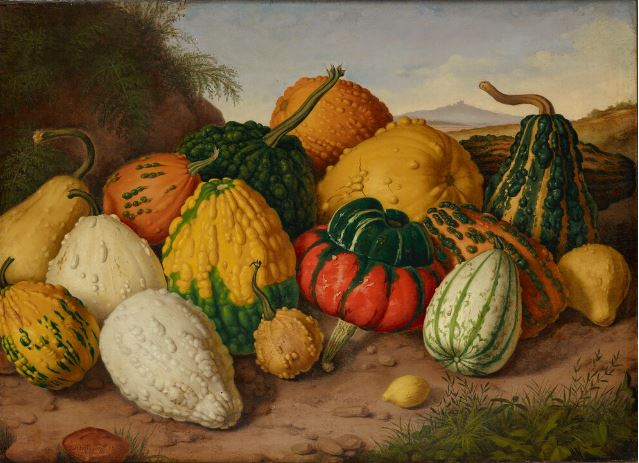
Pumpkin Still-life

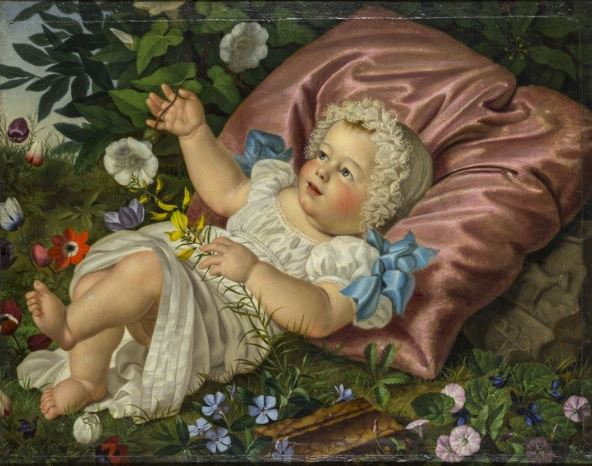
Child Among the Flowers

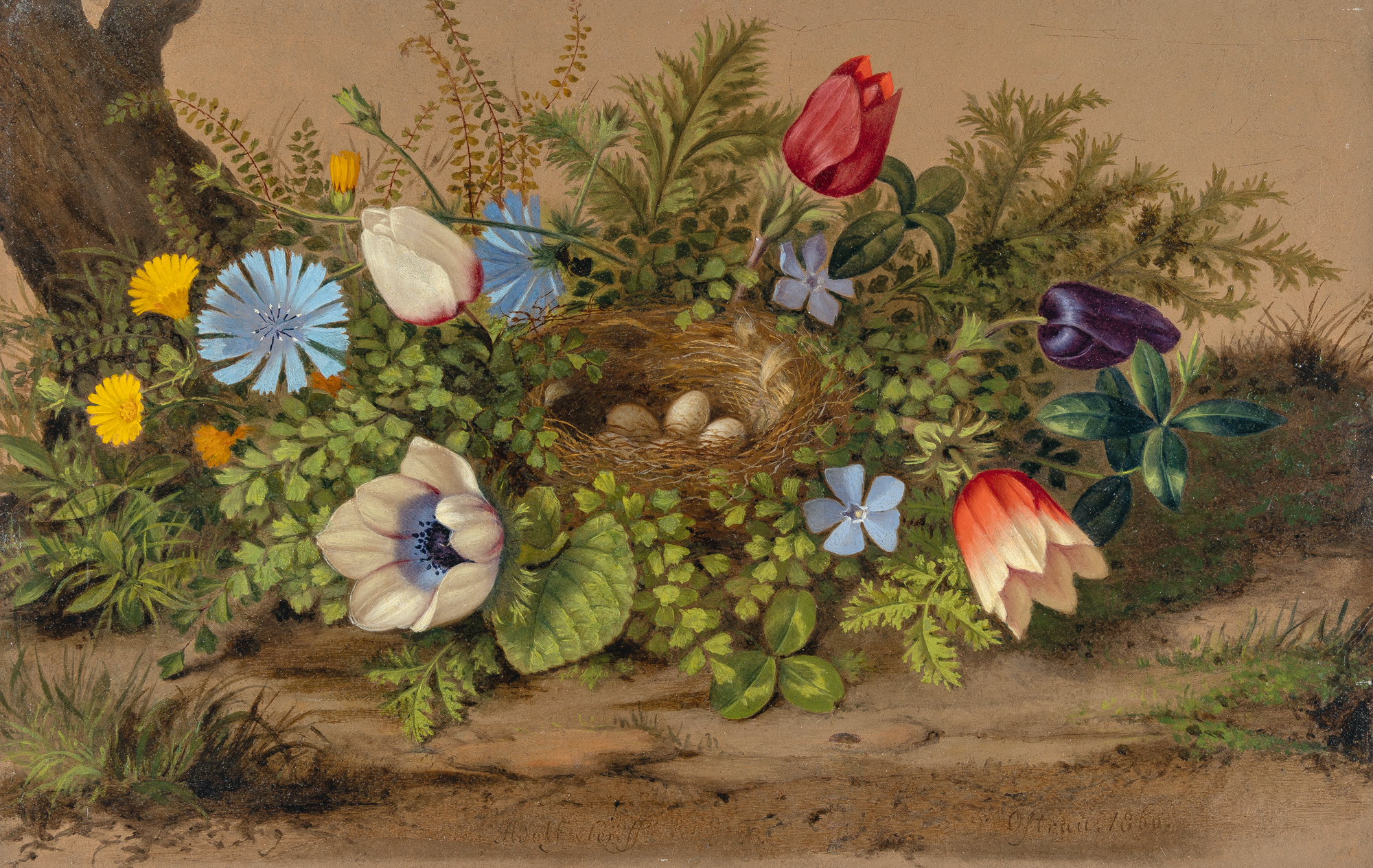
Flower-framed Nest with Eggs

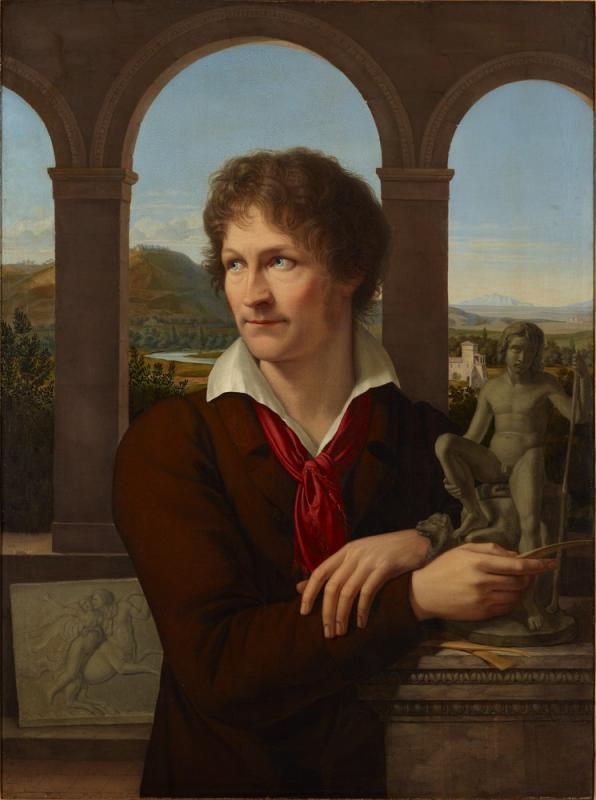
Bertel Thorvaldsen

== Sources ==
- Georg von Knorre: "Adolf Senff", In: Zeitschrift des Deutschen Vereins für Kunstwissenschaft Vol.24, Berlin, 1970.
- Bärbel Kovalevski: Adolf Senff. 1785–1863, self-published, Berlin, 2009, ISBN 978-3-9812252-5-9
- Wilhelm von Kügelgen: Jugenderinnerungen eines alten Mannes / 1802–1820, zusammengestellt von Johannes Werner, part II, chapter 2, Ob Herr Senff ein Heiliger gewesen. K.F. Köhler, Leipzig, 1924.
- Werner Meinhof: "Adolf Senff – Ein Maler der Biedermeierzeit", in: Der Rote Turm, Vol.6 (Collection of short writings on the art and cultural history of Halle), Gebauer–Schwetschke, (ca. 1930)
- Manfred Orlick: "Adolf Senff – Raffael der Blumen", In: Heimat-Jahrbuch Saalekreis , Vol.26, Merseburg 2020, pp. 30–35
- Peter Romanus, Hans Georg Sehrt, Karin Volland, Axel Wendelberger: Adolf Senff – Malerei und Zeichnungen, exhibition catalog, The State Museum, Moritzburg, and the Halle District Council, 1985
