= Belozerskoye =

Rural locality in Kurgan Oblast, Russia

Coordinates: 55°49′25″N 65°34′59″E

Belozerskoye (Russian: Белозерское) is a rural locality (a selo) and the administrative center of Belozersky District, Kurgan Oblast, Russia. Population: 4,141 (2010 census); 4,465 (2002 census); 4,519 (1989 Soviet census).
