= Knyazev =

Knyazev (Russian: Князев) is a Russian masculine surname, its feminine counterpart is Knyazeva. It may refer to

- Andrei Knyazev (footballer) (born 1974), Russian football player
- Andrei Knyazev (mathematician) (born 1959), Russian-American mathematician
- Andrei Knyazev (musician) (born 1973), Russian rock musician and songwriter
- Artem Knyazev (born 1980), Uzbekistani figure skater
- Boris Knyazev (1900–1975), Russian ballet dancer and choreographer
- Hanna Knyazeva (born 1989), Ukrainian triple jumper and long jumper
- Helena Knyazeva (born 1959), Russian philosopher
- Igor Knyazev (born 1983), Russian ice hockey defenceman
- Ivan Knyazev (born 1992), Russian football defender
- Kirill Knyazev (born 1983), Russian ice hockey player
- Olga Knyazeva (1954–2015), Soviet fencer
- Serhiy Knyazev (born 1971), Chief of Ukrainian National Police
- Svetlana Knyazeva (born 1970), Russian equestrian
- Valery Knyazev (born 1992), Russian ice hockey player
- Vyacheslav Knyazev (born 1974), Tajikistani football player
