= Ludwig Jacoby =

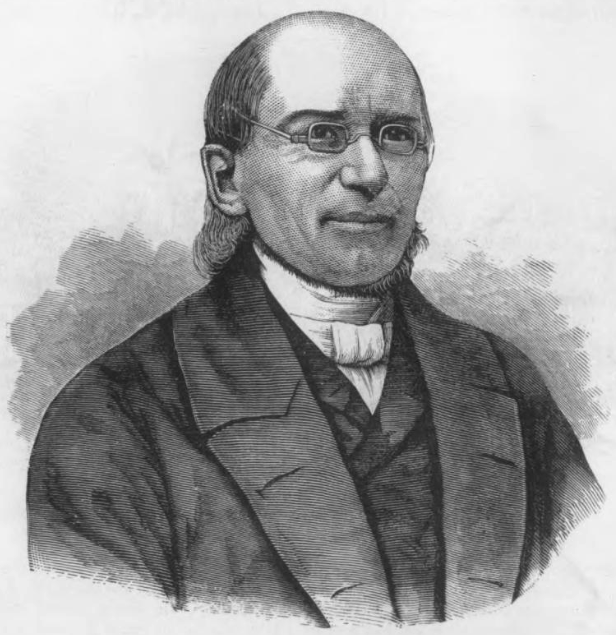
- Born: Ludwig Sigismund Jacoby; 21 October 1813; Strelitz-Alt, Mecklenburg, Germany
- Died: 21 June 1874 (aged 60); St. Louis, Missouri, United States
- Occupations: Clergyman, physician
- Spouse: Joanna Margaretha Theresia Amelia Nuelsen (m. 1839)

Ludwig Sigismund Jacoby (21 October 1813 – 21 June 1874) was a Methodist clergyman who worked in Germany and the United States.

== Biography ==
Ludwig Jacoby was born in Strelitz-Alt, Mecklenburg on 21 October 1813. He was of Jewish extraction, was converted to Christianity when about 21 years of age, and united with the Lutheran Church. He had studied medicine, and on his arrival in the United States in 1838 he settled as a physician in Cincinnati. In 1839, he was converted to Christianity by the German-American evangelist William Nast (1807-1899), who founded the German Methodist Church in this country. Ludwig Jacoby felt compelled to do mission work and Nast sent him west.

He married Joanna Margaretha Theresia Amelia Nuelsen (1814-1889) in 1839 in St. Louis, Missouri. In 1849, at his own request, he was sent to Bremen, Germany, to introduce Methodism there, and met with good success. There, for 22 years, he labored as presiding elder, editor, publishing agent, and superintendent. In 1872 he returned to the United States, was stationed at St. Louis, and in 1873 was made presiding elder of the St. Louis district.

Jacoby died in St. Louis on 21 June 1874.

== Writing ==
He published many sermons, etc., in both English and German, his chief works being:

- Geschichte des Methodismus, seiner Entstehung und Ausbreitung in den verschiedenen Theilen der Erde ("History of Methodism and its origins and propagation in different parts of the globe," Cincinnati, 1855)
- Letzte Stunden, oder die Kraft der Religion Jesu Christi im Tode ("Last hours, or the power of the religion of Jesus Christ in death," 1874)
- Kurzer Inbegriff der christlichen Glaubenslehre ("The essentials, in brief, of Christian teaching")
- Biblische Hand-Concordanz ("Compact Biblical concordance")
