= Grand principality =

Territory reigned by a grand prince or grand princess

A grand principality is the territory of whose official head of state or ruler is a monarch of the title grand prince or grand princess, and is usually used similar to how grand duchies are.

Typically in history, grand principalities have been in Eastern Europe, such as Moscow, the precursor of the Tsardom of Russia. No grand principalities remain today.

Earliest known usage of grand prince was by Vladimir the Great, who was Grand Prince of Kiev, as every other monarch of Kiev before were denoted as Prince of Kiev.

== List ==
- Grand Principality of Finland
- Grand Principality of Lithuania
- Grand Principality of Moscow
- Grand Principality of Serbia
- Grand Principality of Transylvania
- Grand Principality of Vladimir
- Grand Principality of Kiev
- Grand Principality of Hungary (also Duchy of Hungary)

== See also ==
- Grand duchy
