= Grand prince =

Title of nobility

Grand prince or great prince (Note: Latin: magnus princeps; Swedish: storfurste; German: Großfürst; Greek: Μέγας Αρχών, romanized: Megas Archon; Russian: великий князь, romanized: velikiy knyaz.) (feminine: grand princess or great princess) is a hereditary title, used either by certain monarchs or by members of certain monarchs' families.

Grand duke is the usual and established, though not literal, translation of these terms in English and the Romance languages, which do not normally use separate words for a "prince" who reigns as a monarch (e.g., Albert II, Prince of Monaco) and a "prince" who does not reign, but belongs to a monarch's family (e.g., Prince George of Wales). Some Slavic and Germanic languages do use separate words to express this concept, and in those languages, grand prince is understood as a distinct title (for a cadet of a dynasty) from grand duke (hereditary ruler ranking below a king). Some recent sources also use archduke.

The title of grand prince was once used for the sovereign of a grand principality. The last titular grand principalities vanished in 1917 and 1918, the territories being united into other monarchies or becoming republics. Already at that stage, the grand principalities of Lithuania, Transylvania and Finland had been for centuries under rulers of other, bigger monarchies, so that the title of grand prince was superseded by the titles of king and emperor there.

The title of veliky knyaz (translated as either grand prince or grand duke) was used for the Russian sovereign until Ivan IV was crowned as tsar in 1547. It is also a Russian courtesy title for members of the family of the Russian tsar (from the 17th century), although the people who held this title were not sovereigns.

== Terminology in Slavic and Baltic languages ==
Veliky knyaz (sometimes translated as "grand prince" but was generally translated as Grand Duke in state documents written in Latin), used in Slavic and Baltic languages, was the title of a medieval monarch who headed a more-or-less loose confederation whose constituent parts were ruled by lesser princes. Those grand princes' titles and positions were at the time sometimes translated as king, though kings, princes, and dukes seemingly initially did not exist amongst proto-Slavs and Balts, with knyaz being a Germanic loanword adopted by tribal chieftains. Although, the Slavic knyaz and the Baltic kunigaikštis (now usually translated as prince) are similar to kings in terms of ruling and duties. However, a veliky knyaz was usually only primus inter pares within a dynasty, primogeniture not governing the order of succession. All princes of the family were equally eligible to inherit a crown (for example, succession might be through agnatic seniority or rotation). Often other members of the dynasty ruled some constituent parts of the monarchy or country. An established use of the title was in the Kievan Rus' and in the Grand Duchy of Lithuania (from the 14th century). Thus, Veliky knyaz has been more like a regional high king (but without international recognition as such) than a "grand duke", at least, originally and was not subordinated to any other authority.

== History ==
=== Middle Ages ===
==== Hungary ====
Grand prince (Hungarian: Nagyfejedelem) was the title used by contemporary sources to name the leader of the federation of the Hungarian tribes in the 10th century. Constantine VII mentioned Árpád in his book De Administrando Imperio as megas Turkias arkhon, while Bruno of Querfurt referred to Géza in his Sancti Adalberti Pragensis episcopi et martyris vita altera as Ungarorum senior magnus. It was used by Géza and his son and heir Stephen of Hungary.

==== Serbia ====
In the Middle Ages, the Serbian veliki župan (велики жупан) was the supreme chieftain in the multi-tribal society. The title signifies overlordship, as the leader of lesser chieftains titled župan. It was used by the Serb rulers in the 11th and 12th centuries. In Greek, it was known as archizoupanos (ἄρχιζουπάνος), megazoupanos (μεγαζουπάνος) and megalos zoupanos (μεγάλος ζουπάνος).

In the 1090s, Vukan became the veliki župan in Raška (Rascia). Stefan Nemanja expelled his brother Tihomir in 1168 and assumed the title of veliki župan, as described in the Charter of Hilandar (и постави ме великог жупана). A Latin document used mega iupanus for King Stefan the First-Crowned (Stephanus dominus Seruie siue Rasie, qui mega iupanus). Afterwards, it was a high noble rank with notable holders such as Altoman Vojinović (fl. 1335–1359).

==== Russia ====
The title of grand prince (veliky knyaz) was historically used in Russia by the sovereign until the title of tsar was officially adopted by Ivan IV in 1547. In Kievan Rus', the title was given to the ruler of Kiev by chroniclers. Although other principalities emerged, the grand prince of Kiev was recognized as the leading prince, although his actual powers gradually diminished during the 12th and 13th centuries, and other branches of the ruling dynasty claimed the grand princely title for themselves. The title of grand prince of Vladimir was considered to be the most prestigious among Russian princes, and following the Mongol invasions, the title of grand prince of Kiev no longer had any significance. By the late 14th century, the principalities of Vladimir and Moscow were merged, and under the grand princes of Moscow, the title grew from little more than a literary embellishment to one with clear legal overtones, especially as the ruler of Moscow pursued a policy of centralization. The title of grand prince of all Russia, which originally had a literary character, also became used by the rulers of Moscow in external relations. Under Ivan III, this title was converted into sovereign (gosudar) of all Russia.

==== Polish–Lithuanian Commonwealth ====
The Lithuanian title Didysis kunigaikštis was used by the rulers of Lithuania, and after 1569, it was one of two main titles used by the monarch of the Polish–Lithuanian Commonwealth. The kings of Poland from the Swedish House of Vasa also used this title for their non-Polish territories. This Lithuanian title was sometimes Latinized as Magnus Dux, or grand duke.

During the feudal fragmentation of Poland (1138–1320), the title Książę senior was used in the Seniorate Province usually translated as "high duke".

=== Modern history ===
In 1582, King Johan III of Sweden added grand prince of Finland to the subsidiary titles of the Swedish kings; however, it did not have any territorial or civic implications, as Finland was already fully integrated into the Swedish realm.

The Holy Roman Empire ruling house of Habsburg instituted a similar Grand Principality in Transylvania (Siebenburgen) in 1765.

After the Russian conquests, the title continued to be used by the Russian emperor in his role as ruler of Lithuania (1793–1918) and of the Grand Duchy of Finland (1809–1917) as well. His titulary included, among other titles: Grand Prince of Smolensk, Volynia, Podolia", "Sovereign and Grand Prince of Nizhny Novgorod, Chernigov" etc.

A more literal translation of the Russian title veliky knyaz than "grand duke" would be "great prince" — especially in the pre-Petrine era — but the term is neither standard nor widely used in English. However, in German, a Russian veliky knyaz was known as a Großfürst, in Swedish as a Storfurste and in Latin as Magnus Princeps.

Grand prince remained as a dynastic title for the senior members of the Romanov dynasty in Russia's imperial era. The title veliky knyaz, its use finally formalized by Alexander III, then belonged to children and male-line grandchildren of the emperors of Russia. The daughters and paternal granddaughters of the emperors used a different version of the title velikaya knyazhna from females who obtained it as the consorts of Russian grand princes. In modern times, a Russian veliky knyaz or velikaya knyazhnais styled "Imperial Highness".

The title of grand prince was also used for the heir apparent to the Grand Duchy of Tuscany.

== See also ==
- Imperial, royal and noble ranks
