= Grand duke =

Royal title

Grand duke (feminine: grand duchess) is a European hereditary title, used either by certain monarchs or by members of certain monarchs' families. The title is used in some current and former independent monarchies in Europe titled as Grand Duchy, particularly:

- in present-day Luxembourg, the last territory ranked as Grand Duchy
- historically by the sovereigns of former independent countries, such as Tuscany (from 1569 to 1860, now part of Italy)
- in Baden, Hesse, Oldenburg, Mecklenburg-Schwerin, Mecklenburg-Strelitz and Saxe-Weimar-Eisenach (officially simply the Grand Duchy of Saxony) – grand duchies from 1815 to 1918, and all now part of Germany
- formerly also in some countries in Northern Europe, such as the Grand Duchy of Finland or the Grand Duchy of Lithuania
- currently by claimants to the Russian Imperial Throne (eg. Grand Duke George Mikhailovich of Russia)

== Western and Central European ==
The term grand duke as a monarch reigning over an independent state was a later invention (in Western Europe at first in 1569 for the ruler of Tuscany) to denote either a particularly mighty duke or a monarchy playing an important political, military and/or economic role. It arose because the title of duke had gradually lost status and precedence during the Middle Ages by having been granted to rulers of relatively small fiefs (feudal territories), instead of the large tribal regions or even national territories to which the title was once attached.

One of the first examples occurred when Count Gonçalo I Mendes of Portucale (in northwest Portugal and considered as that country's original nucleus) took, in 987, the personal title of Magnus Dux Portucalensium ("Grand Duke of the Portuguese") and rebelled against his feudal lord, King Bermudo II of León. He was defeated by the royal armies but nevertheless obtained a remarkable autonomy as a Magnus Dux (Grand Duke), leading ultimately to Portuguese independence from the Spanish kingdom of Castille-León.

Another example was the line of self-proclaimed grand dukes (legally dukes) of Burgundy in the 15th century, when they ruled most of present-day northeastern France as well as almost the entire Low Countries. They tried—ultimately without success—to create from these territories under their control a new unified country between the Kingdom of France in the west and the Holy Roman Empire (mainly present-day Germany) in the east. Philip III, Duke of Burgundy (reigned 1419–67) assumed the subsidiary, legally void style and title of "Grand Duke of the West" in 1435, having previously brought the duchies of Brabant and Limburg as well as the counties of Holland, Zeeland, Friesland, Hainaut and Namur into his possession. His son and successor Charles the Bold (reigned 1467–77) continued to use the same style and title.

The title magnus dux or grand duke (Kunigų kunigas, Didysis kunigaikštisin Lithuanian) has been used by the rulers of Lithuania, who after Jogaila also became kings of Poland. From 1573, both the Latin version and its Polish equivalent wielki książę (literally "grand prince"), the monarchic title of the rulers of Lithuania as well as of (western) Russia, Prussia, Mazovia, Samogithia, Kiev, Volhynia, Podolia, Podlachia, Livonia, Smolensk, Severia and Chernigov (including hollow claims nurtured by ambition), were used as part of their full official monarchic titles by the Kings (Polish: król) of Poland during the Polish–Lithuanian Commonwealth.

The first monarchs ever officially titled grand duke were the Medici sovereigns of Tuscany, starting from the late 16th century. This official title was granted by Pope Pius V in 1569 to Cosimo I de' Medici.

Napoleon I awarded the title extensively: during his era, several of his allies (and de facto vassals) were allowed to assume the title of grand duke, usually at the same time as their inherited fiefs (or fiefs granted by Napoleon) were enlarged by annexed territories previously belonging to enemies defeated on the battlefield. After Napoleon's downfall, the victorious powers who met at the Congress of Vienna, which dealt with the political aftermath of the Napoleonic Wars, agreed to abolish the Grand Duchies created by Bonaparte and to create a group of monarchies of intermediate importance with that title. Thus the 19th century saw a new group of monarchs titled grand duke in central Europe, especially in present-day Germany. The title was also used for the part of Poland granted to Prussia – the Grand Duchy of Posen – which was formally held in a personal union with Prussia (and so nominally separate) until its incorporation in 1848.

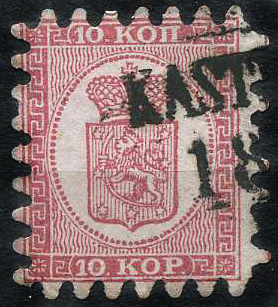
1860 postage stamp of the Grand Duchy of Finland

In the same century, the purely ceremonial version of the title grand duke in Russia (in fact the western translation of the Russian title "grand prince" granted to the siblings of the tsar) expanded massively because of the large number of progeny of the ruling House of Romanov during those decades.

In the German and Dutch languages, which have separate words for a prince as the issue (child) of a monarch (respectively Prinz, Prins) and for a sovereign prince (Fürst, Vorst), there is also a clear linguistic difference between a sovereign grand duke reigning over a state of central and western Europe (Großherzog, Groothertog) and a non-sovereign, purely ceremonial grand duke of either the Russian imperial family or other non-sovereign territories that are de facto dependencies of a major power (Großfürst, Grootvorst).

In 1582, King John III of Sweden added "Grand Duke of Finland" to the subsidiary titles of the Swedish kings, but without any political consequences, as Finland was already a part of the Swedish realm.

After the Russian conquests, the title continued to be used by the Russian emperors in their role as rulers of both (de facto non-sovereign) Lithuania (1793–1917) and the (equally non-sovereign) autonomous Finland (1809–1917). The Habsburg monarchy also instituted the similarly non-sovereign Großfürstentum Siebenbürgen (Grand Principality of Transylvania) in 1765, and the (purely nominal) Großherzogtum Krakau (Grand Duchy of Kraków) in 1846.

== Balkans ==
=== Byzantine grand dukes ===
The Latin title dux (the etymological root of duke), which was phonetically rendered doux (δούξ) in Greek, was a common title for imperial generals in the Late Roman Empires (west and east), but note it was lower in rank than comes (the etymological root of count).

Under the latter, exclusively Byzantine theme system, the commander of a theme was often styled a doux instead of the earlier strategos from the 10th century on. The title of "Grand Duke" (megas doux) was created by Alexios I Komnenos and was conferred upon the commanding admiral of the Byzantine navy. As such, it was an actual office rather than a court rank (although it also became a grade in the court order of precedence under the Palaiologan emperors), and was always held by one individual.

=== Bosnian grand dukes ===
Grand Duke of Bosnia (Serbo-Croatian: Veliki Vojvoda Bosanski; Latin: Bosne supremus voivoda / Sicut supremus voivoda regni Bosniae) was a court title in the Kingdom of Bosnia, bestowed by the king to highest military commanders, usually reserved for most influential and most capable among highest Bosnian nobility. To interpret it as an office post rather than a court rank could be even more accurate. Unlike usage in Western Europe, Central Europe, or in various Slavic lands from Central to North-East Europe, where analogy between grand duke and grand prince was significant, with both titles corresponding to sovereign lower than king but higher than duke. In Bosnia, the title grand duke corresponded more to the Byzantine military title megas doux. It is possible to register some similarities with equivalent titles in neighboring Slavic lands, such as Serbia; however, in neighboring countries, the title duke, in Slavic vojvoda, also had military significance, but in that sense "grand duke" was specifically, even exclusively, Bosnian title.

== Eastern European ==
=== Ruthenian/Ukrainian grand dukes ===
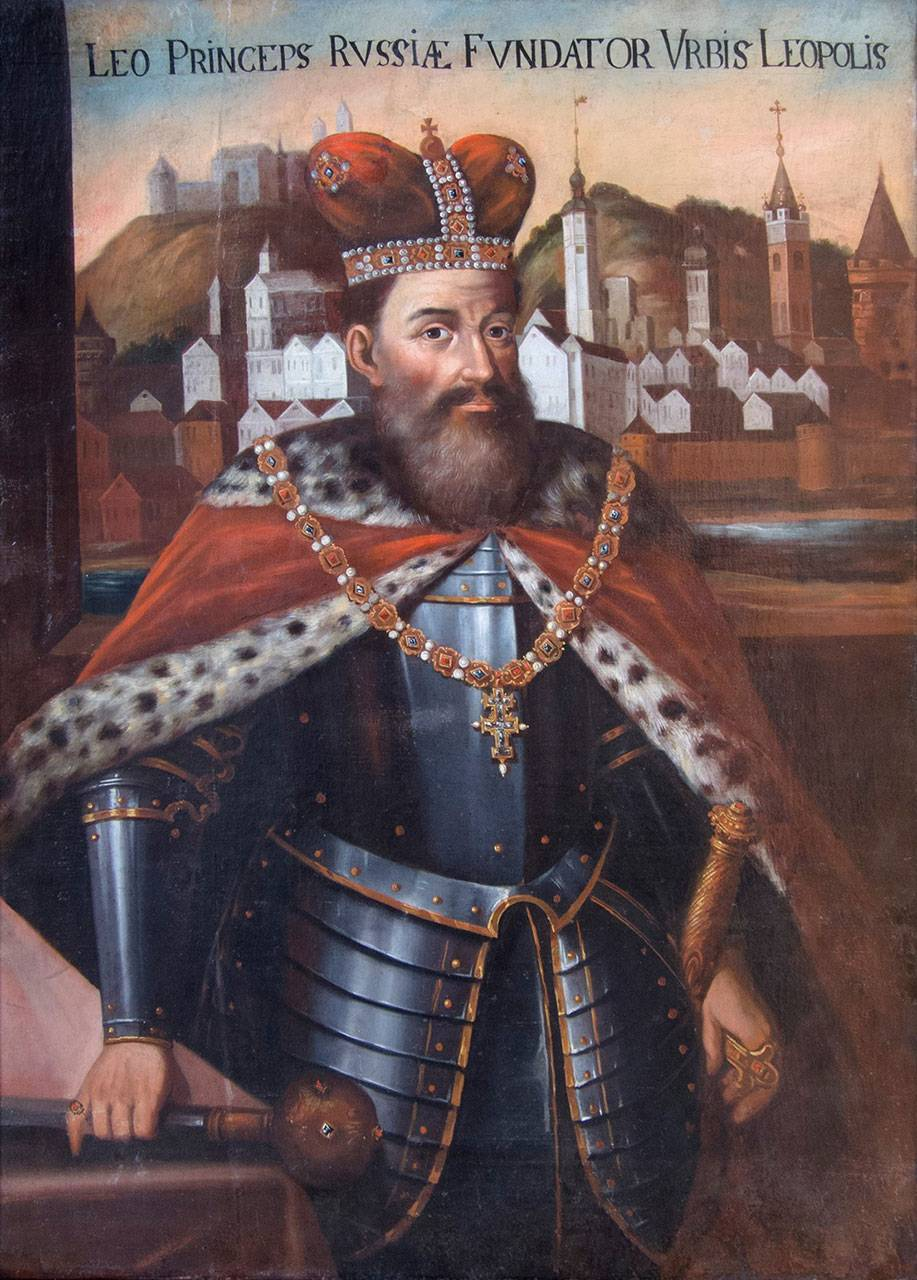
Portrait of Leo I, King of Ruthenia and Grand Duke of Kiev (18th-century painting)

"Grand duke" is the traditional translation of the title Velyky Knyaz (Великий Князь), which from the 11th century was at first the title of the leading prince (Kniaz) of Kievan Rus', then of several other East Slavic princes. The title of Grand Duke of Kiev was usually given by a father to his eldest son, and with his death passed to the next oldest sibling. This system didn’t last very long, and in 12th century multiple northern princes of the Rurikid Dynasty could compete for their dominance in Kiev. Some of them would prefer to establish themselves as grand dukes independently from Kiev.

Another translation of this title would be grand prince. While this term is a more precise translation, it is neither standard nor widely used in English. In German, however, grand duke was known as a Großfürst, and in Latin as magnus princeps.

With the decline of Kiev under the Mongols in the 13th century, Danylo of Galicia would be crowned as king of Ruthenia to show succession between Kiev and Galicia, while keeping the title of Grand Duke of Kiev. With the expansion of the Grand Duchy of Lithuania into Ukrainian lands, Lithuanian princes would take the title of Grand Dukes of Ruthenia, until their unification with Poland.

=== Lithuanian grand dukes ===
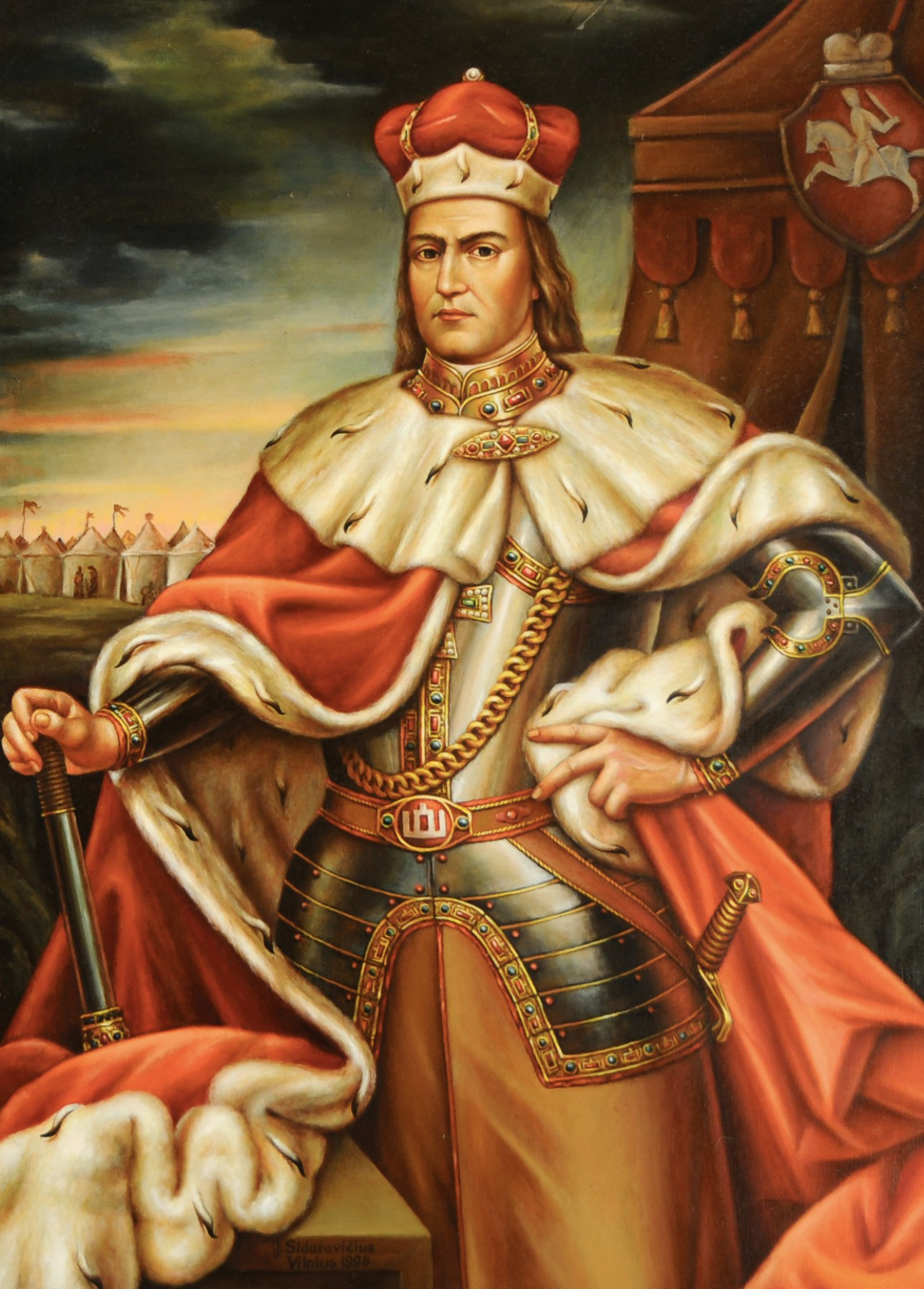
Painting of Vytautas the Great, Grand Duke of Lithuania

Throughout the history of Lithuania from 1230s to 1795, most of its leaders were referred to as Grand Duke of Lithuania, even when they jointly held the title King of Poland and other titles.

=== Russian grand dukes ===
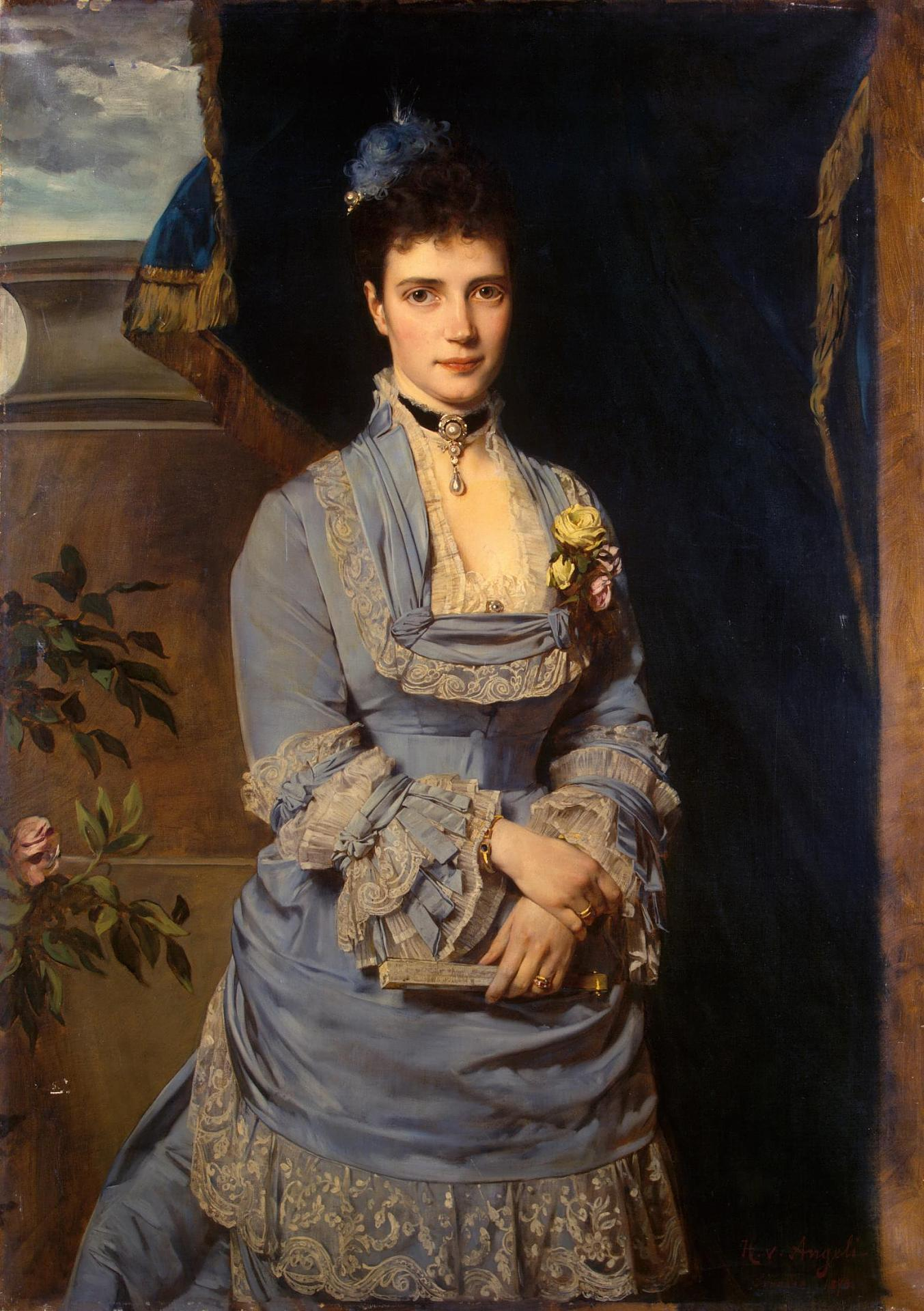
Portrait of Grand Duchess Maria Fiodorovna by Heinrich von Angeli (1874) Saint Petersburg, Hermitage Museum

From 1328 the Velikii Kniaz of Muscovy appeared as the grand duke for "all of Russia" until Ivan IV of Russia in 1547 was crowned as tsar. Thereafter the title was given to sons and grandsons (through male lines) of the Tsars and Emperors of Russia. The daughters and paternal granddaughters of Russian emperors, as well as the consorts of Russian grand dukes, were generally called "grand duchesses" in English.

From 1809 to 1917 the Emperor of Russia was also the Grand Duke of Finland, which he held as an autonomous state. Before the Russian conquest Finland had been held by the Kings of Sweden, first as a royal duchy, since 1581 with the King assuming the secondary title Grand Duke of Finland (Finnish: Suomen suuriruhtinas, Swedish: Storfurste av Finland).

== Grand prince ==
Grand princes (or sometimes great princes) were medieval monarchs who usually ruled over several tribes and/or were feudal overlords of other princes. At the time, the title was usually translated as "king", sometimes also as "minor king" or "little king" (German: Kleinkönig).

Grand princes reigned in Central and Eastern Europe, notably among Slavs and Lithuanians.

The title "grand prince" translates to velikiy knjaz (Великий князь) in Ukrainian and Russian. The Slavic word knjaz and the Lithuanian kunigas (today translated as "priest") are cognates of the word king in its original meaning of "ruler". Thus, the literal meaning of Veliki Knjaz and Didysis kunigaikštis was more like "great ruler" than "grand duke".

With the growing importance and size of their countries, those monarchs claimed a higher title, such as king or tsar (also spelled "czar" in English) which was derived from the Latin caesar ("emperor") and based on the claim to be the legitimate successors of the Byzantine-East Roman Emperors. Grand Prince Ivan IV of Muscovy was the last monarch to reign without claiming any higher title, until he finally assumed the style Tsar of Russia in 1547.

The rulers of the Turkish vassal state of Transylvania (German: Siebenbürgen) used the title of grand prince; this title was later assumed by the Habsburgs after their conquest of Hungary. The Polish kings of the Swedish House of Vasa also used the grand-princely title for their non-Polish territories.

In the late Middle Ages, the title "grand prince/grand duke" became increasingly a purely ceremonial courtesy title for close relatives of ruling monarchs, such as the Tsar of Russia, who granted his brothers the title Grand Duke of Russia (veliki knjaz).

== Styles and forms of address ==
Most often, a sovereign grand duke was styled as "Royal Highness" (abbreviated "HRH"), possibly because of the connection of many grand-ducal houses to royal ones or as the highest style beneath that of a king (sometimes styled "Royal Highness"). The heir to the throne (a hereditary grand duke) was sometimes styled as "Royal Highness", otherwise as "Grand Ducal Highness" (HGDH). Junior members of the family also generally bore the lower title of prince or princess with the style of "Grand Ducal Highness". However, in other grand duchies (e.g., Oldenburg), junior members of the family bore the title of duke or duchess, with the style of "Highness" (HH).

The Grand Ducal Family of Luxembourg styles all its members as "Royal Highness" since 1919, due to their being also cadet members of the Royal and Ducal House of Bourbon-Parma as male-line descendants of Prince Felix of Bourbon-Parma.

The Habsburg grand dukes of Tuscany, being members of the imperial family of Austria, were styled as "Imperial and Royal Highness" (HI&RH).

Grand dukes and grand duchesses from Russia were styled as "Imperial Highness" (HIH), being members of the Russian Imperial Family.

== See also ==
- Archduke
- Fürst
- List of grand duchesses of Russia
- List of grand dukes of Russia
- Nobility
- Royal and noble ranks
- Veliki vojvoda
