= List of artists from Mecklenburg =

The following is a list of artists from, or associated with, the historical region of Mecklenburg, now part of the German state of Mecklenburg-Vorpommern.

== List ==
Name	Born	Died	Place	Art form	Style/Movement	Note
Anna Kovalchuk	1977		Neustrelitz	Actress		
Anne Helm	1986		Rostock	Voice actress		
Annelies Burmeister	1928	1988	Ludwigslust	Actress		
Annie Krull	1876	1947	Tessin	Opera singer (soprano)		
Albert Ellmenreich	1816	1905	Schwerin	Composer		
Albert Wolff	1814	1892	Neustrelitz	Sculptor		
Alfred Meyer	1882	1956	Schwerin	Writer		
Barbara Klünder	1919	1988	Althagen	Ceramics		
Bernd Spier	1944	2017	Ludwigslust	Singer	Schlager	
Brigitte Ringeling	1921	1994	Bad Doberan	Ceramics		
Carl Eggers	1787	1863	Neustrelitz	Painter	Nazarene movement	
Carl Hinrichs	1903	1990	Schwerin	Painter		
Carl Malchin	1838	1923	Kröpelin	Painter		
Carl Suhrlandt	1828	1919	Ludwigslust	Painter		
Charles Philippe Dieussart	1625	1696	Laage	Architect	Baroque	
Charly Hübner	1972		Neustrelitz	Actor		
Christoph Biemann	1952		Ludwigslust	Director		
Christian Doermer	1935	2022	Rostock	Actor		
Christiane Klonz	1969		Lübz	Composer	Classical music	
Cornelius Krommeny	1500s	1599	Güstrow	Painter	Court painter	
Daniel Friderici	1584	1638	Rostock	Composer	Cantor	
David Timm	1969		Waren	Conductor	Jazz	
Dora Koch-Stetter	1881	1968	Althagen	Painter		
Dorothee Rätsch	1940		Passentin	Sculptor		
Egon Tschirch	1889	1948	Rostock	Painter	Expressionism	
Elisabeth Sophie of Mecklenburg	1613	1676	Güstrow	Poet		
Elise Blumann	1897	1990	Parchim	Painter	Expressionism	
Elizabeth of Hesse-Kassel	1596	1625	Güstrow	Poet		
Emilie Mayer	1812	1883	Friedland	Composer	Romanticism	
Ernst Barlach	1870	1938	Güstrow	Sculptor	Expressionism	
Erich zu Putlitz	1892	1945	Brahlstorf	Architect	Nazi architecture	
Erik Smith	1931	2004	Rostock	Pianist	Classical music	
Erika Dunkelmann	1913	2000	Rostock	Actress		
Franz Benque	1841	1921	Ludwigslust	Photographer		
Franz Bunke	1857	1939	Schwaan	Painter	Realism	
Franziska Ellmenreich	1847	1931	Schwerin	Actress		
Franziska Knuppe	1974		Rostock	Actress		
Friederike Ellmenreich	1775	1845	Schwerin	Opera singer (contralto)		
Friedrich Griese	1890	1975	Lehsten	Writer	Völkisch movement	
Friedrich Lange	1834	1875	Plau am See	Painter	Nazarene movement	
Friedrich Ludwig Schröder	1744	1816	Schwerin	Actor		
Friedrich Wachenhusen	1859	1925	Schwerin	Painter		
Fritz Greve	1863	1931	Malchin	Painter		
Fritz Hollenbeck	1929	2021	Lübz	Actor		
Fritz Koch-Gotha	1877	1956	Althagen	Illustrator		
Fritz Reuter	1810	1874	Stavenhagen	Writer		
Georg David Matthieu	1737	1778	Ludwigslust	Painter	Portrait painting	
Gerd Brenneis	1930	2003	Nienhagen	Opera singer (tenor)		
Gerhard Baumann	1921	2006	Klein Rogahn	Composer	Martial music	
Gerhard Marcks	1889	1981	Niehagen	Sculptor		
Gerhard Ringeling	1887	1951	Schönberg	Writer		
Gertrud Kleinhempel	1875	1948	Althagen	Designer		
Guglielmo Plüschow	1852	1930	Wismar	Photographer		
Gun-Brit Barkmin	1971		Rostock	Opera singer (soprano)		
Günther Uecker	1930	2025	Wendorf	Sculptor	ZERO	
Gustav Hinrichs	1850	1942	Grabow	Composer	Romanticism	
Gustav Ritter	1867	1945	Grabow	Writer	Völkisch movement	
HA Schult	1939		Parchim	Performance artist	Conceptualism	
Hanne-Lore Kuhse	1925	1999	Schwaan	Opera singer (soprano)		
Hanning Schröder	1896	1987	Rostock	Composer		
Hans Franck	1879	1964	Schwerin	Writer	Die Kogge	
Hans G. Helms	1932	2012	Teterow	Writer	Jazz	
Hans Gahlenbeck	1896	1975	Rostock	Conductor		
Hans Mierendorff	1882	1955	Rostock	Actor		
Hermann Schepler	1911	1993	Grabow	Painter		
Heiko Mathias Förster	1966		Crivitz	Conductor		
Heiner Carow	1929	1997	Rostock	Screenwriter		
Heinrich Alexander Stoll	1910	1977	Parchim	Writer		
Heinrich Pommerencke	1821	1873	Plate	Painter	Portrait painting	
Heinz Kippnick	1928	2019	Schwerin	Heraldist		
Helene Weyl	1893	1948	Ribnitz	Writer		
Hermann Koch	1856	1939	Dömitz	Painter		
Hermann Ritter	1849	1926	Wismar	Composer		
Henriette von Bissing	1798	1879	Waren	Narrator		
Hinnerk Schönemann	1974		Rostock	Actor		
Ida, Countess von Hahn-Hahn	1805	1880	Tressow	Writer		
Ingrid Bachér	1930		Rostock	Writer	Group 47	
Jessie Rindom	1903	1981	Rostock	Actress		
Jing Xiang	1993		Rostock	Actress		
Jo Jastram	1928	2011	Rostock	Sculptor		
Johann Heinrich Suhrlandt	1742	1827	Schwerin	Painter		
Johann Jakob Engel	1741	1802	Parchim	Writer		
Johann Leopold Abel	1795	1871	Ludwigslust	Composer		
Johanna Beckmann	1868	1941	Burg Stargard	Porcelain painter		
Johannes Gillhoff	1861	1930	Glaisin	Writer		
Jörg Pose	1959		Rostock	Actor		
Jule Böwe	1969		Rostock	Actress		
Jürgen Frohriep	1928	1993	Rostock	Actor		
Karl Graedener	1812	1883	Rostock	Composer	Opera	
Karl Rettich	1841	1904	Rosenhagen	Painter		
Karl Scharnweber	1950		Rostock	Organist	Jazz	
Katharina Brauren	1910	1998	Grabow	Actress		
Katrin Sass	1956		Schwerin	Actress		
Käthe Miethe	1893	1961	Althagen	Writer		
Kirsten Nilsson	1931	2017	Voigtsdorf	Cabaret performer		
Klaus Grünberg	1941		Wismar	Actor		
Klaus Lass	1950		Rostock	Singer-songwriter	Country music	Member of De Plattfööt
Konrad Ernst Ackermann	1710	1771	Schwerin	Actor		
Leonhard Adelt	1881	1945	Boizenburg	Writer		
Leopold August Abel	1718	1794	Ludwigslust	Composer		
Louise Abel	1841	1907	Goldberg	Photographer		
Ludwig Brunow	1843	1913	Lutheran	Sculptor		
Ludwig Gotthard Kosegarten	1758	1818	Grevesmühlen	Poet		
Luise Mühlbach	1814	1873	Neubrandenburg	Writer	Historical fiction	
Manfred W. Jürgens	1956		Grevesmühlen	Painter		
Margarete Scheel	1881	1969	Rostock	Sculptor	Free Secession	
Maria Bard	1900	1944	Schwerin	Actress		
Marie Hager	1872	1947	Burg Stargard	Painter		
Marie Kundt	1870	1932	Neustrelitz	Photographer		
Marianne Hoppe	1909	2002	Rostock	Actress		
Martha Rose-Grabow	1858	1940	Grabow	Painter		
Marteria	1982		Rostock	Rapper	German hip-hop	
Martin Brauer	1971	2021	Rostock	Actor		
Manfred Osten	1938		Ludwigslust	Poet		
Max Burghardt	1893	1977	Schwerin	Actor		
Oliver Riedel	1971		Schwerin	Bassist	Neue Deutsche Härte	Member of Rammstein
Paul Gösch	1885	1940	Schwerin	Painter	Expressionism	
Paul Wallat	1879	1966	Rostock	Sculptor		
Pauline Soltau	1833	1902	Ludwigslust	Painter	Genre art	
Peter Borgelt	1927	1994	Rostock	Actor		
Peter Wawerzinek	1954		Rostock	Writer		
Pyranja	1978		Rostock	Rapper	German hip-hop	
Rudolf Ahlers	1889	1954	Neubrandenburg	Writer	Völkisch movement	
Rudolf Tarnow	1867	1933	Parchim	Writer		
Rudolph Suhrlandt	1781	1862	Ludwigslust	Painter	Portrait painting	
Sebastian Schulz	1977		Rostock	Voice actor		
Sigrid Alegría	1974		Rostock	Actress		
Theodor Körner	1791	1813	Rosenow	Poet		Killed in action while temporarily in Mecklenburg
Theodor Martens	1822	1884	Wismar	Painter		
Theodor Reichmann	1849	1903	Rostock	Opera singer (baritone)		
Thomas Böttger	1957		Neustrelitz	Composer		
Ursula Kurz	1923	2018	Wittenburg	Poet		
Ute Christensen	1955		Neubrandenburg	Actress		
Volker Handloik	1961	2001	Rostock	Saxophonist	Jazz	
Volkwin Marg	1936		Grabow	Architect		Grew up in Grabow (1949–1957)
Walter Kempowski	1929	2007	Rostock	Writer		
Wilhelmine Suhrlandt	1803	1863	Ludwigslust	Lithographer		
Wilhelm Facklam	1898	1972	Upahl	Painter		
Wilhelm Neumann	1849	1919	Grevesmühlen	Architect	Historicism	
Wilhelm Titel	1784	1862	Boltenhagen	Painter	Portrait painting	
Wilhelm Langschmidt	1805	1866	Grabow	Painter		
Wilhelm von Gloeden	1856	1931	Wismar	Photographer		
Wilhelm Wandschneider	1866	1942	Plau am See	Sculptor		
Wolfgang Büttner	1912	1990	Rostock	Actor		
Wolfgang Rieck	1953		Rostock	Singer-songwriter	Folk	

== See also ==
- Category:Artists from Mecklenburg-Vorpommern
- List of German artists
