= Suhrlandt =

Suhrlandt is a family name of German origins, and may refer to:

- Carl Suhrlandt (1828–1919), German painter
- Johann Heinrich Suhrlandt (1742–1827), German royal court painter
- Pauline Soltau (1833–1902), born as Pauline Suhrlandt, German painter, and violinist
- Rudolph Suhrlandt (1781–1862), German portrait painter, lithographer
- Wilhelmine Suhrlandt (1803–1863), German lithographer
