= Ellmenreich =

Ellmenreich is a German surname. Notable people with the surname include:

- Albert Ellmenreich (1816–1905), German actor, writer, singer, and composer
- Franziska Ellmenreich (1847–1931), German stage actress
- Friederike Ellmenreich (1775–1845), German actress
