= Philipp Gufler =

German artist

Philipp Gufler (born June 23, 1989) is a German artist.

== Early life and education ==
Philipp Gufler was born in Augsburg and studied at the Academy of Fine Arts in Munich. He attended artist residencies at De Ateliers, Amsterdam, Netherlands (2015–2017), Skowhegan School of Painting & Sculpture, Maine, USA (2019) and Delfina Foundation, London, UK (2021), among others.

He lives in Amsterdam and Munich. He is an active member of the self-organized Forum Queeres Archiv München.

== Career ==
In 2020 he received the Media Award of the German AIDS Foundation, and in 2021 he won the Dutch Royal Award for Painting.

He had the solo exhibitions "Gauweilereien" at Schwules Museum, Berlin in 2014, "Setz dein Ich in Anführungsstriche" at Kunstverein Göttingen in 2016, "Autoerotism" at Kevin Space, Vienna in 2021 and "Dis/Identification"at Kunsthalle Mainz in 2024 among others. Group exhibitions include: "Favoriten III" at Lenbachhaus, Munich in 2016; "Love and Ethnology" at Haus der Kulturen der Welt, Berlin in 2019; "Other histories told by Dirkje Kuik and Philipp Gufler" at Centraal Museum, Utrecht in 2020 and "Sweat" at Haus der Kunst, Munich in 2021. He showed his short films at the film festivals International Short Film Festival Oberhausen, Germany and Cheries Cherie, Paris, France among others. Currently his works are represented by the galleries BQ in Berlin and Françoise Heitsch in Munich.

He co-curated the exhibitions "Eccentric 80s: Tabea Blumenschein, Hilka Nordhausen, Rabe perplexum and Contemporary Accomplices" at Lothringer 13, Munich, Kunsthaus Hamburg and Galerie Nord | Kunstverein Tiergarten, Berlin and organized the exhibition "Substitutes" at W139 in Amsterdam and "Urning and Urningin. Language and Desire since 1864" on the legacy of Karl Heinrich Ulrichs at Nest in The Hague.

== Works ==
Philipp Gufler "explores matters of queer imagery, questioning the Western historiography, in which heterosexuality and a binary gender system define the social norm". He spans various media in his practice, including silkscreen prints on fabric and mirrors, artist books, performances and video installations. His artist book and video installation Projection on the Crisis (Gauweilereein in Munich "takes a kaleidoscopic and retrospective look at the early days of the AIDS crisis in Germany". In the ongoing series of quilts, Philipp Gufler refers to artists, writers, magazines and lost queer spaces. The screen-printed fabrics have been exhibited at the Württembergischer Kunstverein, Stuttgart and at Munich Documentation Centre for the History of National Socialism among other venues. In 2020, he produced a short film and a zine about the singer and entertainer Lana Kaiser. As a founding member of the Paul Hoecker Research Group, Philipp Gufler exhibited works inspired by Hoecker in the 2026 exhibition "Imitations of Paul" at Galerie BQ in Berlin.

== Publications ==
- Afschar, Yasmin (2024). Philipp Gufler. Dis/Identification. Berlin: Distanz Verlag, 176 pages.
- Gruhne, Stefan; Gufler, Philipp; Maniu, Nicholas; Spachtholz, Christina (ed.) (2026), Splitter 19: Traces of Paul, Munich / Berlin: Forum Queeres Archiv München and BQ, 112 pages
- Gufler, Philipp (2017). Splitter 14: I Wanna Give You Devotion. Munich: Forum Queeres Archiv München and Hammann von Mier Verlag, 112 pages.
- Gufler, Philipp (2017): Indirect Contact. Berlin: BQ Berlin, 40 pages.
- Gufler, Philipp (2020): Quilt #01–#30. Munich: Hammann von Mier Verlag, 208 pages.
- Gufler, Philipp (2020): Lana Kaiser. Munich: Hammann von Mier Verlag, 26 pages.
- Gufler, Philipp (2021): Projection on the Crisis. Gauweilereien in Munich. Munich: Forum Queeres Archiv München und Hammann von Mier Verlag, 152 pages.
- Gufler, Philipp in collaboration with Ergül Cengiz, Burcu Dogramaci, Angela Stiegler, and Mareike Schwarz (2022): Eccentric 80s: Tabea Blumenschein, Hilka Nordhausen, Rabe perplexum and Contemporary Accomplices. Berlin: b_books, Berlin 2022, 372 pages.
- Gufler, Philipp in collaboration with Jan Erbelding, Leo Heinik, and Maria VMier (2023): Cosy bei Cosy. Munich: Hammann von Mier Verlag, 72 pages.
- Gufler, Philipp (2023): A Shrine To Aphrodite. Munich: Hammann von Mier Verlag, 78 pages.
