= De Plattfööt =

De Plattfööt, (German pronunciation: [deː platfœt]) are a folk music duo from the German State of Mecklenburg-Western Pomerania composed of singer-songwriters and guitar players Peter Wilke and Klaus Lass. They were founded in 1979,

Their musical style is a mix of folk music, blues and country and western, and they sing most of their humorous songs in Low German. Their most famous hits are "Disco up'n Dörp", "Fru Püttelkow ut Hagenow", and "De Isenbahnboomupundaldreier" ("The railway crossing-barrier-up-and-down-turner").

De Plattfööt means The Flatfeet in Low German. They hold true to their motto: "Kort is dien Leben un lang’ büst du dod. Minsch, blot nich argern, ne, lachen deit good!" ("Short is your life and long you are dead. Man, do not worry, no, laughing is good!"), Rudolf Tarnow.

== Discography ==
- 1981: Disco up'n Dörp (Single)
- 1982: Platt for ju (Album)
- 1983: Remmi Demmi (Single)
- 1985: Songs ut Meckelbörg' (Album)
- 1989: Wenn du ok Plattfööt hest (Album)
- 1991: God'n Dag ok (Album)
- 1992: Hubertusjagd (Single)
- 1993: Wat is denn dat?? (Album)
- 1995: Evergreens des Nordens (Album)
- 1997: Rolf mit'n Golf (Single)
- 1998: Wat is dat Schönst' an Wihnachten (Album)
- 1999: Ierst mal ganz langsam (Album)
- 1999: Nie wieder Mallorca! (Single)
- 2000: 20 Best of Plattfööt (Album)
- 2005: Kofferradio (Album)
- 2008: Ümmer noch eenmol (Album)
