= Ernst Ewald =

German painter (1836–1904)

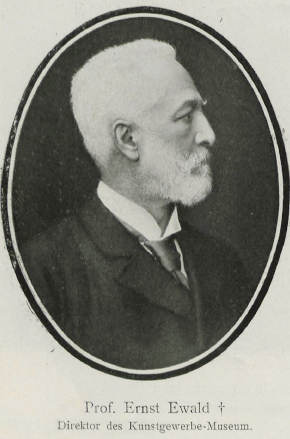
Ernst Ewald from the Berliner Leben (1905)

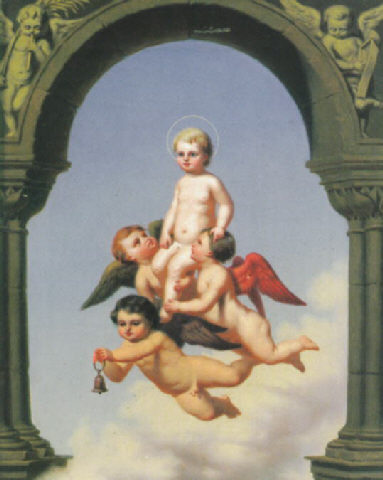
Under an Archway the Infant Jesus is Carried by Winged Angels, one of his few free-standing oil paintings

Ernst Deodat Paul-Ferdinand Ewald (17 March 1836 – 30 December 1904) was a German painter.

== Life ==
He was born in Berlin to a banking family and attended the University of Bonn, where he studied medicine and the natural sciences. He later became a pupil of Carl Steffeck. From 1856 to 1863, he lived in Paris, where he was a student of Thomas Couture. He travelled to Italy in 1864 and devoted himself to studying Fifteenth Century art.

He settled in Berlin in 1865. Beginning in 1868, he was an instructor in the school at the Kunstgewerbemuseum Berlin, which he had helped to create. He became the museum's Director in 1874. Following the death of Martin Gropius in 1880, he also took over management of the Royal School of Art in Berlin.

Among his works from this period are paintings in the library of the Berlin Town Hall, scenes from the Nibelungenleid in the Querhalle (Cross Hall) of the National Gallery and windows in the Martin-Gropius-Bau. In 1871, he designed the interiors for the reconstruction of the Cochem Imperial Castle and, from 1888 to 1890, did mosaic designs for the Kaiser Friedrich Mausoleum in Potsdam. Ewald had worked as an artistic advisor for Friedrich when he was Crown Prince and gave drawing lessons to his sons, Prince Wilhelm (who would become Emperor Wilhelm II) and Prince Henry.

Ewald's work was based on classical models and a desire to preserve historical forms and techniques.

He died in Berlin in 1904.

== Writings ==
- Farbige Illustrationen alter und neuer Zeit. Farbige Dekorationen vom 15.-19. Jahrhundert. Four volumes; Berlin: Wasmuth 1889 - 1896.
