= Dora Koch-Stetter =

German painter (1881–1968)

- Born: Dora Koch; 4 May 1881; Bayreuth, Germany
- Died: 16 January 1968 (aged 86); Ahrenshoop, East Germany
- Occupation(s): landscape artist, portrait-painter and etcher
- Spouse: Fritz Koch-Gotha
- Children: Barbara Klünder-Koch

Dora Koch-Stetter (4 May 1881 – 16 January 1968) was a German landscape artist, portrait-painter and etcher.

== Life ==
Dora Stetter already came into contact with art as a child. After the death of her husband and the retreat to Berlin in 1884, her mother led a drawing school there. Her own artistic career began in 1899–1901 with her studies as a drawing teacher at the Royal School of Art in Berlin. This study secured her life support between 1902 and 1917 as a teacher for private pupils in her own studio in Berlin. In order to develop his own skills towards a free-lancing painter, in 1901/02 followed courses in painting and drawing with de:Conrad Fehr at the art-school, connected to the Kunstgewerbemuseum Berlin, and 1902 painting studies with Johannes Heise. In 1903/04 she was a pupil in the Berlin studio of Lovis Corinth. From 1910 she was working with the Romanian Impressionist painter Arthur Segal. From 1911 she was a member of the Verein der Berliner Künstlerinnen ( Society of Berlin women artists). She traveled to Bavaria, Belgium, Denmark and Pomerania between 1902 and 1913. In 1911 Dora Stetter came to Ahrenshoop on the Baltic Sea for the first time.

"In 1917 Dora Stetter married the artist Fritz Koch-Gotha (1877–1956), gave up her profession as a drawing teacher and took on her role as mother and housewife. To reconcile both – artists and middle-class housewives – was almost impossible at a time when women as artists in general were neither particularly encouraged by their men nor the public."

In 1919, her only child, Barbara, was born. The artists' couple Koch [-Gotha and Stetter] came to Fischland every year from 1922, initially as guests of the painter Franz Triebsch. In 1927 the family bought a house in Althagen near Ahrenshoop. Since then, Dora Koch-Stetter has also devoted herself to her own work. After the Berlin studio as well as their apartment and a large part of their works were destroyed in 1944, Althagen became permanent residence. From the 1950s onwards Dora Koch-Stetter was again busy with painting. After the death of Fritz Koch-Gotha in 1956, she devoted herself first to preserving the work of her deceased husband. Through a stroke in 1961 paralyzed on the right side and bedridden, she slowly began to draw and paint again. The diminution of the forces led to the task of painting. Dora Koch-Stetter died on 16 January 1968 in her house in Althagen, today a district of Ahrenshoop.

"I believe that this Dora Koch-Stetter is the true pearl among the painters who have ever worked in Ahrenshoop, long hidden, not many known today, but of lasting brilliancy."

== Works (selection) ==
- Selbstporträt (Self-portrait) (1903)
- Dame im Sessel (Lady in the armchair) (1906)
- Mädchen mit Puppe (Girl with doll) (1907)
- Rotes Haus in Althagen (Red house in Althagen) (1911)
- Gartenweg in Althagen (Garden path in Althagen) (1911)
- Polnische Schnitterin (Polish reaper) (1913)
- Belgische Landschaft (Belgian landscape) (1913)
- Brüggekanal (Bruges canal) (1913)
- Am Strand von Knoke (On the beach of Knoke) (1913)
- Haus Dross in Ahrenshoop (House Dross in Ahrenshoop) (1924/25) The sommer house of Friedrich and Liselotte Dross.
- Fritz Koch-Gotha () (1950)

== See also ==
- List of German women artists
