= Kirsten Nilsson =

German cabaret performer (1931–2017)

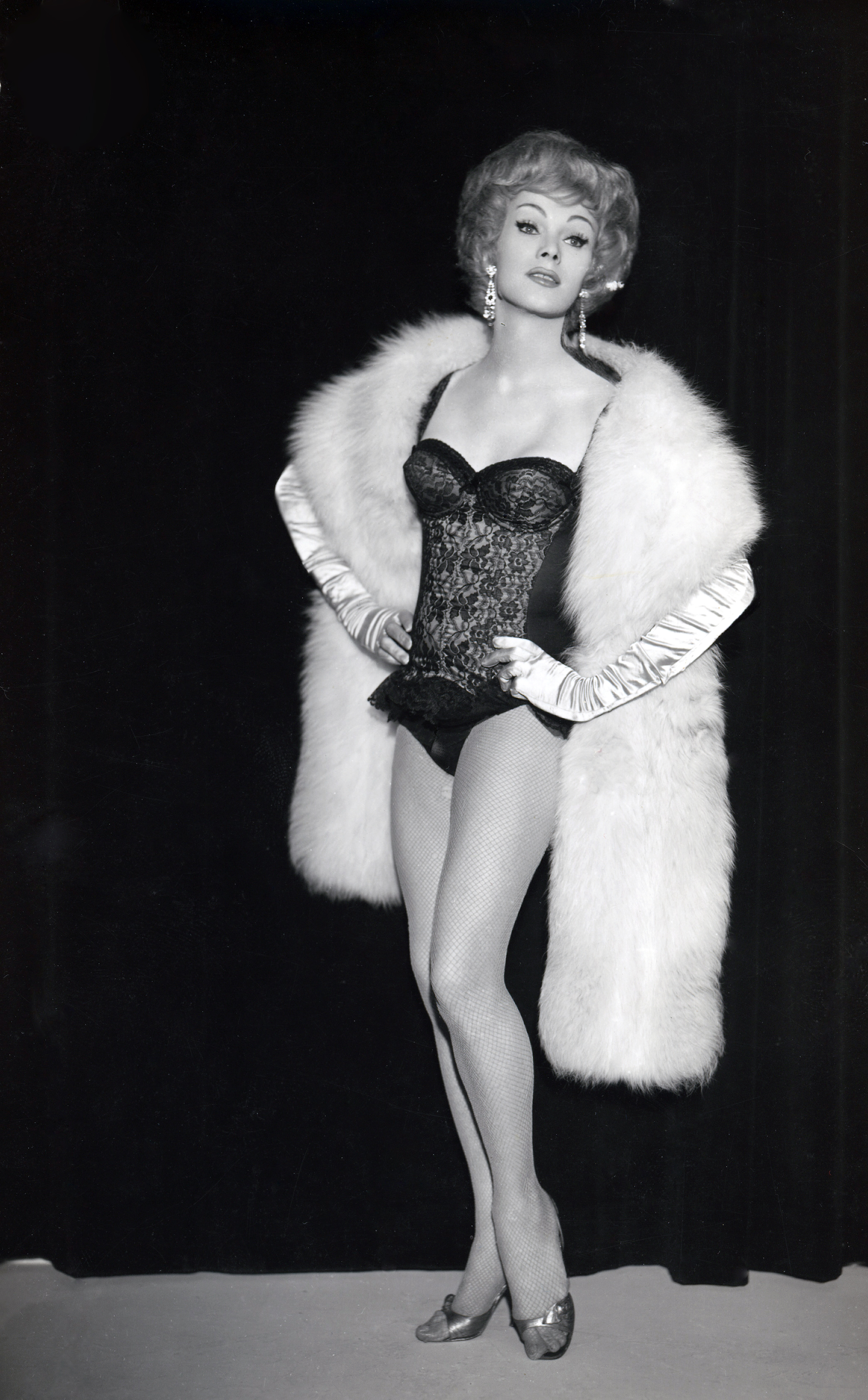
- Nilsson c. 1968
- Born: Karl Erick Böttcher; 25 March 1931; Voigtsdorf, Germany
- Died: 12 July 2017 (aged 86); Munich, Germany
- Occupations: cabaret performer dancer drag artist sex worker nurse

Kirsten Nilsson (25 March 1931 – 12 July 2017) was a German cabaret performer and sex worker. She was one of the first German transgender women to undergo sexual reassignment surgery in Casablanca. Her memoirs, titled From Hitler Youth to Dominatrix. A Transsexual Life in the 20th Century, were published in 2017 by the Forum Queeres Archiv München.

== Biography ==
Nilsson was born on 25 March 1931 in Voigtsdorf, Mecklenburg-Strelitz. She lived in Küstrin with her family, but they fled from the Soviets in 1945 and settled in Upper Bavaria. While living in Bavaria, Nilsson trained as a ladies' hairdresser in Rosenheim and as a costume designer in Munich, as well as enrolling in acting and dance classes. She worked with circuses in Switzerland and the United Kingdom before performing in cabarets as a female impersonator, using the stage name Sylvia, in the 1950s.

In 1952, she came out as a transgender woman, following the media attention surrounding Christine Jorgensen. In 1964, she became one of the first people in Germany to undergo a gender reassignment surgery in Casablanca. In 1966, she legally changed her first name to Kirsten and her gender in Berlin-Schöneberg.

Nilsson performed as a dancer on the stages of erotic clubs in Hamburg's St. Pauli Quarter, including the Salambo. The writer Johannes Mario Simmel used her performances to inspire his novel The Stuff Dreams Are Made Of.

In the 1970s, Nilsson owned multiple strip clubs in northern Germany. She married twice, and was written about as a "sex star" in Bild. She worked as a sex worker in Switzerland until an illness ended her career in 1979. She then trained as a geriatric nurse and gave lectures on transgender healthcare.

Her memoirs were published under the title From Hitler Youth to Dominatrix. A Transsexual Life in the 20th Century in 2017 by the Forum Queeres Archiv München.
