= Johann Smidt =

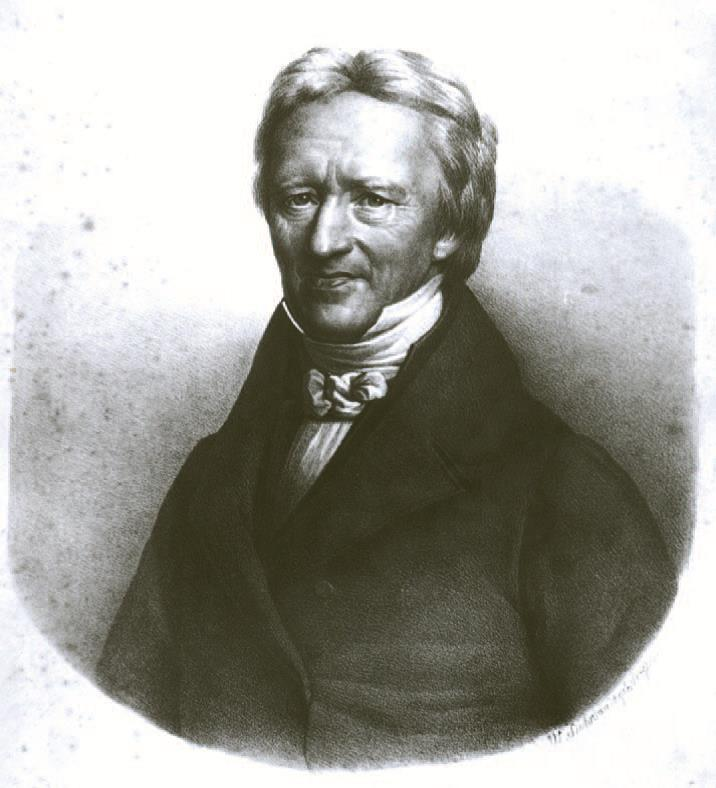
Portrait lithograph of Johann Smidt, by Wilhelmine Suhrlandt (1830)

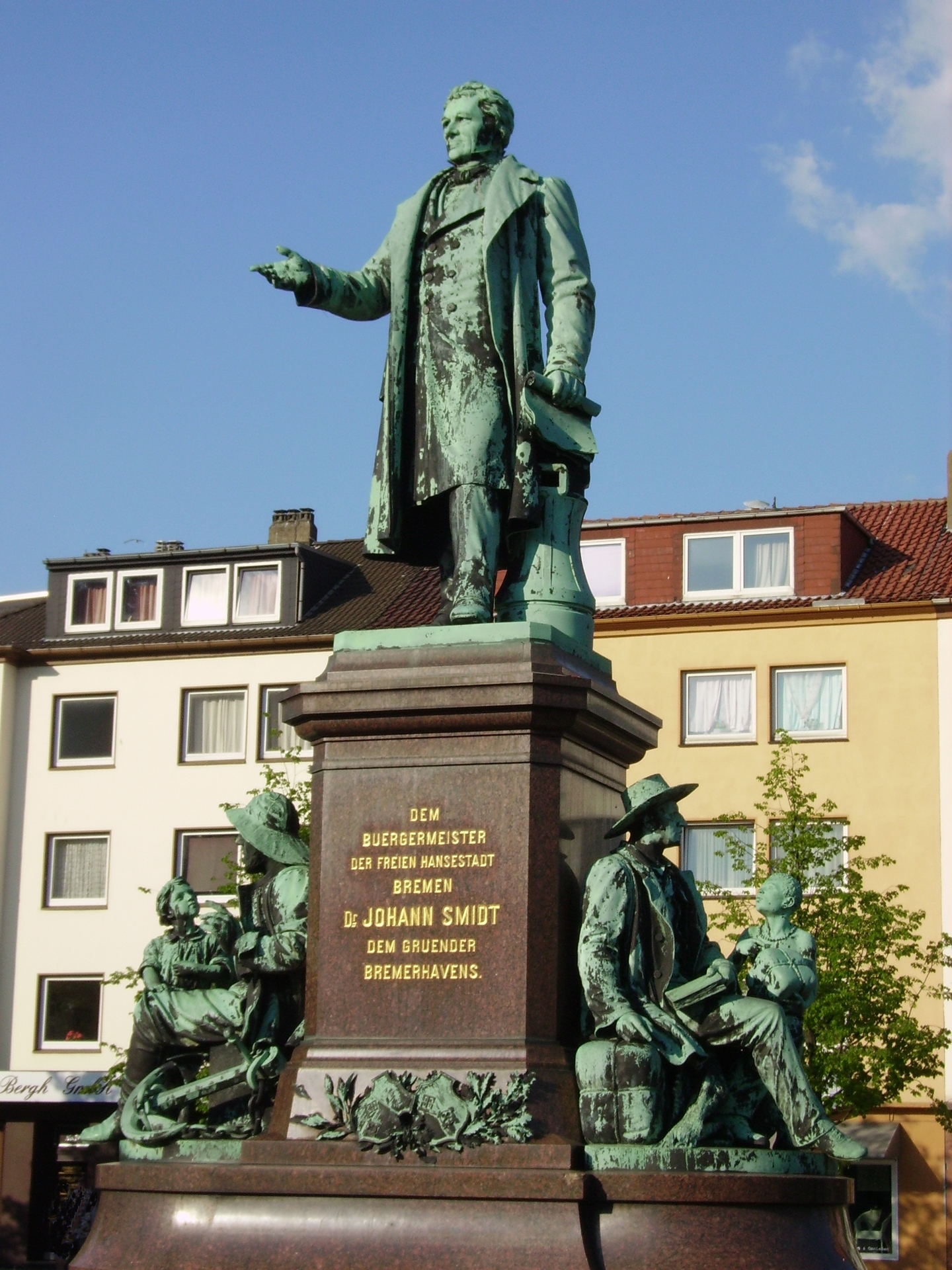
Memorial to Johann Smidt in Bremerhaven

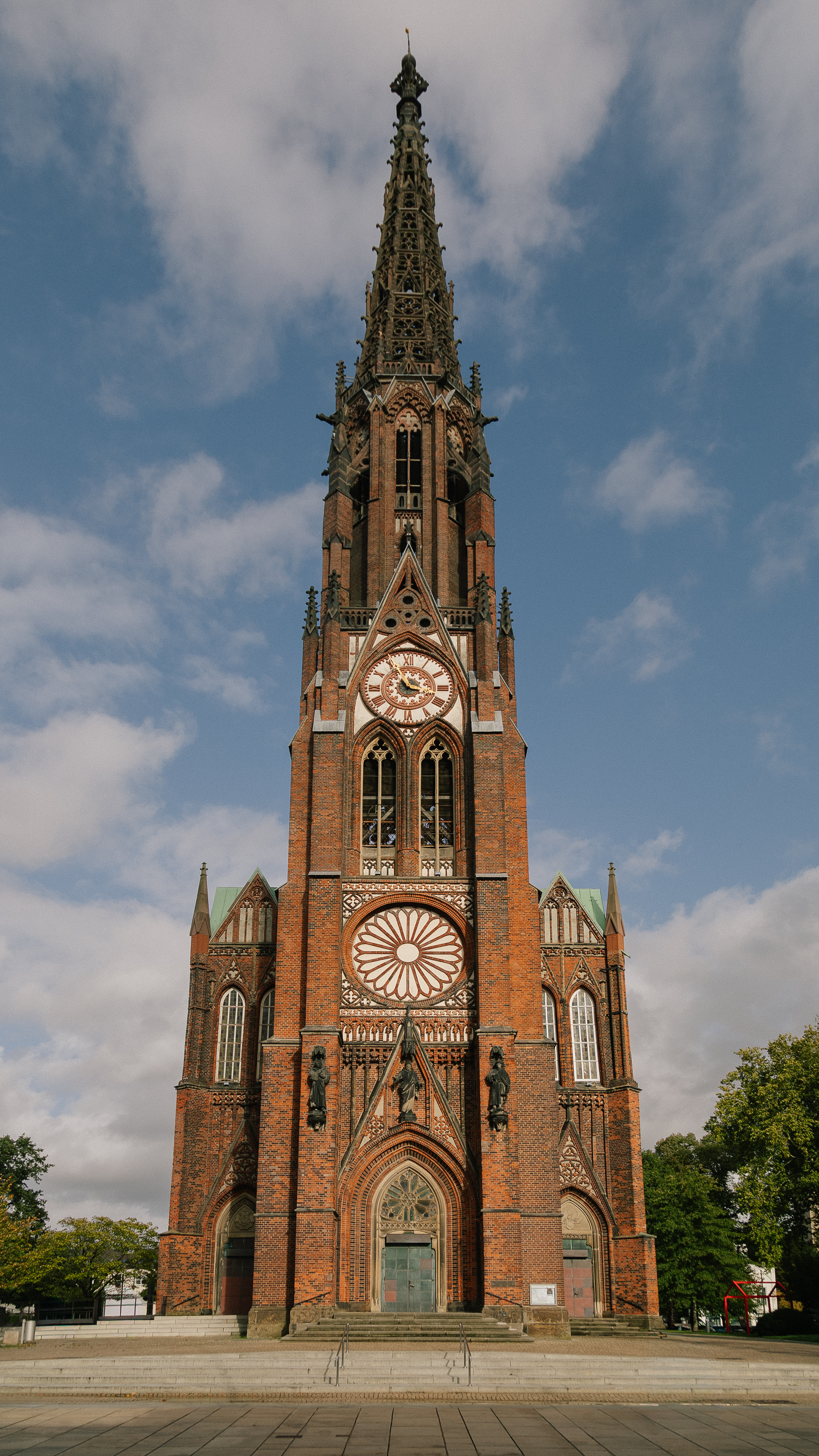
Bürgermeister-Smidt-Gedächtniskirche

Johann Smidt (November 5, 1773 – May 7, 1857) was an important Bremen politician, theologian, and founder of Bremerhaven.

== Biography ==
Smidt was a son of the Reformed preacher Johann Smidt sen., pastor at St. Stephen Church in Bremen. Smidt jun. studied theology in Jena, and was one of the founders of the Gesellschaft der freien Männer (Community of free men). He was ordained Reformed preacher in Zürich in 1797. He then became Professor of History at the Gymnasium Illustre in his hometown. He then became 'Syndikus' (company lawyer) for the Älterleute (aldermen, Bremen's merchants corporation of constitutional rank) and in 1800 'Ratsherr' (councilman), a position in which he exerted considerable influence on the governmental and commercial development of the cities of the Hanseatic League.

In particular as he acted as Bremen's diplomatic representative at the Congress of Vienna and preserved the independence of the Hanseatic cities and put through their acceptance into the German Confederation of sovereign states after the Battle of Leipzig in 1813. In the final revision of the decisions of the Congress on the rights of the Jews, Smidt - unauthorised and unconsented by the other parties - changed the text from "The confessors of Jewish faith are preserved the rights already conceded to them in the confederal states", by replacing the single word "in", which ensued serious consequences, into: "The confessors of Jewish faith are preserved the rights already conceded to them by the confederal states." In the Confederation's Bundesversammlung, he battled the politics of Klemens Wenzel Lothar von Metternich, and was particularly involved in the negotiations which in 1820 established free shipping on the Weser.

Above all, he gave Bremen's commerce an important impulse through the foundation of Bremerhaven in 1827 and by closing advantageous trade agreements with foreign countries, through widening of consular representation, etc. In 1821 he became Bürgermeister (mayor) of Bremen and he held this post — apart from the democratic period of 1849-1852 — until his death.

Smidt was a devout member of the Reformed church, then Bremen's state church, merged only in 1873 with Lutheran congregations to form today's Bremian Evangelical Church. He worked against tolerating other religions and denominations within the city. Inglorious was Smidt's anti-Judaism. As burgomaster, Smidt made the "complete expulsion of the children of Israel" an "urgent concern of the state" since 1821. Jews had settled within the city during its incorporation into the ephemeric Kingdom of Westphalia (1807-1810) and afterwards into France (1810-1813), when all inhabitants had become French citizens of equal status. All this ended in 1813/1815. Since it was the French state and not the Free Hanseatic City of Bremen, which had emancipated the Jews in Bremen, the city took the altered formulation of the Viennese decisions as the legal grounds to revoke - as did a number of confederal states - the emancipation of the Jews in its territory. In 1826, Smidt had met his goal with the exception of two 'Schutzjuden' taken over from neighbouring Hanover.

Also Bremen's Lutheran congregation, owning and using the Bremen Cathedral, experienced Smidt's steady badgering. The cathedral district, a former immunity district, used to be an extraterritorial enclave of the neighboured state of Bremen-Verden until 1803, when it was incorporated into the Free Imperial City of Bremen. As burgomaster Smidt confiscated the considerable estates of the Lutheran congregation, arguing it would be a legal non-thing, null and void. The representatives of the Lutheran congregation, led by the cathedral preacher Johann David Nicolai, started to fight for its right to exist. The fight lasted until the congregation's official recognition in 1830, asserted by a majority of Bremen's senators (government members) against the expressed will of Smidt. Smidt abused his governmental power to suppress the Lutheran congregation by way of ordinances, confiscation and public discreditation.

Smidt dedicated himself to close cooperation between the Hanseatic cities. In 'Anerkennung der Hilfe nach dem großen Hamburger Brand' (acknowledgement after the great Hamburg fire) in 1843, he was named an honorary citizen of Hamburg.

Smidt's son Heinrich Smidt (1806–1878), a studied lawyer, also served Bremen as senator and archivist.

== Honors ==
- Bürgermeister-Smidt-Brücke (Mayor Smidt Bridge), oldest bridge over the River Weser in Bremen
- Bürgermeister-Smidt-Straße (Mayor Smidt Street)
- Bürgermeister-Smidt-Gedächtniskirche (Mayor Smidt Church) in Bremerhaven
