= Fritz Greve =

German painter

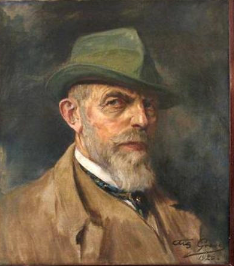
Self-portrait

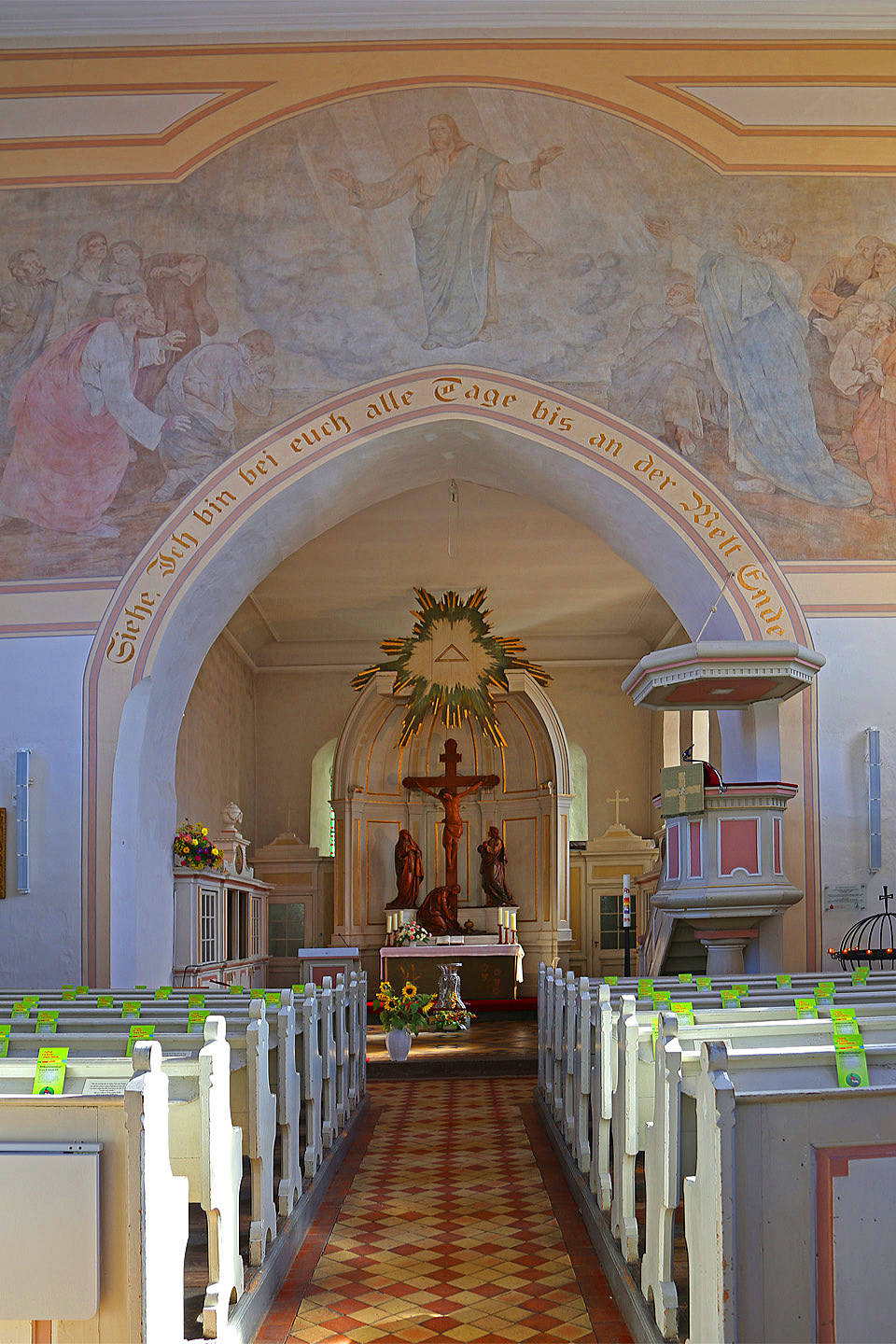
The restored arch in the Marienkirche

Friedrich Heinrich Ludwig Greve, known as Fritz (17 August 1863, Malchin - 2 April 1931, Malchin) was a German painter and art professor.

== Biography ==
He received his first art lessons from his father, Wilhelm, who worked as a decorative painter for the court. After completing his basic education and military service, where he advanced to the rank of sergeant, he left home to begin his formal studies at the Kunstgewerbeschule Dresden. Later he attended the Kunstgewerbeschule in Frankfurt and the Berlin University of the Arts. His primary instructor there was Max Koner.

From 1902 until 1928, he was a professor at the Royal School of Art. In 1903, he married Theodora Mozer (1871–1947), the daughter of Dr. Alexander Karl Wilhelm Mozer (1841–1910), a member of the Medical Council. They had no children. During this time, he painted portraits, still-lifes, landscapes, altarpieces and frescoes. Most of his paintings are in private collections. Many, it is said, were bartered to supplement his teaching income. He was, however, able to begin building a summer residence near Malchin in 1909.

In 1913, he completed a mural on the triumphal arch at the Marienkirche in Waren an der Müritz. However, due to theological concerns, the mural was painted over during renovations in 1963. His original study for the mural was found, by accident, during work on his home in 2000. Upon review, the congregation voted to restore the mural. It was unveiled in 2013, on the 100th anniversary of its creation.

In the 1920s, Greve became known as the "Gray Eminence" of Mecklenburg painters. In addition to his participation in numerous exhibitions, he was in charge of the Große Berliner Kunstausstellung when it returned to Berlin after World War I. He also worked as an illustrator for books of heroic German sagas and folk tales of Mecklenburg. A notable example is Gretenwäschen. Preisgekrönte Erzählungen aus dem mecklenburgischen Volksleben., edited by Karl Beyer, from 1919.

In 1928, he retired from his position at the Royal School and returned to Malchin, where he opened a private painting school. He died of a lung disorder in 1931. Theodora survived him by sixteen years. In 2006, the gymnasium there was named after him. His former home has become a venue for concerts, lectures and art exhibitions.
