= Margarete Scheel =

German artist

Margarete Scheel (28 September 1881 – 9 November 1969) was a German artist, specializing in sculpture and ceramics.

Scheel was born in Rostock to a family involved professionally in medicine. She, however, took a different path, pursuing her secondary education at an all-girls, private institution before traveling to Berlin to study art at the Museum of Decorative Arts Berlin and the Reimann School. When war broke out, she continued her education in Paris. After school she moved between Belgium, the Netherlands and Berlin, exhibiting at the Free Secession and publishing in German art magazines. Following her time in Northern Europe, she took her budding sculptural practice southward to Rome in 1914, working in private studios and participating in the Werkbund Exhibition. She transitioned into pottery, even opening her own pottery workshop in Rostock. Soon after she began working for the Berlin Art Council and held a position in the Association of Rockstock Artists, working closely with sculptor Hertha Von Guttenburg. Their projects together led to new commissions in buildings like the New Vocational School. Many of her works were destroyed during bomb raids in the modest studio she kept during the National Socialist era, and most of the surviving pieces can be found in her hometown, as public art and in the Rostock Museum.

== Gallery ==
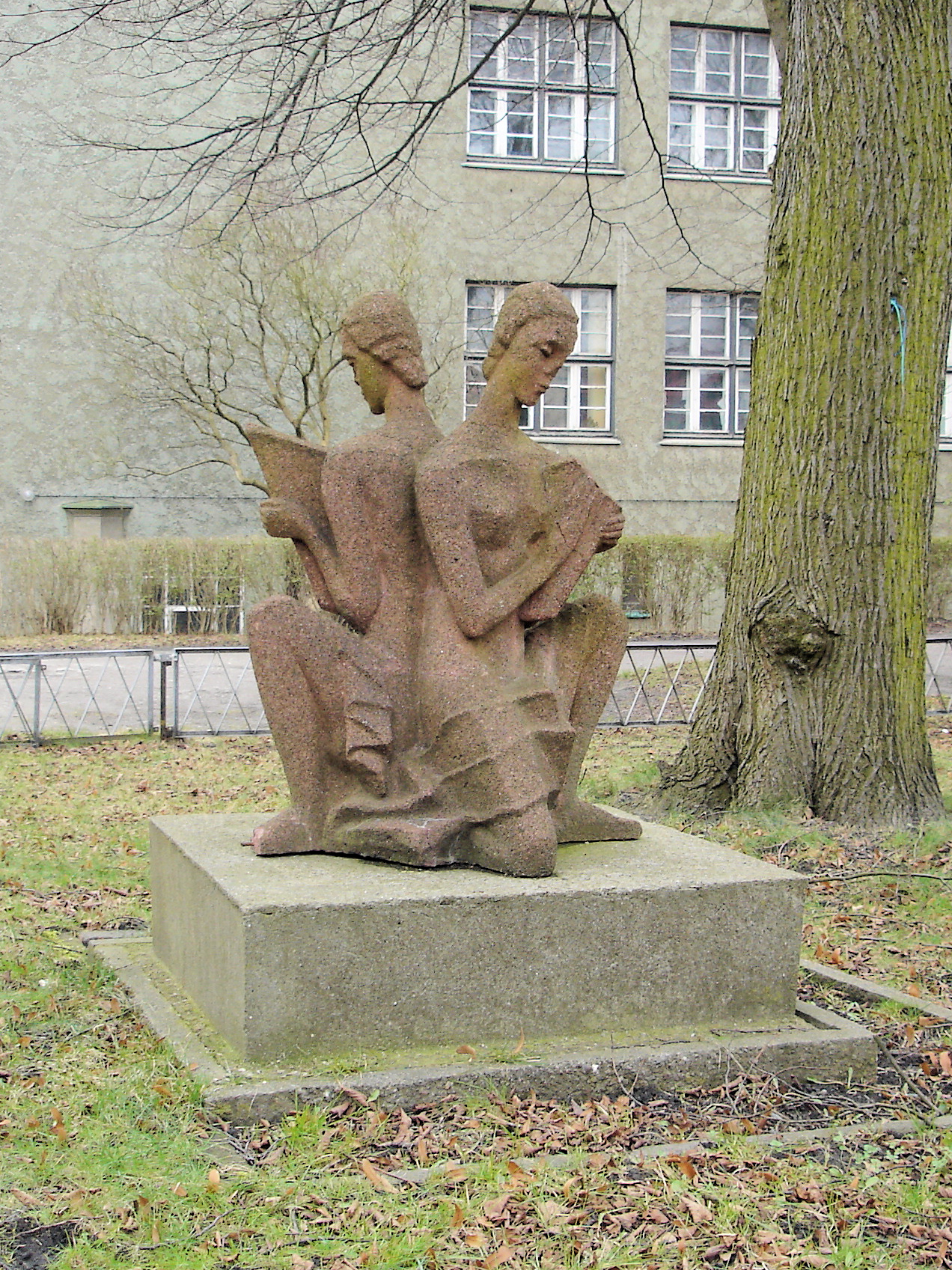
Erholung (Recovery)

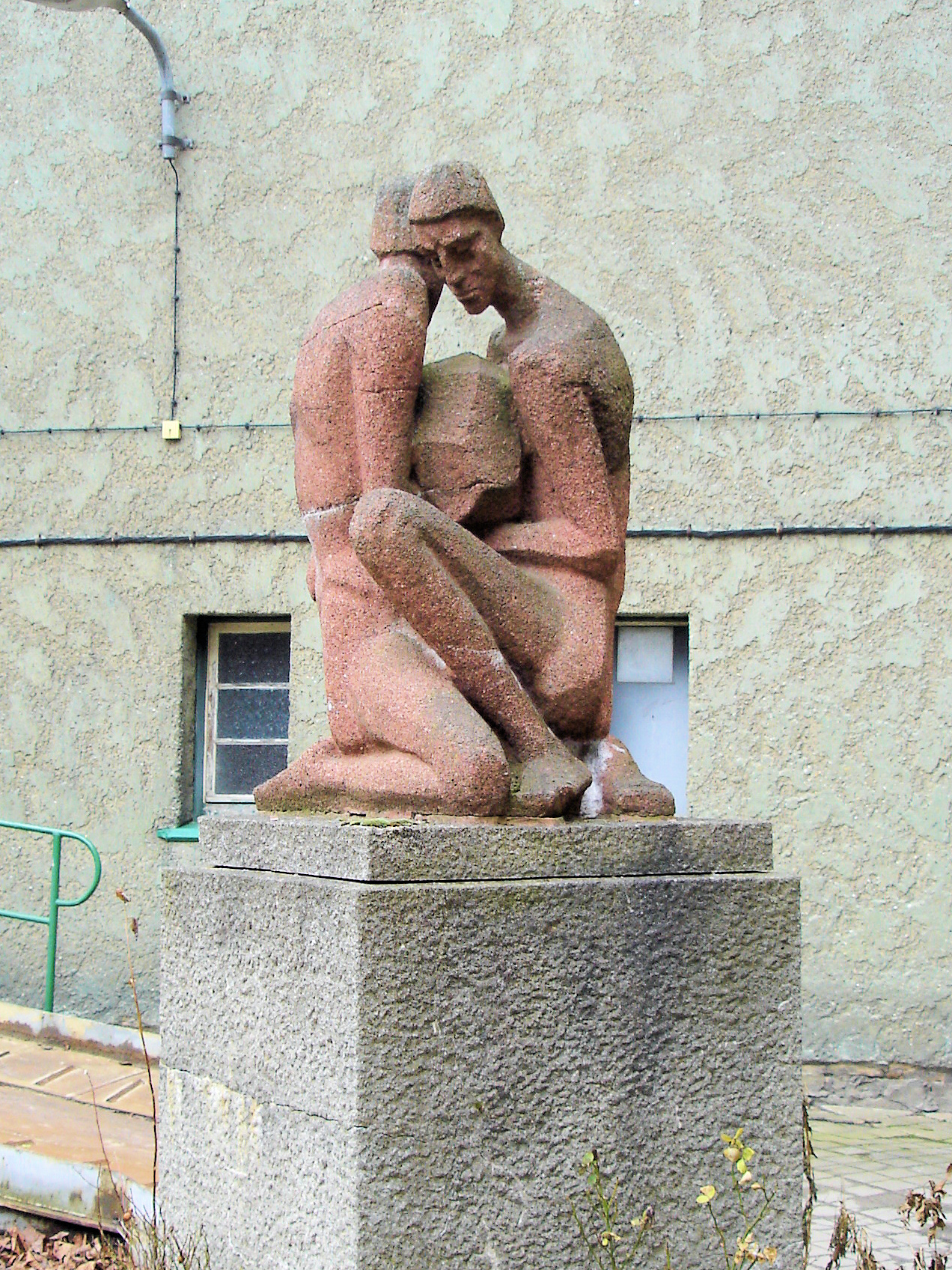
Arbeit (Work)

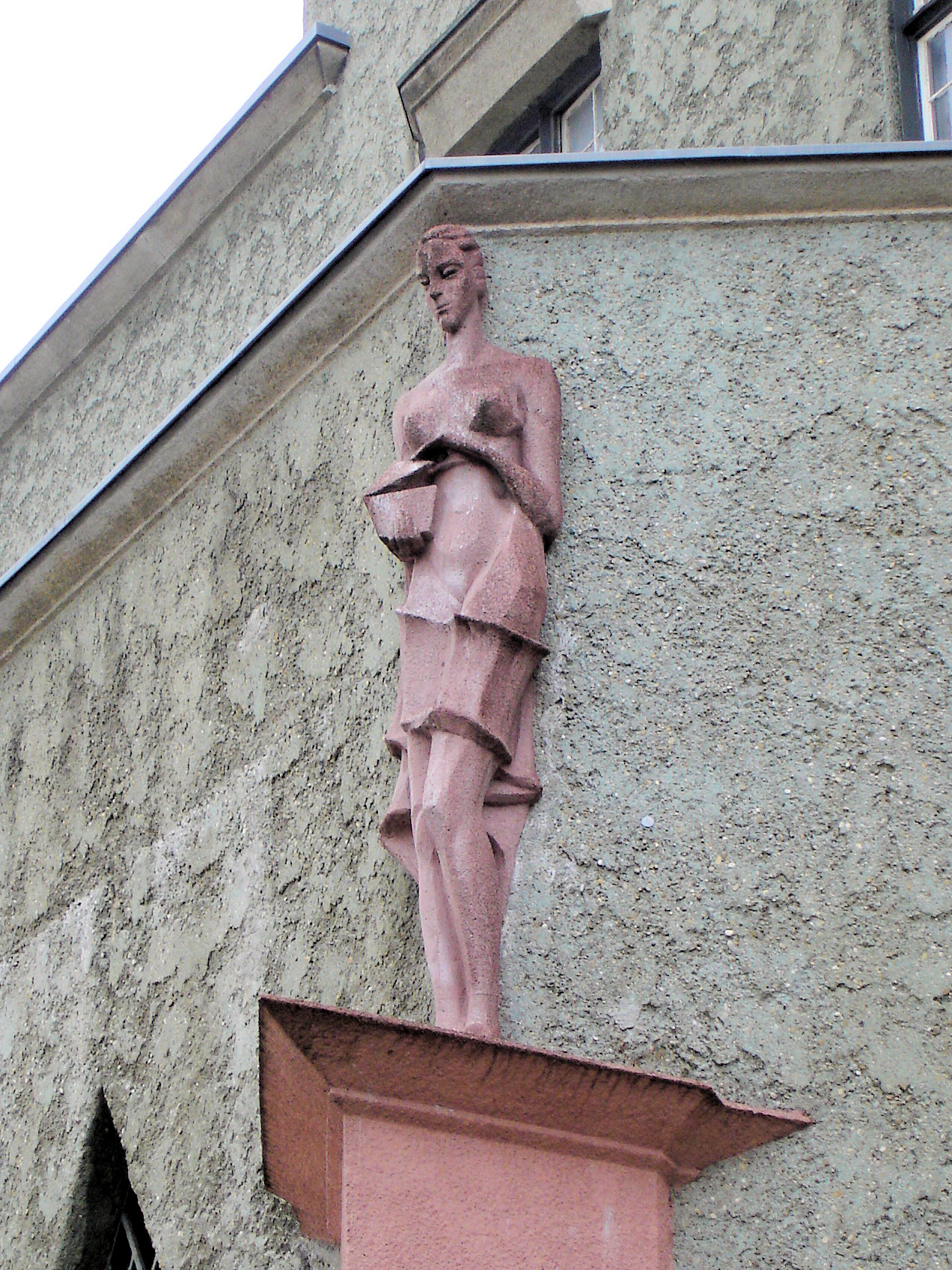
Holz (Wood)

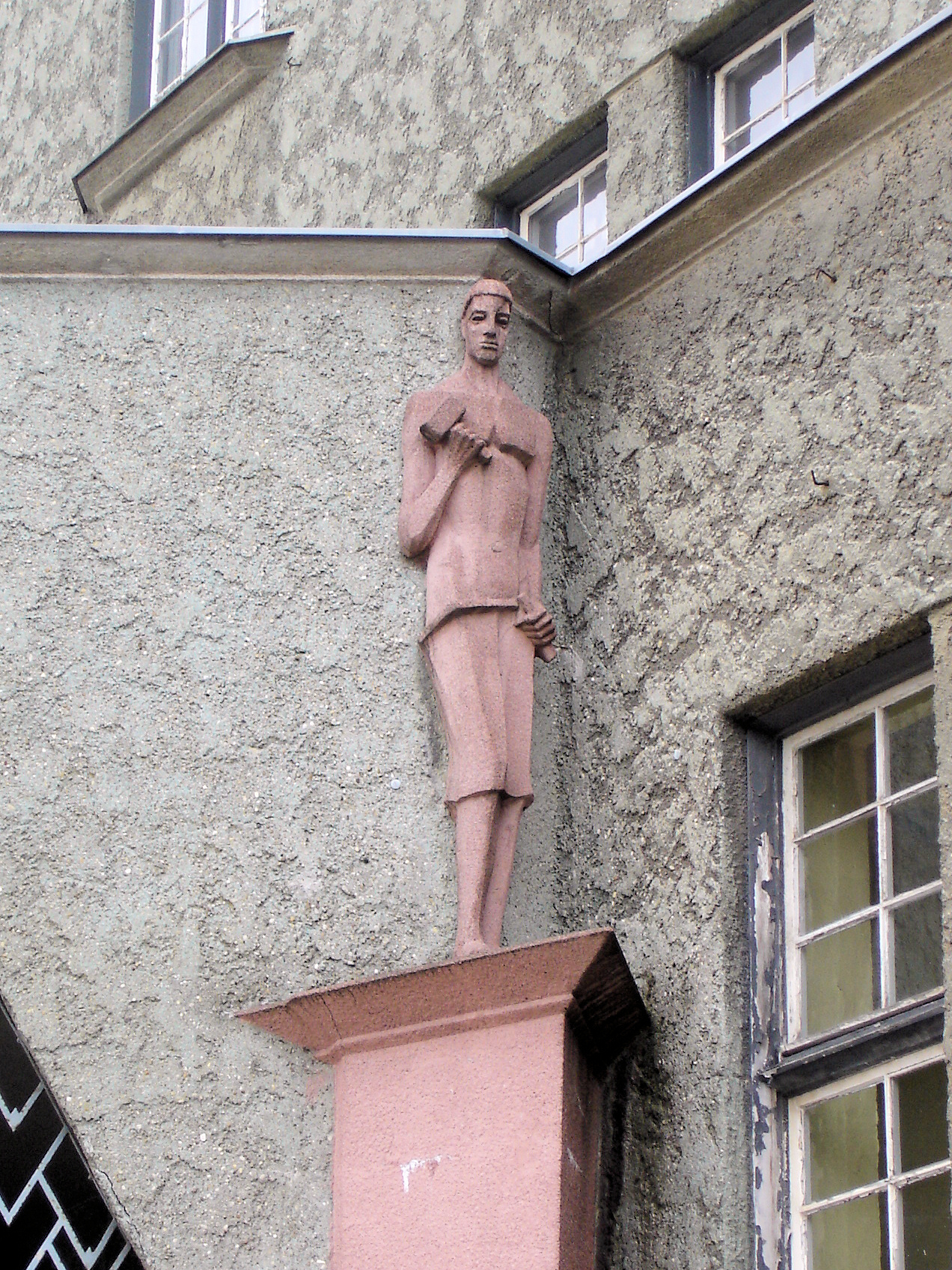
Stein (Stone)

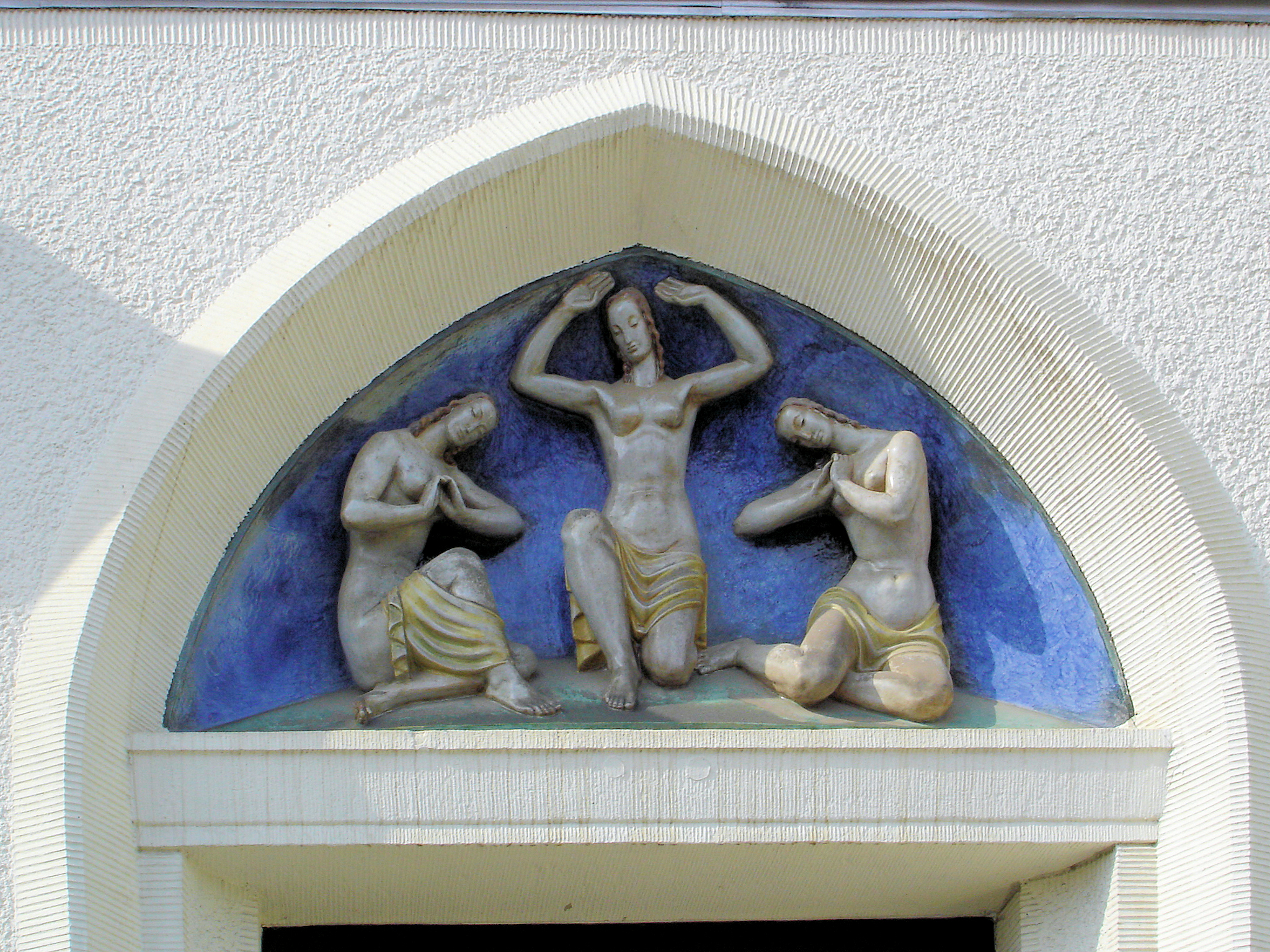
Tympanum, Blücherstraße, Rostock
