= Wilhelm Titel =

German painter and academic drawing teacher

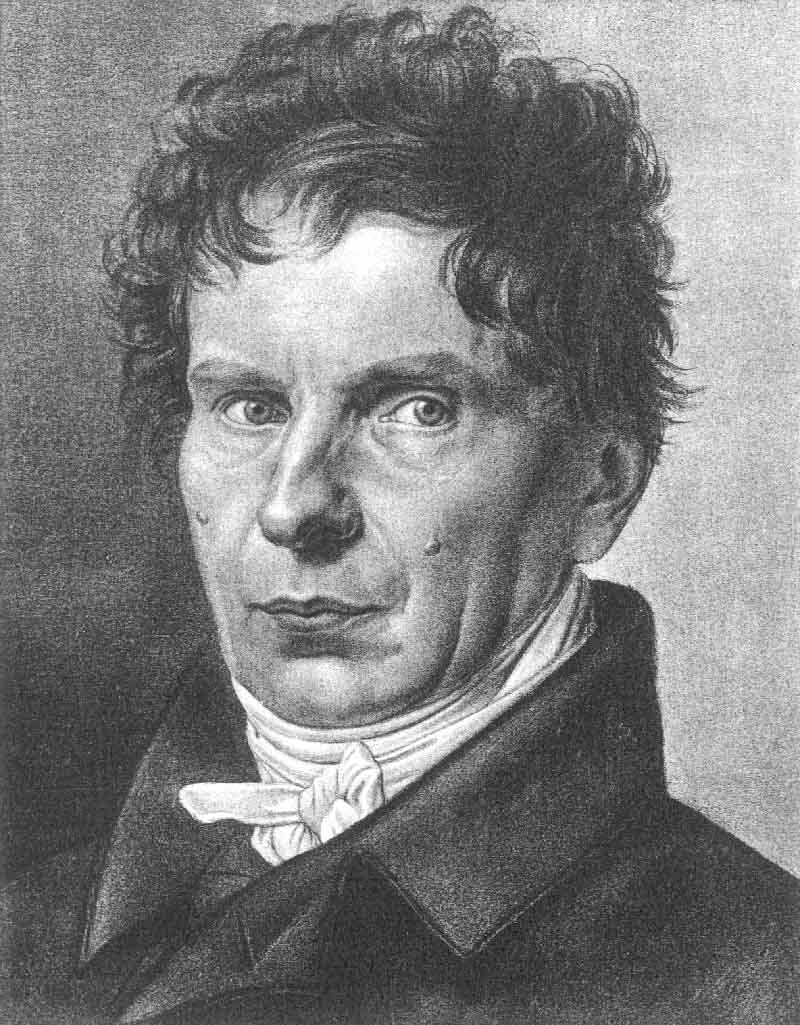
Wilhelm Titel

Wilhelm Titel (16 February 1784 – 2 March 1862) was a German painter and academic drawing teacher at the University of Greifswald.

== Life and career ==
Born was born in Boltenhagen. He began his theological studies at the University of Greifswald, which he soon abandoned in favor of painting. He received his education in 1801 at the Kunstakademie Dresden and from 1802 to 1806 at the Akademie der bildenden Künste Wien. Titel gave his study collection still to Vienna where he was influenced by the French painter René Théodore Berthon (1776-1859). From 1806 to 1819 he lived in Italy, mainly in Rome and Florence, where he lived with Jakob Philipp Hackert.

1819 he returned to Vorpommern after the death of his father and worked first in Stralsund as a portrait painter. In 1826 he became the successor of Johann Gottfried Quistorp University drawing teacher in the drawing room of the University of Greifswald, today's Caspar David Friedrich Institute. He made studies after old Italian masters and many characteristic portraits of university professors, which hang today again in the council hall of the University of Greifswald. He also painted northern German landscapes. In 1851 he was appointed professor.

During his lifetime, he donated his study collection to the University of Greifswald. A collection of 124 sheets is preserved there today.

Title died in Greifswald at the age of 78.
