= Elise Blumann =

Australian artist (1897–1990)

- Self portrait, 1937, oil on canvas, 52.5 x 62.5 cm, Cruthers Collection of Women's Art, The University of Western Australia
- Born: Elise Margot Paula Rudolphina Hulda Schlie; 16 January 1897; Parchim, Germany
- Died: 29 January 1990 (aged 93); Nedlands, Western Australia
- Known for: Painting
- Movement: Expressionism
- Spouse: Arnold Blumann

Elise Blumann (16 January 1897 Parchim, Germany – 29 January 1990, Nedlands, Western Australia) was a German born artist who achieved recognition as an Australian Expressionist painter.

Blumann studied at the Royal School of Art in Berlin between 1917 and 1919, whilst also maintaining friendships and associations with artists at the Academy of Arts. Notably, Blumann recounted sitting for a portrait for artist Max Liebermann and also described his teaching methods although no verifiable evidence is available to confirm Liebermann as her tutor. After this, Blumann taught in various schools in Germany from 1920 to 1923, when she married Arnold Blumann. She fled Nazi Germany with her husband in 1934, arriving at the port of Fremantle, Western Australia on the passenger liner Ormonde on 4 January 1938.

In the decade following her arrival in Western Australia, Blumann produced a significant body of painting, taking as her subject the Western Australian landscape, her family and her new circle of friends. These works investigate the unique light and colour of the Western Australian landscape in a style informed by her knowledge of German Expressionism. Among these were Summer Nude, 1939, which caused a scandal when exhibited in Western Australia in 1944 due to both its depiction of nudity and its bold, simple shapes and lines. With the then Curator of the Art Gallery of Western Australia, Robert Campbell, she helped found the Art Group, a discussion group through which she promoted modernist ideas and attitudes in art and art education.

In the 1950s Blumann became disillusioned with the possibilities of art in Western Australia and only painted sporadically. Her work first received national attention in the late 1970s some fifteen years before she died in 1990, aged 93. She has since been acknowledged as a significant contributor to Australian modernist painting, prefiguring the development of the similarly landscape-based modernism in Western Australia associated with painters Guy Grey-Smith and Howard Taylor.

== Works ==
- Self portrait (1937)
- On The Swan, Crawley (1938)
- Summer Nude (1939)
- Portrait of Keith George (1941)
- On the Swan, Nedlands (1942)
- Spring in Life (1943)
- Surf (1939-1946)
- Storm on the Swan (1946)
- Rottnest Lighthouse and Salt Lake (1947)
- Family Group
- Dream (1970)
- Dreaming Nude (1970)
- Three Boys (1976)

== Exhibitions ==
- Western Australian Art and Artists 1900-1950, Art Gallery of Western Australia exhibition, 1987.
- The Europeans: Emigre Artists in Australia 1930-1960, National Gallery of Australia exhibition, 15 March 1997 to 9 June 1997.
- Elise Blumann: An Emigre Artist in Western Australia, University of Western Australia's Lawrence Wilson Art Gallery exhibition, 11 July 2015 to 19 September 2015.
- Dangerously Modern: Australian Women Artists in Europe 1890-1940, Art Gallery of South Australia exhibition, 24 May 2025 to 7 September 2025.
- Elise Blumann: Music in Motion. Art Gallery of Western Australia exhibition, 28 June 2025 to 30 November 2025.
