= Leopold August Abel =

German violinist and composer

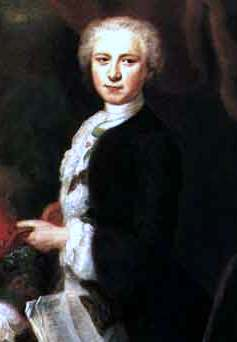
- Born: 24 March 1718; Köthen, Anhalt-Köthen, Germany
- Died: 25 August 1794 (aged 76); Ludwigslust, Germany
- Occupations: Violinist, composer

Leopold August Abel (24 March 1718 – 25 August 1794) was a German violinist and composer. He was born in Köthen in 1718. He was the elder brother of Karl Friedrich Abel, and the grandfather of Johann Leopold Abel. August Abel studied violin under Benda. He played in the orchestra of the theatre at Brunswick, and was successively conductor of the court band to the Prince of Schwarzburg-Sondershausen (1758), the Margrave of Schwedt (1766), and the Duke of Schwerin (1770). He composed a sinfonia a 8 voci in 1766, and some of his violin studies and other compositions are in the possession of the Gesellschaft der Musikfreunde at Vienna. However, he never rose to the reputation of his brother. He died at Ludwigslust on 25 August 1794.
