= Barbara Klünder =

- Born: September 28, 1919; Berlin, Free State of Prussia, Weimar Republic
- Died: April 8, 1988 (aged 68); Althagen, Ahrenshoop, Bezirk Rostock, East Germany
- Occupation(s): Ceramist, painter
- Known for: Fischlandkeramik
- Spouse: Arnold Klünder
- Children: Susanne Schwandt; Johann Klünder

Barbara Klünder (néé Barbara Koch, 28 September 1919 – 8 April 1988) was an East German ceramist and painter. She is known for the development of the regional Fischlandkeramik.

== Biography ==
Klünder was born Barbara Koch on 28 September 1919 in Berlin to Fritz Koch-Gotha and Dora Koch-Stetter, both artists. She grew up in Berlin and Althagen, the latter being known as an 'artists' colony'. She aimed to become an archaeologist and started an apprenticeship as a stenographer at AEG, her plans were however discarded with the start of World War II. In Berlin, she met her future husband, painter and ceramist Arnold Klünder, whom she married in 1943. During the war, the family's residence in Berlin was destroyed, forcing them to move to their Althagen summer home permanently. Barbara and Arnold Klünder had a daughter named Susanne Schwandt (néé Klünder) as well as a son named Johann Klünder.

Klünder and her husband were self-taught in ceramics. In 1956, they developed the Fischlandkeramik, a hallmark of the region nowadays.

She died on 8 April 1988 in Althagen and is buried in the Friedhof Wustrow cemetery.
