= Franziska Ellmenreich =

German actress

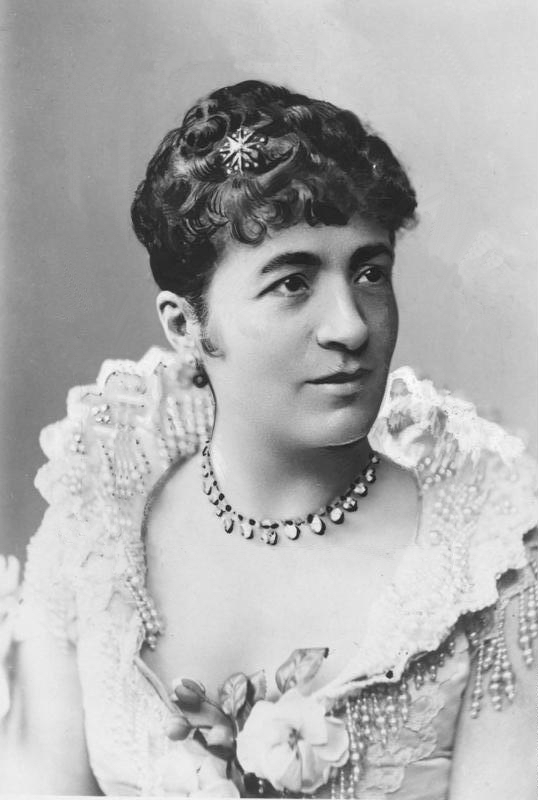
Franziska Ellmenreich in 1870

Franziska Ellmenreich (28 January 1847 in Schwerin – 20 October 1931 in Herrsching am Ammersee) was a German stage actress. Ellmenreich is regarded as the last heroine of the German theater.

== Family background ==
Ellmenreich was born into a family that excelled in the arts. Her great-grandfather was a Christian singer Brandl (died 1795). Her grandfather was the actor Johann Baptist Ellmenreich (1770–1816), her grandmother, the actress Friederike Ellmenreich and her father was a singer, composer and theater director, Albert Ellmenreich (1816–1905).

She married the playwright Richard Freiherr von Fuchs Nordhoff (1855–1897), with whom she gave birth to Felix Freiherr von Fuchs-Nordhoff (1881–1945), who became a painter. Their daughter also grew up to be a painter, Irene Marie Lührsen (1883–1968). Her grandson would also become a painter and stage designer Florence Freiherr von Fuchs Nordhoff (born 1914).

== Life and career ==
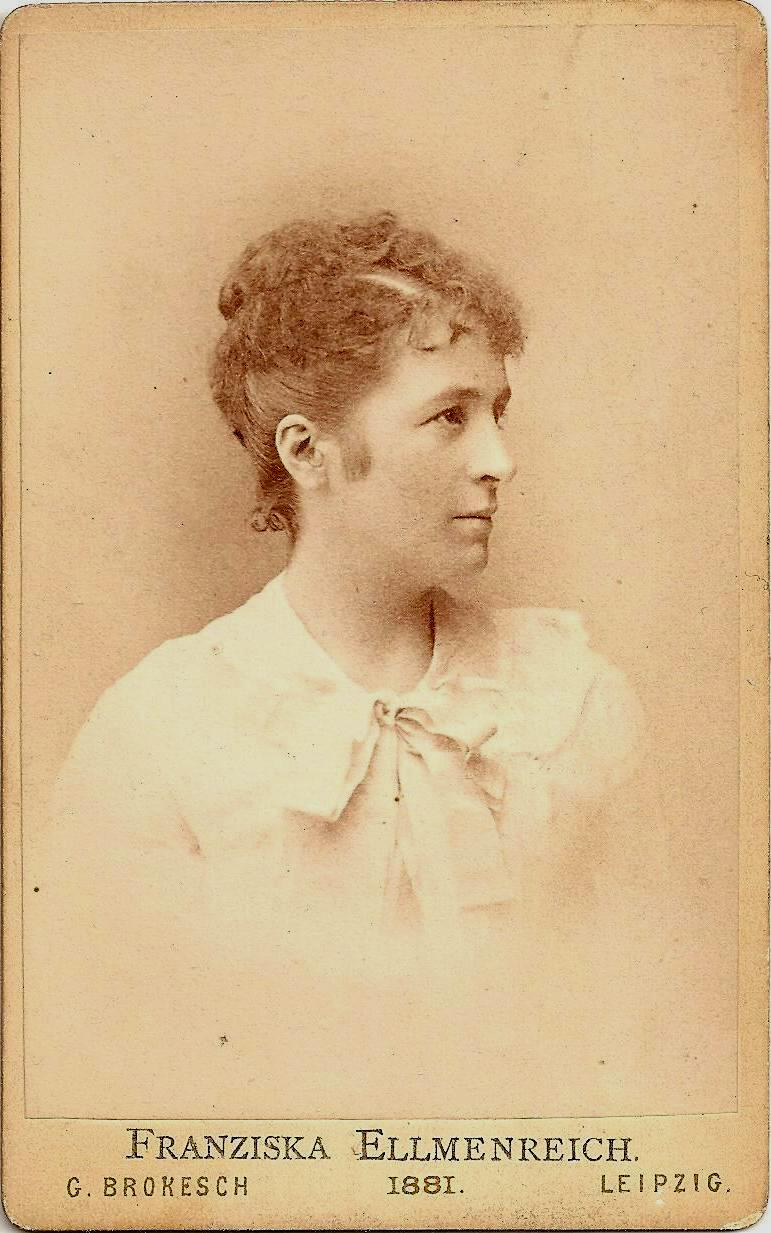
Franziska Ellmenreich in 1881

Ellmenreich made her debut in 1862 in Meiningen. After performances in Mainz and Kassel 1865–75, she became active on stage in Hanover. In 1869 she was a guest at the Burgtheater in Vienna. This was followed by other engagements in Leipzig, Hamburg, Dresden and Munich. In the early 1880s she toured the Americas and in 1883 made guest performances in London, England. After stopover at the Berlin court theater, from 1887 to 1892 she performed in Hamburg's city theater. From 1899 to 1901, she joined the court theater in Berlin.

Then in 1901, Ellmenreich was co-founder of the Deutsches Schauspielhaus in Hamburg. She performed at this theatre from 1901 to 1912. Subsequently, she was appointed as honorary member. Ellmenreich retired from acting in a farewell show at the Berlin court theatre in 1915. She died in 1931.

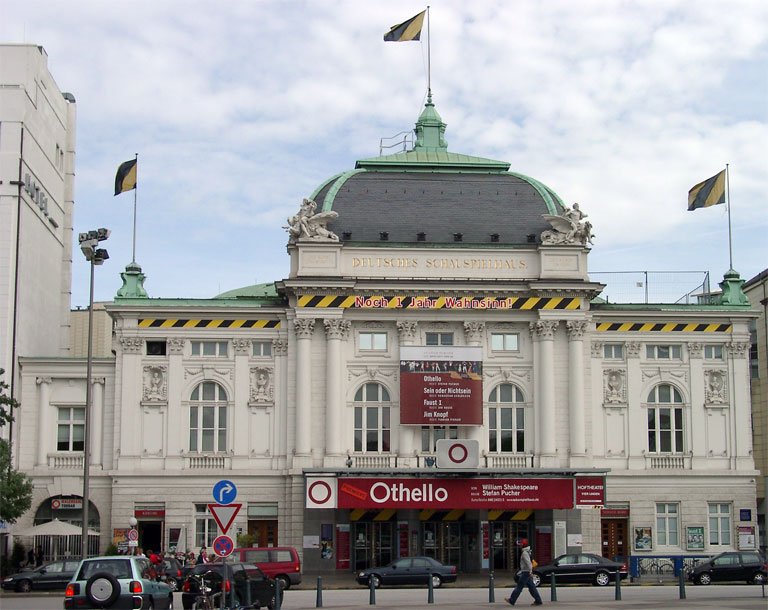
Deutsches Schauspielhaus

In 1948, a street in Hamburg was named after her. The street lies in the district of Mitte, in the suburbs of the city.
