= Martin Brauer =

German actor (1971–2021)

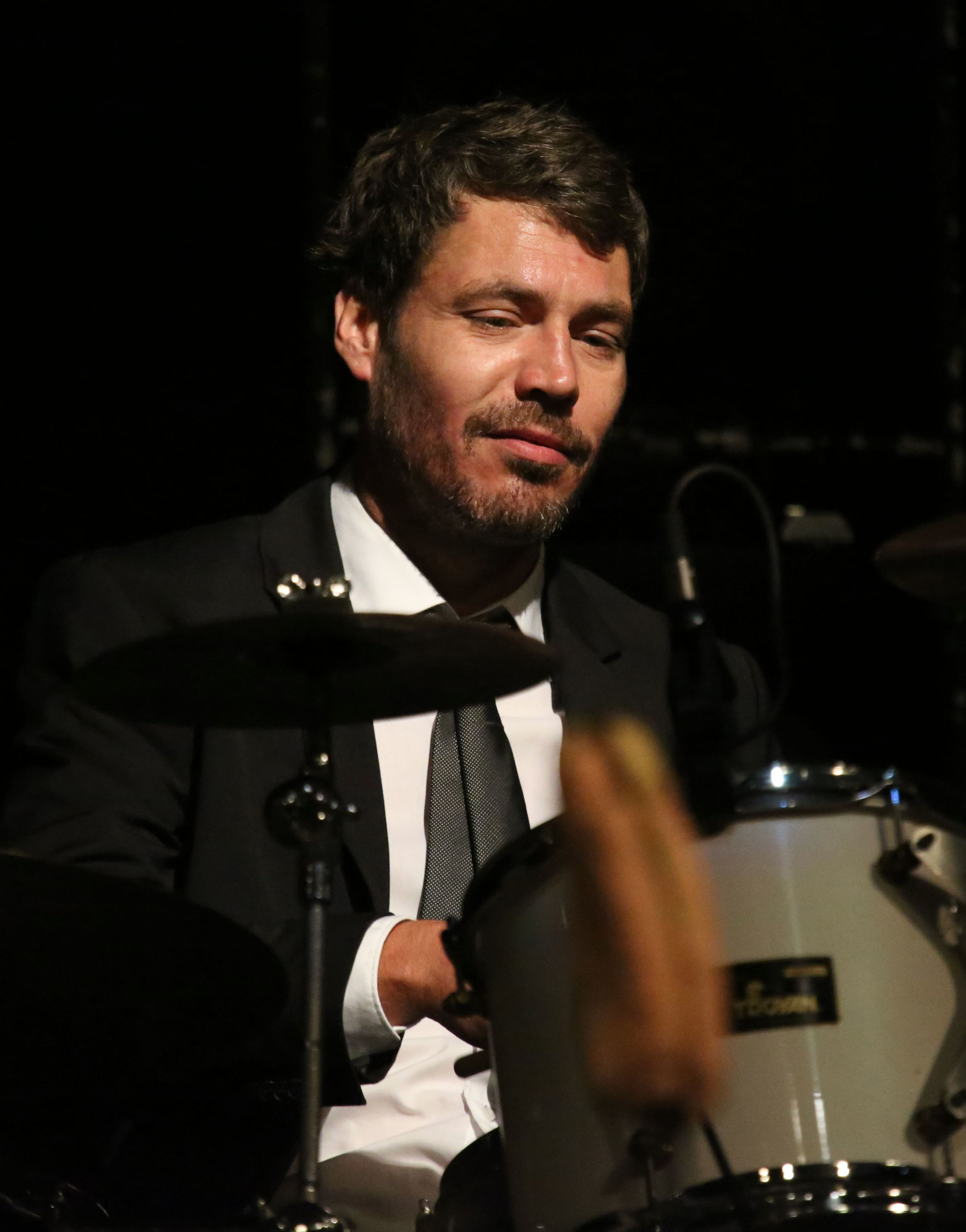
- Brauer in 2014
- Born: 24 March 1971; Rostock, East Germany
- Died: 26 February 2021 (aged 49)
- Occupation(s): Actor, musician

Martin Brauer (24 March 1971 – 26 February 2021) was a German actor and musician.

== Biography ==
Brauer studied percussion at the Hochschule für Musik "Hanns Eisler" from 1987 to 1991 and then acting at the Ernst Busch Academy of Dramatic Arts from 1995 to 1999. He was a troupe member at the Staatsschauspiel Dresden from 1999 to 2001, the Deutsches Theater from 2001 to 2006, the Theater Magdeburg from 2006 to 2008, and the Schauspiel Leipzig from 2008 to 2011. He also acted with the Kulturinsel Halle and the Thalia Theater. He returned to the stage in 2016 as a member of the Mecklenburg State Theatre. In 2019, he played Cyrano de Bergerac in the Schlossfestspiele Schwerin.

In 2018, Brauer won the Conrad-Ekhof-Preis for his outstanding performance as a troupe member at the Mecklenburg State Theater.

From 1999 to 2001, Brauer was a lecturer at the University of Music and Theatre Leipzig. In 2013, he became a lecturer at the Academy of Performing Arts Baden-Wuerttemberg.

In addition to his theatre career, Brauer has appeared in numerous films and television series. He made appearances in episodes of SOKO Wismar, Heldt, and In aller Freundschaft. He also has played drums for multiple bands, including Kapelle der Versöhnung.

On 27 February 2021, the Mecklenburg State Theater announced that Martin Brauer had died unexpectedly the previous night at the age of 49.

== Filmography ==
- Fleisch ist mein Gemüse (2008)
- Die Geschichte Mitteldeutschlands (2010)
