= Forum Queeres Archiv München =

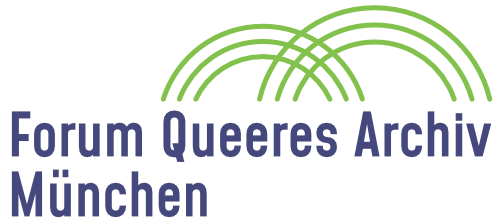
- Established: 1999 (27 years ago)
- Types: Queer community archives
- Legal status: Registered association
- Headquarters: Munich
- Country: Germany
- Coordinates: 48°08′18″N 11°33′11″E
- Membership: 80 (2024)

The Forum Queeres Archiv München (English: Forum Queer Archive Munich - LGBTIQ* in History and Culture) in Munich, Germany, is an association and archive with collections focusing on LGBTQ+ history and culture in Munich, Bavaria and Germany. It opened in 1999 and was named forum homosexualität münchen – Lesben und Schwule in Geschichte und Kultur e.V. till 2019.

== Archive ==
The archive collects documents of lesbian, gay, bisexual, transgender and intersex people: private documents, diaries, photo albums and self-created collections of newspaper articles etc., who "have extraordinary significance to cultural history and are not only worthy but important to preserve." The archive in Munich thus followed similar organizations in Berlin and Cologne. The aim of the archive is "to conserve the past of the LGBTIQ* community in and around Munich and to make it accessible to the public". Currently their library consists of about 3600 volumes, which includes research literature on sociology, history, AIDS and queer studies as well as biographies, coming-out literature, novels, poetry etc. They also possess rare, out-of-print literature of the early women’s/lesbian and gay movement and numerous publications from the time of Magnus Hirschfeld. Approximately 220 magazines with more than 10,000 copies from the 1920s until today, 1,100 video cassettes, DVDs and CDs and 850 posters complete their collection.

Research produced with the help of the Forum's holdings focuses, for example, on the experiences of homosexuals after the Holocaust. In October 2019 members of the Forum formed a research group to investigate the life and work of German painter Paul Hoecker and digitalized a part of the family owned estate of him, which is now located at the Forum.

== Cooperations ==
The Forum Queeres Archiv München cooperated with the Munich Stadtmuseum and the Stadtarchiv Munich. Since 2019 they jointly launched an appeal to collect objects and documents relating to Munich City’s LGBTI+ history, past and present.

== Publications ==
The results of researching the queer past of Munich and beyond are published by the Forum in two different series of publications: In the series Splitter they examine historical and socio-historical topics and present biographies of historical personalities. In the biographical series Lebensgeschichte (English: Personal histories) they publish autobiographical texts and contemporary witness interviews with LGBTIQ* people. In addition, they also publish artist's books featuring materials from their archive.

=== English-language publications ===
- Splitter 14: Philipp Gufler (ed.): I WANNA GIVE YOU DEVOTION [The poster collection of the Forum Queeres Archiv München]. Munich, 2015 (co-published by Hammann von Mier, Munich), ISBN 978-3-947250-06-6
- Splitter 17: Philipp Gufler (ed.): Projection on the Crisis. Gauweilereien in Munich. Munich, 2021 (co-published by Hammann Von Mier, Munich), ISBN 978-3-935227-24-7
- Splitter 19: Stefan Gruhne, Philipp Gufler, Nicholas Maniu, Christina Spachtholz (ed.), Traces of Paul, Berlin / Munich, 2026 (co-published by BQ, Berlin), ISBN 978-3-935227-28-5
- Philipp Gufler: Quilt #01 – #30, Hammann von Mier, Munich München 2020, ISBN 978-3-947250-27-1

== Events ==
The Forum Queeres Archiv München organises city tours, readings, lectures, Erzählcafés (public talks with older queer people), historical exhibitions provide information on LGBTIQ* topics and personalities and art exhibitions. Recently they organized lectures about the attack on Magnus Hirschfeld in 1920 in Munich in collaboration with the Munich Documentation Centre for the History of National Socialism, and about the work and life of Munich-based artist Lorenza Böttner in collaboration with the artist-run space Lothringer13_Florida. As part of its research on Paul Hoecker, in 2026 the BQ Gallery in Berlin presented the solo exhibition Imitationen von Paul by Philipp Gufler.
