= Wilhelmine Suhrlandt =

German lithographer (1803–1863)

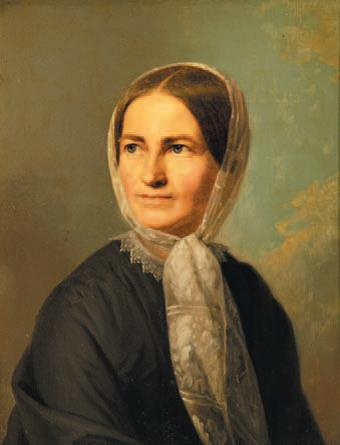
Wilhelmine Suhrlandt; portrait by Rudolph Suhrlandt (1828)

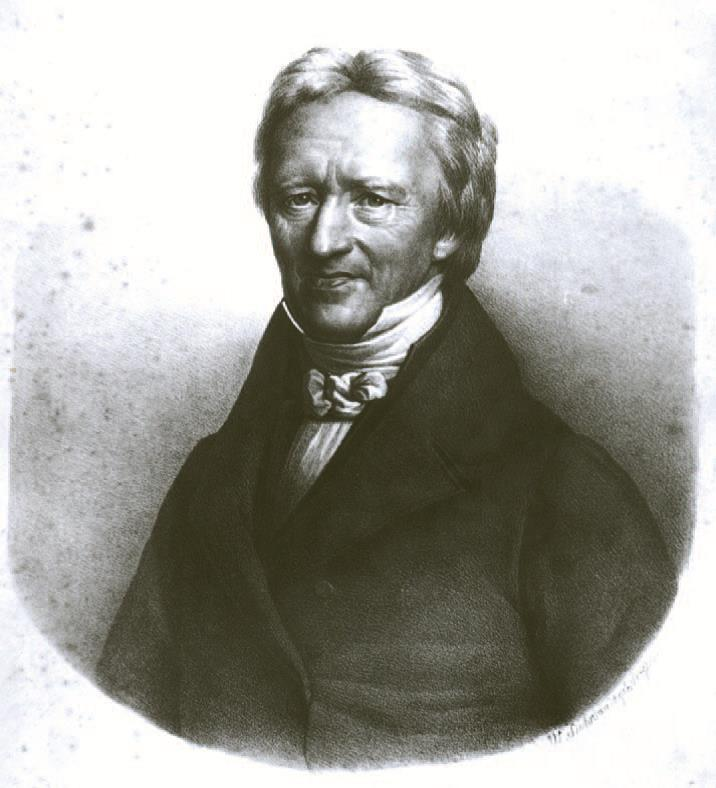
Portrait of Johann Smidt (1830)

Wilhelmine Suhrlandt, née Skoglund (28 June 1803, Ludwigslust - 16 December 1863, Schwerin) was a German lithographer.

== Life and work ==
She was born to a family from Sweden; employed at the Court of Mecklenburg-Schwerin, in Ludwigslust. Her father, Erik Skoglund, was the "Bed Master" at Ludwigslust Castle, and was married to the twin sister of the court painter, Johann Heinrich Suhrlandt.

From 1821, she was a student of Johann Heinrich's son, Rudolph, and married him in 1824. Their children included the painter, Carl Suhrlandt, and the violinist, Pauline Soltau. who also painted. Their other daughter, Franziska, drowned in a boating accident, on Lake Michigan, after emigrating to the United States.

She later learned lithography, most likely from Friedrich Carl Gröger and his associate, Heinrich Jacob Aldenrath, then created portraits of several notable people. Her portrait of Johann Smidt, the Mayor of Bremen, was popular and widely reproduced.
