= Boltenhagen =

- Municipality
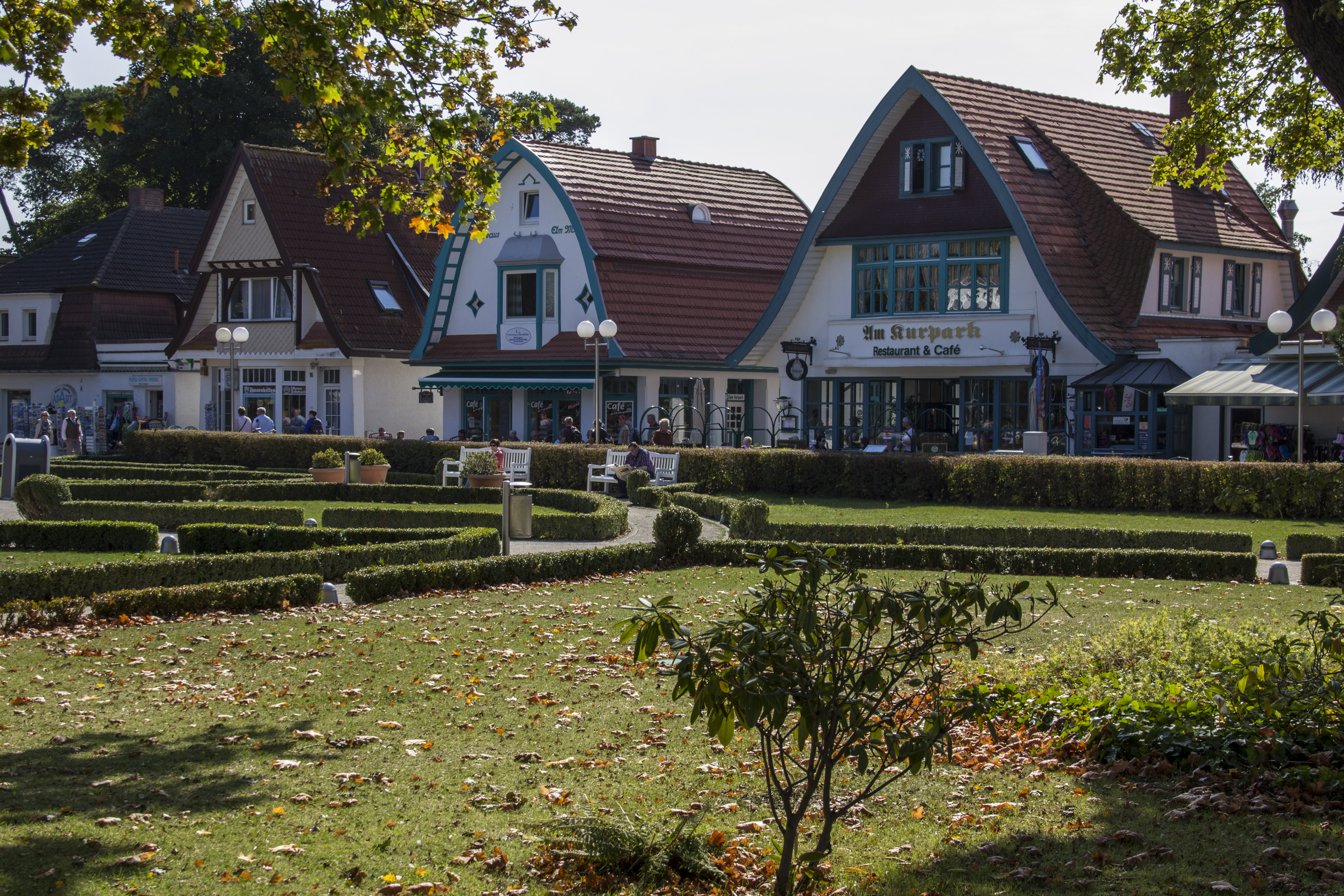
- Boltenhagen Centre

- Coat of arms

- Location of Boltenhagen within Nordwestmecklenburg district
- Interactive map of Boltenhagen
- Location within Germany Location within Mecklenburg-Vorpommern
- Coordinates: 53°58′N 11°13′E
- Country: Germany
- State: Mecklenburg-Vorpommern
- District: Nordwestmecklenburg
- Municipal assoc.: Klützer Winkel

Government
  - Mayor: Christian Schmiedeberg (CDU)

Area
  - Total: 18.09 km^{2} (6.98 sq mi)
- Elevation: 4 m (13 ft)

Population (2025-12-31)
  - Total: 2,445
  - Density: 135.2/km^{2} (350.1/sq mi)
- Time zone: UTC+01:00 (CET)
  - Summer (DST): UTC+02:00 (CEST)
- Postal codes: 23946
- Dialling codes: 038825
- Vehicle registration: NWM
- Website: www.boltenhagen.de

Boltenhagen (German pronunciation: [bɔltn̩ˈhaːɡn̩]) is a German seaside resort in Mecklenburg-Vorpommern situated on the Baltic Sea coast 30 km east of Lübeck. It has a wide view of the Bay of Lübeck; a 5 km stretch of a wide and sandy beach, a boardwalk, restaurants and health spas. Boltenhagen is considered to be part of the German Riviera.

It is close to the cities of Lübeck, Wismar and Schwerin and is part of the Hamburg Metropolitan Region. Because of its location it is one of the most famous German seaside resorts at the Baltic Sea.

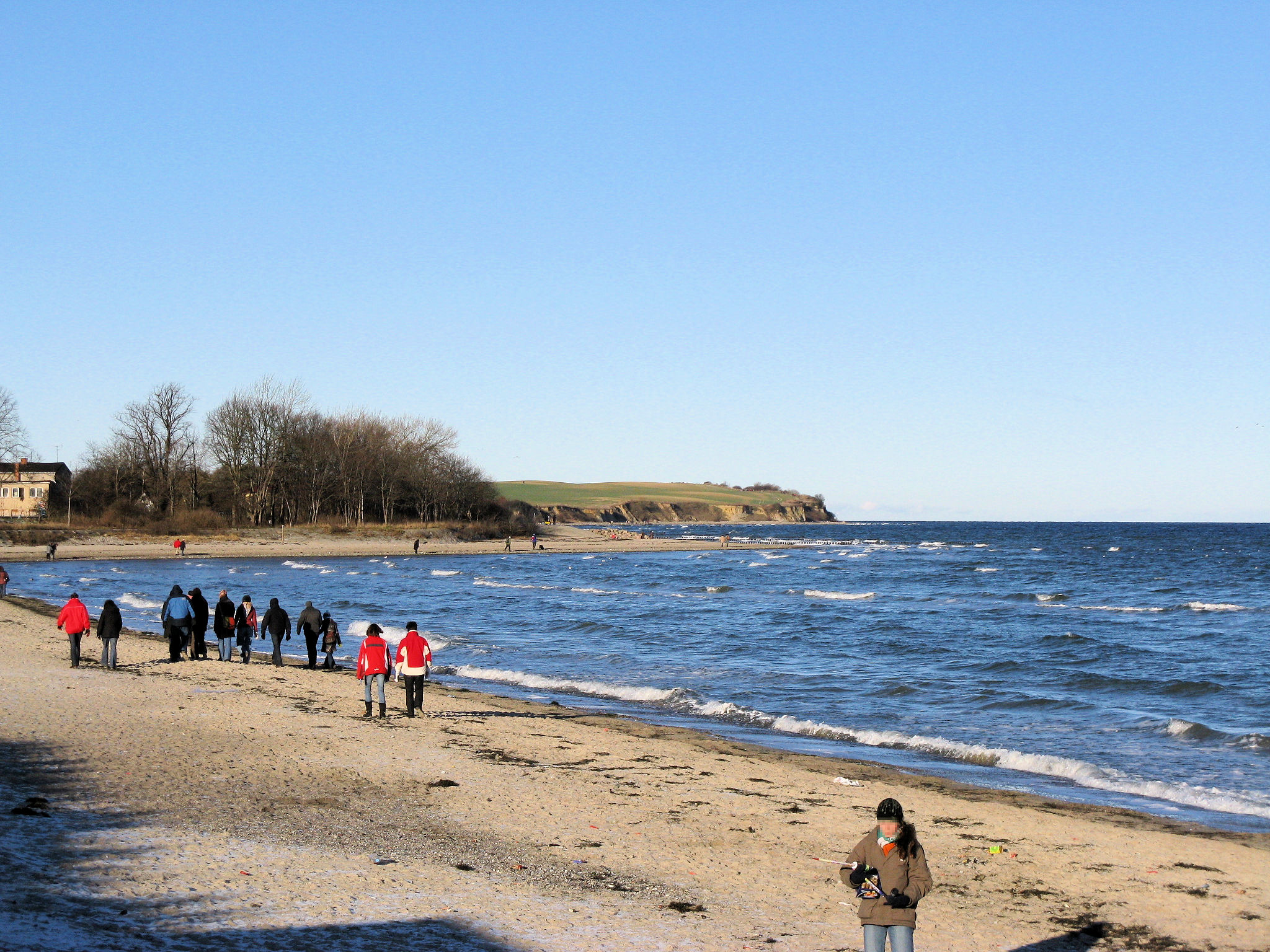
Baltic sea beach and cliff coast (in the background)

Boltenhagen is especially popular with families for its shallow beaches and has a total of 24 beach sections. At each beach section tourists are able to rent a Strandkorb.

A marina with fishing harbour connects to the resort at its easternmost end, offering hotels and private beaches overlooking the vast Wohlenberger Wiek, a shallow bay in between Boltenhagen and Wismar.

West of the town and close to the seaside lies the picturesque little castle of Gross-Schwansee, recently refurbished and converted into a luxury hotel. South of it, Bothmer Mansion, a remarkable Tudor-style manor house in the nearby village of Klütz can be visited.

Even historically Boltenhagen has been a popular holiday resort in Eastern Germany as being the second town, where bathing wagons have been placed. Today the town offers nearly 10.000 beds.

The art historian Wilhelm Titel was born in Boltenhagen.

== Climate ==
Climate data for Boltenhagen (1991–2020 normals)
Month	Jan	Feb	Mar	Apr	May	Jun	Jul	Aug	Sep	Oct	Nov	Dec	Year
Mean daily maximum °C (°F)	3.7 (38.7)	4.4 (39.9)	7.4 (45.3)	11.6 (52.9)	15.6 (60.1)	19.3 (66.7)	21.8 (71.2)	22.0 (71.6)	18.1 (64.6)	13.1 (55.6)	7.9 (46.2)	4.7 (40.5)	12.5 (54.5)
Daily mean °C (°F)	1.7 (35.1)	2.1 (35.8)	4.3 (39.7)	7.9 (46.2)	11.9 (53.4)	15.3 (59.5)	17.7 (63.9)	17.8 (64.0)	14.5 (58.1)	10.1 (50.2)	5.7 (42.3)	2.8 (37.0)	9.3 (48.7)
Mean daily minimum °C (°F)	−0.5 (31.1)	−0.3 (31.5)	1.4 (34.5)	4.5 (40.1)	8.1 (46.6)	11.2 (52.2)	13.7 (56.7)	13.9 (57.0)	11.1 (52.0)	7.3 (45.1)	3.3 (37.9)	0.7 (33.3)	6.2 (43.2)
Average precipitation mm (inches)	45.4 (1.79)	39.9 (1.57)	36.4 (1.43)	30.7 (1.21)	49.8 (1.96)	66.5 (2.62)	61.8 (2.43)	68.4 (2.69)	51.2 (2.02)	49.5 (1.95)	45.1 (1.78)	51.0 (2.01)	597.3 (23.52)
Average precipitation days (≥ 0.1 mm)	17.3	14.9	13.9	11.8	13.1	13.5	14.3	14.6	13.3	14.7	15.7	16.6	173.1
Average snowy days (≥ 1.0 cm)	5.0	5.8	2.1	0.2	0	0	0	0	0	0	0.5	2.8	14.6
Average relative humidity (%)	86.8	84.3	81.8	79.4	79.6	78.8	78.5	77.7	80.4	83.9	87.7	88.1	82.3
Mean monthly sunshine hours	48.1	68.4	131.8	201.4	249.2	240.4	242.0	216.9	163.3	117.4	54.8	37.9	1,771.6
Source: NOAA
