= Gun-Brit Barkmin =

German opera singer

- Born: 1971 (age 54–55); Rostock, then in East Germany
- Occupation: Soprano singer
- Website: www.barkmin.com/en/

Gun-Brit Barkmin is a German opera singer and concert soloist in the vocal range soprano who has garnered generally positive reviews for her performances in leading roles in operas by Janáček, Britten, Berg, Wagner and Richard Strauss, although (writing in The New Yorker) Alex Ross felt that she "showed strain" in her role as Salome. In contrast, Anthony Tommasini of the New York Times found she sang the role with "searing power and unflagging intensity." James Leonard comments that her collaboration with Zürcher Klaviertrio to record Seven Romances on Poems by Alexander Blok by Shostakovich added "human tenderness."

She was born in Rostock in 1971 (in the former German Democratic Republic) but now lives in Berlin. She has performed in the US, Canada, UK, Japan, Germany, Spain, France, Italy, Austria, Switzerland, Czech Republic, Brazil, Australia and New Zealand.

Her given name is of Swedish origin.

== Awards ==
- 2002: Daphne prize of the Theatergemeinde Berlin (Berlin theater community)
