= Johann Leopold Abel =

German pianist and composer

- Born: 24 July 1795; Ludwigslust, Holy Roman Empire
- Died: 1871 (aged 75–76); London, England
- Occupations: Pianist, composer

Johann Leopold Abel (24 July 1795 – 1871) was a German pianist and composer.

== Biography ==
Abel was the grandson of Leopold August Abel and the son of Christian Andreas Abel, miniature painter to the Grand Duke of Mecklenburg-Schwerin.

Born in Ludwigslust, he attempted to tour as a child prodigy on the piano, but this was a failure. He taught music in German courts until 1819 when health problems prompted him to travel abroad. He traveled to Savannah, Georgia in order to visit his brother and then sailed to London in 1820, where he stayed until his death in 1871.

He was the father of the British chemist Sir Frederick Abel.
