= Royal School of Art in Berlin =

Former art school in Berlin, Germany

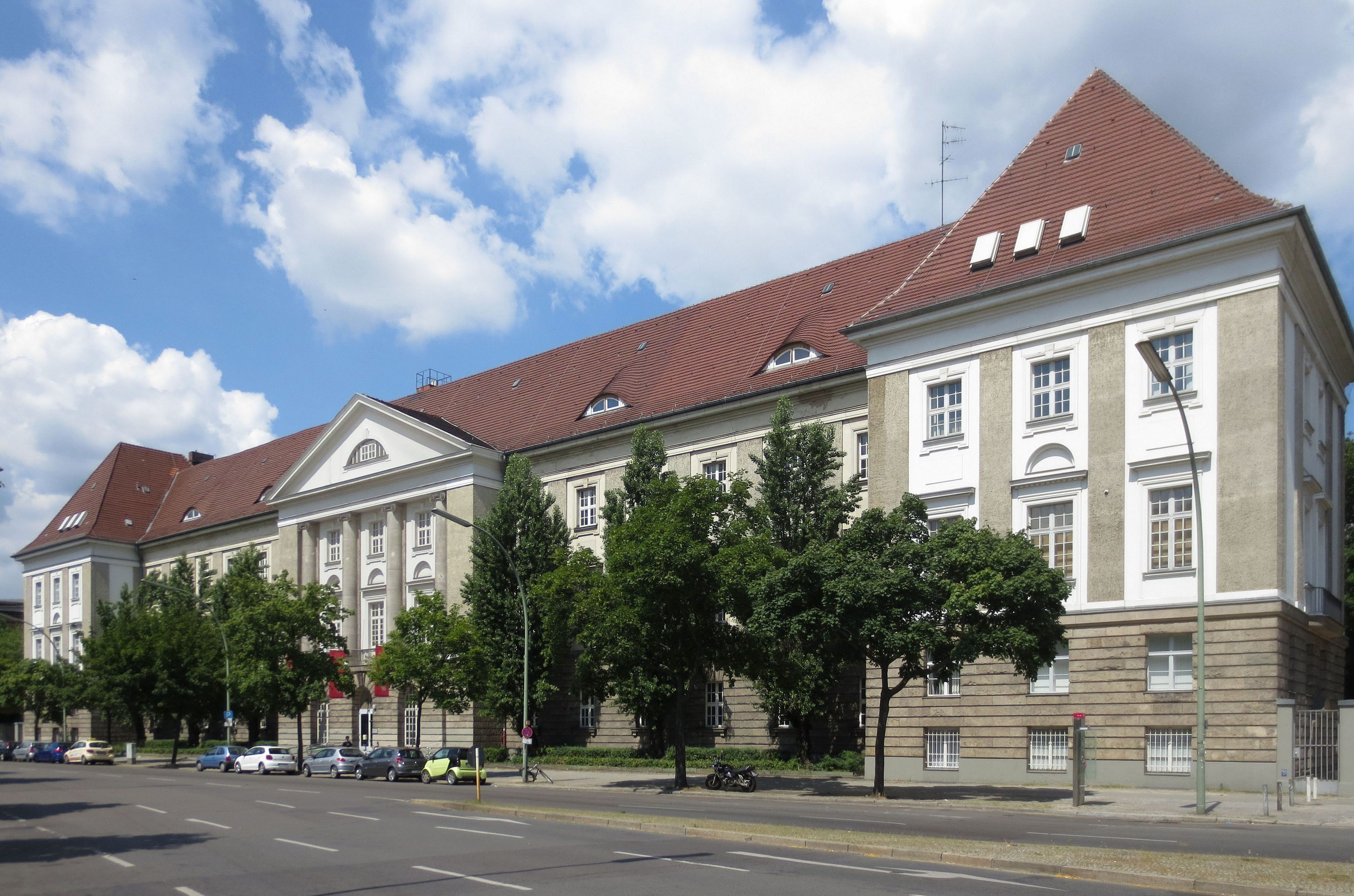
the school's 1920 building, Grunewaldstrasse, Schoeneberg, Berlin

The Royal School of Art in Berlin (Königliche Kunstschule zu Berlin) was a state-sponsored art school founded in 1869. The school was founded through its association with the Prussian Academy of Arts, and after unification stood as one of Berlin's art schools for over 70 years.

The school went through a number of changes in name and emphasis before its closure in the 1945/46 academic season. Its programs and assets were eventually integrated into the present-day Berlin University of the Arts.

== History ==
Architect Martin Gropius was the school's organizer and first director. The program developed from two existing schools within the Academy, an "arts and trade union school" and a drawing school. Gropius also designed their new building at Klosterstraße 75 (demolished in 1931).

After German unification, the art school in 1872 expanded into teacher education. In 1874 women were first admitted. On the death of Gropius in 1880, painter Ernst Ewald assumed the directorship. (Ewald was simultaneously the director of the small teaching institute at the State Museum of Decorative Arts.)

Impressionist painter Philipp Franck became director in 1915, after the beginning of World War I.

When painter Elise Blumann completed a two-year course at the school between 1917 and 1919, as a woman she could choose from the School of Applied Arts, the Berlin School for Women Arts founded in 1868, and the Royal School of Art. The Academy did not accept female fine arts students until October 1919. Blumann graduated with an art teacher's diploma.

Following the 1918 abdication of the Kaiser and the German Revolution of 1918–19, the establishment was renamed the State Art School of Berlin (Staatliche Kunstschule zu Berlin), and moved into new purpose-built facilities at Grunewaldstraße 2–5, Schöneberg.

Painter Alexander Kanoldt assumed the directorship in 1933, as the Nazis came to power. His work would eventually be seized and destroyed as degenerate art. Kanoldt resigned in 1936, and the school was renamed the State College of Arts (Staatliche Hochschule für Kunsterziehung). Hans Zimbal was among its final directors in the war years before its closure in 1945.
