= Rudolph Suhrlandt =

German lithographer & painter (1781–1862)

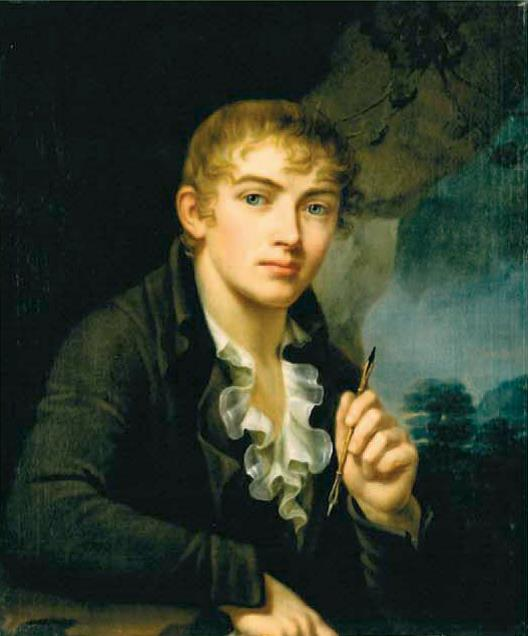
Self-portrait (1810)

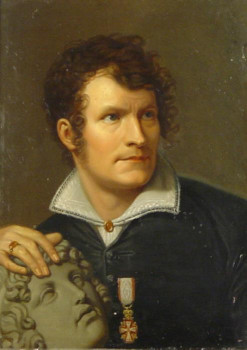
Portrait of Bertel Thorvaldsen (c.1810)

Rudolph Friedrich Carl Suhrlandt (19 December 1781, in Ludwigslust – 2 February 1862, in Schwerin) was a German portrait painter and lithographer.

== Biography ==
His father, Johann Heinrich Suhrlandt, was a court painter for Grand Duke Fredrick Francis I of Mecklenburg. His first art lessons came from his father. In 1799, he became a student at the Dresden Academy of Fine Arts, with a royal scholarship and a recommendation from Christian Daniel Rauch. His teachers there included Johann Eleazar Zeissig and Josef Grassi.

In 1803, he moved to Vienna to take classes at the Academy of Fine Arts with Heinrich Füger. There, he acquainted himself with the writings of Johann Joachim Winckelmann on Classical art and came under the influence of Antonio Canova. He also established his reputation by producing portraits of Polish and Russian aristocrats. In 1808, he went to Rome, where he joined the Guild of Saint Luke and associated with the "Deutschrömer" (Germans residing in Rome). Over one-hundred of his drawings from this period are in the Kupferstichkabinett Berlin.

By 1816, he was back in Mecklenburg, where he joined his father as a court painter. The following year, he was awarded the title of Professor. His contract allowed him to travel for several months every two years, which he took advantage of to visit Stockholm, Saint Petersburg and London. From 1822 to 1844, he sporadically lived in Bremen, but Mecklenburg remained his home, having built a house there in 1818. He married the lithographer, Wilhelmine Skoglund, in 1824. After 1849, they lived in Schwerin. His son, Carl Suhrlandt, also became a painter. His daughter, Pauline Soltau, was a concert violinist as well as a painter.

== Writings ==
- Aphorismen über die bildenden Künste, durch Beispiele erläutert. (Aphorisms in the Visual Arts Explained, with Examples), Sandmeyer (1857) 94 pgs.
