= Carl Suhrlandt =

German painter (1828–1919)

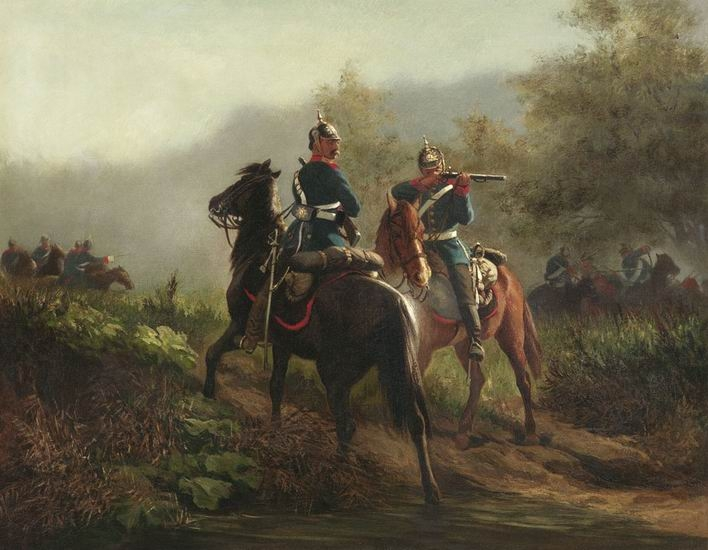
Prussian Soldiers in a Skirmish

Carl Suhrlandt (10 July 1828, Ludwigslust – 11 February 1919, Kochel am See) was a German painter. All of his works feature animals; mostly horses. Also known as Karl Friedrich August Suhrlandt.

== Life and work ==
He came from a family of artists. His father, Rudolph Suhrlandt, was a court painter and his mother, Wilhelmine, was a lithographer. His sister, Pauline Soltau, was a concert violinist who also painted.

He received his first drawing lessons from his father, then studied sculpting with Christian Daniel Rauch in Berlin. In 1851, he went to Paris to study painting with Ary Scheffer. He worked in Copenhagen from 1859 to 1860, then visited St. Petersburg in 1861, where he became a member of the Imperial Academy of Fine Arts.

He then went to live in Schwerin where, in 1874, he was appointed a Professor by Frederick Francis II, Grand Duke of Mecklenburg-Schwerin. In 1898, he moved to Munich. Although he initially painted portraits and historical scenes, he eventually became a sought-after horse painter and made several visits to England in that capacity.

== Sources ==
- "Suhrlandt, Carl". In: Hans Vollmer (Ed.): Allgemeines Lexikon der Bildenden Künstler von der Antike bis zur Gegenwart, Vol.32: Stephens–Theodotos. E. A. Seemann, Leipzig 1938, pg.280.
- Hela Baudis: Rudolph Suhrlandt (1781–1862). Grenzgänger zwischen Klassizismus und Biedermeier. Leben und Werk eines deutschen Hofmalers und Porträtisten des Bürgertums Dissertation, Greifswald 2008, pp. 179–185 (Online).
- Grewolls, Grete (2011). Wer war wer in Mecklenburg und Vorpommern. Das Personenlexikon (in German). Rostock: Hinstorff Verlag. p. 9943. ISBN 978-3-356-01301-6.
