= Rudolf Tarnow =

German writer

A portrait of Rudolf Tarnow

Rudolf Tarnow (25 February 1867 in Parchim, Grand Duchy of Mecklenburg-Schwerin - 19 May 1933 in Schwerin) was a Low German writer.

== Early life ==
Rudolf Tarnow was born on 25 February 1867 in the city of Parchim, the oldest son of a shoemaker, Heinrich Tarnow, and his wife, Dorothea (née Pingel). He attended school from 1873 until 1881, claiming to be a very good student, although he often focused more on social life than schoolwork, which he saved for home.

After success in school, he began a commercial apprenticeship in a textile factory in his home town, which he completed successfully in 1885. In 1896, he married Erna Bruns. From this relationship came three children, two sons, Walter and Rudolf, and a daughter, Elisabeth. After his service in the military, where he spent some years in the personal military company of the grand duke of Mecklenburg, he applied successfully to be the superintendent of the insane asylum in Schwerin.

== Writing career ==
He began to publish his work, which was written in Low German, around 1910, to celebrate the 100th anniversary of the birth of fellow Low German author Fritz Reuter. On 7 October 1910 his poem "Ein Randewuh im Rathaus zu Stavenhagen" (English: A Rendezvous at the City Hall of Stavenhagen), was published as a special edition. After that, he published many poems, and also regularly published essays. His essays were taken from real-life experiences, focusing on, and making fun of, the weaknesses of his fellow man.

One of his best known works is "Köster Klickermann," where he combines his childhood memories of both school and church. Some of his work was lighter in tone, however. His love of children lead him to write the children's books and collections of children's poems as well. Tarnow died on 19 May 1933 in Schwerin, after a heart-related illness. Even today, many streets and schools in Mecklenburg-Vorpommern are named after Tarnow. A complete folio of Tarnow's works was found in storage in the city of Rostock in 1987.
