= Pauline Soltau =

German painter, violinist (1833–1902)

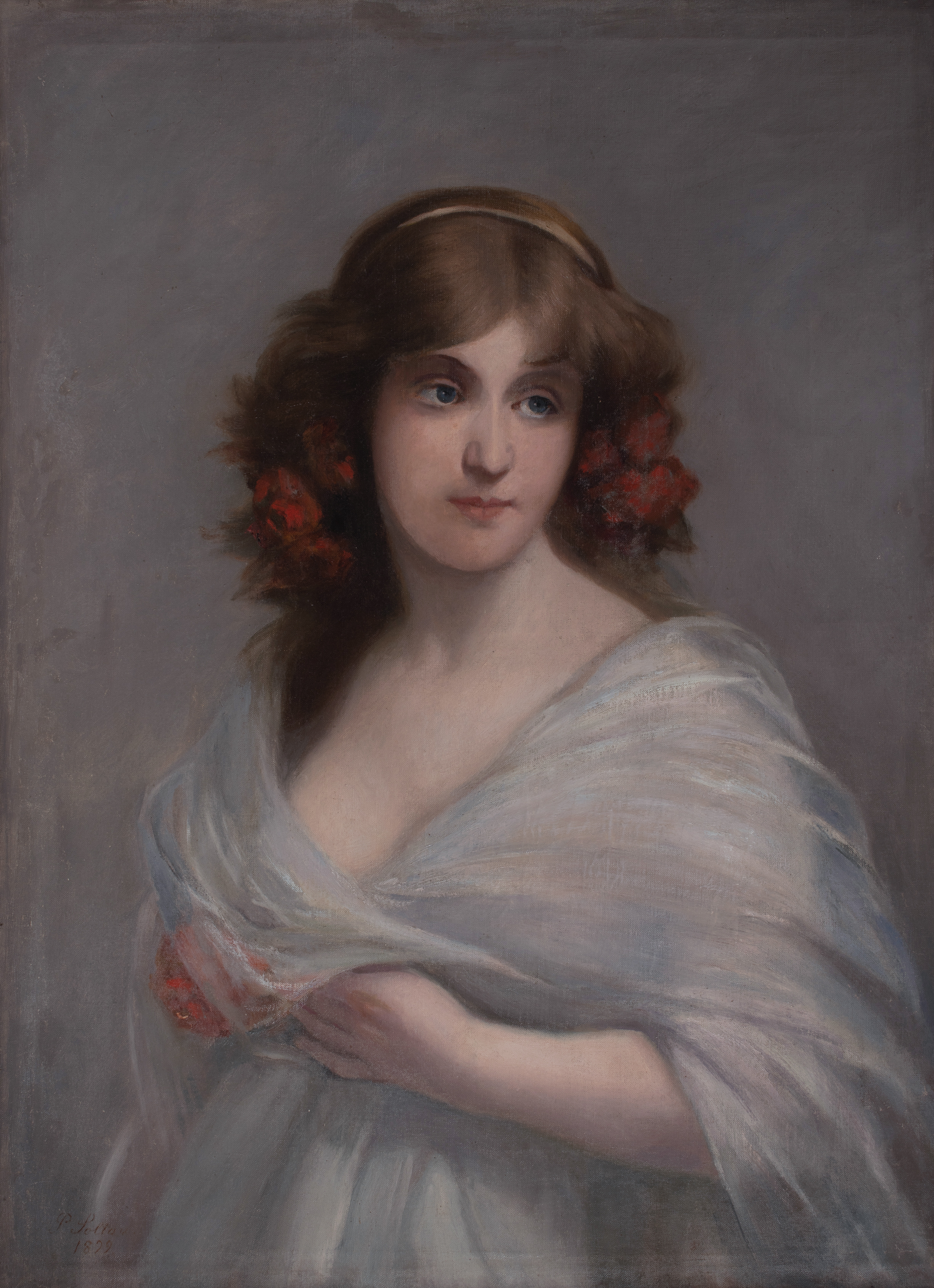
- Born: Pauline Suhrlandt; 30 June 1833; Ludwigslust, Germany
- Died: 13 April 1902; Schwerin, Germany
- Occupation(s): Painter, violinist
- Spouse: Friedrich Soltau (m. 1858– 1893; his death)
- Parents: Rudolph Suhrlandt (father); Wilhelmine Suhrlandt (mother)
- Relatives: Carl Suhrlandt (brother)

Signature
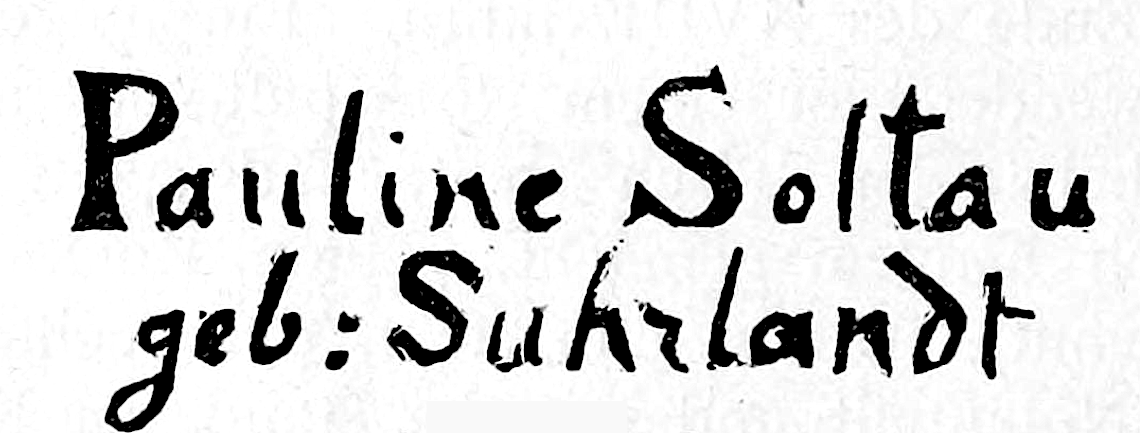

Pauline Soltau (30 June 1833 – 13 April 1902; née Pauline Suhrlandt) was a German painter and violinist. She was known for her portrait paintings and genre scene paintings.

== Life and career ==
Pauline Soltau was born as Pauline Suhrlandt on 30 June 1833, in Ludwigslust, Germany. She was the daughter of the court painter Rudolph Suhrlandt, and his wife, the lithographer Wilhelmine Skoglund. Her younger brother was painter Carl Suhrlandt. She was married in 1858, as the second wife to politician Friedrich Soltau.

Soltau started since early childhood painting and playing the violin. She also studied fine art with her father Rudolf Suhrlandt, and with painter Édouard Dubufe in Paris.

Subjects of her portraits included Alfred von Wolzogen, Georg Adolf Demmler, Emilie Mayer, and Frederick Francis II.

She died on 13 April 1902, in Schwerin, Germany.
