= Friederike Ellmenreich =

Friederike Ellmenreich (1775 in Köthen - 5 April 1845 in Schwerin) was a German actress, contralto opera singer, and writer.

== Life ==
Ellmenreich was the daughter of singer Christian Brandl and actress Marianne Rouillon. In 1792 she married bass buffo singer Johann Baptist Ellmenreich in Hanau. A year later, the family moved to Frankfurt am Main.

In 1794, Ellmenreich separated from her husband and made her debut in Prague. She was then engaged by impresario Emanuel Schikaneder at his Theatre an der Wien. In 1796, she went on tour through Italy.

In 1801, she returned to her husband in Germany. The following year, Johann Baptist Ellmenreich was engaged in Saint Petersburg. Friederike Ellmenreich used this time to study singing with Luigi Cherubini in Paris. Between 1805 and 1811, she performed as an opera singer in Strasbourg, Augsburg and Vienna.

In 1812, she was again engaged as an actress, and partly as a singer, at the Karlsruhe Court Theatre. This was followed by engagements in Hamburg (1817), Mannheim (1820) and Frankfurt am Main (1821–1837).

At the age of 61, she retired from the stage in 1836 and moved in with her son, Albert Ellmenreich, in Schwerin. Throughout her life, she published numerous translations and adaptations of mostly French and Italian opera texts, which were frequently performed.

Her granddaughter was actress Franziska Ellmenreich (1847–1931).

== Works ==
- Lustspiele (in German). Vol. 1. Translated by Ellmenreich, Friederike. Kupferberg: Mainz. 1827., contains
  - Röschens Aussteuer oder: Das Duell. Comedy in three acts
  - Die beiden Wittwen oder: Der Konstrast. Comedy in one act
  - Der Vampyr. A farce in one act. After the French of Eugène Scribe
  - Der Großpapa. Comedy in one act. Freely adapted from the French
1. Lustspiele (in German). Vol. 2. Translated by Ellmenreich, Friederike. Kupferberg: Mainz. 1827., contains:
  - Michel und Christine. Comedy in one act
  - Der entführte Offizier. Comedy in one act
  - Das beste Loos: Ein Mann. Comedy in one act. Freely adapted from the French.
  - Die Nachtwandlerin. Comedy in two acts. Freely adapted from the French by Scribé
- Ellmenreich, Friederike, ed. (1828). Einheimischer Theater-Kalender für die kunstsinnigen Freunde der hiesigen Volks-Bühne für das Jahr 1828 (in German). Weber.

List of further works in Goedeke's Grundriss zur Geschichte der deutschen Dichtung.
