= Johann Heinrich Suhrlandt =

German painter (1742–1827)

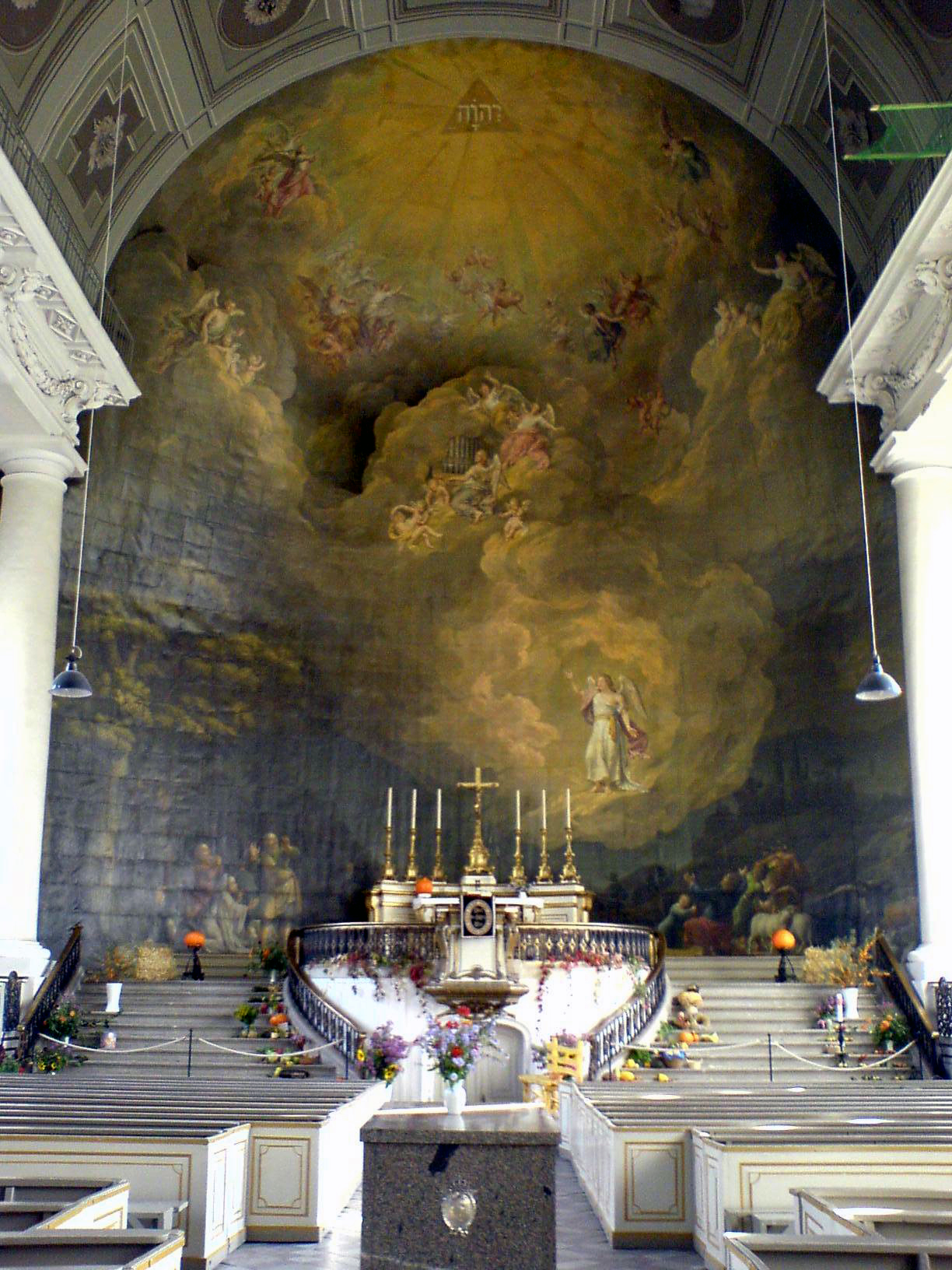
Altarpiece: Stadtkirche, Ludwigslust

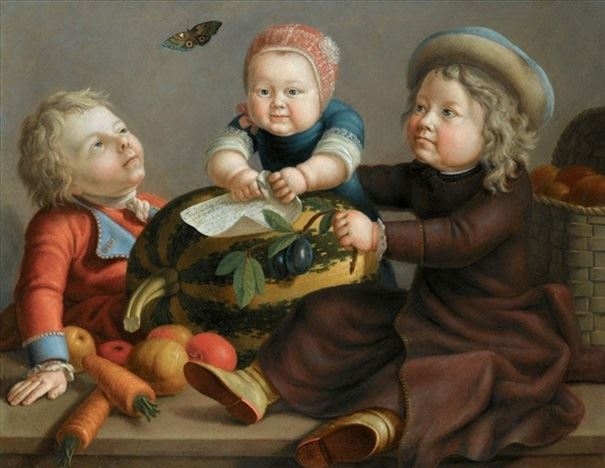
A portrait of the artist's three sons

Johann Heinrich Suhrlandt (30 March 1742, Schwerin - 1 January 1827, Ludwigslust) was a court painter for Duke Frederick II, and Grand Duke Frederick Francis I, of Mecklenburg-Schwerin.

== Life and work ==
His father, Johann Friedrich Suhrlandt, was the court mechanic. His first art lessons were with, Johann Wilhelm Lehmann, a court painter who recognized his talent. He was, however, unable to obtain a formal academic education, as there were no art schools in Mecklenburg and Duke Frederick would not provide a scholarship. Eventually, he turned to sculpture and took lessons from Johann Joachim Busch, the court sculptor. Another court painter, Johann Dietrich Findorff, helped him study painting until his death in 1772. Yet a third court painter, Georg David Matthieu, became his mentor until he also died, in 1778,

In 1777, he married Christina Luisa Schmidt (1753-1793), daughter of the organ builder, Paul Schmidt. They had six children, one of which, Rudolph, would become a well known history and portrait painter. Following her death from "consumption", he married the widow, Elisabeth Marie Kramel (1748-1827), who brought her own child into the marriage.

Suhrlandt mainly painted landscapes, animals, still-lifes and Biblical scenes; creating decorative art for the Marienkirche in Ribnitz, the Stadtkirche in Crivitz, and the Stadtkirche in Stavenhagen. In 1791, he was commissioned to create the interior designs for the "Lusthaus", which was being built for Princess Louise. He completed a number of wall paintings, including a depiction of a military victory, won by Prince Josias of Saxe-Coburg-Saalfeld. After completing the commission, the Princess refused to pay him his promised wages; a recurring situation at the court during that period.

His best-known work was a monumental altarpiece, depicting the Annunciation, at the Stadtkirche in Ludwigslust, which had been left unfinished by his teacher, Findorff, and allowed to remain that way until 1788. He was occupied with that project until 1803, due to his many other duties as court painter, which included the design of decorations for the court festivals, the painting of fabrics and wallpaper and the design of silk flags for the military. In addition, he was responsible for maintaining the ducal art holdings, and therefore often had to restore old pictures.

In 1818, he received his last commission; decorations for the new "Oberappellationsgericht" (Appeals Court) in Parchim. It proved to be a very labor-intensive assignment, so he had to excuse himself due to poor health. He nevertheless remained productive into his last years, devoting his time to still lifes.
