= Albert Ellmenreich =

- Born: 10 February 1816; Karlsruhe, Germany
- Died: 30 May 1905 (aged 89); Lübeck

Albert Ellmenreich was a German actor, writer, dancer, singer and composer. He was born on 10 February 1816 in Karlsruhe, Germany, and died on 30 May 1905 in Lübeck.

== Life ==
Ellmenreich was the son of Johann Ellmenreich and his wife Friederike. He grew up in the cities of Hamburg (1817), Mannheim (1820) and Frankfurt (1821). In Frankfurt, Ellmenreich finished school and joined the Frankfurt Theatre's choir (1833). In 1834, he found work in Altenburg. Appearances in Nürnberg (1834), Düsseldorf (1835) and Schwerin (1836) followed. In Schwerin his mother lived with him until her death in 1845. At the Hoftheater (Court Theatre) of Schwerin, Ellmenreich became a member of the ensemble and remained so until 1860. For one year, until 1861, he led the theater in Rostock. For many years a tour life followed which led him as an actor to Breslau, Meiningen, Mainz, and Berlin. As a director he worked in Rotterdam, Mainz, Frankfurt, Krefeld, Bamberg, Würzburg, Riga, Danzig, Sigmaringen, and Poznań tätig.

In 1883 Ellmenreich celebrated his fiftieth stage anniversary. In 1884 he withdrew from the stage and retired, then moved to Lübeck. Albert Ellmenreich died in Lübeck on 30 May 1905. He was 89 years old.

== Works ==
- Acht Kriegslieder (Eight war songs, 1870)
- Der Auferstandene (1858)
- Gundel oder die Beiden Kaiser (1849)
- Das Rebhuhn oder ich heirate meine Frau (The Partridge or I Marry my Wife, 1853)
- Der Schmied von Gretna-Green (1856)
- Ein unglücklicher Liebhaber (An Unfortunate Lover, 1869)

He also composed a number of smaller pieces, including The Spinning Song (1863 or earlier).
